= Squatting in England and Wales =

Occupation of unused land or derelict buildings in England and Wales

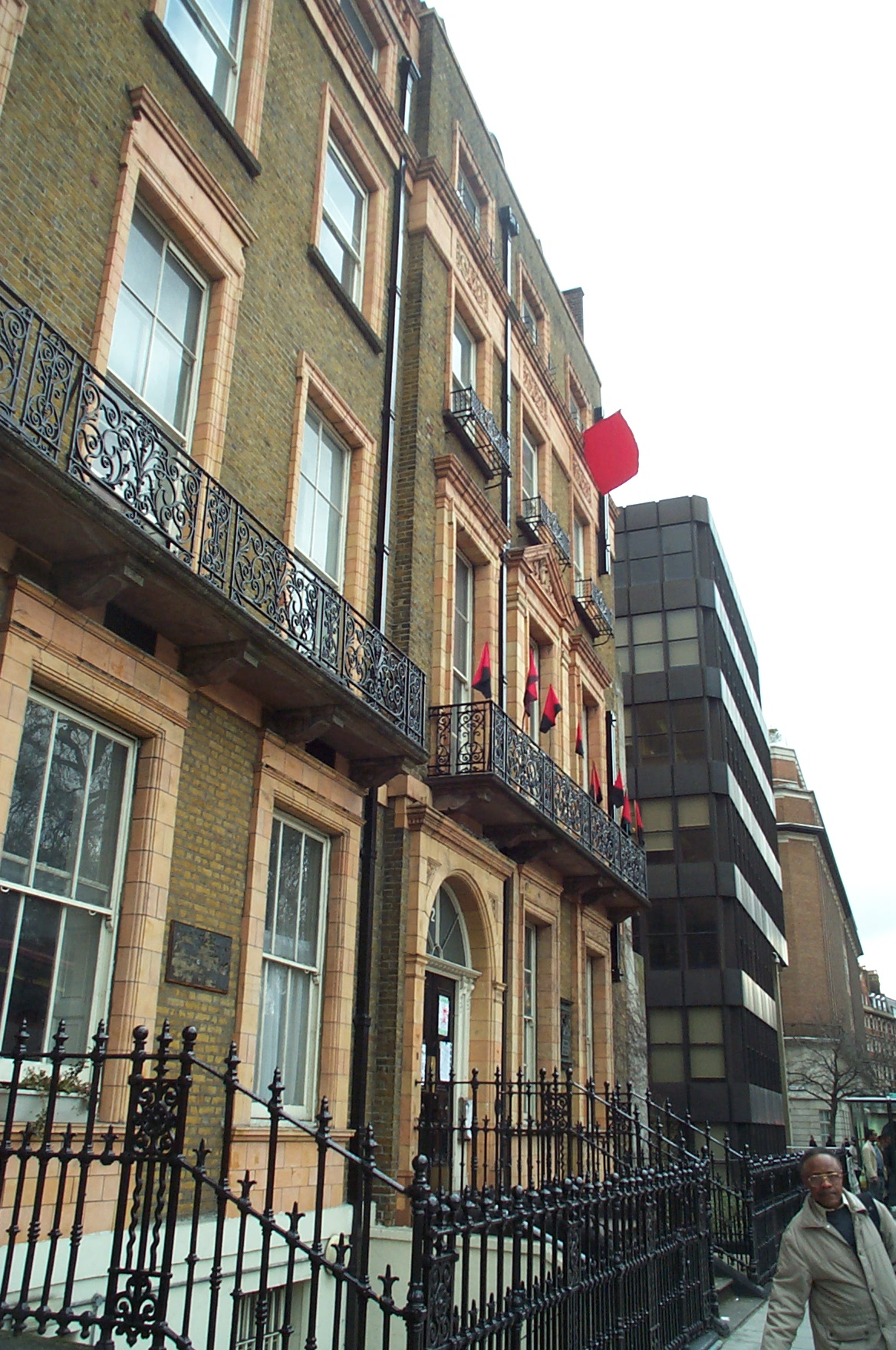
The "London Social Centre" an anarcho-syndicalist squat in Russell Square, 2006.

In England and Wales, (Note: In the two other legal jurisdictions within the United Kingdom, in Scotland (which has had a criminal trespass law since 1885) and in Northern Ireland (where paramilitarism is a factor), the history and development of squatting is significantly distinct.) squatting – the occupation of a vacant property without the owner's consent – has been progressively criminalised since the 1970s. The relative toleration accorded by a common law tradition in which the practice was unlawful but not criminal, was eroded in the wake of a wave of squatting that in the 1970s crested in London. At the end of that decade, there were estimated to be 50,000 squatters in England and Wales, with 30,000 in the capital.

Squatters typically occupied local council owned housing which lay empty awaiting demolition and redevelopment. Having a statutory duty under the 1948 National Assistance Act to house homeless persons, councils were at times willing to tolerate these occupations on a temporary, licensed, basis. On rarer occasions, squatters were able to persuade the authorities to recognise them as a housing association or cooperative with a legitimate claim to permanent accommodation.

There was a much smaller incidence, in London, of organised groups squatting in privately owned city-centre properties. The greater publicity surrounding these higher-profile occupations contributed to an increasingly hostile coverage of squatting in the media focused on left-wing politics, alternative life-styles and drug-taking. Squatting was to draw a range of radical and marginalised groups stigmatised by the tabloid press, including proponents of free collectives, women's liberation, black empowerment, and gay rights.

From the late 1970s, coinciding with a retreat from post-war commitments to public housing, the law surrounding squatting began to tighten. In 1977, the Criminal Law Act defined conditions in which trespass, which has been a tort (that is, a matter for redress in a civil proceeding), could be considered criminal. These were broadened by the Criminal Justice and Public Order Act 1994 to include refusal to leave after being ordered to do so by a person entitled to occupation. Finally, the Legal Aid, Sentencing and Punishment of Offenders Act 2012 made squatting in residential property, in itself, an offence subject to a penalty of up to 6 months in prison, a £5,000 fine or both.

Within this constrictive legal framework, squatting in the 21st century, tends to involve protest actions or pop-up venues in non-residential property where trespass remains a largely civil matter.

== Early history ==
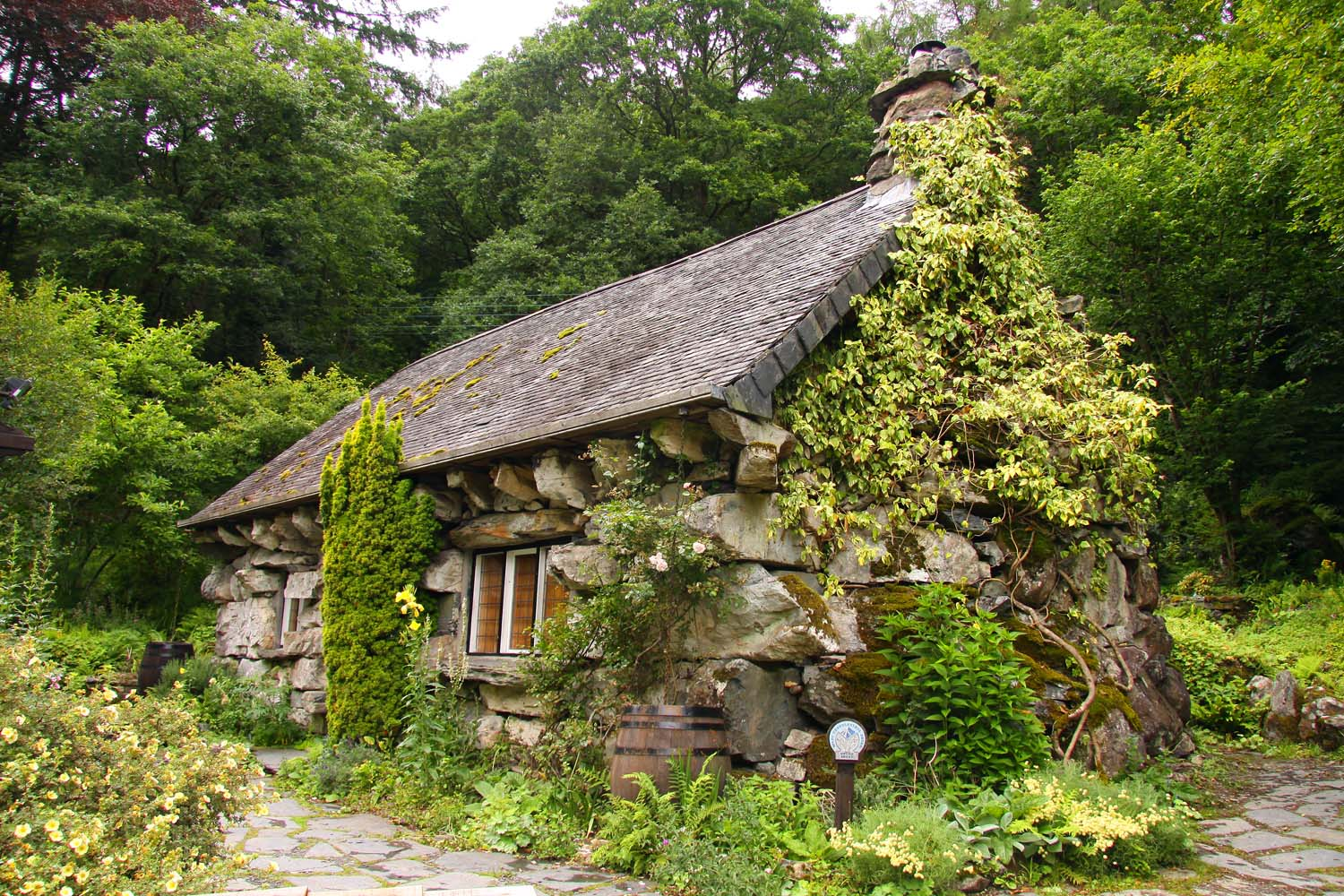
The Ugly House (Welsh: Tŷ Hyll) near Betws-Y-Coed, a relic of a tŷ unnos.

From the 14th century in England and, following its incorporation into the English realm, from the 16th century in Wales, enclosure forced the displaced rural poor onto wasteland and commons. They relied on a customary belief that a shelter erected overnight (a "one-night house" or Tŷ unnos in Wales) gave them a right to undisturbed possession. The Forcible Entry Act of 1381, a statute still cited by squatters to oppose or delay eviction in the 1970s, did establish a presumption against forcible repossession save in the exercise of a court order.

In 1649, at the outset of the Civil War, Gerrard Winstanley and others calling themselves the True Levellers occupied disused common land at St George's Hill, Weybridge in Surrey, and cultivated it collectively. They hoped that the action would inspire other poor people to defy enclosure and follow their lead. In The Law of Freedom (1652), Winstanley famously declared: "the poorest man hath as true a title and just right to the land as the richest man".

Squatting by the rural poor on what was recognised locally as common or waste land continued through to the end of the nineteenth century. In the early 1800s, Herefordshire's commons hosted almost a hundred settlements comprising ten or more dwellings. Commons and wasteland also accommodated workers in mines, ironwork and manufacture. In areas like the Forest of Dean and what became known as the Black Country and the Potteries, their informal settlements served as "nuclei" for new industrial centres.

After the First World War this pattern of self-built housing on marginal land was resumed by ex-servicemen and their families. On plotlands in the English southeast, chalets and sheds were transformed into more permanent accommodation. Although not strictly squatting, as occupiers were paying at least a nominal fee for their site, they fell afoul of tightening local planning bye-laws.

== Post World War Two ==
Urban squatting first becomes a major phenomenon in the wake of World War II. Memory of the failure of the Conservative-led coalition after the First World War to deliver on the promise of "homes fit for heroes" may have contributed to Labour's 1945 electoral landslide. But with the housing shortage rendered acute by the destruction of stock in the Blitz, it also encouraged organised direct action.

In July 1945, Time magazine credited a "bowler-hatted chimney sweep, Harry Cowley," with blowing "the lid off Britain's housing problem". In Brighton, at the head of 400 self-styled Vigilantes he moved families of servicemen into three empty houses. As military camps were decommissioned, the example was followed by families across the country. In October 1946, Aneurin Bevan, the Minister for Health and Housing, reported to the House of Commons that 1,038 camps in England and Wales were occupied by 39,535 people. But unwilling, as he saw it, to divert resources from new-build housing, he refused squatter demands to help patch up the Nissen Huts and improve services.

There was public sympathy. In August 1946, Clementine Churchill, wife of the ex-Prime Minister, protested that the "people are referred to by the ungraceful term 'squatters'" were "respectable citizens whose only desire is to have a home". A month later, in a "Great Sunday Squat" organised by members of the Communist Party, over 100 families assisted by the Women's Voluntary Service and, in some case, by police officers, occupied an hotel and flats at various locations in central London. Five of the leaders were arrested for conspiracy but were merely bound over to good behaviour. The squatters left the properties but did receive temporary accommodation.

Responding to the housing crisis, in the Town and Country Planning Act 1947 the Labour government gave local authorities wide-ranging compulsory purchase and planning powers and, scrapping Public Assistance Institutions (a last vestige of the old workhouse system), in Part III of the National Assistance Act (1948) made it their statutory duty to house the homeless. By the mid-1950s the Conservatives could boast an unprecedented 300,000 house completions a year, yet demand continued to outstrip supply and by the end of the decade funding for new developments had slowed.

== 1960s ==
=== The campaign for "family housing" ===
In the sixties, the publication of reports like the Milner-Holland survey on London's housing in 1965, TV dramas like Cathy Come Home (first broadcast in 1966) and the formation of Shelter, a national charity campaigning on housing, helped prepare public opinion for actions that might directly challenge the seeming complacency of the authorities. In November 1968, a group of homeless families and of anarchists, some with experience of direct action in the campaign for nuclear disarmament, launched the London Squatters Campaign "for family housing". This was against a background of the newly established Greater London Council (GLC) leading the city's borough councils in compulsorily purchasing aging private tenements which might then lie empty for years while plans were brought forward to redevelop the sites for new public housing.

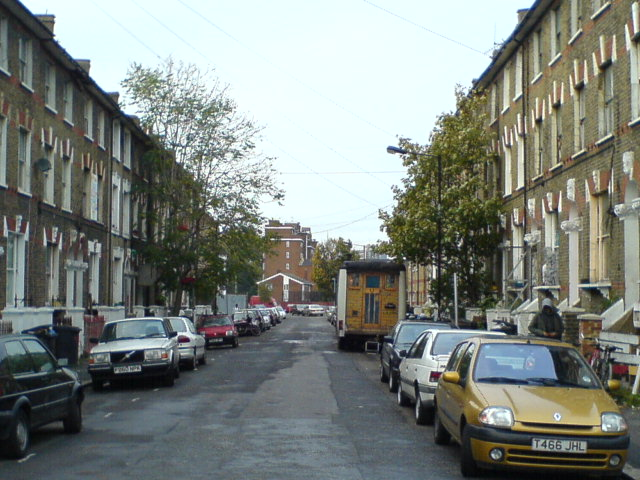
St Agnes Place, London, prior to demolition in 2007

The campaign's first major test was the occupation of 17 houses in the east London borough of Redbridge. After facing down the forceful efforts of private bailiffs, and with media coverage playing "a major part", the families and their supporters, persuaded the council to concede the use of empty properties under licence.The local authority had had to consider the costs not only of getting squatters out, but also of then having to provide those eligible for homelessness support with temporary accommodation in bed-and-breakfast hotels.

In the same year, 1969, Rastafarians joined in occupying a street of derelict houses in Kennington, south London, St Agnes Place. A High Court injunction prevented the demolition and, after an attempted eviction in 1974, the street was run as a housing cooperative. The squatted street featured a Rastafari temple (visited on occasion during the 1970s by Bob Marley), and a pirate radio station Rasta FM (which was raided by Ofcom in October 2005). Lambeth London Borough Council did not obtain an eviction order for "London's longest running squat" until 2005. Demolition was completed in 2007.

=== The "hippie menace" ===
What had seemed to be a "tide of public opinion .. . firmly in favour of squatters in Redbridge" (there was sympathetic coverage by the Sunday Times, Thames Television and the BBC), began to turn with the publicity a surrounding the occupation of a number of privately owned buildings in central London. In September 1969, the takeover of 144 Piccadilly, an empty mansion at Hyde Park Corner, by the London Street Commune, triggered an "open season for hippie-hunting and squatter-bashing in the press". Under the front page heading "HIPPIE THUGS: THE SORDID TRUTH", The People reported "drug taking, couples making love while others look on, rule by heavy mob armed with iron bars, foul language, filth and stench". The Times warned of Molotov cocktails being manufactured’ in preparation for a long siege. In the event, after seeing off an assault by Skinheads, "the Dilly dossers" were evicted with little incident.

1969 had also seen the much quieter occupation by a small group of local anarchists of an hotel on Eel Pie Island in the River Thames at Twickenham. In its one year of existence, 1970 the Eel Pie Island Commune was the UK's largest "hippie commune".

== 1970s ==
=== "Not a movement" ===
In 1973, Ron Bailey published The Squatters (Penguin) in which he described what he and other housing activists insisted was "the basic human reason why squatters occupy empty property and challenge the housing authorities".

[Temporary] accommodation and hostels were overcrowded, under-funded, and generally in poor condition . . . Welfare departments used the threat of eviction or taking children into care in order to discipline such shelters, booting occupants onto the streets during the day, placing bars on the windows and locking doors at night, as well as refusing husbands and fathers permission to visit. By 1971, there were in excess of 21,000 people living in such conditions, in addition to 1.8m families living in accommodation classified ‘unfit for human habitation’; 3m families living in slums; and 2m families living in accommodation classed as ‘badly in need of repair’.

Facing rising court costs when evicting squatters, local housing departments would gut their empty properties, rendering them uninhabitable by pouring concrete into toilets and sinks or smashing the ceilings and staircases. In London, however, it was the assessment of the Metropolitan Police Special Branch in 1976 that the local authorities generally ignored squatters unless eviction was pending, and that they provided "no real channels to help wean people away from the field". The Advisory Service for Squatters reported that they were getting referrals from social services, citizen advice bureaux, and even the police. Squatters recall Hackney Council inviting them to occupy "hard to let" flats.

The tabloid press, meanwhile, was portraying squatting as a political threat. What may have "started as a desperate resort by the genuine homeless", was now spreading rapidly at the direction of "extremist political groups" – Piers Corbyn, of the Squatters Action Group – was profiled as "a Marxist" – for whom "anybody's home" could be a target. While they were sufficiently concerned to infiltrate and monitor the squatting scene, this was not the view of Special Branch: squatting, they concluded, did "not exist as movement".

Various organisations purported to speak on behalf of the estimated 30,000 squatters in the capital (a majority of the 50,000 thought to be in the England and Wales as a whole): the Squatters Action Group, the London Squatters Union and the All London Squatters Federation. But Special Branch found that the "real activists" in these organisations were "limited to not more than about a dozen persons", and that the largest political tendency among squatters were the anarchists whom they judged to be neither a "unifying", nor – excepting those with "affiliations to Iberia or South America" – a particularly challenging, force.

Squatting did figure in contemporary anarchist thinking. Colin Ward, who in 1971 had become Education Officer for the Town and Country Planning Association, provided the practice with a philosophical and political defence in Housing: an anarchist approach (1976). At the end of the decade he was part of a collective that included, among others, Corbyn, Ann Pettitt, Steve Platt and Christian Wolmar, that produced Squatting, the real story, a compendium of articles offering insider knowledge primarily of the London squatting scene.

Of the squatters organisations founded in the 1970s, the east-London based Advisory Service for Squatters (1975) survives. The A.S.S. publishes the Squatters Handbook, now in its 15th (2024) Freedom Press edition. It serves as a guide for how and where to squat and explains the legal issues involved.

=== "Who are the squatters?": Twickenham ===
Broadly consistent with the Met's Special Branch assessment, a comprehensive survey of squatters in the outer London borough of Richmond found less than four percent admitting to a political motivation. The survey was of all the people openly squatting in central Twickenham on 9th September 1973: 112 adults (77 men and 35 women) who, with 16 children, occupied 18 houses in Grosvenor Road and four neighbouring streets, empty properties that had been land banked by the developer Bovis. While some people gave more than one reason for squatting, almost two thirds cited the shortage or cost of housing. Half as many (among them veterans of the Eel Pie Island commune) admitted to the attraction of "communal living". The surveyors noted a "strong community feeling" expressed in activities and projects, such as a play centre, cafe, arts centre, shop and studio. Three quarters of the, mostly young, adults "were available for work", and of these 90% had worked whilst squatting in Twickenham, and 61% currently had jobs. Less than 5% expressed an aversion to paid employment. Activities of those not working included painting, mending cars and motorbikes, helping to run the squatted cafe, and upkeep of the houses.

In 1976, after four years and with the Council's assurance that the families made homeless would be rehoused, the last of the squatters were evicted in advance of demolition.

=== Lambeth and the setting for the Brixton Riots ===
In Lambeth, the combination of extensive damage caused by the Blitz and large-scale slum clearance, which induced private landlords, in anticipation of compulsory-purchase cash, to hold properties empty and in disrepair, contributed to an acute housing shortage. It was felt most keenly by West-Indian immigrants and the growing Black community in Brixton. The Council was suspected of allowing Black overcrowding of properties go unchecked so as to reduce their statutory housing obligations. Following passage of the 1968 Race Relations Act, Lambeth had admitted operating "a policy of dispersal" that, in any particular area, effectively capped the number of "coloured" families they were prepared to accommodate.

==== Railton Road ====
In 1972, Olive Morris and Liz Obi, British Black Panthers, occupied a flat above a launderette in Railton Road. After fighting off attempts at illegal eviction, and taking cue from a group of white women who had also moved into the road to run women's centre, they opened a larger corner-shop building, 121 Railton Road, for the Brixton Black Women's Group and related activists. Others followed: by the mid-1970s there was a second women's centre; the collective producing Race Today (edited by Darcus Howe whose mentor and uncle, the Trinidadian historian C. L. R. James, lived, and in 1989 died, at 165 Railton Road – now the Brixton Advice Centre); the South London Gay Community Centre (evicted in 1976); Pearl Alcock's Caribbean gay shebeen (closed by the police in 1979); and a Claimants’ Union.

In 1981, Albert Meltzer, who established the Kate Sharpley Library (KSL) in the "121 Centre", recalls the police doing "their best" to blame the onset of the Brixton riots on his fellow anarchists, but that this "was rather difficult as the rioters were Black youths pushed by harassment". The trigger to the riots, which began in Railton Road, is commonly ascribed to the police's increasing use of stop-and-search and to tensions arising from the deaths of 13 black teenagers and young adults in a suspicious house fire in New Cross.

In the event, the 121 Centre, in which the anarchists also ran a bookshop, a cafe and a disco, was one legacy of squatting in Railton Road that was to survive the riots and their aftermath. The authorities saturated the area with police and social workers, and demolished half of Railton and neighbouring Mayall roads, clearing them of shops, homes and clubs.

==== Villa Road ====
Before the riots, there had been a quieter conclusion to squatting in another Brixton street. People started moving into Villa Road, which was due for demolition, early in 1973. By the summer of 1975, there were approximately 200 squatters including, in different houses, people professing to be anarchists, British Black Panthers, feminists, Marxists and primal screamers. They organised a street carnival; and maintained a cafe, a food co-operative, and a regular news-sheet, The Villain. After they began to build barricades to contest eviction, a High Court judge suggested negotiation.

The barricades were taken down in March 1978 and many occupants of the remaining buildings formed a housing association called Solon, which renovated 20 houses with Lambeth Council remaining as the owner. A park was developed on the demolished south side. The Villa Road squat was profiled in the 2006 BBC Four documentary series Lefties.

Solon also took over the 12 houses, back to back, on Railton and Mayall roads that had been occupied by the gay community. Initially decanted as single people into hard to let flats, through the self-managed Brixton Housing Cooperative the squatters were eventually given the opportunity to move into new flats that they, themselves, had helped design.

=== Central London ===
==== Tolmers Square ====
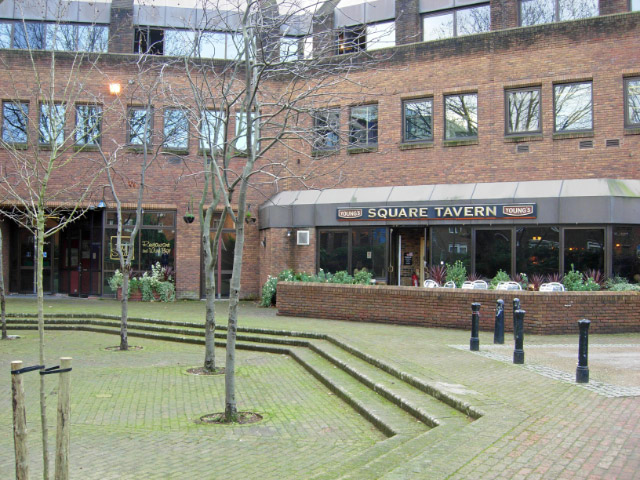
Tolmers Square, London, redeveloped, 2008

In 1973, Tolmers Square, between Tottenham Court Road and Euston station in central London, was occupied by more than one hundred squatters. Nick Wates and other students from the School of Environmental Studies (today, the Bartlett Faculty of the Built Environment) joined local residents in protesting the intended demolition of the square's Georgian terraced housing and its non-residential redevelopment.

The Tolmers Village Association was founded to represent the interests of small business owners, tenants, owners and squatters, allied against the council and the developers. A 1975 documentary film,Tolmers: Beginning or End?, written by Nick Wates and directed by Philip Thompson screened twice on BBC2.

The squatters were eventually evicted but many of the proposals made by their 1978 Tolmers Peoples Plan were included in a revamped scheme, which resulted in the council making a compulsory purchase of the land from the developer and building housing instead of offices.

==== Centre Point and Frestonia ====
In January 1974 an umbrella group of housing campaigners, including Jim Radford, Ron Bailey and Jack Dromey, organised a weekend occupation of Centre Point on the Tottenham Court Road to draw attention to the 32-storey office block left empty since its construction in 1966 as a symbol of property speculation amidst a housing crisis. Later in the same year, two streets of terraced Victorian cottages – Freston Road and Bramley Road – in the London Borough of Kensington and Chelsea, were entered by squatters who rigged up electricity, water and makeshift roofs. When threatened in October 1977 with eviction, they declared the "Free and Independent Republic of Frestonia" with actor David Rappaport as "foreign minister", and playwright Heathcote Williams as "ambassador" to the United Kingdom. The squatters later formed themselves into the Bramley Housing Co-operative which still owns the buildings, managing forty homes.

==== Huntley Street ====
In August 1978, in what reportedly was "the largest police presence ever seen at an eviction", 650 members of the Special Patrol Group cleared squatters out of 5 blocks in Huntley Street, behind University College Hospital. 160 people, some of whom were evictees from previous squats, had moved into the former police flats in February 1977. Their occupation featured a hostel for battered women established with the assistance of Women's Aid (who in 1975 had themselves occupied an hotel in Richmond as safe refuge), and offices for Piers Corbyn and his Squatters Action Council. Corbyn summarised the squatters case in the slogan "No [housing] waiting lists while homes lie empty".

Corbyn and Jim Paton of the Advisory Service for Squatters were convicted of "resisting the sheriff" contrary to Section 10 of the Criminal Law Act 1977. In solidarity, 150 Dutch squatters "besieged" at the British Embassy in The Hague.

Security on the barricades had been relaxed, because an agreement had been struck the day before with Camden's new housing chief, Ken Livingstone. As agreed, many of those displaced were given "short-term community" flats on a nearby estate in Kings Cross.

=== East London: Bengali Housing Action Group ===
In 1976, aided by Tower Hamlets Squatters Union and members of Race Today, a new-formed Bengali Housing Action Group opened up several blocks of flats in the Whitechapel-Spitalfields area to cope with the demand of Bengali families, many of whom had found themselves isolated in council housing estates. At its height, one of these blocks, Pelham Buildings, on Woodseer Street, was perhaps the largest squat in the country, with almost 200 families. With the National Front present in the area, the BHAG set up vigilante patrols to defend the community against racist attacks. The squatted properties were firebombed, and at one point the authorities cut off the gas.

When in 1977 the Greater London Council (GLC), overwhelmed by the numbers squatting across the city, declared an amnesty, granting squatters the chance to register and secure a tenancy, the BHAG drew up a map for the GLC defining a safe living area for the Bengali community. It was within this area, that the Bengali families were given tenancies, some in their existing squats.

=== Westminster ===
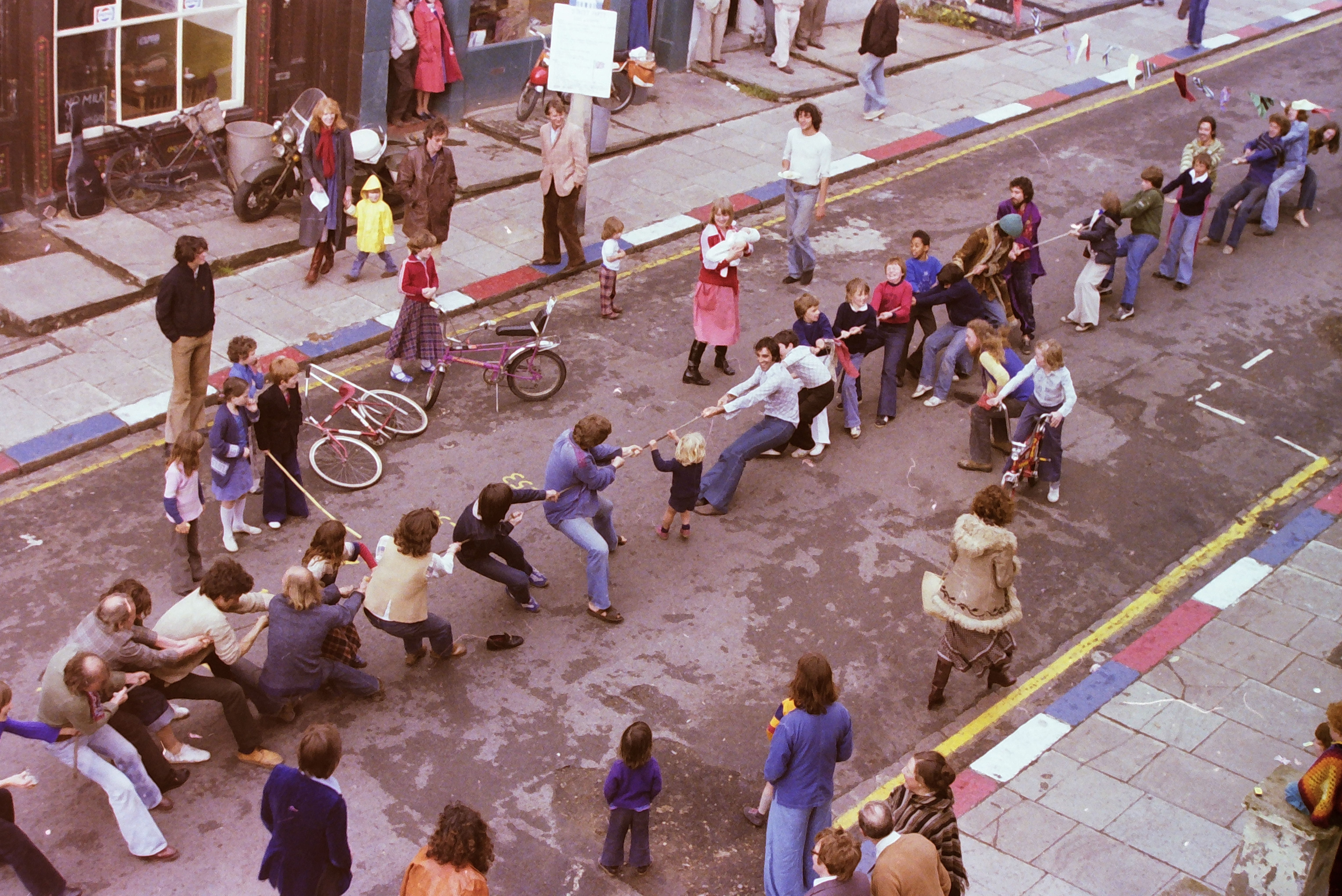
1977 Queen's Silver Jubilee street party, Bristol Gardens

==== Elgin Avenue ====
In October 1975, 200 squatters in Elgin Avenue in Maida Vale, west London, were gathered behind barricades when they learned of a last-minute evacuation and rehousing deal struck with bailiffs, the police and GLC officials. For their 3-year occupation, it was "a 'victory' of sorts", which Corbyn, as their spokesman, attributed to three factors: (1) a public campaign that "related to the whole housing crisis" so that support was won from the labour movement; (2) democratic organisation so that "everyone could join in and know that what they did was part of what everyone was doing"; and (3) a readiness to "defy the law" proving that the residents were "serious and not squatting for fun".

==== Seymour Buildings ====
Two other large-scale squats in the same Westminster City Council area negotiated settlements. Avoiding direct confrontation, but addressing wider housing issues, those who in 1975 occupied the Seymour Buildings in Marylebone, were successful, after more than a year's negotiation, in gaining Council's recognition as a legitimate housing association. Today members of the Seymour Housing Co-operative "collectively own and democratically manage homes across 3 sites".

==== Bristol Gardens ====
Save for a group of converts to Sufism, Bristol Gardens, on the edge of Little Venice, had not been an organised squat. Beginning in 1972, individuals had moved in as the GLC decanted the former private-landlord tenants. National publicity might have been avoided but for the presence of Winston Churchill's granddaughter, Arabella Churchill. In 1977, she and her neighbours took advantage of the GLC "amnesty" to become licensed, rate paying, occupants. They were nonetheless raided, together with squatters in the former Elizabeth Garrett Anderson maternity home in Hampstead, by the Met's Special Patrol Group. Doors were kicked in but no one in the street was arrested, suggesting to some that the purpose was intimidation not enforcement. By the end of the decade, the remaining 131 adults and 13 children were represented by a residents association in a deal with the GLC that promised, alternative housing in properties, uncommitted to waiting-list families, elsewhere in the city.

=== Women only ===
In the 1970s, most councils did not consider women fleeing domestic violence to be homeless. As a result, battered women turned to squatting and (as in Railton Road and Huntley Street) women's groups took over houses to provide them with support and refuge.

In addition to providing housing for homeless or hostel-bound single mothers and single women, feminists saw women squatting with women as a political choice: an opportunity to build community and to challenge patriarchal structures and capitalist norms associated with property and space. Women living in these squats shared domestic labor including cooking and childcare and learned skills in house repair, plumbing, gardening to become self-sufficient communities.

Through the course of the 1970s, there were women-only households, some serving as women's centres, in squatted communities on the Caledonian Road, near Kings Cross, in the streets behind Broadway Market in Hackney including, in an "oasis of lesbian communes", one terrace of seven women's squats on Lansdowne Drive, and in Brixton, Camden, Islington and Tower Hamlets.

In the late 1970s, women associated with the New Architectural Movement in London drew on the comparative freedom to reshape their own housing that they had enjoyed as squatters (to accommodate different living arrangements, spaces could be repurposed and walls knocked through with relative impunity) to broaden their critique of contemporary architecture and urban planning. A result was the Matrix Feminist Design Co-operative, in the 1980s a pioneer of participatory design and collaborative practice management.

=== Brighton: rival political currents ===
According to Bailey (1973), "outside London the longest and most determined squatting campaign took place in Brighton”. This would have been despite an early set-back. In July 1969, squatters occupying a row of 8 empty houses at Wykeham Terrace, property owned by the Ministry of Defence, were implicated in the fire bombing of an Army recruitment office. The squat had been the initiative of the Brighton Rents Project, an uneasy alliance of Labour Party supporters, anarchists and Trotskyists whose political factionalism further discredited the practice.

After a short hiatus, squatters returned, occupying by the mid-1970 approximately 150 properties. Many of these had been assisted by Bruno Crosby whose declared aim was to be "very conservative with a small c": "We move in, clean up, do repairs and tell the neighbours what we are doing. We treat the landlords in a reasonable manner." He renamed his Squatters Union, the Sussex Housing Movement and moved on to the board of Brighton Housing Trust where he helped broker a number rehousing deals.

As more squats were opened there was a renewed willingness to promote a militant, left-wing, critique of the housing market. In September 1975, an anonymous article in the Brighton Voice (issue 29) responded to arrests following a violent confrontation with bailiffs in Temple Gardens:

Of course squatting is an attack on private property: it should be. Not an attack on the houses themselves or a destruction of walls, windows or floors, but a principled attack on the iron law of property which rules our society, making it lawful for some people to have two, three or twenty houses and others to have none at all. It may be the law but it is not justice. squatting is one way of bringing a little bit of justice into this ruthless society.

== 1980s & 90s ==
=== Bonnington Square and the Pullens Buildings ===
In the early 1980s, there was a community of over 300 squatters within a ten-minute walk of the Houses of Parliament. Bonnington Square in Vauxhall, having been blitzed and left in disrepair in the 1940s, was due to bulldozed for a school and playing field. With the encouragement of local shopkeepers and a lone resident who had stayed in protest, the squatters were not deterred by precautions taken against them: bricked up windows, disconnected services, and concrete down the drains. They opened 65 of the terraced houses, established a vegetarian cafė and community centre, two community gardens, a milk bar, a nightclub and a wholefoods shop. It was a sufficient effort at regeneration to persuade the GLC and the Inner London Education Authority in 1983 to lease 25 of the houses to the squatters organised as the Vine Housing Cooperative.

Assisted by a network that sought local support for filling derelict "empties", by the mid-1980s squatters occupied more than 60 per cent of vacant council dwellings in neighbouring Walworth. From 1982, these included dozens of flats in the Pullens buildings, Victorian-era tenement blocks which, against resident opposition, Southwark Council was planning to demolish. In 1986, the squatters barricaded resistance to eviction, the "battle of Pullens", garnered national attention. The council agreed to renovation and, employing them to carry out the work of installing bathrooms and hot water, granted some of the squatters caretaker rights.

=== Impact of Right to Buy ===
In 1986, the expanded "right to buy" provisions of the Housing Act 1985 came into effect. Together with cuts in central government funding, these discouraged councils from acquiring private tenements on the scale that had given squatters their opportunity in Bonnington Square and Pullens. Local authorities had little financial incentive to purchase, refurbish or build homes, when faced with an obligation to sell them on to their tenants at a discount. Along with the overall stock of social housing, the number of local authority dwellings held vacant for repair, demolition or redevelopment – properties in which squatters might hope for some measure of tolerance – declined: in England, from 81,177 in 1986 to 33,246 in 1996.

=== Bristol: Cheltenham Road, BASE ===
Lower rents and the relative lack of lack of anonymity may have militated against squatting in smaller cities. Nonetheless, there continued to be sizeable squatting communities in Brighton, Bristol, Cambridge, Leicester and Portsmouth. Housing was not their only object. In Bristol, in the mid-1980s, squatters had the Full Marx bookshop, the Demolition Ballroom and the Demolition Diner, all on Cheltenham Road. In Easton, Bristol, a 1995 squat was the origin of what continues as the Base for Anarchy & Solidarity in Easton (BASE), a social centre with library and cafe.

=== Manchester: Hulme Crescents, Okasional Cafes ===
In 1972, Manchester undertook the largest housing development in Europe, Hulme Crescents, a brutalist complex of 3,284 deck-access homes, but construction and design problems were such that by 1984 the city council stopped taking rents. Until pulled to the ground in 1993, the sink estate, "vermin-ridden, leaky and almost impossible to heat", was colonised "first [by] the punks, then Smiths fans in overcoats, 'anarcho-crusties with dreads, big boots and a dog on a piece of rope' and later ravers from the burgeoning acid house scene".

Artists and musicians appeared to thrive amidst "All the things bemoaned as deleterious to family life . . . the complexity of the blocks, the noise and sense of height, the lack of a feeling of 'ownership' in the communal areas". At the same time, there was a "dark side" to the squatted Crescents: in 1977, "people living in Hulme were seven times more likely to commit suicide compared to the national average and thirty-one times more likely to be a victim of crime".

In the late 1990s, drawing on the networks and personal connections established in "second runway" protest camps at Manchester Airport, anarchists and Earth First! activists organised a series of squatted cafe-social centres across city. The "Okasional Cafes" featured events, including political meetings, exhibitions, film showings and fundraising parties. Typically, they avoided eviction by operating for operating for no more than a month.

=== London: self-managed social centres ===
In London, self-managed social centres and venues included, until its eviction after a six-month stand-off with police in 1999, the 121 Centre in Railton Road, Brixton. In the 1980s, the Centre printed a squatters news sheet called Crowbar and the anarchist paper Black Flag. In the 1990s, the centre hosted The Dead by Dawn Club whose attendees shared aesthetic interests, including zines, lectures by Sadie Plant, and intellectual literature by the Situationists, Deleuze and Guattari, and William Burroughs. The first Queeruption festival was held at 121 in 1998.

Black Flag was previously published in the Centro Iberico, a Spanish anarchist centre which had squatted an old school building on the Harrow Road. Also known as The Alternative Centre, in the early 80s it followed on from the Wapping Autonomy Centre as a venue for anarcho-punk.

Squatting in an abandoned Fire Station at 306 Old Kent Road, in the mid-1980s an Anarchist music group Bourbonese Qualk set up The Ambulance Station. It was a venue for hardcore punk that also featured artist studios, a cafe, recording studio, and print workshops.

=== Greenham Common and Twyford Down protest camps ===
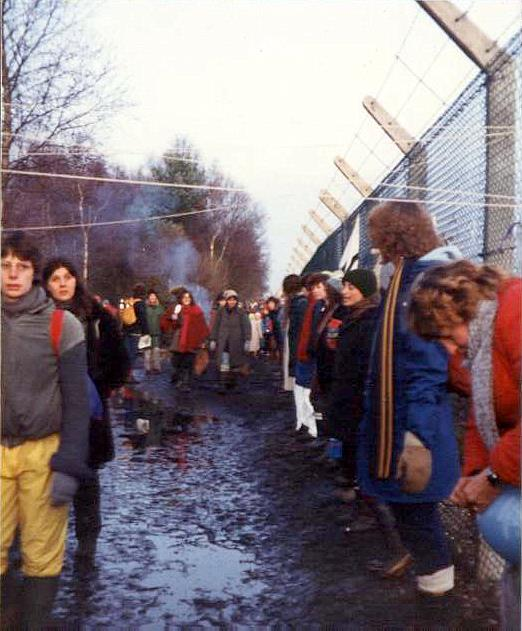
December 1982, 30,000 women hold hands around RAF Greenham Common

In September 1981, a Welsh group, Women for Life on Earth, initiated Britain's most internationally renowned squat, a series of camps established to protest the deployment of nuclear weapons at RAF Greenham Common in Berkshire. Greenham Common had survived as an open common until its wartime requisition in 1941 by the RAF. After the war, it was re-requisitioned for the United States Air Force (USAF) and in 1966 it became a NATO standby base. It was here that, in 1979, the government agreed to house U.S. intermediate-range cruise missiles, whose deployment anti-war activists believed greatly increased the risk of a nuclear exchange with the Warsaw Pact in Europe.

Realising that a march alone was not going to get them the attention that they needed, women began to stay at Greenham to continue their protest and attempted blockade. The Greenham Common Women's Peace Camp made international headlines when on 1 April 1983, about 70,000 protesters formed a 14-mile (23 km) human chain from Greenham to Aldermaston and the ordnance factory at Burghfield. The camp, and its defiance of the police, became a global symbol of the antinuclear struggle and of central role of women within it. In accord with the 1987 INF treaty, the last missiles left the base in 1991. A camp remained in place until September 2000 when protesters won the right to house a memorial on the site.

In 1992, Twyford Down near Winchester, Hampshire, became the site of a major road protest against a section of the M3 motorway from London to the south coast of England. As at Greenham, the protesters established permanent camps, which lying in the path of the motorway extension, was itself a resistance tactic. Squatting was used for same purpose in 1993 to protest M11 link road in London and in 1995 the Newbury bypass in Berkshire.

=== Brighton: Squatters Estate Agency ===
In 1996, a squatters group in Brighton, "Justice? Brighton's Campaign in Defiance of the Criminal Injustice Act", set up a Squatters Estate Agency which received national media coverage. Its corner shop displayed photographs of properties with captions such as "Easy to get in. Good condition. Been empty for a long time" and "Clean, nice but small. Alarmed with Chubb and Yale locks". In advance of a national homelessness campaign "to highlight the 'scandal' of more than 750,000 homes standing empty across Britain", in 1999 a similar estate-agency initiative followed in Nottingham.

== Legality: the introduction of criminal trespass law 1977-2012 ==
=== Forcible Entry Acts ===
Through into the 1970s, in resisting evictions activists cited the Forcible Entry Act 1381 (5 Ric. 2 Stat. 1. c. 7) which had created a statutory offence of forcible entry. Squatting advocates were satisfied that its proscription against making "any entry into lands and tenements, but in case where entry is given by the law" and "not with strong hand", implied that, provided they had used no force to enter the property, squatters could not be evicted save in the service of a court order. They had "squatter's rights". It seemed "simple enough".

Most empty houses had open windows, doors or other means of access. If squatters secured the property (for example by putting a lock of their own on the door thus making it impossible for the owner to enter except by force), then the owner could not enter and carry out an eviction without breaking the criminal law which few owners were prepared to do.

Although seemingly confirmed by the Forcible Entry Act 1623, it is not clear that the courts, at any time, consistently construed the 1381 law in this way. The issue was rendered mute by passage of the Criminal Law Act 1977, which abolished the offence of forcible entry and initiated the development of criminal trespass law.

=== Criminal Law Act 1977 ===
In 1972, the Law Commission's was given a brief "to examine the statutes of forcible entry 1381 to 1623 and relevant common law defences and to consider in what circumstances entering or remaining upon property should constitute a criminal offence or offences". Its initial recommendation was to make trespass criminal if the trespasser "failed to leave as soon as reasonably practicable after being ordered to do so by a person entitled to occupation". This faced not only opposition, mobilised by the Campaign Against a Criminal Trespass Law, from labour and student unions wary of the implications for on-site picketing and sit-down protest, but also express reservations on the part of the GLC and the Association of Chief Police Officers. The eventual act was informed by substantially modified proposals.

Section 6 of the Criminal Law Act 1977 covers the occupation of property. While repealing the Forcible Entry Acts, it did rule that, unless it is in the execution of a possession order, "violence for securing entry" is an offence if "there is someone present on those premises at the time who is opposed to the entry which the violence is intended to secure". The act did not distinguish for this purpose between violence to persons or property (e.g. breaking a door down).

But the act then created four further offences:

- Being on premises as a trespasser and failing to leave when asked "by a person claiming to be or to act on behalf of a protected intending occupier of the premises" (Section 7)
- Trespassing with a weapon (Section 8) •
- Trespassing on embassy or consular property (Section 9)
- Resisting or obstructing a bailiff or sheriff executing a possession order (Section 10)

The act was a "compromise": it made squatting “more difficult but not impossible". The Section 6 replacement of the offence of forcible entry, did mean that, unless they were physically present, squatters could be put out. At the same time, sections 7-10 made the squatters' initial entry more hazardous by establishing grounds for regarding their trespass (or conspiracy to trespass) as potentially criminal.

In London, the introduction of new law coincided with the determination of the new Conservative-elected GLC to end the council's role as a provider of council housing for rent. Council housing was either transferred to the London boroughs or sold off.

=== Criminal Justice and Public Order Act 1994 ===
The Criminal Justice and Public Order Act 1994 qualified Section 6 of the Criminal Law Act 1977 by giving the right of entry to "displaced residential occupiers", "protected intending occupiers" (someone who had intended to occupy the property, including some tenants, licensees and landlords who require the property for use), or someone acting on their behalf. Such people may legally enter an occupied property even using force as the usual section 6 provision does not apply to them, and may require "any person who is on [their] premises as a trespasser" to leave. Failure to leave is a criminal offence under section 7 and removal may be enforced by police.

=== Civil Procedure Rules ===
In 2001, the Civil Procedure Rules introduced new processes for civil repossession of property and related processes, under section 55. These include a fast track process whereby the legally rightful occupier can obtain an interim possession order (IPO) in a civil court which will enable them to enter the premises at will. Unlawful occupiers who refuse to leave after the granting of an IPO are committing a criminal offence and can be removed by police.

=== Legal Aid, Sentencing and Punishment of Offenders Act 2012 ===
The 13th (2009) edition of the Squatters Handbook still felt able to advise that, "with few exceptions, if you can get into an empty building without doing any damage and can secure it, you can make it your home".

In March 2011, Mike Weatherley, Conservative MP for Hove, proposed an Early Day Motion to put a definitive end to this situation. His campaign to criminalise squatting was supported by a series of articles in the Daily Telegraph in which Justice Secretary, Kenneth Clarke, and Housing Minister, Grant Shapps, were reported as backing the move.

The Government opened a public consultation entitled "Options for dealing with squatters". The campaign group Squatters' Action for Secure Homes (SQUASH), a coalition of housing charities such as Shelter and Crisis, activists, lawyers and squatters, noted that "over 90% of responses argued against taking any action on squatting." Kenneth Clarke, who had taken position that "there are no valid arguments in defence of squatting", nonetheless, moved an amendment to the Legal Aid, Sentencing and Punishment of Offenders Bill which became Section 144 of the act.

Section 144 states that "the new offence will be committed where a person is in a residential building as a trespasser having entered it as a trespasser, knows or ought to know that he or she is a trespasser and is living in the building or intends to live there for any period." It came into force on 1 September 2012, making squatting in a residential building a criminal offence, subject to a fine of £5,000, 6 months in prison, or both.

At the same time, the 2012 Act reduced or withdrew funding for the legal aid that enabled people facing eviction to seek relief through the courts.

=== Adverse possession ===
There remains a common law right (known as "adverse possession") to claim ownership of a dwelling after continual unopposed occupation of land or property for a given period of several years or more. Law in England and Wales allows for adverse possession claims range after 10 to 12 years, depending on whether or not the land is registered. In practice, adverse possession can be difficult. For example, St Agnes Place in London had been occupied for 30 years until November 2005, when Lambeth Borough Council evicted the entire street.

In 2007, the hermit Harry Hallowes won possession of a half-acre plot on Hampstead Heath in London. When In 2014, Keith Best, a builder, sought to do the same, and register title to a house Ilford, east London, which he had occupied for ten years, his application was denied on the basis that, since the introduction of Section 144 in 2012, he had been committing an offence. In a landmark ruling, the High Court reversed the decision, and granted the application: intended to help people, "like those who went on holiday and found that squatters had moved in to their home in their absence", 144 did not overrule established (adverse possession) law.

== After criminalisation: squatting in the 21st century ==
=== 2000s ===
In 2003, it was estimated that there were 15,000 squatters in England and Wales. In 2012, the Ministry of Justice believed the figure to be 20,000.

==== Social centres and community gardens ====
Linked through the UK Social Centre Network, in the 2000s there were squatted social centres in a number of communities. Among them were the OKasional Cafe in Manchester; the RampART Social Centre in Whitechapel, London and, part of Occupy London, the Bank of Ideas in Hackney, and a Wombles initiative, the "Ex Grand Banks Occupied Social Centre" in Tufnell Park. Opened in March 2004, Wombles resisted eviction in May, and again in July, thanks to support from the local community and its school children. One of those running the social centre explained its importance:

During a period of increasing privatisation, gentrification and desire for an easy profit, where community resources are being closed down and sold off by the council, and the closure of youth clubs coupled with the new Anti-social behaviour curfews mean kids have nothing to do and nowhere to go, there is an urgent need to reclaim our spaces from greedy property developers and run them ourselves to meet our real needs.

During its short life, the Tufnell Park centre hosted concerts and gigs, movement meetings, talks and discussions, an anti-copyright cinema, free Radio skill sharing and screen-printing workshops, free lunches for students, children's' days, English lessons, and a fair trade café supporting Zapatista communities in Mexico. Due to the involvement of some of the collective in organising against the G8 summit, it had come to the attention of the Met's Forward Intelligence Team who filmed and documented the centre's eviction from the former bank building in September.

Groups also squatted land as community gardens. Three such London projects were the Spike Surplus Scheme in Peckham, Kew Bridge Ecovillage and the Hounslow community land project. In Reading, "Anarcho-squatters", occupying a former women's information centre, left derelict by the council, opened a garden called Common Ground in 2007. Evicted, they re-claimed the property following year as part of the April 2008 days of action in support of autonomous spaces. Raven's Ait, an island in the River Thames, was occupied in 2009. The squatters declared their intention to set up an eco conference centre. They were evicted by police using boats and specialist climbing teams.

==== Squatting and the arts ====
In the face of rising rents and reduced arts funding, young artists continued to occupy abandoned buildings. Among the resulting artist-run spaces were the 491 Gallery in Leytonstone, and Lyndhurst Way in Peckham. The Da! art collective received national attention in 2008 when in Mayfair, central London, they squatted in a £6.25 million, 30-room, grade II-listed mansion owned by the Duke of Westminster. After being evicted, they moved to a £22.5m property nearby in Clarges Mews.

The progressive crackdown squatting was closing what may have been "a critical avenue enabling artists, musicians, filmmakers and writers to start out, compromising on secure housing for time, finances, space and community". With "the broke-artist lifestyle increasingly out of reach", in the new century there appears to have bee a marked reduction in the number of arts workers from working-class backgrounds.

=== 2010s ===
==== Arrests and prosecutions ====
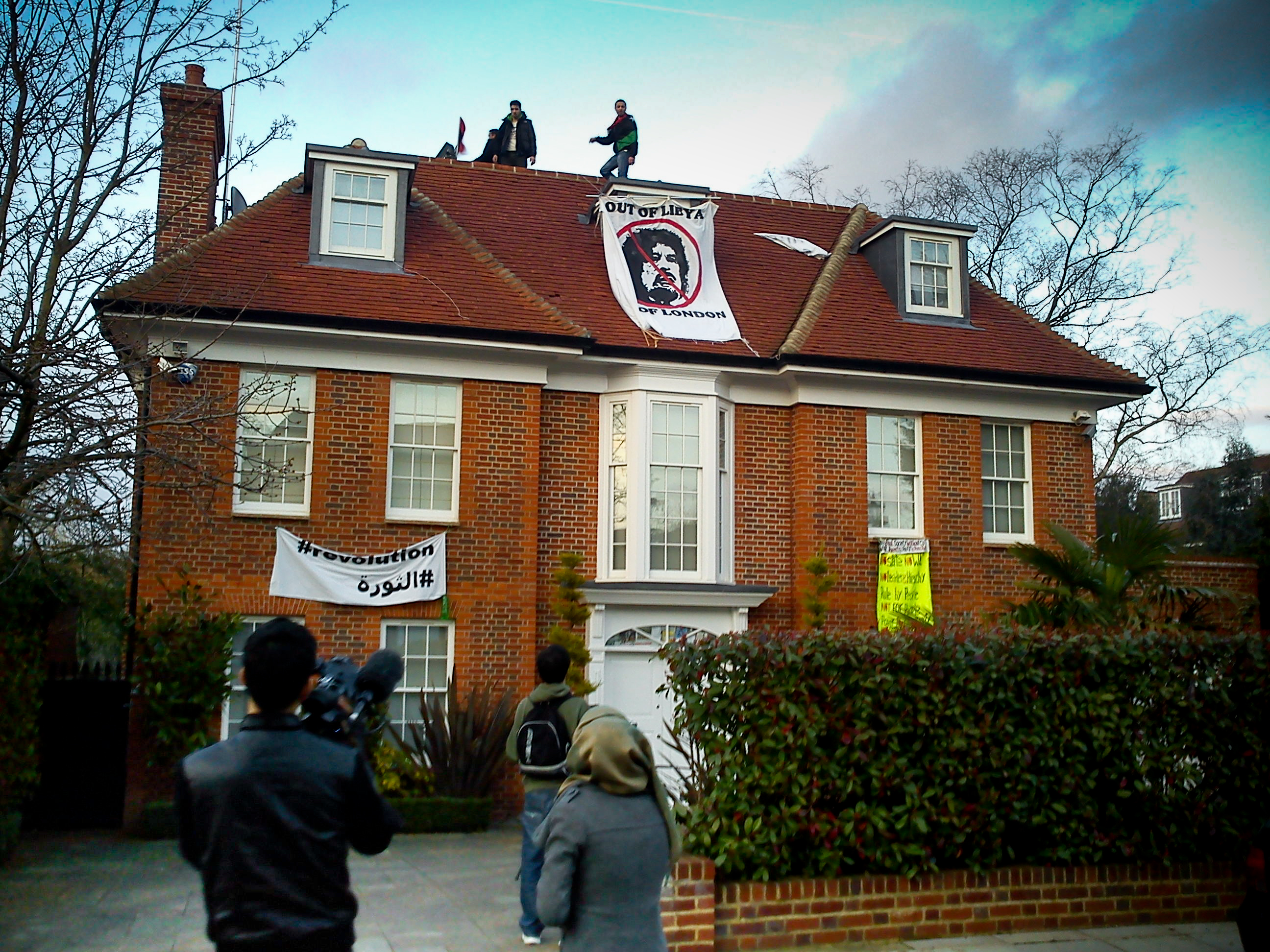
'Topple the Tyrants' occupy a London residence of Saif al-Islam Gaddafi in March 2011.

In September 2012, Alex Haigh was the first squatter imprisoned under Section 144 of the 2012 Act, receiving a sentence of 14 weeks for occupying a housing association property in London. By May 2016, SQUASH was reporting that under Section 144 there had been "at least 738 arrests, 326 prosecutions, 260 convictions and 11 people imprisoned.

The introduction of criminal trespass, coincided with the post-2010 austerity which drastically reduced central government contributions to local council capital budgets. This prompted local authorities to raise revenue by intensifying the sale of their remaining short-life properties.

==== Continued occupations and protest ====
In April 2011, a riot in Bristol was reportedly triggered by a police-assisted eviction of squats which had "created a space for parties, performances and exhibitions" in the Telepathic Heights area of Stokes Croft. A week later, police raided five squats in London, one, part of the Transition Towns movement, set up in protest against the building of a third runway at Heathrow. Alleging unnecessary and illegal pre-emptive action was taken against them, the squatters requested a judicial review of the policing tactics.

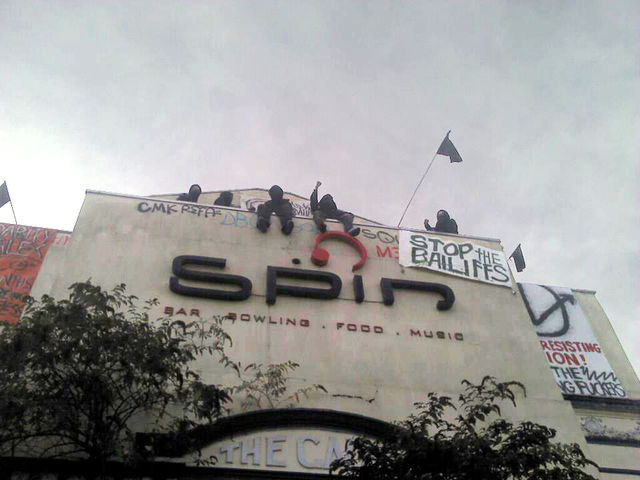
Gremlins on the roof of the squatted Spin Bowling building in Cardiff, 2012

Following the 2012 criminalisation of squatting in residential property, in Cardiff there were contested occupations of a vacant hotel, bowling alley and pub. Police and bailiffs were defied with the assistance of The Gremlins, a local anarchist group who linked their actions to the enforcement of Section 144 against Alex Haigh in London.

Due to the increased in the squatting of business premises, there were renewed calls from Conservative MPs to extend the criminalisation of squatting to non-residential property.

In London, a group calling themselves the Autonomous Nation of Anarchist Libertarians (ANAL) squatted a series of luxury mansions in order to bring attention to the housing crisis and the scandal of empty buildings. When they occupied the seven storey former Institute of Directors in Pall Mall, in March 2015, they claimed it was the seventeenth building in the area they had stayed in. Over the next two years, they were successively evicted from Admiralty Arch, from a £15 million mansion in Eaton Square, Belgravia, which they opened up to rough sleepers, and from a £14m mansion opposite Buckingham Palace.

Large scale evictions of social housing led to the use squatting in support tenants at risk of being decanted. In 2014, 29 young mothers living in Newham, east London, given notices of eviction from their hostel, refused accommodation in other cities such as Birmingham or Manchester and instead, forming themselves as the campaign group Focus 15, squatted empty flats in the Carpenters Estate. In 2015, one of the Focus E15 activists was arrested when she squatted a council flat in Stratford, in support of a mother who had been evicted. The charges were later dropped. In Sweets Way in Barnet 100 squatters held out for six months in 2015 until evicted with the last council tenant, a 52-year-old wheelchair user.

To bring attention to the "terrible crisis" in UK housing, in 2015, Left Unity, a political party promoted by Ken Loach, the filmmaker who in 1966 had directed Cathy Come Home, launched its manifesto at Ingestre Court, a squat in Soho.

In 2016, protesting cuts to government funding for domestic violence services and victims, Sisters Uncut, a feminist direct action group, reclaimed an empty council flat in Hackney as a community shelter and, in 2017, took over a building on the former site of Holloway Prison, demanding that the land be used for a women's centre and social housing.

Camelot Property Management, which placed so-called "property guardians" into buildings on-reduced rent contracts to prevent squatting, in 2016 had their own vacant offices in Shoreditch occupied in protest for two months.

The old Cornerhouse cinema in Manchester was squatted for five months in 2017 by the Loose Space collective. The collective, whose house rules were no hard drugs, no continuous drinking and no abuse, had previously occupied the Hulme Hippodrome. Theirs was one of 40 squats (including shelters and community spaces) evicted in Manchester between 2015 and 2018.

==== Raves and free parties ====
The 2010s saw a revival of the practice of using of abandoned buildings to stage raves and free parties, pop-up events that ignore licensing restrictions. In the early 1990s illegal warehouse parties had been virtually eradicated through the introduction under the Entertainments (Increased Penalties) Act (1990) of fines and prison terms for events organisers. Provisions in the Criminal Justice and Public Order Act 1994 were also designed to suppress illicit partying following an around-the-clock breakbeat, hardcore and techno festival on Castlemorton Common, outside Malvern, Worcestershire.

Free partying began to re-emerge in the 2000s, eliciting provisions in the Anti-Social Behaviour Act 2003 regulating parties of more than 20 people. Increasingly, however, free parties were becoming large enough (groups of 500 or more) to create potential for a riot if interrupted.

In the 2010s, the closure night clubs due to growing licensing and regulatory restrictions (in the ten years to 2015 the number in the UK had nearly halved), created a new space for squat parties. In London, reporting on squat parties became a staple of the local press.

=== 2020s ===
In 2023, with soaring rents and increasing destitution, the Advisory Service for Squatters was reporting "a rise in squatting for the first time in a generation". In July 2023, squats were reportedly opened around the UK on a national day of housing action organised by Housing Rebellion, an initiative of the climate-justice group Extinction Rebellion. Under the slogan “Housing For Need Not Greed”, the focus was on the further loss of social housing through the private-sector gentrification of former council estates.

While there have been a number of high-profile occupations ("Princess Diana's favourite restaurant in Knightsbridge", "Gordon Ramsay's £13m London pub"), a 2025 survey of the scene in London concedes that it is "not on the scale it was in the 1970s, nor as public as it was between the 1980s and the introduction of new police powers in 2012". But in a city "that is, at best, indifferent to those without money to rent or own property", squatting "keeps cropping up, igniting public debates around vacancy, ownership, housing crisis, and entitlement".

Even where their purpose is housing, squatters target non-residential property – empty shops, pubs, offices, cinemas, churches, warehouses – where the issue of criminal trespass does not immediately arise. They might post notices affirming that the property is "not a 'residential building' within the meaning of Section 144", that "at all times there is at least one person in occupation", and that any attempt gain entry and remove them without a court order is "a criminal offence".

== See also ==
- Homelessness in England
- Homelessness in the United Kingdom
- Squatting in Scotland
