= Squatting the real story =

1980 compendium

- Cover of book
- Language: English
- Subject: Squatting in England and Wales
- Published: 1980
- ISBN: 0-9507259-1-9

Squatting the real story is a 1980 compendium of articles about squatting in the United Kingdom, mainly based on projects in London. It was edited by Nick Wates and Christian Wolmar, and written by among others Piers Corbyn, Ann Pettitt, Steve Platt and Colin Ward. Contemporaneous reviews praised the detailed knowledge it presented and later scholars have acknowledged it as a useful historical document.

== Background ==
Squatting in England and Wales has a long history, with recent waves occurring after World War II and in the 1970s. The latter social movement was strong in London, where there were estimated to be 30,000 squatters. Squatting the real story was published in 1980 and contained chapters on different aspects of squatting, with the main focus being on anarchist projects in London. Contributors included Nick Anning and Jill Simpson writing about Villa Road, Piers Corbyn on Elgin Avenue, Ann Pettitt on squatting in the East End of London, Steve Platt on squatting in the 1970s across the UK, Colin Ward on the early history of squatting and Heathcote Williams on the Ruff Tuff Creem Puff squatters estate agency.

Writing about the book forty years later, Nick Wates (one of the two named editors alongside Christian Wolmar) stated that the book was self-published by a collective of 19 people. The publishing name of Bay Leaf Books was a play on the word bailiff.

In his introduction, Wates proposed that:

The most obvious achievement of squatting is the housing of thousands of people who would otherwise have been homeless. Tens of thousands more, living in overcrowded or slum conditions have obtained better housing. .. . The homeless cannot go on strike, and they have only rarely received adequate support from tenants’ and residents’ associations. In the absence of alternative ways of making their voices heard, squatting provides the homeless with a means of taking the initiative and with a focus around which to organise politically

== Reception ==
Reviews of the book in the 1980s praised its detailed insider knowledge of the London squatter movement. The London Journal called it a "hearteningly extensive survey of direct action on homelessness". The International Journal of Urban and Regional Research review judged the book "valuable" whilst also noting it was "written by squatters for squatters with a backward-looking slightly nostalgic feel". Contemporary scholars working on squatting have acknowledged it as a useful historical document.
