= Jason Cowley (journalist) =

English journalist, magazine editor, writer (born 1965)

- Born: 19 June 1965 (age 61); Harlow, Essex, England
- Education: Latton Bush School; University of Southampton
- Occupations: Journalist, magazine editor
- Organizations: New Statesman; The Sunday Times
- Website: www.jasoncowley.net

Jason Cowley (born 19 June 1965) is an English journalist, magazine editor and writer. He was editor of the New Statesman from 2008 until 2024. Prior to this, he was editor of Granta (2007–2008), editor of the Observer Sport Monthly magazine (2003–2007), literary editor of the New Statesman (1998–2002), and a staff writer on The Times (1996–1998). In 2024, he joined The Sunday Times as a commentator, features writer and book reviewer.

== Early life and education ==
Jason Cowley was born on 19 June 1965 in Harlow, Essex, where he was brought up. His parents were Anthony Cowley and Lilian Cowley.

He was educated at Latton Bush School, a former state comprehensive school in Harlow, followed by the University of Southampton, from which he graduated in 1989 with a first-class degree in English and philosophy.

== Early career ==
In the early 1990s, Cowley began publishing reviews, literary essays and articles in British newspapers and magazines, including writing for The Bookseller from 1992 to 1995. In 1996, he became a staff writer for The Times, during which period he was a judge of the Booker Prize for fiction. In the summer of 1998, he became literary editor of the New Statesman. Later he was a contributing editor of the magazine. In 2001 and 2002 he served as a judge for the Caine Prize, of which he is a council member.

In 2003, Cowley joined the staff of The Observer as editor of The Observer Sport Monthly magazine and as a contributor. Under his editorship the magazine won several awards. He left The Observer to become editor of the literary magazine Granta in 2007.

Cowley's novel, Unknown Pleasures, was published by Faber and Faber in 2000 and a second book, a work of narrative non-fiction called The Last Game: Love, Death and Football, was published by Simon & Schuster in spring 2009.

== Editor of the New Statesman ==
Cowley was appointed editor of the New Statesman on 16 May 2008. and took up his new position in September 2008.

Under his editorship, the New Statesman's print circulation increased from 23,000 to 33,000 by 2015, traffic to the magazine's website reached a new record high in June 2016, with 27 million page views and four million unique users, and the magazine has become profitable.

In 2013, he edited The New Statesman Century: 100 Years of the Best and Boldest Writing on Politics and Culture. It was published to celebrate the centenary of the New Statesman. In 2018, Reaching for Utopia: Making Sense of an Age of Upheaval (Salt Publishing), a book of Cowley's political and cultural essays and profiles, was published. In 2019, he edited and wrote the introduction to Statesmanship: The Best of the New Statesman (1913–2019), which was published in hardback by Weidenfeld & Nicolson.

Cowley stepped down from the editorship of the New Statesman in December 2024 but remains a columnist and contributor. In 2024, he joined The Sunday Times as a commentator, features writer and book reviewer.

== Awards and recognition ==
On 10 November 2009, he won the British Society of Magazine Editors' Editor of the Year award in the Special Interest and Current Affairs Magazines category. The judges said that Cowley had transformed the New Statesman and "created issues of the magazine that were the envy of the industry".

In 2010 and 2012, Cowley was shortlisted for the most coveted awards in the magazine industry, as Editor of the Year (consumer magazines) in the PPA Awards. In 2011, he was named editor of the year in the Newspaper & Current Affairs Magazines category at the British Society of Magazine Editors awards.

In January 2013, Cowley was shortlisted for the European Press Prize editing award. The awards committee said: "Cowley has succeeded in revitalising the New Statesman and re-establishing its position as an influential political and cultural weekly. He has given the New Statesman an edge and a relevance to current affairs it hasn't had for years."

He was named among Britain's most influential 500 people by Debrett's in association with The Sunday Times in 2015 and 2016.

At the 2020 British Society of Magazine Editors (BSME) awards, Cowley was named Current Affairs and Politics editor of the year for the fourth time, defeating rivals from The Spectator, The Big Issue and Prospect. "In increasingly tribal times, Jason Cowley continues to champion independence of thought and diversity of opinion, challenging his audience and producing a magazine that's imaginative, unpredictable and interesting," the BSME judges said, upon presenting the award.

In 2019, Cowley was shortlisted for the Orwell Prize for Journalism. In 2023, he was chair of the judges of the Baillie Gifford Prize for Non-Fiction's 25th anniversary Winner of Winners Award.

== Works ==
- The Last Game: Love, Death and Football. Simon & Schuster. 6 April 2009. ISBN 978-1847371850.
- Reaching for Utopia: Making Sense of An Age of Upheaval, Salt, 2018.
- Statesmanship: The Best of the New Statesman, 1913–2019, W&N, 2019.
- Introduction to Animal Farm by George Orwell (Macmillan Collector's Library, 261), hardcover – 7 January 2021
- Who Are We Now?: Stories of Modern England, Picador, 2022

Media offices
Preceded by Ian Jack	Editor of Granta; 2007–2008	Succeeded by Alex Clark
Preceded by John Kampfner	Editor of the New Statesman; 2008–2024	Succeeded by Tom McTague
