= Camelot (disambiguation) =

Camelot is the legendary stronghold of King Arthur.

Camelot may also refer to:

== Arts and entertainment ==
- Camelot (musical), a 1960 Broadway musical based on the legend
  - Camelot (film), a 1967 film based on the musical
- "Camelot" (song), a song by NLE Choppa
- Camelot (TV series), a 2011 television series
- "Camelot" (The Goodies), an episode of the British television series The Goodies
- "Camelot" (Stargate SG-1), an episode of the American-Canadian television series Stargate SG-1

== Buildings ==
- Camelot (State College, Pennsylvania), a house listed on the National Register of Historic Places
- Camelot (hotel), the original name of The Edgewater, a hotel in Seattle
- Camelot, Kirkham, a heritage-listed house in Sydney, Australia

== Companies and organisations ==
- Camelot Ghana, a printing company in Ghana
- Camelot Group, Former operators of the National Lottery in the United Kingdom from 1994 to 2024
- Camelot Property Management, a vacant property management firm started in the Netherlands
- Camelot Software Planning, a Japanese software publisher and developer

== Games ==
- Camelot (board game), a strategy board game marketed by Parker Brothers, mainly in the early 20th century
- Camelot (video game), a 1989 video game for Acorn computers, published by Superior Software

== Places ==
- Camelot Theme Park, a former theme park in Lancashire, England
- Camelot (ward), an electoral ward in Somerset, England
- Camelot (crater), a crater in Taurus-Littrow valley on the Moon

== Transport ==
- SS Camelot, a ship owned by the British Ministry of Transport from 1965 to 1969
- BR Standard Class 5 73082 Camelot, a BR Standard Class 5 steam engine preserved on the Bluebell Railway

== Other ==
- Camelot (horse), champion Irish racehorse
- 9500 Camelot (1281 T-2), an asteroid named "Camelot", discovered in 1973, the 9500th registered, see List of minor planets: 9001–10000
- Camelot era, a nickname for the John F. Kennedy Administration, stressing its glamorous, media-culture image
- Camelot, a document format that later became PDF
- Project Camelot, a 1960s U.S. government counterinsurgency study
- Camelot wheel, used for harmonic mixing

== See also ==
- Kamelot, an American power metal band
- Kaamelott, a French TV comedy series
- Camlet, a woven fabric that may have originally been made of camel or goat hair
- Camelotia, a dinosaur from England
- King Arthur (disambiguation)
