= Christian Wolmar =

British journalist and author (born 1949)

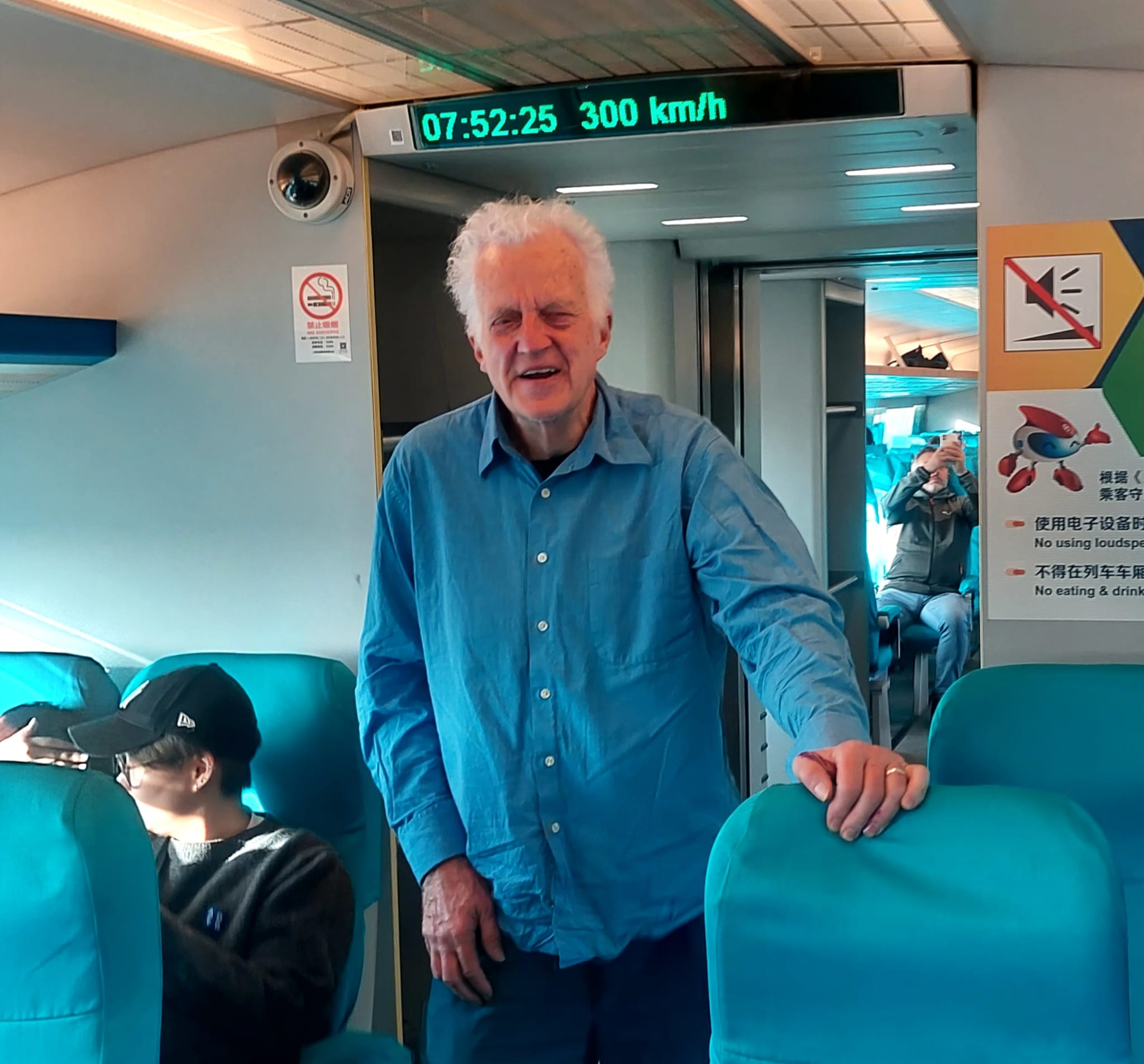
- Born: 3 August 1949 (age 77); London, England
- Education: Warwick University
- Occupations: Journalist, author and railway historian
- Known for: Transport commentary
- Political party: Labour
- Website: www.christianwolmar.co.uk

Christian Tage Forter Wolmar (born 3 August 1949) is a British journalist, author, railway historian and Labour Party campaigner.

He is known for his commentary on transport; the author of over 20 books on the topic, he is a pundit on Britain's railway industry and host of the Calling All Stations transport podcast. An advocate for cycling, Wolmar founded Labour Cycles, which encourages the Labour Party to adopt a pro-cycling agenda.

== Early life and education ==
Wolmar's father, Boris Forter, was born in Moscow and his mother, Birgit Lindblom, was Swedish. They met in London.

Wolmar was educated at Lycée Français Charles de Gaulle, a French independent school in South Kensington, followed by the University of Warwick where he obtained a degree in economics and was editor of the student newspaper, Campus. He then squatted at Villa Road in London, helping to save the street from demolition, and co-edited the book Squatting the Real Story.

== Life and career ==
Following his graduation from university in 1971, Wolmar worked for Marketing, Retail Newsagent, the New Statesman, and the London Daily News. In 1976, Wolmar joined the staff of drug users' charity Release, and stopped the use of its office (1 Elgin Avenue, London W9) as a holding address for the PIE, a paedophile activist group.

He was on the staff of The Independent (1989–97) and their transport correspondent for four years from 1992, covering the privatisation of British Rail by the Major government. He also contributed to The Observer and continues to write a regular column for Rail magazine and contributes frequently to several other magazines. His website has over 1,700 articles.

He was named Transport Journalist of the Year in the National Transport Awards in 2007.

Wolmar's books and columns mainly analyse the current state of the British railway industry and also cover railway history. He has long been an ardent critic of rail privatisation and argued that the structure contributed to the series of railway disasters in 1997 to 2001.

He frequently appears on TV and radio, both on history and news programmes. He speaks at transport conferences around the world, both on the railways and his concerns about driverless cars. As co-host of the Calling All Stations transport podcast he reports on transport news and policy, and interviews specialists from across the world of transport.

== Books ==
Wolmar's writings on transport, and in particular, railway history, include:

1998: Stagecoach. How the bus company Stagecoach grew from its roots in Perth to becoming a huge transport enterprise.

2003: On the Wrong Line. The story of rail privatisation.

2004: Down the Tube. An in depth analysis of the Public Private Partnership for the London Underground and its cost

2005: The Subterranean Railway: a history of the London Underground; Fire and Steam, the first major new history of the railways in Britain for 30 years.

2008: Fire and Steam, on the history of Britain's railways

2009: Blood, Iron and Gold, a history of how the railways changed the world.

2010: Engines Of War, on how the railways transformed modern warfare.

2012: The Great Railway Revolution on the history of the US railroads; an ebook version of On the Wrong Line: How Ideology and Incompetence Wrecked Britain's Railways; an updated version of the earlier Broken Rails.

2013: To the Edge of the World, a history of the Transsiberian railway.

2018: Railways and the Raj: How the age of steam transformed India.

2022: The Story of Crossrail.

2024: The Liberation Line: The Last Untold Story of the Normandy Landings

2025: The Rise of the Railway, how trains changed the world.

2026: Fast Track

He has also written two polemics: Are Trams Socialist? describes how Britain's transport policies have always been orientated towards favouring the motor car over public transport and Driverless Cars: on a road to nowhere suggests that the hype around this technology is greatly exaggerated.

Wolmar has also written a book on the abuse scandals in children's homes, Forgotten Children, published in 2000, and has written extensively about housing issues and local government.

== Politics ==
=== 2016 London Mayoral election ===
In September 2012, Wolmar announced his intention to seek nomination for the Labour candidacy at the 2016 Mayor of London elections. In June 2015, after cycling over 2,000 miles and speaking at over 100 events, Wolmar won six constituency Labour Party nominations, and went through to the final shortlist of the London Labour Party mayoral selection process.

Described by The Londonist as "the non-politician who wants to be mayor", Wolmar spoke at the five official hustings about his campaign vision for a more affordable, liveable and sustainable London. The campaign persuaded the eventual winner, Sadiq Khan, to push for the pedestrianisation of Oxford Street and to introduce the Hopper fare. He received just over 5% of the total vote.

=== 2016 Richmond Park by-election ===
Wolmar was selected as the Labour candidate to contest the Richmond Park constituency in the 2016 by-election and ran on a strongly Remain platform. He came third in the by-election, polling 1,515 votes, with 4% of the total vote, losing his deposit, as the Liberal Democrat candidate Sarah Olney persuaded Labour voters to support her campaign to keep out the incumbent MP Zac Goldsmith.

== Personal life ==
Wolmar lives in Holloway, London. He is a keen cricketer and distance runner, and plays tennis. He is a diehard football fan, having supported Queens Park Rangers (QPR) for over 50 years.
