= Ian Jack =

British journalist and writer (1945–2022)

Ian Jack FRSL
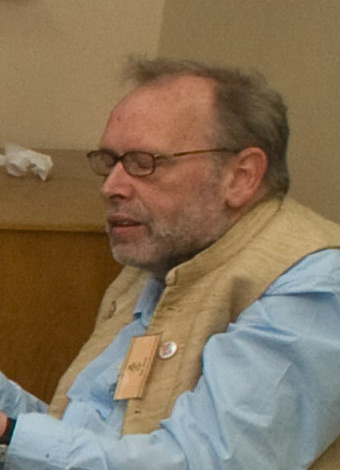
- Jack and Brigid Keenan at PalFest 2008
- Born: 7 February 1945; Farnworth, Lancashire, England
- Died: 28 October 2022 (aged 77); Paisley, Renfrewshire, Scotland
- Education: Dunfermline High School
- Occupations: Journalist; editor; author
- Years active: 1965–2022
- Spouses: Aparna Bagchi (m. 1979; div. 1992) Rosalind Sharpe (m. 1998)
- Children: 2

Ian Grant Jack FRSL (7 February 1945 – 28 October 2022) was a British reporter, writer and editor. He edited the Independent on Sunday, the literary magazine Granta and wrote regularly for The Guardian.

== Early life ==
Jack was born in Farnworth, Lancashire, on 7 February 1945, to parents who had migrated from Fife in 1930. Jack's mother, Isabella (née Gillespie), was born in Kirkcaldy and brought up in Hill of Beath, and his father Henry was born in Dunfermline. The family returned to Scotland when he was seven years old, in 1952. He grew up in North Queensferry and was educated there and at Dunfermline High School.

== Career ==
After a false start as a would-be librarian, Jack joined The Glasgow Herald as a trainee journalist in 1965. After a short time working in its head office, he was sent to work on two weekly papers in Lanarkshire, the now-defunct Cambuslang Advertiser and the East Kilbride News. Later he worked for the Scottish Daily Express at its Glasgow offices. In 1970, he joined The Sunday Times in London, where he became a section editor and then a foreign correspondent-cum-feature writer with a special interest in South Asia and particularly India, which he began to visit in the mid-1970s. From 1986 to 1989, he wrote for The Observer and Vanity Fair, and then joined the team that created The Independent on Sunday, which he edited from 1991 to 1995. His editorship of the quarterly Granta magazine, to which he had previously contributed as a writer, spanned 47 issues over twelve years to 2007. While at Granta, Jack also commissioned and edited books by Diana Athill, Simon Gray, Janet Malcolm and Travis Elborough, among others. He contributed regularly to The Guardian from 2001, and began to write a weekly column for the paper six years later. He occasionally taught at the India Institute, King's College London.

In 2009, Jack published a collection of essays and previously unpublished writings entitled The Country Formerly Known as Great Britain. One reviewer wrote of Jack's handling of time in this book: "He is up there with a fiction writer such as Alice Munro in his grasp of its ebb and flow, his awareness that its strong but rapidly changing currents often leave us wondering not only what we can remember, but what we should." Alexander Chancellor called the book "superb", and added: "Collections of columns and newspaper articles are not usually a very good idea. They quickly become stale and dated, and one sometimes wonders what the point of them is except to deceive journalists into thinking that their ephemeral scribblings deserve some permanence. Jack is an exception to the rule." The Economist wrote: "At the heart of the book are three magnificent essays, about the Hatfield train crash of 2000; the sinking of the Titanic and the film Titanic (1997); and the lost cinemas of Farnworth, Mr Jack's home town, which is also a circuitous epitaph for a lost brother. His contributions to 'this unequal struggle to preserve and remember' cumulatively transcend journalism and attain the status of literature."

Jack's awards included Journalist of the Year (Granada TV's What the Papers Say award, 1985), Reporter of the Year (British Press Awards, 1988) and Editor of the Year (Newspaper Industry Awards, 1993). He was a Fellow of the Royal Society of Literature.

In 2011, London's National Portrait Gallery purchased a portrait of Jack by photographer Denis Waugh for its permanent collection.

== Personal life and death ==
Jack married Aparna Bagchi in 1979; the couple divorced in 1992. He lived in Highbury, London, with his second wife, Lindy Sharpe. They had two children, and spent a part of every year on the Isle of Bute in the Firth of Clyde.

Jack's paternal grandmother was born in India and lived with his grandfather in the now-demolished mining village of Lassodie, between Dunfermline and Kelty.

Jack died from acute pancreatitis in Paisley, Renfrewshire, on 28 October 2022, aged 77.

== Bibliography as author ==
- Jack, Ian (1987). Before the Oil Ran Out: Britain 1977–86. London: Secker & Warburg. ISBN 0-436-22020-2.
- —— (2001). The Crash that Stopped Britain. London: Granta. ISBN 1-86207-468-2. (originally from Granta 73)
- —— (2009). The Country Formerly Known as Great Britain. London: Jonathan Cape. ISBN 978-0-224-08735-3.
- —— (2013). Mofussil Junction. New Delhi: Penguin. ISBN 978-0-670-08644-3.

== Bibliography as editor/contributor ==
- Athill, Diana (2009). Life Class: The Selected Memoirs of Diana Athill. London: Granta. ISBN 9781847081469. Introduction by Ian Jack.
- Chaudhuri, Nirad (2001). The Autobiography of An Unknown Indian. New York: New York Review of Books Classics. ISBN 9780940322820. Introduction by Ian Jack.
- Jack, Ian, ed. (2015). Granta 130 India: Another Way of Seeing. London: Granta. ISBN 9781905881857.
- Jack, Ian, ed. (2005). The Granta Book of India. London: Granta/Grove Press. ISBN 9781862077843.
- Jack, Ian, ed. (1998). The Granta Book of Reportage. London: Granta. ISBN 9781862071933.
- Jack, Ian, ed. (1998). The Granta Book of Travel. London: Granta. ISBN 978-1862071100.
- Malcolm, Janet (2004). The Journalist and the Murderer. London: Granta. ISBN 9781862076372. Introduction by Ian Jack.
- Jack, Ian (1987). Before the Oil Ran Out: Britain, 1976–86. Secker & Warburg.

Media offices
Preceded by Stephen Glover	Editor of The Independent on Sunday; 1991–1995	Succeeded by Peter Wilby
Preceded by Bill Buford	Editor of Granta; 1995–2007	Succeeded by Jason Cowley
