= Da! collective =

Art collective based in London

The DA! collective is an art collective that squats in London, England, co-founded by Simon and Bogna McAndrew, Stephanie Smith, Samuel Conrad, Julika Vaci, Aishlinn Dowling, Sam Padfield and Murat Bulut Aysan. After squatting in three buildings, they received national attention when they squatted a townhouse in Mayfair, Westminster, Greater London in October 2008. The property, at 18 Upper Grosvenor Street, is a 30-room grade II-listed 1730s mansion worth an estimated £6.25 million owned by the billionaire Duke of Westminster, Britain's wealthiest private landlord.

== Formation and First Three Spaces ==
Simon McAndrew (b. 1979), a hairdresser, co-founded DA! after squatting at Chez Robert in Paris. In 2005, he and partner Bogna McAndrew formed "a London equivalent of Chez Robert" in a six-story home on Kensington High Street. The collective has been self described as "a mix of visual, performance and conceptual artists, writers, musicians, thinkers, art students, students of other disciplines." McAndrew and Bogna lived in the home for a year, and attracted new members such as Stephanie Smith. DA! continued to use spots at Knightsbridge and Tottenham Court Road before finding the spot at Grosvenor Street.

== Grosvenor Street Squatting and Media Attention ==
The group had been observing the home for six months, putting tape on the keyhole to see if it was in use and checking the letterbox. One October 2010 night, several members wore high-visibility jackets (such as a construction worker) and climbed to an unlocked window. The members held a 24-hour occupancy in keeping with Land Registration Act 2002, which states that squatters must occupy for ten years before applying for ownership - at the time, squatting in a residential property was still a civil offense. McAndrew referred to this space as MADA!, combining "MA" from Mayfair with DA!.

In a statement delivered from the balcony (bedecked with a blacked-out tattered Union Jack), Stephanie Smith declared:

Who we are is not important. As a collective we have 'squatted' an empty, dilapidated building in Mayfair ... We are making this place live through the exchange of knowledge and ideas.

Two art shows were put on in MADA! on 8 November and 21 November. Visual installations, music, and performance art were among the projects displayed in the home.

By the end of November 2010, DA! was given an eviction notice by lease owners Deltaland Resources Ltd. and left Grosvenor Street.

== After Grosvenor ==
=== "The Temporary School of Thought" ===
Immediately after being evicted, DA! occupied a £22.5m property nearby in Clarges Mews. This project was titled "The Temporary School of Thought", and featured free and open group activities such as deschooling sessions, labyrinth-building and French book-binding. They remained undetected until the lease owners, Timekeeper Ltd., noticed a Christmas tree in the window. In mid-December 2010, they were evicted from this property.

=== m@ke-u.se ===
In 2011, McAndrew started a project called InEmptyBuildings - later named ma.ke-u.se (stylized as m@ke-u.se) which aimed to "enable artists, to support and stimulate each other; by using vacant commercial buildings in central London, at very low cost, on a short term basis." Later, as the Legal Aid, Sentencing and Punishment of Offenders Act 2012 implemented harsher offenses for squatting, the project shifted to creating a "practical, media savvy, pro-squatting campaign to reverse the direction in which the law is currently heading". m@ke-u.se has not been updated since March 2014.

=== Possible Resurrection ===
After lying dormant with no projects for three years, the DA! Facebook page hinted in December 2013 "Is 2014 the year DA! returns?" The Facebook page has remained active.

== See also ==
- Artivist
- Squatting in England
- !WOWOW! - a similar art collective that squats in London
