= Ian Hargreaves =

British academic

Ian Richard Hargreaves CBE (born 18 June 1951 in Burnley) is professor emeritus (formerly Prof Digital Economy) at Cardiff University, Wales, UK.

== Career ==
His career in British journalism includes several beats at the Financial Times, as well as Directorship of BBC News & Current Affairs, Editorship of The Independent, and Editorship of the New Statesman.

In October 2010 he was invited to head an independent commission to consider "how the Intellectual Property framework supports growth and innovation" by the UK Prime Minister David Cameron. The resulting report was published in May 2011. The government declared its intention to implement the review's findings, which include a more flexible approach to copyright, in August 2011.

Hargreaves was appointed Commander of the Order of the British Empire (CBE) in the 2012 Birthday Honours for services to the creative economy and higher education.

In 2015, he became a co-founder of Creative Cardiff, with Justin Lewis.

== Personal life ==
He attended Burnley Grammar School in Burnley and Altrincham Grammar School for Boys. He was educated at Queens' College, Cambridge, where he read English with French. He married Elizabeth Crago in 1972. They divorced in 1991 and have a son (born 1975) and a daughter (born 1977). In 1993 he married Adele Blakebrough, CEO of the Social Business Trust and they have two daughters (born in January 1997 and May 1998).

== Bibliography ==
- 2003 Journalism: Truth or Dare? Oxford University Press.
- 2005 Journalism – A very short Introduction, Oxford University Press

== See also ==
- Independent review of intellectual property and growth website
- Cardiff Centre for Journalism Studies website
- Moral Maze bio
- Community Action Network website

Media offices
Preceded by Andreas Whittam Smith	Editor of The Independent; 1994–1995	Succeeded by Charles Wilson
Preceded by Steve Platt	Editor of the New Statesman; 1996–1998	Succeeded by Peter Wilby
