= Max Roach Park =

Public park in Brixton, London, England

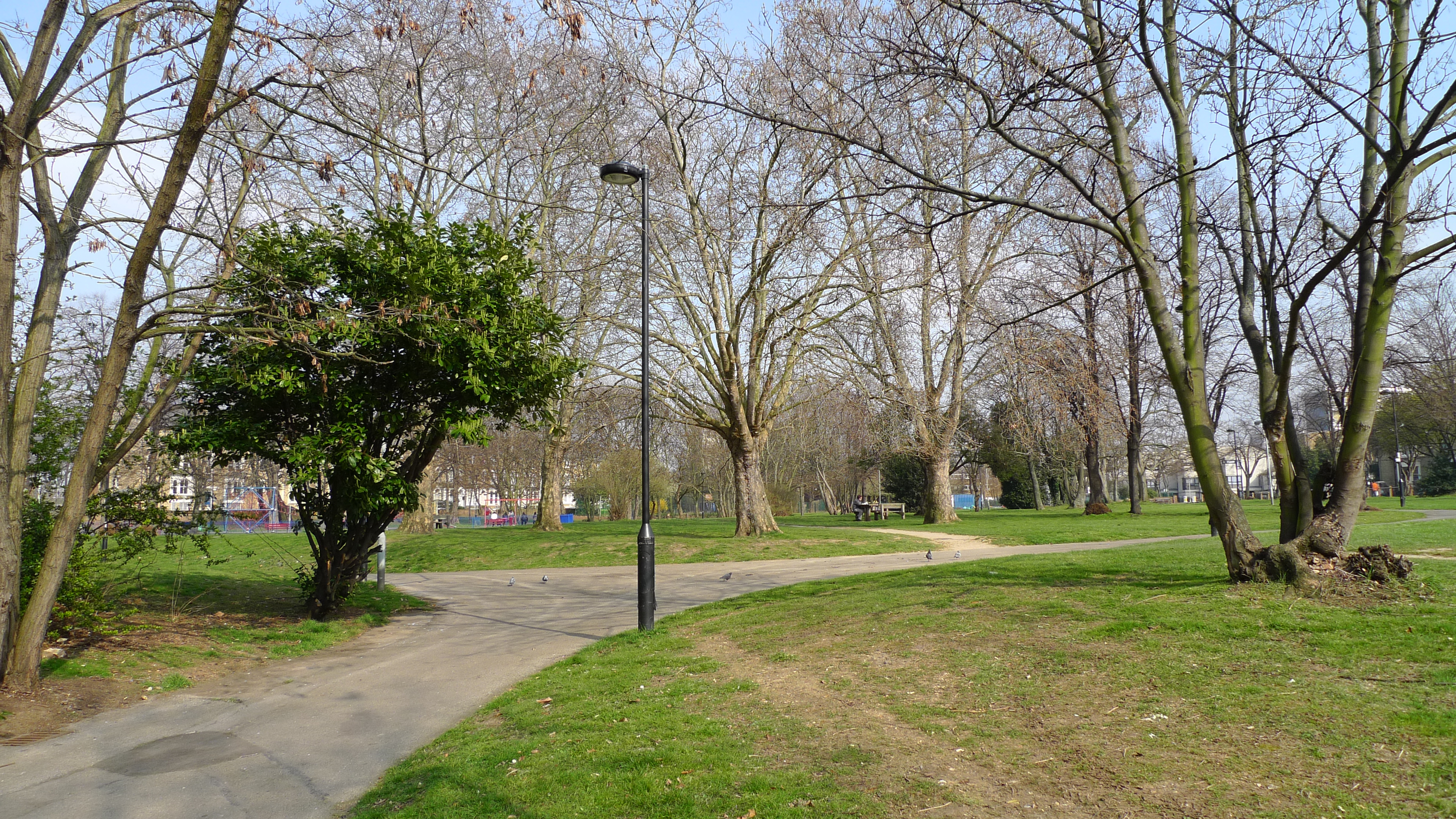
- Max Roach Park

- Location within Greater London
- Type: Public park
- Location: London, England
- Coordinates: 51°28′00″N 0°06′42″W
- Operator: Lambeth Council
- Status: Open year round
- Website: www.lambeth.gov.uk/parks/max-roach-park

Max Roach Park is a public park in Brixton in the London Borough of Lambeth, London, United Kingdom. It is named after the African-American jazz drummer Max Roach, who visited the park in 1986.

The park includes a One O'Clock Club and children's playground, which have been under threat from funding cuts. Demonstrations against cuts to youth services began in 2011, but Lambeth Council says it is trying to find a way to maintain some level of service despite budget cuts. There is a nature trail that extends to Rush Common.

== Construction ==
The park was constructed from 1978. Earlier, the site had terrace houses on it (similar to those extant on the north side of Villa Road to the north of the park) until 1978, when they were demolished as part of the Brixton Development Plan. Prior to this, from 1974, squatters had occupied these properties in order to protest against this plan. In 1978, the squatters were rehoused by the authority, and demolition went ahead for the park.

The park was initially called Angell Park, after the local area Angell Town

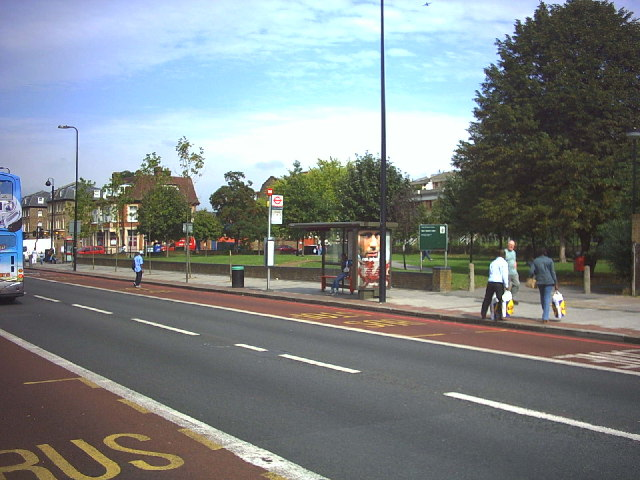
View from Brixton Road

In 1986, Lambeth Labour Party councillor Sharon Atkin persuaded the council to name 27 sites in the borough "to acknowledge contributions by people of African descent". Other streets were renamed after Francis Barber, a Jamaican manservant of Dr Johnson with ties to Streatham, and Olympic javelin champion Tessa Sanderson. Additional places were named after musical figures such as Roach, gospel singer Mahalia Jackson, and Jamaican saxophonists Joe Harriott and Harold McNair. The opening of Max Roach Park was timed to coincide with Roach's GLC-sponsored visit to London, and he attended its opening along with Councillor Atkin and the drummer Ken Gordon, uncle of Moira Stuart.
