= Peter Wilby =

British journalist (born 1944)

Peter John Wilby (born 7 November 1944) is a British journalist. He is a former editor of The Independent on Sunday and the New Statesman.

== Early life and career ==
Wilby was educated at Kibworth Beauchamp Grammar School in Leicestershire before gaining a place at Sussex University. Whilst at Sussex, from which he graduated with a degree in history, he helped found a short-lived university paper called Sussex Outlook.

In 1968, he began his career as a reporter on The Observer, becoming Education Correspondent four years later. In the same role, he worked for the New Statesman (1975–77), and for The Sunday Times (1977–86).

Wilby joined The Independent on Sunday in 1990 and eventually became its editor (1995–96).

== New Statesman editor ==
Wilby was the editor of the New Statesman from 1998 to 2005.

In February 2002, Wilby apologised and took personal responsibility for running the cover of the 14 January 2002 issue. It featured the headline "A Kosher Conspiracy", promoting articles by Dennis Sewell and John Pilger respectively concerning the alleged Zionist lobby in Britain and Tony Blair's appointment of Michael Levy as his special envoy in the Middle East. The NS cover was denounced by David Triesman, then general secretary of the Labour Party, as being antisemitic. Wilby, in his apology, wrote that the cover was "not intended to be anti-Semitic".

"I don't accept that there's such a thing as New Labour", Wilby told David Lister of The Independent in July 2002. He described the term as being "an invention of the marketing people close to the Labour leader". A scoop Wilby was fond of at the time concerned an interview with the physician, professor and Labour peer Robert Winston. Winston's comparison of the National Health Service (NHS) with health provision in Poland had, said Wilby, changed government policy.

Julia Langdon wrote in the British Journalism Review around the same time that the NS under Wilby had a reputation in the "political trade" for "being either dull, or silly". With Wilby as editor, it had become "ever more critical of the Government, notably with the anti-American line he took after September 11". A New Statesman article in autumn 2004 by Robert Service, then Professor of Russian History at Oxford University, and in particular the cover illustration, portrayed Tony Blair as the modern equivalent of Joseph Stalin.

Wilby's deputy, Cristina Odone, resigned in early November 2004 for unconnected reasons, although she did object to the cover. Odone and Wilby praised each other in the media and denied having had a row, although claims of such professional disagreements, quoting Odone herself, were made in the press. Wilby, she said, was "the old-fashioned socialist who" remained "true to his ideals".

Wilby himself was dismissed from the post of editor in 2005 by then-owner Geoffrey Robinson. As a result of the magazine being unsympathetic to New Labour, Cristina Odone wrote in The Observer that she believed Wilby was pushed out of his post in preparation for Gordon Brown becoming prime minister. Wilby was the longest serving editor of the New Statesman since Kingsley Martin, who had retired from the post in 1960.

While circulation was much the same when Wilby assumed the role as when he relinquished it in 2005, he wrote in an article for the British Journalism Review that he had managed to turn "a substantial financial loss into a healthy operating profit".

== Later career ==
Wilby continued to write a weekly "First Thoughts" column for the New Statesman. He also wrote for The Observer and The Guardian. Wilby claims to live "quietly and unfashionably" in Loughton. He identifies as a feminist and a republican.

== Criminal conviction ==
Wilby was arrested by the National Crime Agency (NCA) at his home in Essex in October 2022. In August 2023, he was convicted at Chelmsford Crown Court of making indecent images of children. For this he was given a 10-month jail sentence (suspended for two years), a 10-year sexual harm prevention order, and was placed on the sex offenders register for five years. He admitted to having a sexual interest in children and to having viewed indecent images of them since the 1990s.

Dean Nelson — a journalist who worked for newspapers employing Wilby — asserts that Wilby used his journalism to denigrate child sexual abuse victims, and his senior editorial positions to suppress proposed articles on child sexual abuse.

Media offices
Preceded by Ian Jack	Editor of The Independent on Sunday; 1995–1996	Succeeded by Rosie Boycott
Preceded by Ian Hargreaves	Editor of the New Statesman; 1998–2005	Succeeded by John Kampfner
