= Tom McTague =

British author and journalist

Thomas McTague
- McTague in 2026
- Occupations: Author, journalist
- Known for: Editor of The New Statesman

Thomas McTague is a British author and journalist. He has been editor of The New Statesman since 2025.

== Career ==
McTague grew up in County Durham in the North East of England and attended Woodham Comprehensive School, Newton Aycliffe.

McTague started his career as a three-year trainee journalist at the Daily Mirror. He became political correspondent for the Daily Mirror from 2011 to 2014, deputy political editor of MailOnline from 2014 to 2015, political editor of The Independent on Sunday 2015 to 2016 and chief UK correspondent of Politico from 2016 to 2019. McTague then was political editor of UnHerd for two years, and a staff writer for The Atlantic.

McTague was appointed editor of The New Statesman in March 2025, having been acting editor since the start of 2025. He launched his editorship with a long-form profile of the prime minister Keir Starmer, after accompanying Starmer on foreign visits.

In 2020, he was highly commended in the Society of Editors Political Commentator of the Year award class. In 2021, he was shortlisted for the Orwell Prize for journalism.

In September 2025, he published Between the Waves: The Hidden History of a Very British Revolution 1945–2016. The book discusses the history of the relationship between Britain and Europe. The book was longlisted for the Baillie Gifford Prize for Non-Fiction.

== Bibliography ==
- Between the Waves: The Hidden History of a Very British Revolution 1945–2016 (2025) ISBN 978-1529083125
