= Kew Bridge Ecovillage =

Former land squat in London

Coordinates: 51.488°N 0.288°W

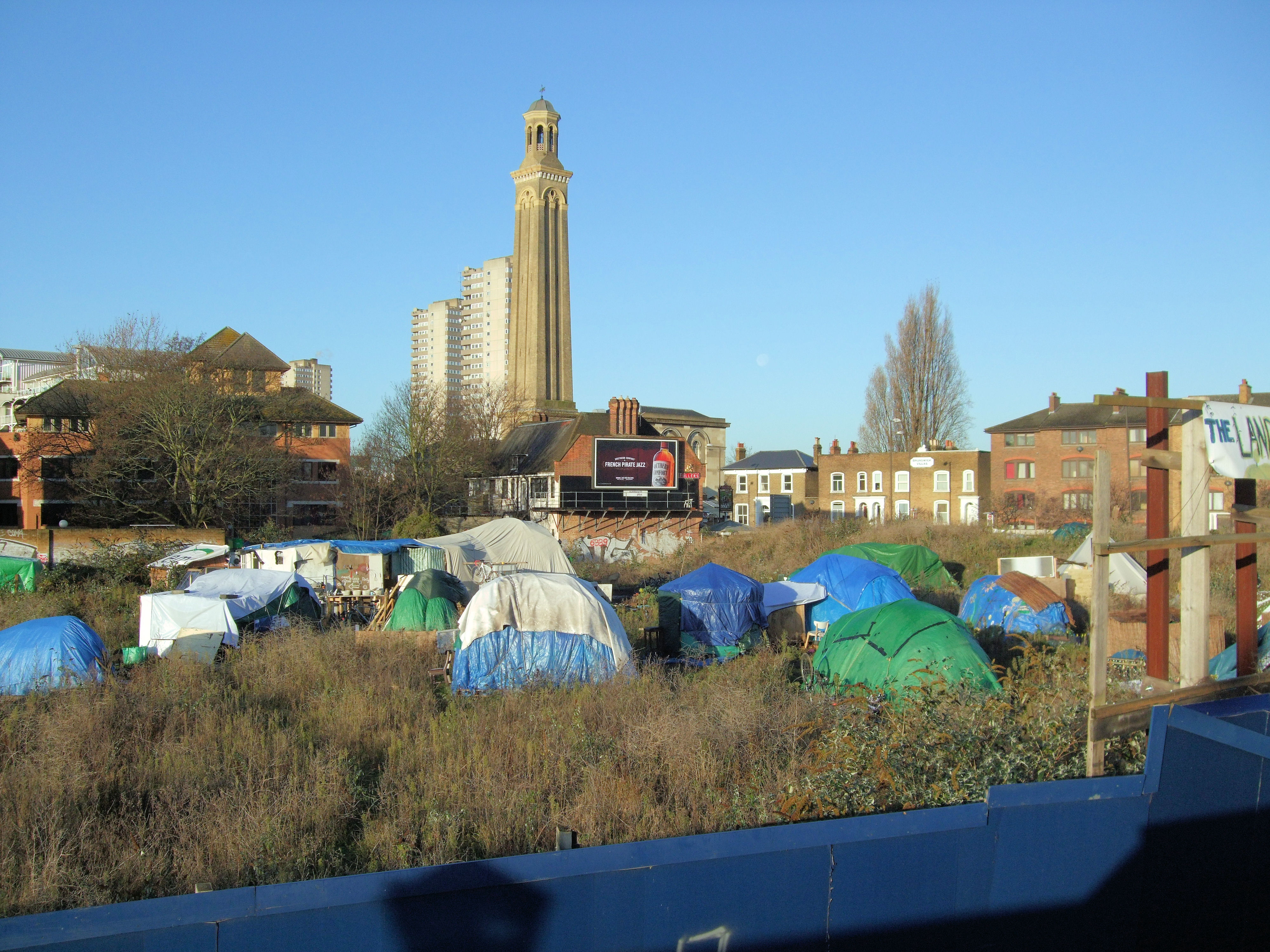
The Ecovillage in 2009

Kew Bridge Ecovillage was an ecovillage and social centre in Brentford on squatted land overlooking the River Thames at the north end of Kew Bridge in west London.

Activists inspired by the land rights campaign group The Land is Ours occupied the long derelict site on 6 June 2009. The Royal Botanic Gardens, the world's largest collection of living plants and a pioneer of horticultural preservation, faced the ecovillage site on the opposite side of the river. The community was reported as saying it wished to demonstrate the practicality of permaculture principles, living in simple bender structures, growing its own vegetables and recycling its waste. On 27 May 2010 police evicted the ecovillage inhabitants.

== The site ==
The approximately one-acre brownfield site, formerly occupied by the Scottish Widows insurance company, was reported to have been vacant for more than 20 years. The property development company St George were given planning permission by Hounslow Council for 164 flats, a business centre, a gym and a pub. St George PLC were granted a possession order for the land in Brentford County Court on 7 May 2010.

== The residents ==
In December 2009 the ecovillage had 32 permanent residents. Structures included a shower, compost toilet, and kitchen, mostly bender tents made from tree branches and recycled materials. Consensus decision making was the basis for community organisation, informed by an intention to live a more simple and eco-friendly existence. Food supply was augmented by regular trips to local grocery bins and skips, some residents describing themselves as freegans. The community included some previously homeless people; others left houses and jobs in order to apply on a daily basis principles of anti-consumerism.

After the village was disbanded, some of its residents joined the Hounslow Community Land Project, which squatted a derelict piece of land for six months in 2010, and Parliament Square's Democracy Village, set up in May 2010.

== Community events ==
The ecovillage conducted a programme of events that have included arts and crafts workshops, film shows, yoga and face-painting classes, pagan festivals, live poetry and music. It also commenced an annual seed swap. Kew Gardens itself (see above) houses one of the world's largest seedbanks.

== Documentary film ==
Documentary filmmaker Dean Puckett, a resident of the Kew Bridge Ecovillage from its inception, documented the daily lives of its inhabitants of the village as it evolved over the year of its life. The film, Grasp the Nettle, was released in 2013 after showing at documentary festivals around the world such as DOK Leipzig and London's Open City Docs Fest. In 2014 Puckett put the film up online for free viewing on his Vimeo page.

== See also ==
- Guerrilla gardening
- Diggers
- Squatting
- Umoja Village
- Take Back the Land
- Hounslow community land project
