= Villa Road =

Street in Lambeth, London

Coordinates: 51.4673°N 0.1113°W

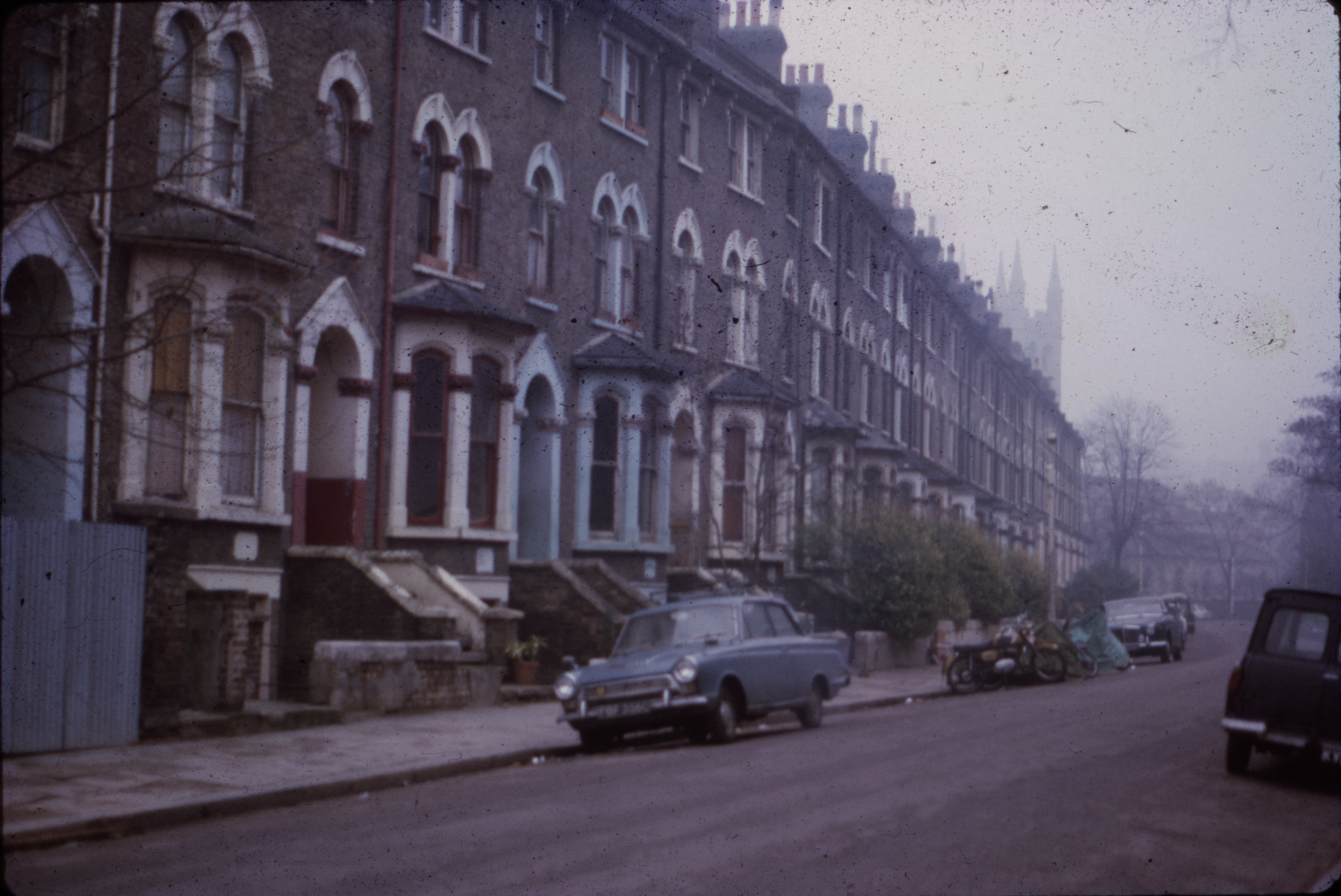
Villa Road in 1975

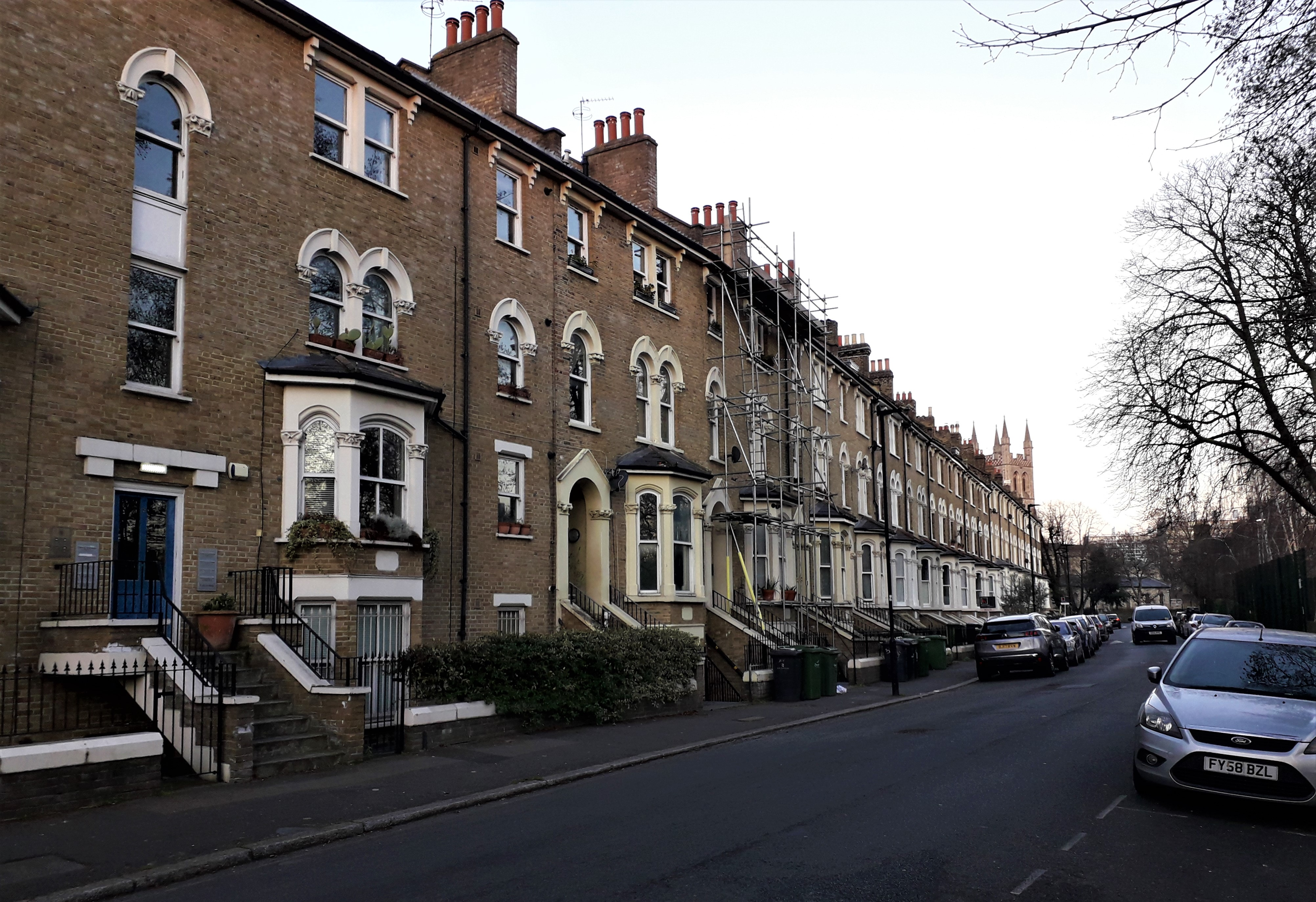
Villa Road in 2023

Villa Road is a street in Angell Town in the Borough of Lambeth, south London. Rows of terraced houses, built on both sides of the street in the Victorian era, were scheduled to be demolished in the late 1960s as part of a development plan. From 1973 onwards, houses were squatted and an alternative community was established, containing anarchists, British Black Panthers, feminists, Marxists, primal screamers and single mothers. Lambeth Council applied for possession orders for most of the buildings on the street in June 1976 and the squatters built barricades to resist eviction. After prolonged negotiations the council decided to legalise the occupation in 1978, but only after demolishing the southern side of the street. In 2006, the former squatters were profiled in the documentary film "Property is Theft" as part of the BBC series Lefties.

== History ==
In the Victorian era, terraced houses were built on both sides of Villa Road in Angell Town, in the Borough of Lambeth in south London. In 1967, Lambeth Council obtained a compulsory purchase order enabling them to acquire 400 houses in Angell Town, including 21 in Villa Road. New tower blocks were to be built to for the residents and, under the 1969 Brixton Plan, Brixton Road, which runs perpendicular to the west end of Villa Road, would have been converted to a six-lane highway for traffic entering and leaving London. Local people opposed the plans and community groups, such as the Villa Road Street Group, were formed.

== Squatted ==
At the beginning of 1973, the Villa Road Street Group squatted number 20. Over the next year, more houses were occupied, leading to condemnation from the council, which decided to demolish the street. At the close of 1974, 15 houses on Villa Road were squatted as well as 315 Brixton Road, where Villa and Brixton roads met. The latter was evicted in April 1975 and it was immediately demolished, alongside two other houses which had not been squatted since they were in such bad condition. The council said it had cleared the space to build a footbridge over Brixton Road to connect the park planned beside Villa Road to the new Stockwell Park Estate, but then dropped the plans, causing anger locally that the building had been destroyed for no reason. In the summer of 1975, the 100 squatters organised a street carnival; at Villa Road, there was a cafe and a food co-operative, and a regular news-sheet called The Villain was published.

Almost the entire street was squatted in opposition to the council's plans to redevelop the area, according to which 21 of the 32 houses on Villa Road would be demolished. The buildings were situated on both sides of the street and housed 200 people including anarchists, British Black Panthers, feminists, Marxists (at number 31), primal screamers (at 12) and single mothers. Musician Pete Cooper lived at number 31 and author Christian Wolmar at 27. An alternative community formed as it had at other squatted locations in London such as Huntley Street, St Agnes Place and Tolmers Square.

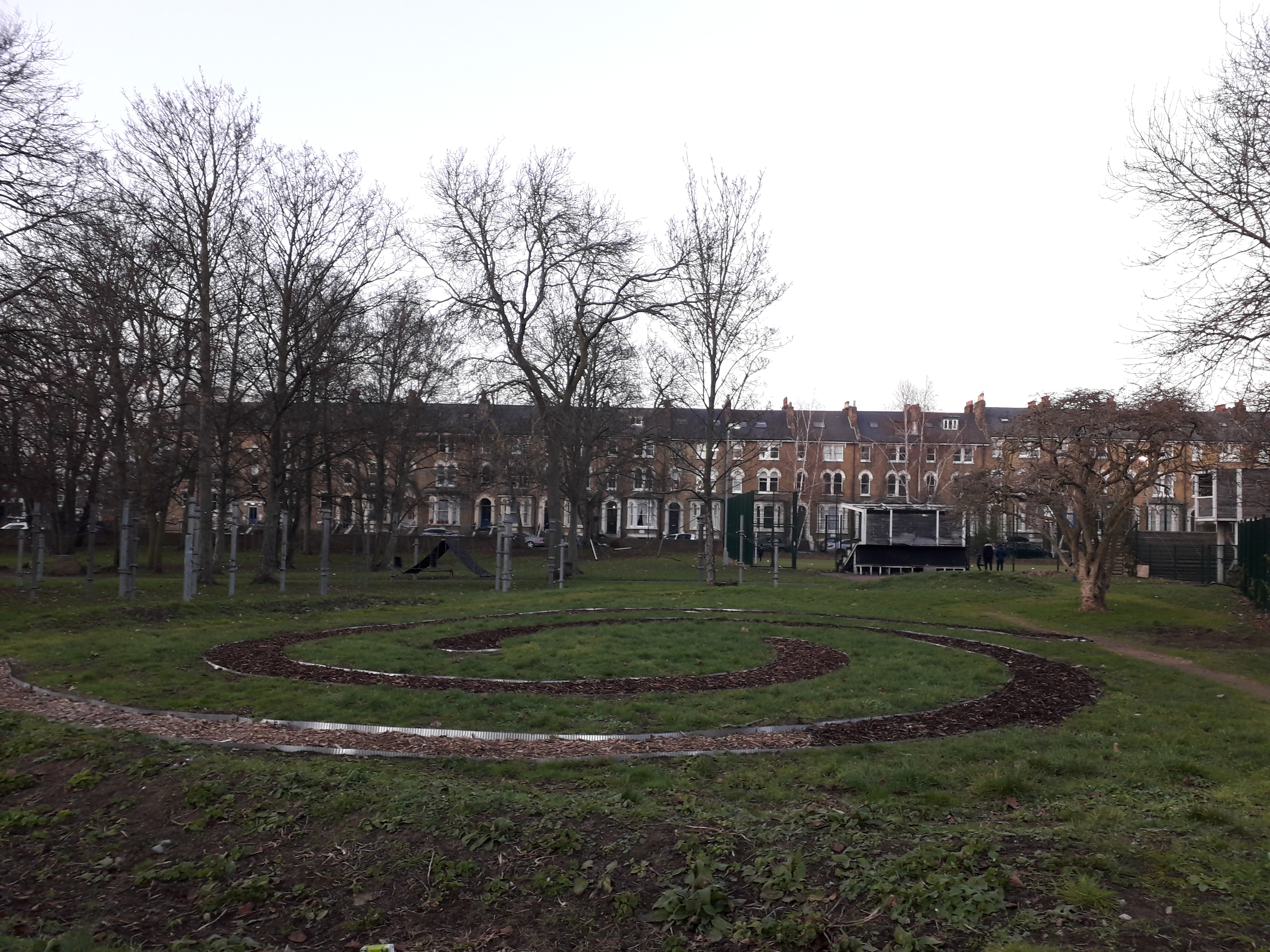
Villa Road seen from Max Roach Park in 2023

The council applied for possession orders for most of the buildings on Villa Road in June 1976 and eight out of 15 were granted. The street prepared to contest the evictions, building barricades and publicising its struggle. In October, the council suggested giving 17 of the houses to the street group; it refused, despite the difficulties created by maintaining barricades for months, since the houses were so run-down. In January 1977, the council went to the High Court, hoping to gain possession orders for the entire street. The judge suggested the two sides negotiate an agreement and set the eviction date for June 1977 in three months' time.

The council decided to legalize the occupation in 1978, but only after demolishing the southern side of the street. The barricades were taken down in March 1978 and many occupants of the remaining buildings formed a housing association called Solon, which renovated 20 houses with the council remaining as the owner. A park was constructed where the southern side of Villa Road had been; at first called Angell Park, it was renamed Max Roach Park in 1986 after a visit by the American jazz drummer. In the 2010s, Lambeth Council decided to sell off all of its housing stock and by 2017 there were no homes rented to Solon on Villa Road.

== In popular culture ==
Documentary film-maker Vanessa Engle made "Property is Theft" as part of the BBC series Lefties in 2006. She interviewed former inhabitants of the squats such as Cooper and activist Piers Corbyn. In the 1980 gangster film The Long Good Friday, three criminals go to 33 Villa Road to accost a grass.
