= Hounslow Community Land Project =

Evicted self-organised land squat in Greater London, England

Coordinates: 51°27′52.02″N 0°21′57.84″W

Sign by the front gate on Hanworth road, May 2010

Hounslow Community Land Project was a community garden and sports area on a derelict piece of land on Hanworth Road, Hounslow, western Greater London. The site, owned by Transport for London, was occupied by a group of land rights activists who set up a camp and created a football pitch, badminton court, wildlife pond and vegetable growing areas.

Transport for London, who owned the derelict land which was formerly a dye-works and a pub, had intended to build a new bus depot there. With strong public opposition, their plans were dropped in 2009, leaving the land derelict. TfL announced plans to sell the land for other development.

Squatters moved in to form the Hounslow Community Land Project in May 2010. In December that year the project was abandoned and the group moved off of the site, citing "continuing antisocial behaviour".

== See also ==
- Guerrilla Gardening
- Diggers
- Squatting
- Kew Bridge Ecovillage
