= Steve Platt =

British journalist (born 1954)

Steve Platt (born 1954) is a British journalist who was editor of New Statesman and Society magazine 1991–1996.

Platt studied geography at the London School of Economics, edited Shelter's housing magazine Roof, and was an activist in the squatting movement. In the 1980s he and two others ran a short life housing organisation, Islington Community Housing, in north-east London.

The fortnightly Statesman column by John Pilger began in 1991, while Platt was editor, after the two men had worked together on media campaigns against the First Gulf war. Platt, "while not securing a spectacular turnaround in the merged New Statesman & Society's fortunes... made it once again readable". Platt was described as "a propagandist, using New Statesman & Society as a platform for various campaigns against executive abuse of state power", and was credited for bringing stability to it, despite a costly libel action brought by then-Prime Minister John Major in 1993. Platt subsequently worked for Channel 4 Television, for whom he produced various publications and websites. Among other things, from 1998 to 2010 he edited the Time Team website, which won a Bafta for interactive entertainment (factual) in 2002. He later wrote for Red Pepper magazine.

Media offices
Preceded by Stuart Weir	Editor of New Statesman and Society; 1991–1996	Succeeded by Ian Hargreaves as editor of New Statesman
