= Camelot Property Management =

Dutch vacant property management firm

Camelot Property Management Ltd.
- Company type: Private Limited Company
- Industry: Property, Security
- Founded: 1993
- Number of locations: 12 (Belgium, France, Germany, Republic of Ireland, Netherlands and United Kingdom)
- Key people: Joost van Gestel, CEO
- Number of employees: 200

Camelot Property Management Ltd. (Dutch: Camelot Beheer BV) is a vacant property management firm started in the Netherlands in 1993. Camelot manages commercial and residential properties on behalf of landlords and property developers by assigning people to occupy vacant buildings to deter squatters.

== Overview ==
They are notable for having taken most of their UK subsidiary companies into voluntary liquidation several times, the most recent being November 2019 after Camelot Guardian Management Ltd were successfully prosecuted for failure to licence a house in multiple occupation (HMO) and 14 breaches of HMO management regulations.

Occupiers pay a deposit and a weekly management fee, often a half of the private rental sector equivalent for similar properties in the same area, and in return they help keep the property secure through being occupied.

The occupiers do not have the same tenancy rights for six months notice and have fewer rights than squatters.

Other companies offering similar property guardian services include Live-In Guardians, Dex Property Management, VPS Guardians and Ad-Hoc Property Management. These companies have been taken to court over several different breaches such as health and safety of their guardians, some for illegally renting out properties without the owners consent.

Camelot also provide squat eviction services and security guards. The company successfully lobbied the French government to introduce anti-squatting legislation.

In 2016, the former headquarters of Camelot in Shoreditch, east London, were occupied by squatters.
