= Iron Rail Book Collective =

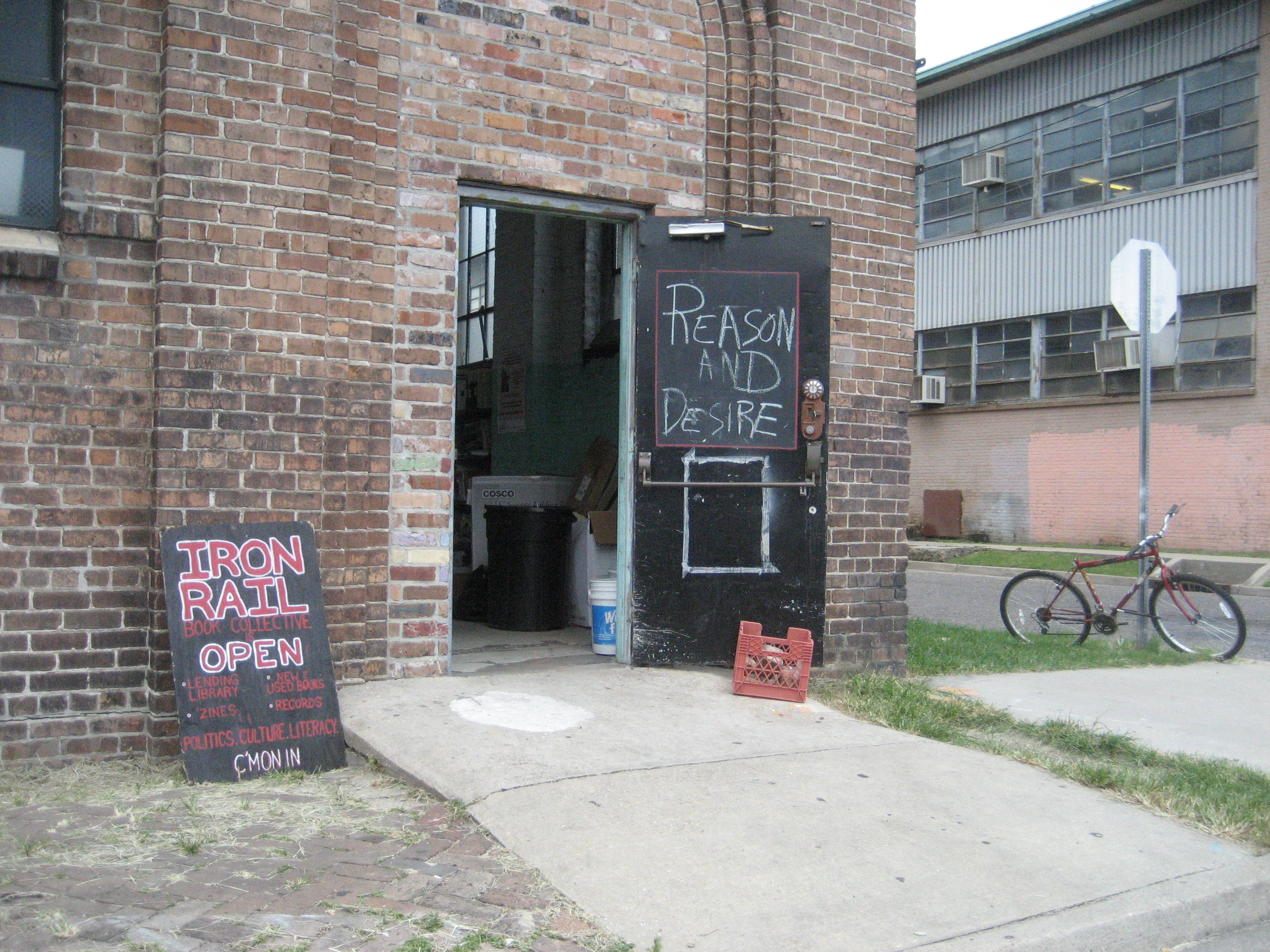
Entrance to the former location of the Iron Rail Book Collective at 530 Marigny St., July 2008

The Iron Rail Book Collective is a volunteer-run radical library and anarchist bookstore in New Orleans, Louisiana. The infoshop's main focus is a lending library featuring a wide selection of books on topics including anarchism and socialism, fiction, gardening and philosophy. The Iron Rail has also sold records, zines, local CDs and some miscellany. Events held at the Iron Rail have included workshops and art presentations. The Iron Rail also contains the Above Ground Zine Library with a selection of thousands of zines, some very rare. An Instagram account, @ironrailarchive, currently posts information about its activities.

== Locations ==
The original address of Iron Rail was 511 Marigny Street from 2003 until 2011, in a building known as 'The Ark'. The entire building was evicted by the New Orleans Police Department in March 2011. This forced the temporary closure of Iron Rail and also the Plan-B New Orleans Community Bike Project and Hasbin Wilby’s Recycled Art Supplies. In a statement the collective said that "alleged code and permit violations" were the reasons for the immediate closure. Iron Rail argued that their affairs were in order and because they were a non-profit organisation the permits being requested were not needed.

The collective then moved to 503 Barracks Street until February 2014. After this time, pop-up versions of the bookstore occasionally appeared in various venues in New Orleans. As of April 2026, the Iron Rail is located within the cultural and music venue CANOA (Caribbean And New Orleanian Arts) at 4210 St. Claude Avenue in the Bywater neighborhood.

== Bookstore ==
The Iron Rail has featured a section of political and underground books for sale. Categories included feminism, anarchism, ecology and primitivism, prisons and police, Native American studies, labor struggles, globalization, capitalist exploitation and subcultures. There was also a selection of cheap used fiction.

The Above Ground Zine Library found a home at the Iron Rail after Hurricane Katrina destroyed the punk warehouse on Banks Street. Robb Roemershauser moved hundreds of rare zines and continued to maintain the collection at Iron Rail.

== Library ==
The library contains an extensive collection of radical books on topics including feminism, anarchism, history, race relations, ecology, labor struggles, cultural studies, protest and activism as well as a wide array of other interesting topics like philosophy, art, language, health, fiction and parenting. The library at various times has contained over 5000 titles. There were two types of library memberships, one for residents and one for non-residents. The library was the first project to reopen after Hurricane Katrina.

== The Collective ==
The Iron Rail is run by a group of anti-police volunteers working together to present a model for a non-authoritarian structure of organizing. In addition to being a library and bookstore, the Iron Rail is also a hub of radical activism in New Orleans. It regularly featured lectures, talks, discussions and presentations by various travelers, in addition to being the meeting place for many other groups. Kimya Dawson played a benefit for Iron Rail.

== See also ==
- ABC No Rio
- Boxcar Books
- Catalyst Infoshop
- Civic Media Center
- Firestorm Cafe & Books
- Internationalist Books
- Lucy Parsons Center
- Red Emma's
