= Boxcar Books =

Coordinates: 39.1674°N 86.5293°W

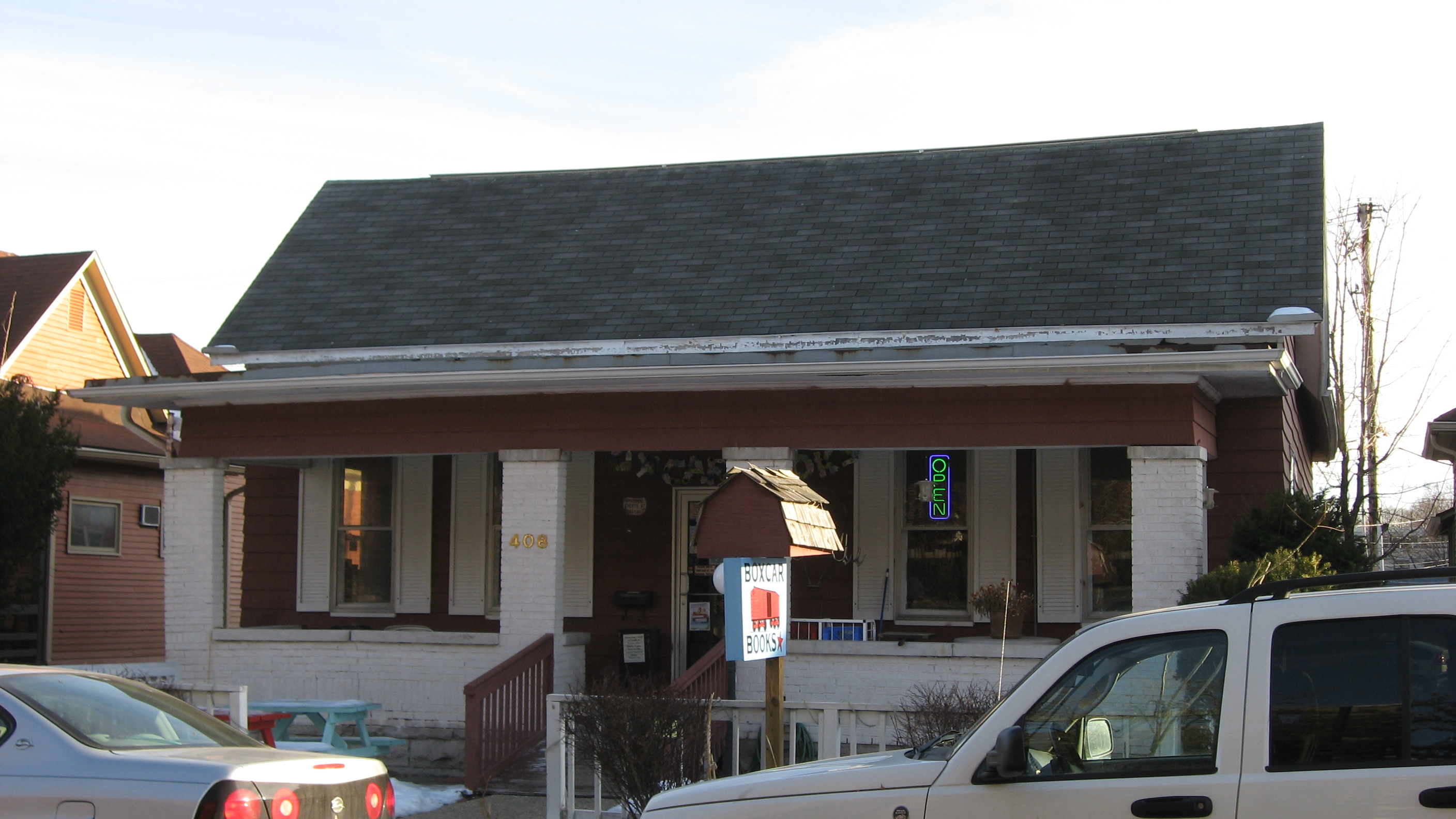
Boxcar Books in 2011

Boxcar Books was a non-profit, independent bookstore, infoshop, and community center in Bloomington, Indiana. Collectively run by volunteers, Boxcar Books was "one of the highest-volume zine sellers" in the United States. According to its website, the store existed to "promote reading, self-education, social equality, and social welfare through increased accessibility to literature and workshops." Boxcar Books was for a time also the home of the Midwest Pages to Prisoners Project, a non-profit books to prisoners organization that distributes books and reading materials to prisoners. By the end of 2017, Boxcar Books had closed their operations.

== History ==
Boxcar Books and Community Center was founded by Oliver Haimson and Matthew Turissini in 2001. The bookstore included a wide selection of new and used nonfiction books with a particular focus on gender studies and "green" lifestyles. In 2008, the bookstore moved to a location closer to Indiana University.

== Events ==
In addition to poetry readings and community events, Boxcar Books regularly used to host the Writers Guild of Bloomington "Prose Reading & Open Mic" on the first Sunday of the month and the "Bloomington Writer Project" every Tuesday afternoon. The bookstore held an annual fundraising event for itself and the Midwest Pages to Prisoners Project called the "Rock n' Roll Prom."

== Target of hate groups ==
Boxcar Books was the target of protests by a white supremacist hate group called the Traditionalist Youth Network.

== See also ==
- Feminist bookstore
- Bluestockings Books
- Iron Rail Book Collective
- Red Emma's Bookstore Coffeehouse
- In Other Words Women's Books and Resources
