= Centre International de Recherches sur l'Anarchisme =

Anarchist archive in Lausanne (Switzerland)

CIRA
- Centre International de Recherches sur l'Anarchisme
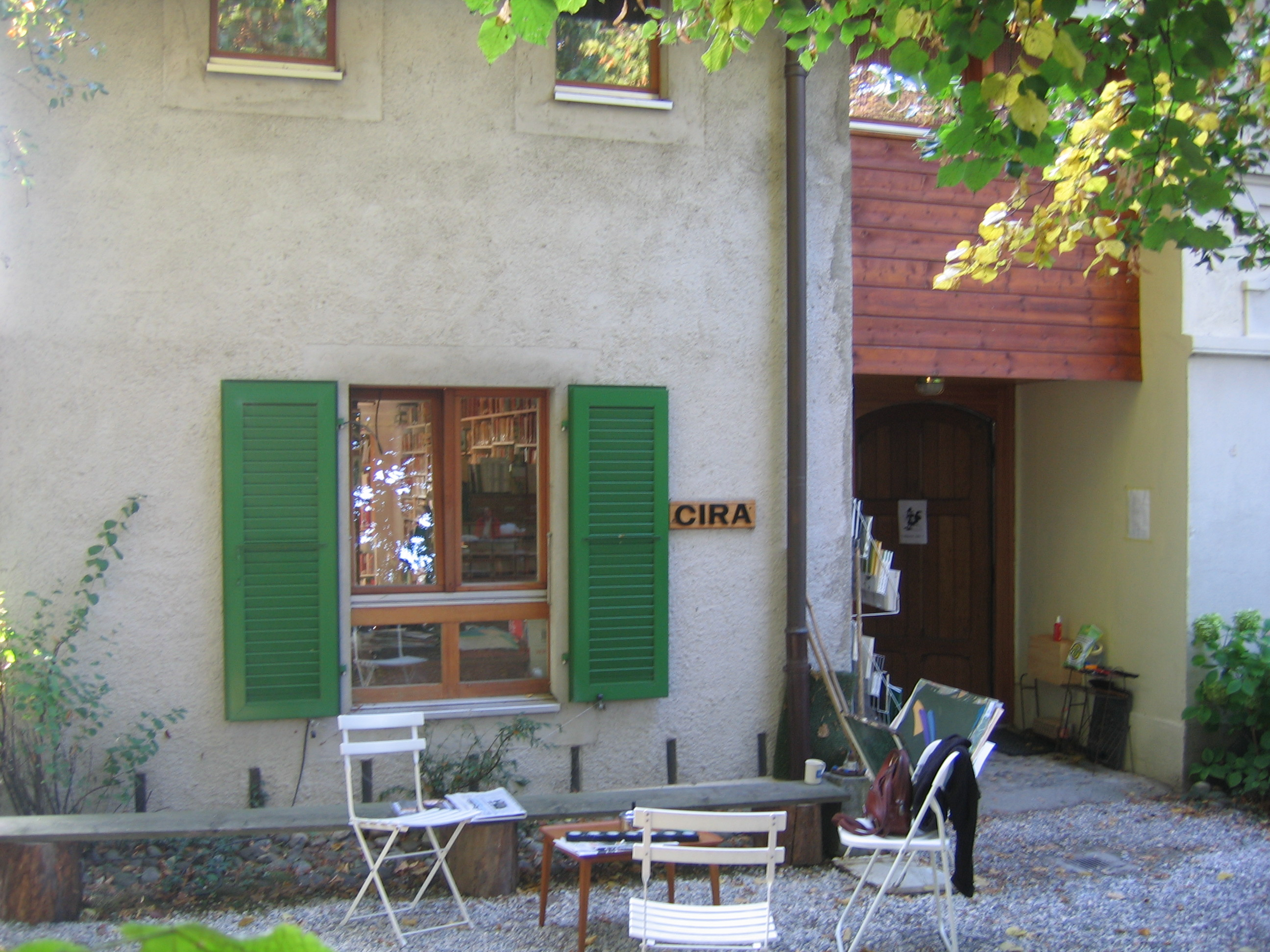
- Entrance to CIRA
- 46°31′34.66″N 6°38′43.44″E
- Location: 24 Avenue de Beaumont, Lausanne, Switzerland
- Established: 1957
- Reference to legal mandate: As of 2014, CIRA is formally registered with the Swiss Government as an association.
- Branches: Marseille, France; Fujinomiya, Japan

Collection
- Items collected: 20,000 books & pamphlets, 4,000 periodicals

Access and use
- Access requirements: Consultation within the library is free of charge, but membership is required to borrow books.

CIRA (Centre International de Recherches sur l'Anarchisme) or the International Center for Research on Anarchism is an anarchist archive, infoshop and library of anarchist material in different languages which is based in Lausanne, Switzerland and has two branches in Marseille, France and Fujinomiya, Japan.

== Early history ==
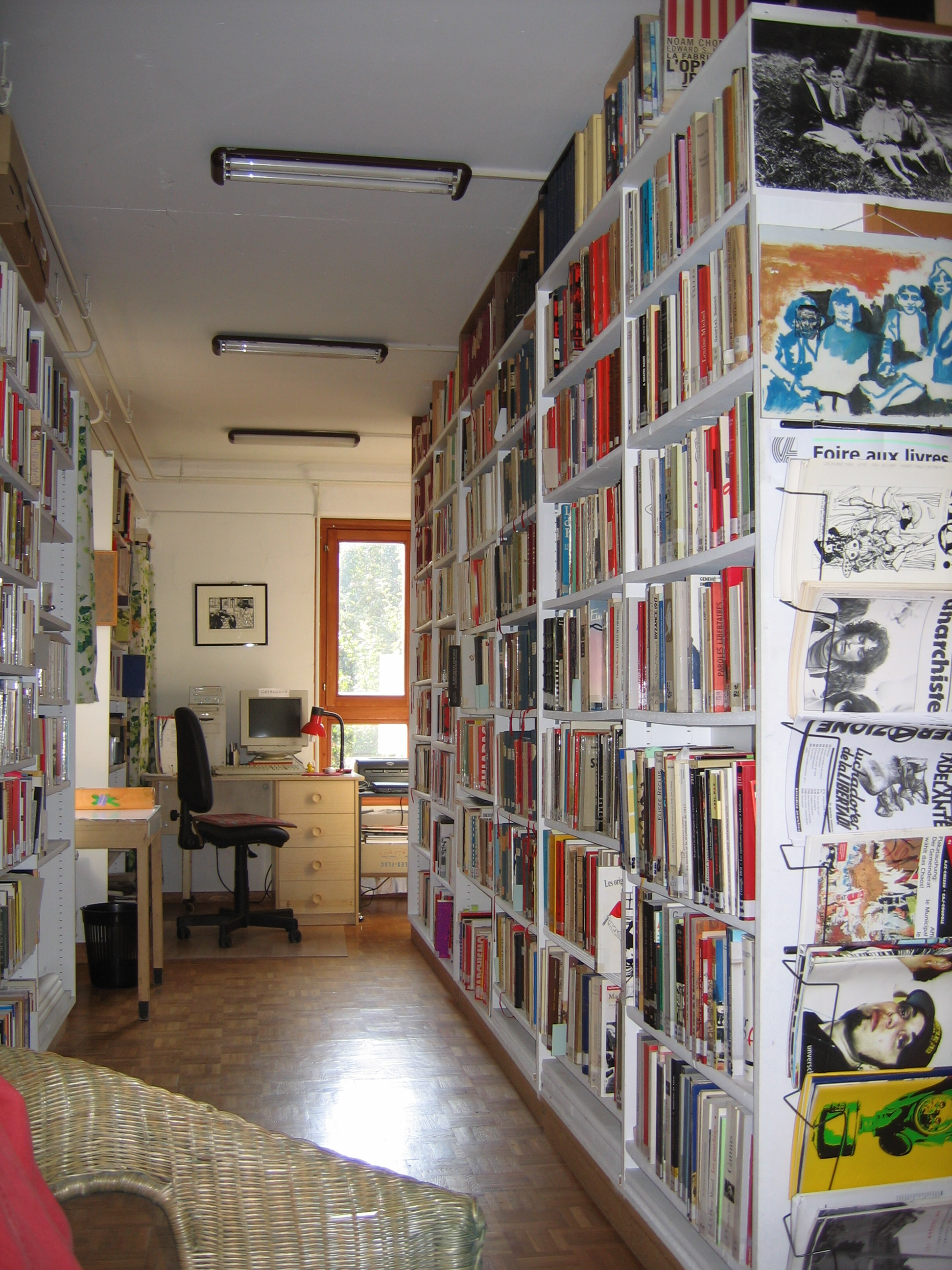
Inside of CIRA

The idea of CIRA was created during a meeting which was held in Geneva in 1956 between 'an Italian conscientious objector, a French war resister, a Bulgarian refugee and an elderly Swiss anarchist, former activist at the Ligue d'Action du Bâtiment Geneva.' CIRA was founded in the following year and for six years was run in a rented room in the city by Italian anarchist Pietro Ferrua. Ferrua was deported from Switzerland in 1963 after an anti-Francoist attack was made on the Spanish consulate in Geneva two years previously. In the following year CIRA was moved to Lausanne into a room in a family boarding house which was kept by Marie-Christine Mikhaïlo, who ran the library with her daughter Marianne Enckell. In 1975 CIRA returned to Geneva, where it stayed until 1989, after which it finally moved to its current address.

== Recent history ==
CIRA is an association which is recognised by the city council under articles 60 et seq of the Swiss Civil Code and is supervised by an international committee, while a local committee runs the centre with volunteers. Moran (2014) observed that the centre employed a worker, as well as taking people undertaking alternative civilian service instead of being conscripted for military service. Cleminson (2012) described it as follows:

'CIRA is a major research centre containing a vast range of historical and contemporary materials, mainly but not exclusively European. As well as housing an extensive anarchist library, it holds research papers, pamphlets, a substantial collection of newspapers and periodicals and provides an extremely convivial environment for research and learning. Available at www.cira.ch/.' (Cleminson 2012, p. 366).

There are branches of CIRA in Marseille (Note: Cleminson (2012) documented: 'Centre International de Recherches sur l’Anarchisme (CIRA), Marseille, France. This gives access not only to Felip Equy’s annually updated "anarchist bibliographies", but also to an archive of the Centre’s Bulletins. The latter has often carried historical or biographical studies, and information on current research. Available at http://cira.marseille.free.fr/.' (Cleminson 2012, p. 366).) and Fujinomiya. CIRA Nippon was set up in 1970 in Fujinomiya, and as of 2011, the archive contained 2000 books.

In 1978, CIRA set up the Federazione Internazionale dei centri studi e di documentazione libertari (FICEDL), which aimed to be a group bringing together different anarchist archives worldwide. CIRA celebrated its fiftieth birthday in 2007 with a gathering in Lausanne. Similar historical archives include La Contemporaine (Nanterre, France) and the:

- Arbejderbevægelsens Informations Central (AIC) (Copenhagen, Denmark)
- Archivio Biblioteca Enrico Travaglini (Fano, Italy)
- Historische Kommission (Berlin)
- International Institute of Social History (IISG) (Amsterdam, The Netherlands)
- Schweizerisches Sozialarchiv (Zurich).

In 2020 the Lausanne library held 20,000 books and pamphlets and 4,000 periodicals (100 of which were active).

== Publications ==
CIRA has published a yearly bulletin since 1959, which is available to subscribers and is also online. (Note: The Spring 2025 issue of the Bulletin is here.) The bulletin contains articles in French, Spanish, Italian and English, along with listings of their acquisitions for the year, and information about research, libraries and conferences. The edited collection Refuser de parvenir (The refusal to make a career) was published by the CIRA collective in 2016 following discussions held at CIRA in 2013 and 2014.

== See also ==
- Anarchism in Switzerland
- Anarchy Archives
- Kate Sharpley Library
- The International Federation of Anarchist Documentation and Study Centres (Ficedl)
