= Lucy Parsons Center =

Radical bookstore and community space in Boston, US

Coordinates: 42.345287°N 71.079977°W

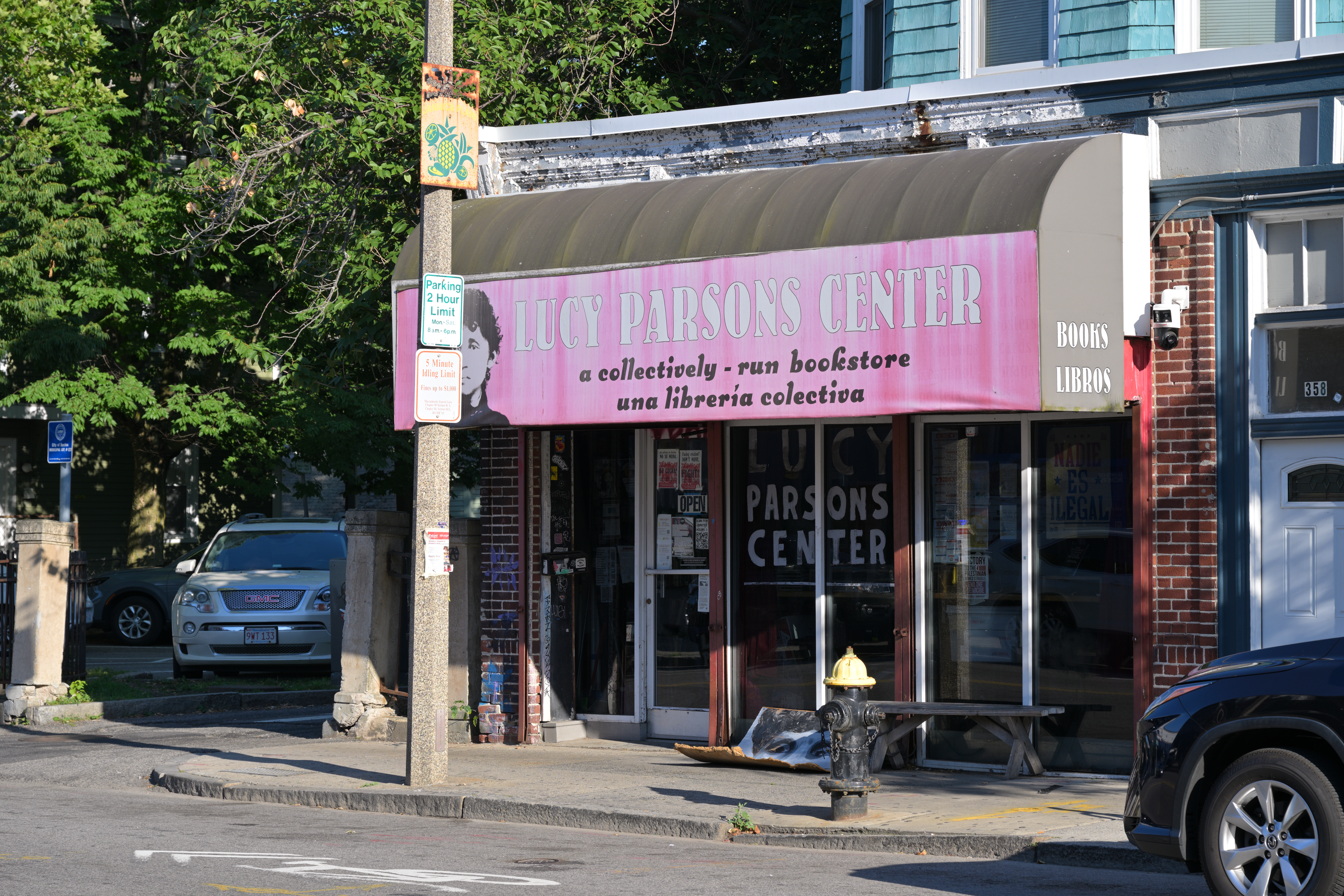
The Lucy Parsons Center in its present location in Jamaica Plain

The Lucy Parsons Center, located in Jamaica Plain, Boston, Massachusetts, is a radical, nonprofit independent bookstore and self-managed social center. Formed out of the Red Word bookstore, it is collectively run by volunteers. The center provides reading material, space for individuals to drop in, and a free space for meetings and events.

== History ==
The Red Book Store (now the Lucy Parsons Center) began in 1969 in a small one-room basement shop in Central Square, Cambridge. It moved two or three times in the first couple of years, before settling into what would be its home until 1983 in a large space on the corner of River and Pleasant streets in Cambridge. In 1983 the project moved to Jamaica Plain, Boston. It stayed there until May 1994, returning to Central Square, where it stayed four years until it was evicted so the building could be demolished. In May 1998 it moved into a temporary space in Davis Square, Somerville. Davis Square was a temporary location and with sales suffering, the center was flooded and had to make an appeal for support. In 1999, the project moved to the South End of Boston and finally moved back to Jamaica Plain in 2011.

The center's namesake, Lucy Parsons, was a radical labor organizer and anarchocommunist in Chicago from the 1880s onwards. She is remembered as a powerful orator. It was a reformulation of the Red Book Store, which was set up in Cambridge, Massachusetts in 1969. One of the original founders was professor and activist George Katsiaficas. Initially Maoist, the bookshop was run by an anarchist collective until the late 2010s and is currently operated by a multi-tendency revolutionary collective.

By the mid 1990s, the center was part of an established network of North American infoshops which included Long Haul in Berkeley, A-Space in Philadelphia and Who's Emma in Toronto.

== Activities ==
When it was rebirthed in 1992, the center became a nonprofit organization with a 501(c)(3) tax-exempt status. The volunteer-run bookshop sells books, pamphlets and zines. One of the most popular books is A People's History of the United States by Howard Zinn. Apart from the bookstore, the Lucy Parsons Center serves as a space for community organizers to use for meetings and special events. It also hosts a weekly movie night.

The center also helps provide free books to prisoners through the Prison Book Program.

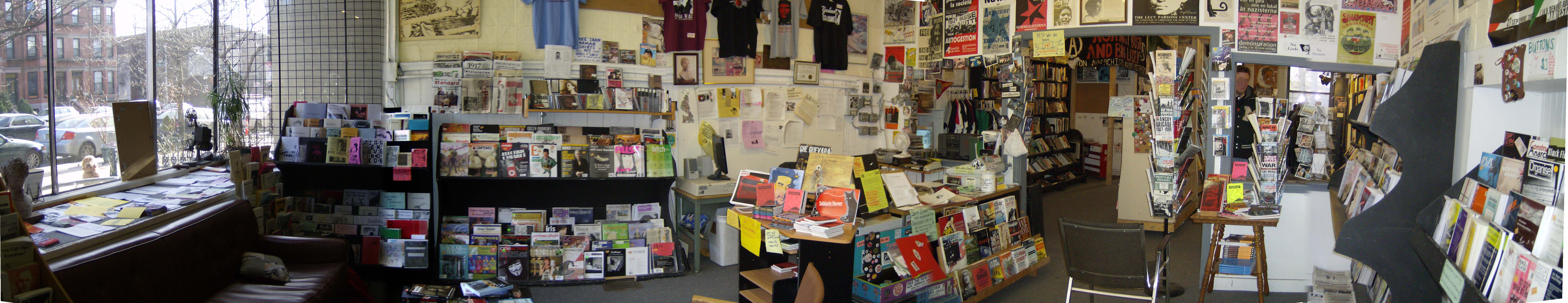
Inside the Lucy Parsons Center's previous location in Back Bay

== See also ==
- Bluestockings
- Firestorm Books & Coffee
- Red Emma's
