= Iron rail =

Iron rail can refer to:

- Early wagonway rails made of cast or wrought iron, see Iron rails (wagonways)
- Iron or steel railway rails see Rail (railway)
- Iron Rail Book Collective, a radical library in New Orleans, USA
