= Marianne Enckell =

Archivist of anarchism (born 1944)

- Born: October 22, 1944 (age 81); Stockholm, Sweden
- Education: University of Geneva, Switzerland
- Occupations: Archivist; Author; Director; Editor; Historian; Translator
- Parents: Ralph Enckell (father); Marie-Christine Mikhailo (mother)

Marianne Enckell was born in 1944 to Marie-Christine Mikhailo, who ran the Centre International de Recherches sur l'Anarchisme, and Ralph Enckell, a Finnish diplomat. She is an historian, an archivist of anarchism and the director of the anarchist research center Centre International de Recherches sur l'Anarchisme (CIRA) in Lausanne, Switzerland. She has worked in trade unions and as a translator.

== Early life ==
Enckell was born in 1944 to Marie-Christine Mikhaïlo. (Note: Subsequent information about Mikhaïlo has been extracted from Obituary: Marie-Christine Mikhaïlo (1916-2004) by Ismaël and Cédric.) Her mother was born in 1916 in a former Russian Grand Duchy (currently Finland), but spent her adolescence in Beaumont, a suburb of Lausanne in Switzerland near Lausanne University. Mikhaïlo returned to Finland during the First World War, where she married Ralph Enckell, a Finnish diplomat, with whom she had five children. By 1948 Mikhaïlo was divorced. She returned to Beamont and opened a student-guest-house. In 1964 the Centre International de Recherches sur l'Anarchisme moved from Geneva after the deportation in the previous year of its librarian, Pietro Ferrua, after which Mikhaïlo ran it with the help of her daughter. (Note: Obituary: Marie-Christine Mikhaïlo (1916-2004) by Ismaël and Cédric. stated that Mikhaïlo discovered anarchism in 1954 'thanks to an Italian conscientious objector who had fled to Switzerland - Pietro Ferrua.' According to another source, Ferrua was deported from Switzerland in 1963.)

== Later life ==
Enckell obtained a bachelor's degree, which she followed by studying sociology at the University of Geneva. After leaving university she provided support for conscientious objectors and the May 68 movement, and, from 1971 to 1977, to the Womens Liberation Movement (MLF). From 1977 to 1984 she was employed by the Geneva-based International Union of Food Workers and Allied Industries (now the International Union of Food, Agricultural, Hotel, Restaurant, Catering, Tobacco and Allied Workers' Associations). Later, from 1991 to 1994, she worked for the Swiss Workers' Assistance Society (OSEW) (now solidar suisse) in Lausanne.

Enckell subsequently became the director of the Centre International de Recherches sur l'Anarchisme. She has organized several international anarchist colloquiums, including the 1984 one in Venice, about which she co-authored a compendium of texts and photographs. Graham (2025) commented: 'The Venice gathering was an impressive affair, attended by 3,000 anarchists from all over the world, including such luminaries as Murray Bookchin, Colin Ward, Marianne Enckell, Ruben Prieto, Tomàs Ibañez ....' In 2023 the book Thinking as anarchists: Selected writings from Volontà (edited by Giovanna Gioli and Hamish Kallin) was published which includes essays that were originally presented at the 1984 colloquium. A fortieth anniversary of the colloquium was held in Venice in 2024. (Note: See An introduction to the events for the 40th anniversary of "Venice '84" and 84/24 - The radical Venice and its places. Details of the tour.)

Enckell has written numerous articles published by the anarchist press. She has worked as a translator. And she has served on several editorial boards.

== Publications ==
- 1992. "The Gardens of Cocagne". The Raven. 5 (1): 21–29. ISSN 0951-4066.
- 2002. With Amedeo Bertolo. Farewell to Fabulations! A brief dossier to clarify its origin and its sense.
- 2009. "The school and the barricade" (PDF). lib.anarhija.net. Library.Anarhija.Net. 2009.
- 2012. 'Introduction' in 'Shreve, Michael, ed. (2012). Outrage An anarchist memoir of the penal colony by Clément Duvel. Oakland, CA: PM Press. ISBN 978-1-60486-500-4.'
- 2018. 'Bakunin and the Jura Federation' in 'Enckell, Marianne (2018). Bensimon, Fabrice; Deluermoz, Quentin; Moisand, Jeanne (eds.). Arise Ye Wretched of the Earth": The First International in a Global Perspective. Brill.'
- 2021. "Pietro Ferrua (1930-2021)". KSL: Bulletin of the Kate Sharpley Library. 103 (September). 2021.
- 2024. "Ronald Creagh, an appreciation Anarchist Studies". Anarchist Studies. 32 (1): 5-7. 2024.

== See also ==
- The forgotten history of the libertarian Left F.C. Bakunin The libertarian movement has been part of Swiss history for 150 years. Marianne Enckell, archivist at the International Centre for Research on Anarchism in Lausanne, tells swissinfo.ch about the cradle of anarchy.
