= Jura Books =

Australian anarchist bookshop and infoshop

Coordinates: 33°53′16.59″S 151°9′34.59″E

Jura Books is an anarchist bookshop and infoshop located in Sydney, Australia. It was founded in 1977.

== History ==
The shop was named after the Jura federation, the federation of workers of the Jura region that associated with Mikhail Bakunin in the First International. It has operated since August 1977, first on King Street, Newtown, before moving to Parramatta Road, Petersham. One of its members was Jack the Anarchist, who joined it quickly after its inception.

Anarchist Resources Incorporated, a non-profit collective, manages the bookshop building, which also includes meeting space and an inherited library collection, The Fanya Baron Library, that was named in honour of Lithuanian-born anarchist Fanya Baron.

Australian Ethical Investment uses Jura Books as an example of socially responsible investing practice, stating that Jura is "a major source in Australia for a wide range of affordable books of community and educational interest including the areas of trade unionism, women's rights, environment, permaculture, indigenous peoples' issues, poetry, arts and non-violent revolution."

Over the many years of operation Jura has built a collection of more than 4,500 Australian and international posters, believed to be one of the biggest and most complete collections of political posters known to exist in Australia. In 2003 a selection of over 100 political posters spanning from the 1960s to the late 1980s were on display at Jura Books.

Jura Books is also used for community meetings and talks. Members of the collective have been involved in organising several successful conferences in Sydney including on Workers Control, 1984 and Social Control, and the 1995 Visions of Freedom conference, with guest speaker Noam Chomsky.

For many years (1982 to 2013) the anarcho-syndicalist paper Rebel Worker was published from the Jura Books premises. It is now published elsewhere.

== See also ==
- Freedom Shop

== Bibliography ==
- Sidari, Danilo; Parissi, Sid; Sheldon, Peter (Fall 2016), Jack Grancharoff (June 7, 1925-May 5, 2016), Anarcho-Syndicalist Review
