= Spunk Library =

Defunct anarchist internet archive (1992–2002)

- Website type: Archive
- Owner: Spunk Collective
- Creators: Ian Heavens, Chuck Munson
- Website: http://www.spunk.org/
- Launched: 1992

The Spunk Library (also known as Spunk Press) was an anarchist Internet archive. The name "spunk" was chosen for the term's meaning in Swedish ("anything we want it to mean"), American English ("courage or spirit"), and Australian ("an attractive person"), summarized by the website as "nondescript, energetic, courageous and attractive".

== History ==
According to anarchist librarian Chuck Munson, the library was begun as Spunk Press in 1992. The founding contributors – Ian Heavens, Jack Jansen, Andrew Flood, Iain McKay and Practical Anarchy editors Munson and Mikael Cardell – originally met via an online forum, namely Jansen's Anarchy Discussion email list. The Library was run by an editorial collective during the 1990s. It was not intended to replace print publishing, but rather served a shop window promoting anarchist book publishers, newspapers and journals.

By 1995, it was already the largest anarchist archive of published material catalogued on computer networks, though it faced a media assault accusing it of collaborating with terrorists such as the Red Army Faction, of providing instructions for bomb-making and of coordinating the "disruption of schools, looting of shops and attacks on multinational firms." The Library remained largely inactive during the first decade of the 2000s, with the home page last being updated in March 2002.

The Rough Guide to the Internet described the Library as being "organized neatly and with reassuring authority". Chris Atton, writing in Alternative Media (2002) hailed the site as an "advertisement for socially responsible anarchism with a significant intellectual pedigree", remarking that "[i]n a world where anarchism is still largely derided or maligned by the mass media, that is an important function" and drawing a comparison to Infoshop.org.

== See also ==
- Alternative Media Project
- Libcom.org, an online space that acts in part as a library and archive predominantly in english.
- Anarchy Archives, an online research center on the history and theory of anarchism founded in 1995
- List of anarchist periodicals
