= Bluestockings (bookstore) =

Defunct collectively owned bookstore, café, and activist center (1999–2025)

Coordinates: 40°43′17.1″N 73°59′20.28″W

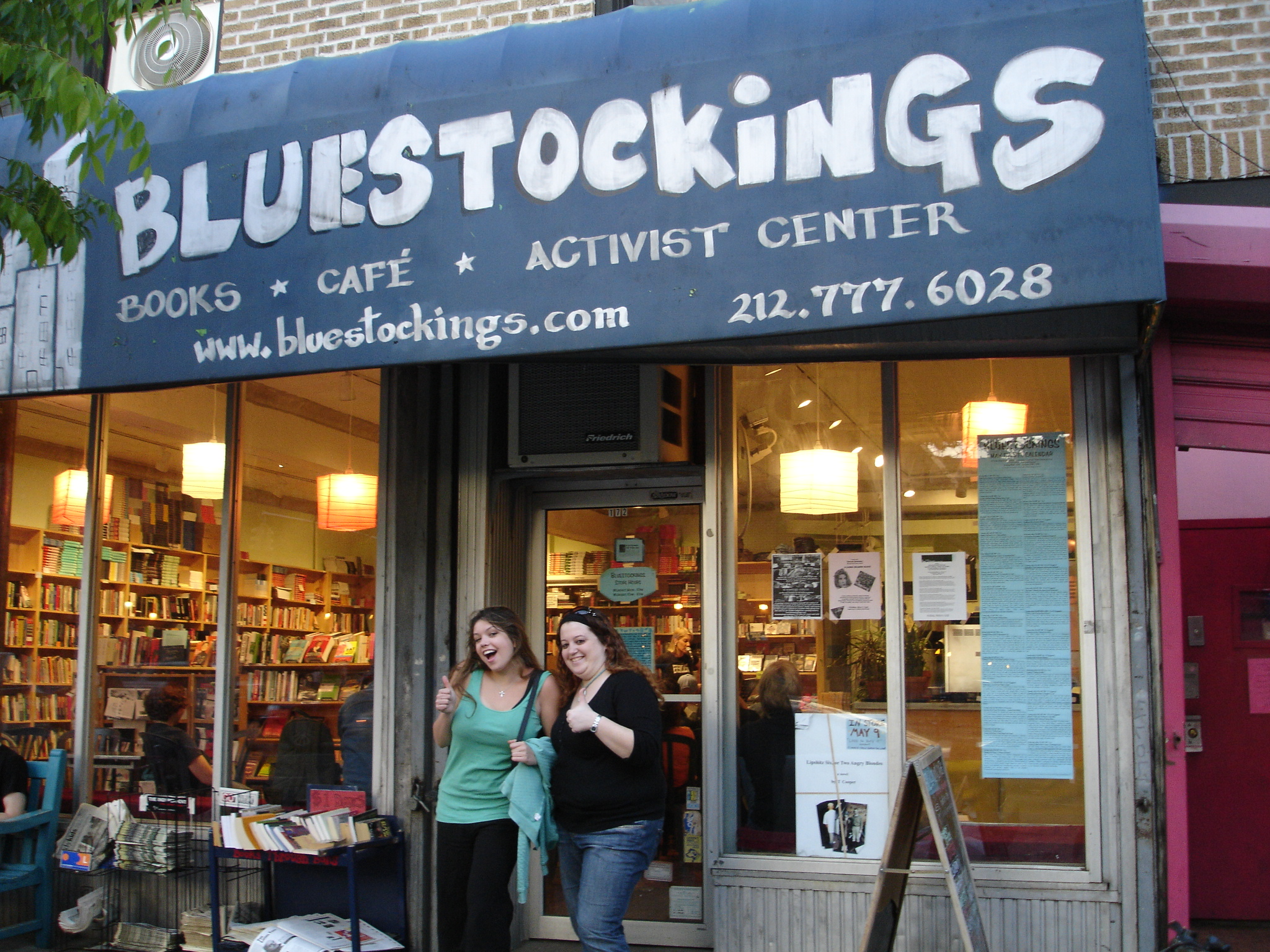
- 172 Allen Street storefront
- Formation: 1999; 27 years ago
- Founder: Kathryn Welsh
- Dissolved: September 2025
- Type: Bookstore worker cooperative
- Location: 116 Suffolk Street, Lower East Side, New York City, United States
- Region served: New York metropolitan area
- Website: www.bluestockings.com

Bluestockings was a radical bookstore, café, and activist center located on the Lower East Side of Manhattan, New York City, operating from 1999 to 2025. It started as a volunteer-supported and collectively owned bookstore, and later became a worker-owned bookstore that also operated mutual-aid offerings/a free store. The store started in 1999 as a feminist bookstore and was named for a group of Enlightenment intellectual women, the Bluestockings.

== Influences ==
Bluestockings actively supported "movements that challenge hierarchy and all systems of oppression" and was one of 13 identified feminist bookstores in the United States and Canada. Ideologically, Bluestockings was influenced by intersectional feminism, anti-capitalism, and the anti-globalization movement of the early 2000s, and conceptually, by other collectively run spaces and infoshops like Time's Up! Its collective members saw Bluestockings as an experiment in self-managed autonomous space that challenged the neoliberal economic organization of New York City, creating a community for queer or femme activists. Inspired by feminist consciousness-raising reading groups, Bluestockings provided information on social oppression through its books, zines, and events.

== Structure ==
Bluestockings was a collectively owned independent bookstore that contained a small fair trade café serving coffee from Zapatista coffee cooperatives. The Bluestockings collective was a small group of worker-owners. They made decisions based on consensus, with the input and support of volunteers and community members. As of 2017, the store was registered as an S corporation in which no one person can own a majority of shares. Volunteers contributed through self-directed projects and working groups. At its peak, Bluestockings had over 70 active volunteers.

Bluestockings served as a community meeting space for literary, activist, feminist, and intellectual gatherings. In this public space, guests could relax and socialize as long as they wanted without purchasing anything. Most nights, Bluestockings hosted author readings, discussions, screenings, workshops, open mics, and panels, all of which were free to attend. Some notable speakers included members of the band Pussy Riot, poet Eileen Myles, Transgender Vanguard, and the Icarus Project.

== History ==
Bluestockings opened in 1999 as a feminist bookstore. Founder Kathryn Welsh cited a lack of women's bookstores in New York among her reasons for founding Bluestockings. She started the store with the help of an anonymous investment of $50,000, and at the start, only women could be members of the collective. At the end of 2002, Bluestockings' revenue was negatively affected by the desertion of New York City's downtown following the September 11 attacks. This caused the store to incur debt, and its informal collective broke up.

Welsh put the bookstore up for sale in February 2003, which she described as a personal, not business, decision. Brooke Lehman, a former member of Direct Action Network, and Hitomi Matarese, an artist, bought the store from Welsh, and formed a new collective. Bluestockings reopened in May 2003 with a new model as a worker-owned bookstore and activist center. Its intersectional, leftist mission included male and transgender collective members. The founding collective members expanded Bluestockings' titles and event programming to include more social justice topics, including more books on race, class, queer politics, and the environment, in addition to fiction and poetry. Bluestockings expanded into an adjacent storefront in 2005 and began running more social programs like its "Foodstockings" cropsharing initiative.

The store was particularly successful following a 2015 Indiegogo crowdfunding campaign, held to make repairs and replace the store's awning, all of which had been delayed due to high rent in the store's gentrifying neighborhood. They also received increased support after the 2016 United States elections.

The collective hoped to remain on the Lower East Side to oppose the effects of gentrification and keep the store open as a queer safer space. In 2020, due to the coronavirus pandemic, Bluestockings was forced to move from its original location at 172 Allen Street. After extensive fundraising, the bookstore announced that it would remain on the Lower East Side and moved to 116 Suffolk Street. As of April 2021, the bookstore was run as a worker coop.

The bookstore's landlord began the process of evicting the bookstore in October 2023. Bluestockings offered free Narcan kits, and trainings to use them; the bookstore's landlord attributed the attempt to the "unauthorized use of the premises as a medical facility".

=== Closure ===
In September 2025, Bluestockings announced the immediate closure of its storefront, citing unsustainable daily operations after years of strain. The store owed nearly $100,000 to publishers and distributors, had stopped buying new inventory, and relied on donated books. The bookstore faced roughly $12,000 per month in rent. The collective stated it would fulfill outstanding orders through the end of 2025.

== See also ==
- ABC No Rio
- Firestorm Cafe & Books
- Lucy Parsons Center
- LGBT culture in New York City
