= Jock Palfreeman =

Australian anarchist

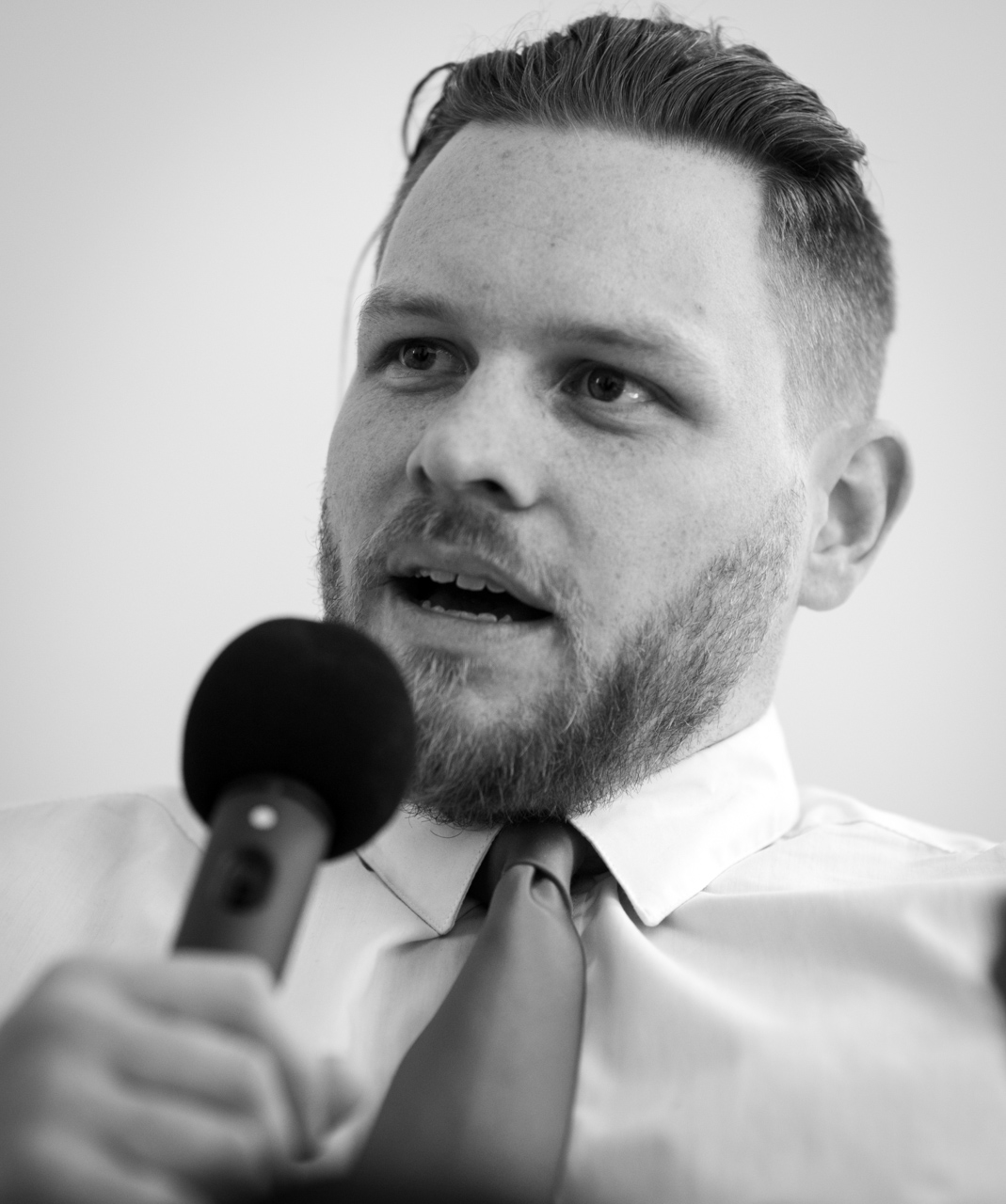
- Born: 1986 (age 39–40); Australia
- Citizenship: Australia
- Occupation: Former soldier
- Movement: Anarchism; Anti-fascism; Prisoners' rights movement Roma rights movement
- Criminal charges: Murder
- Criminal penalty: 20 years in prison and a 450,000 leva fine
- Criminal status: Freed after serving his sentence

Jock Palfreeman, born in 1986 in Australia, is an anti-fascist, anarchist, and former British Army soldier. In 2007, he killed Andrei Monov (20) and injured Antoan Zahariev (19), Bulgarians, during a brawl in Sofia in which Palfreeman claimed he had intervened to protect a Roma person from an attack by Monov's group. He is a founding member of the Bulgarian Prisoners Association (BPA).

Born in Australia to a family of doctors, Palfreeman moved toward the left during his youth when he began reading various political and historical works. Discovering Jack 'the Anarchist' Grancharoff was central to the development of his thinking during this period. Following a trip to Turkey and then to Bulgaria, where he stayed for eight months and forged connections on Bulgarian soil, he joined the British Army. Palfreeman only remained there for a few months because, while on leave in Bulgaria with his friends, he became involved in a violent brawl between a group of about fifteen neo-Nazis, himself, and two Roma persons with unknown identity, whom the group was attacking. Intervening to defend the Roma, he claimed to have been struck very violently with a brick to the back of the head. He drew his knife and stabbed Monov (20) and Antoan Zahariev (19) twice in the back. Monov died from his injuries, Zahariev survived.

The murder shocked Bulgaria and reached the forefront of the Bulgarian political scene: the Interior Minister at the time, Mihail Mikov, and the President of the Bulgarian Supreme Court of Cassation attended the funeral. During his trial and successive appeals, the Bulgarian justice system rejected his defense, refused to consider the matter of the Roma, and preferred to explain Palfreeman's actions by stating that he had attacked the neo-Nazi group alone to "shock Bulgarian society". He was sentenced to twenty years in prison. During his incarceration, he met Grancharoff, who visited him, and founded the Bulgarian Prisoners Association (BPA), which was in links with the Anarchist Black Cross (ABC).

In 2015, he was named Person of the Year by the Bulgarian Helsinki Committee and was released four years later by the Bulgarian courts, triggering unfavorable political reactions within the Bulgarian political classes. He subsequently continued his activism, speaking at an ABC conference in the United Kingdom.

== Biography ==
=== Youth and politicization (1986–2006) ===
Jock Palfreeman was born in 1986 in Australia. He grew up in a family of medical professionals, his father being a medical doctor and his mother a dentist.

During his youth, he read both historical works concerning the Cantonal Revolution (1873) and engaged with more theoretical writings, such as those by Marx, Engels, and Bakunin. Among the authors who influenced him, the discovery of texts by the Bulgarian-Australian anarchist Jack 'the Anarchist' Grancharoff was central to his later anarchist leanings.

=== Travels to Bulgaria and military enlistment (2006–2007) ===
In 2006, he embarked on a trip to Turkey but allowed his visa to expire, choosing instead to complete his journey in Bulgaria. After befriending several people there, he decided to stay for eight months, settling in Samokov.

Following these eight months, Palfreeman traveled to the United Kingdom and enlisted in the British Army, where he obtained the entry-level rank of rifleman.

=== Murder of Andrei Monov and immediate political reactions in Bulgaria ===
On 28 December 2007, while in Sofia on leave and having decided to spend it in Bulgaria with his friends, he witnessed the lynching of a Roma child by a neo-Nazi group called the 'South Division Neo-Nazis'. He sought to protect the child but was set upon by the assailants; Palfreeman fought back violently, was struck in the back of the head with a brick by one of them, and armed himself by grabbing the knife he was carrying. With this knife, he fatally stabbed Andrei Monov, one of the attackers, killing him.

Monov, whom he had just killed, was the son of Bulgarian Socialist MP Hristo Monov, drawing condemnation from the Bulgarian Socialist Party. Lazar Gruev, President of the Supreme Court of Cassation, and Mihail Mikov, Minister of the Interior, attended Monov's funeral.

=== Legal proceedings and sentencing (2007–2009) ===
Contrary to early reports on the case, which stated that Palfreeman was defending a Roma child when he killed Monov, the judges rejected this characterization. They shifted the focus of the trial to other issues and, during the proceedings, he was accused of having 'wanted to shock Bulgarian society', which supposedly explained why he had attacked a group of fifteen people single-handedly.

On 3 December 2009, he was sentenced to twenty years in prison for murder and fined 450,000 leva by the Sofia court. He was imprisoned at the city's central prison.

=== Imprisonment and activism in prison (2009–2019) ===
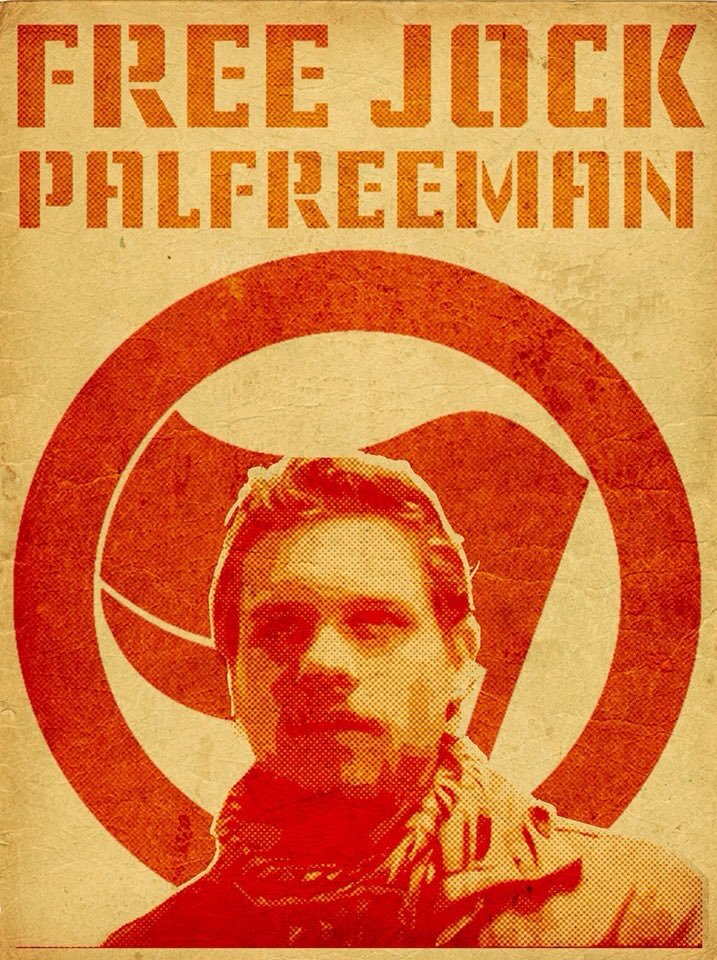
Jock Palfreeman support poster (2019)

Palfreeman established networks within Bulgarian prisons and, the following year, began to informally found the Bulgarian Prisoners Association (BPA), one of the first prisoner unions of the post-Soviet era in the country. Initially unofficial, the BPA was officially recognized in 2012 by the Bulgarian authorities.

In the meantime, his two appeals (2010 and 2014) were rejected. In his first appeal, he produced witnesses speaking of the assault and requested that surveillance cameras be taken into account, which was refused. He also published texts, collaborating on an anarchist book and contributing to several far-left media outlets. According to him, after helping a fellow inmate write a formal complaint about being beaten by a guard, the prison director cut off his access to the online courses he was attending, prompting him to go on a hunger strike. His complaint against the director eventually succeeded, and he was able to resume his studies.

In 2015, he was named Person of the Year by the Bulgarian Helsinki Committee, which sparked protests from right-wing and far-right groups against the nomination.

Throughout his incarceration, Amnesty International refused to support him because he was responsible for a violent crime, which went against the NGO's policy. Instead, he was supported by the Anarchist Black Cross (ABC), which organized demonstrations, fundraising efforts, and sent him numerous letters of support from various local anarchist groups.

Furthermore, he was visited by Grancharoff, who came to the prison to support him; the two reunited, exchanged jokes and banter, with Grancharoff telling him that the prison where he was then held was close to his home village. He also insulted a Bulgarian political figure whose portrait was displayed in the prison.

=== Release and subsequent activities (2019–present) ===
In 2019, his case took a decisive turn when a series of CCTV videos from the day of the murder was published online. These videos challenged the Bulgarian authorities' version of events and clearly showed the neo-Nazi group assaulting an individual prior to the conflict with Palfreeman, leading to renewed calls for his release.

In September 2019, he was placed on parole. This new development sparked political reactions: the leader of the Bulgarian Socialist Party, Korneliya Ninova, declared it a 'disgrace', while the Prime Minister refused to comment on the matter.

Although he was released, the Bulgarian authorities kept his passport, which prevented him from leaving the country. He managed to do so during the COVID-19 pandemic, between 2020 and 2021, after the Bulgarian justice system decided to grant him the right to leave.

In 2020, he was invited to speak at the European Parliament regarding inhumane detention conditions within the Union, but the pandemic prevented the event from taking place.

In April 2021, he took part in an Anarchist Black Cross (ABC) gathering in the United Kingdom, where he spoke and delivered a speech.

== Political thought and stances ==
=== Critiques and internal conflicts within the anarchist movement ===
Since his release, Palfreeman has been highly critical of the Federation of Anarchists in Bulgaria (FAB), accusing it of being a 'front' organization run by 'very dubious' anarchists, and arguing that it should be expelled from the International of Anarchist Federations as long as its stances toward the far right remained unclarified.

According to historian CEP, this was a reaction '[stemming] no doubt from the fact that the FAB refused to support him during his incarceration or even opposed anarchists wishing to do so'. Indeed, the FAB wrote about him in 2009, reacting to the organization of rallies and demonstrations in his favor by anarchists in Greece:

Every year Federation of Anarchist of Bulgaria (FAB) delimit from the case with the murdered of Andrey Monov by australian military Jock Palfreeman. Our official position is that independently from the circumstance Jock killed a man and badly injured another and he is guilty. This is intolerable crime. The dead boy Andrey Monov had friends who were and are anarchists and our position is that he was innocent. [...] The nazis in Bulgaria use this case for their propaganda - 'anarchist from abroad came in Bulgaria and kill brutaly'. So our position is that every kind of solidarity with one killer is shame with every principle of freedom! We call everyone to hold back and don't support this provocated action for solidarity in Athens which we understand is preparing.

== Works ==
- Mapping the Fire : International Words of Solidarity with the Conspiracy of Cells of Fire, The Anarchist Library, 2012

== Bibliography ==
- Dupuy, Rolf; CEP (2025), "GRANCHAROFF, Jelesko [dit "Jack the Anarchist", "Jack GRANSHAW"]", Dictionnaire international des militants anarchistes, Paris
- CEP (2026), "PALFREEMAN, Jock", Dictionnaire international des militants anarchistes, Paris
