= Jack the Anarchist =

Jelesko Grancharoff
- Желязко Грънчаров
- Born: 5 July 1925; Malko Tarnovo, Bulgaria
- Died: May 15, 2016 (aged 90); Australia
- Other name: Jack the Anarchist
- Organization(s): Bulgarian resistance (1940s-1945); Bulgarian Agrarian National Union (1945-1947); Sydney Bulgarian Anarchist group (1955-?); Sydney University Anarchist group (1960s-1970s); Jura Books (1977-2010s)
- Movement: Anarchism

Jelesko Grancharoff (Bulgarian: Желязко Грънчаров; 5 July 1925 – 15 May 2016), better known by his nickname Jack the Anarchist, was a Bulgarian and Australian resistance fighter and anarchist. He is best known for the central role he played within the anarchist movement in Australia, from the 1950s until his death.

Born into a family of agricultural workers in the Bulgarian town of Malko Tarnovo, Grancharoff joined the resistance before reaching his twenties and fought against Nazi forces. He also joined the Bulgarian Agrarian National Union, becoming one of their local officials. After the end of the war, he participated in the Popular Front alongside the communists but adopted increasingly critical positions toward them and began agitating against them. He was arrested and then deported to a concentration camp, where he met anarchists and became an anarchist himself through his contact with them.

Released from the camp and at immediate risk of being rearrested, he left his family and fled to Turkey, where he was arrested once again. In 1949, he managed to reach Italy and succeeded in being accepted into Australia, where he arrived the following year. Starting in 1955, Grancharoff animated a Bulgarian anarchist group and began establishing networks, a process that grew stronger after his arrival in Sydney, where he associated with the Sydney Push. Noted by Australian authorities as a particularly peaceful anarchist, he distributed propaganda within the Sydney Domain and the University of Sydney and subsequently founded a group there, which published their journal, Red and Black over the following decades. From 1977 he associated with Jura Books.

In parallel, he participated in numerous demonstrations and actions, holding a pivotal position within the Australian anarchist movement of that era. Considered a threat to national security by Australian authorities, he was repeatedly denied citizenship until the late 1990s.

Grancharoff died in 2016 at the age of 90 and was cremated at the Wolumla Clavering Park. Since then, his memory has been carried on and continues to influence other anarchists.

== Biography ==
=== Early life and resistance during World War II ===
Jelesko Grancharoff was born on 5 July 1925, in Malko Tarnovo, Bulgaria, a village located 5 km from the Turkish border, into a family of agricultural workers.

He joined the Bulgarian Resistance during World War II and was noted as a young anti-fascist and resistance fighter in his region. According to Australian authorities, he was allegedly imprisoned by the Nazis in a concentration camp, though no precise details regarding this have been found. Initially, he was friends with many communists but later grew closer to the Bulgarian Agrarian National Union, whose ranks he joined.

In 1946, Grancharoff was a member of the Popular Front, which included anti-fascist parties such as the Bulgarian Agrarian and Communist parties. He was invited to the founding meeting of the communist youth by a former Nazi but refused to attend. Because of his anti-fascist background, he was granted the right to found a local branch of the Agrarian Party, becoming its secretary and treasurer.

=== Anti-communist activities and deportation (1946-1947) ===
Between 1946 and 1947, Grancharoff began engaging in anti-communist propaganda by publishing and distributing anti-authoritarian posters. He was highly critical of what he perceived as a takeover of the country by communist forces. Under pressure from the Communist Party, he was expelled from the Agrarian Party and accused of being in the pocket of Turkish conservatism.

In early 1947, he was arrested and deported by the communists to a re-education camp. This facility, simply named the 're-education camp', held a group of deported anarchists. Grancharoff spent seven months there working in the mine; through his regular contact with them, he became an anarchist himself. Given his past as a resistance fighter and his anti-fascist background, the camp authorities released him sooner than others. They required him to sign a declaration stating that he repented for his past actions and fully agreed with the proceedings against him. He agreed to sign in order to gain his freedom and, from that point on, began assessing the possibility of escaping to Turkey.

Three weeks after his release, he was arrested once again and then freed. Friends who were also serving as informants to the Bulgarian authorities warned him that he was going to be rearrested. He then decided to flee the country, crossing the border after lying to his parents by telling them he was going to work. This was the last time he ever saw his parents.

=== Exile in Turkey and Italy (1947-1949) ===
In Turkey, he became involved in the refugee and trade union movements; he demonstrated for the eight-hour workday and was held in pre-trial detention without trial for six months before being released. He decided to leave the country and head to Western Europe. Around 1949, he travelled to Italy to go to the Lesi refugee camp.

In this camp, Grancharoff crossed paths with old friends from the Agrarian Party, with whom he fell out because, having become an anarchist in the meantime, he no longer accepted their political stances. At the time, members of the Agrarian Party held vetting power over Bulgarian immigration to France; consequently, this destination was barred to him. Because he spoke a little Italian, he was interrogated first and was ultimately granted the right to move to Australia. The other members of his group, whose hearings had been postponed by the Australian emigration officer, were denounced as belonging to a leftist group, and none of them was allowed to follow Grancharoff.

=== Arrival and life in Australia (1950-1955) ===
He arrived in Australia on 18 December 1950. He moved from Newcastle to the Greta camp, and then began working as a forestry worker in the town of Imbil. The other workers called him the 'Jew' because he was accused of being lazy and insolent toward the bosses. He left this job because he disliked the insults and mockeries launched at him and went to Mareeba (North Queensland), where he began working as a stonemason, placing stones in front of dams under construction to prevent erosion.

Following his dismissal from this new job, he worked several agricultural jobs in the region's tobacco and plantations. He sought out and associated with some Aboriginal people, but he was warned that continuing to socialise with them could lead to his arrest and deportation, and that it would be better for him to keep his distance. Grancharoff was not making enough money and moved to Sydney to increase his wages, a decision reinforced by the fact that he was trying to bring over a Bulgarian friend and therefore needed funds.

=== Life in Sydney and links with the Sydney Push (1955-1960) ===
Employed by the railways in Sydney, he began to be flagged as an anarchist by Australian authorities in 1955, when he was reported as a member of the Bulgarian anarchist group in Sydney formed around Kristu Encheve. He edited the group's newspaper, titled WILL. Around this time, he began going to the Sydney Domain every Sunday to sell anarchist newspapers (first Freedom, then Red and Black) and to spread propaganda.

In 1956 and the years that followed, he mixed and met with certain members of the Sydney Push, a libertarian intellectual and subcultural movement developing in 1950s Australia. This proximity to Push members was also reflected in his outlook: he believed that the anarchist movement needed to be developed among the Australian population. He was therefore relatively open to the Push and became one of its figures. However, in Australia, where a division then existed between anarchists and libertarians, the latter viewing anarchy as an unachievable utopia, he navigated between both groups. He considered the libertarians' analysis to be correct on many points but criticized their lack of radicalism and their sexual mores, arguing that for them, multi-partner relationships were becoming a norm, to which he objected.

=== Publication of Red and Black, citizenship battles and anarchist organizing (1960-2000s) ===
In 1960, he began giving speeches and lectures, first regarding the Catholic Church and then, in 1965, about Johann Most.

In 1965, Grancharoff founded Red and Black with the Sydney anarchist group, of which he was a leading member. He edited this publication until at least the 2000s. It was named both because of the symbolism of these colors for anarchists and because the members had read Stendhal's The Red and the Black. The project dated back to 1960 but was only launched five years later. On 15 January 1965, he was reported as living at 58 Rainbow Street, Kingsford, with Sheila McKay. He was listed as single in another report from the same year.

The following year, in 1966, he was reported as forming the core of the Sydney University Anarchist Group, where he had resumed his studies, alongside Nestor Grivas, James Lenin Hopkinson, Ken Maddock, William Dyer, and possibly Janko Nedalkov. From 1966 until at least the 1970s, Grancharoff was very close to Dyer.

In 1967, he served as the contact for the Anarchist Discussion Group at the University of Sydney. In April of that year, he participated in several demonstrations, including one against the Greek junta, two against the Vietnam War, and one against the imprisonment of Simon Townsend.

On 10 June 1968, Grancharoff protested against the imprisonment of Townsend at the Infantry Training Centre in Ingleburn.

On 11 April 1969, he demonstrated against conscription, and on the 23rd, against conscription, police violence, and the Vietnam War in Sydney. On 15 December, he took part in an anti-Vietnam War rally at the Sydney Town Hall.

On 16 January 1970, Grancharoff marched in a demonstration for the release of a prisoner alongside Gregory Sydney, Denis Tillins, Francis Freney, Colin Joseph Pollard, and the latter's partner. Three days later, his application for citizenship was rejected because he was deemed a 'threat to national security'. He was one of the first foreign anarchists to apply for Australian citizenship, which caused internal complications for the Australian authorities as they debated how to handle his request. In his citizenship applications, he specified that his name was spelled Grancharoff and not Grancharov.

Between 24 and 26 April 1970, he spoke at the anarchist conference held in Minto, alongside Allan James Baker and Geoffrey Mullen (another member of Red and Black).

During 1971, he was suspected of involvement in the bombing of the USSR embassy in Canberra, carried out by a group of Bulgarian émigrés, but Australian authorities did not implicate him further. Generally, they noted him as a 'propagandist of the word and not the deed' and remarked on his peaceful demeanour during protests. On 23 March 1971, Grancharoff participated in a demonstration for Geoffrey Mullen held outside the Special Federal Court, where Mullen was accused of draft resistance during the Vietnam War.

On 16 April 1971, he participated in a demonstration for Geoffrey Mullen outside the Special Federal Court with Hamilton Cook, Sean Adam Foley, Noel Olive, John Page, and Colin Joseph Pollard. In July of the same year, Grancharoff took part in the second Socialist Scholars and Activists Conference of Australia, where he delivered a speech on 'The formulation of a revolutionary strategy and party'.

Between 30 September 1971 and June 1972, he travelled to Genoa, Italy. He claimed to be leaving for two years to learn Italian but was suspected of making contact with anarchists on trial for the Piazza Fontana bombing (a neo-fascist bombing for which anarchists were falsely accused). Upon returning to Australia, he gave a lecture on 'radical politics after returning from Europe' on 22 June. On 22 November, he attended the trial of companion Michael Matteson for escaping custody.

In 1974, Grancharoff was living at 3 Merchant Street, Stanmore. On 8 February of that year, he participated in a Prisoners' Action Group demonstration at Chifley Square.

The following 10 January, he spoke at the National Anarchists Conference on St. Johns Rd., Glebe, New South Wales, alongside Wendy Bacon. On 13 March, he attended a Builders Labourers Federation demonstration held at Martin Plaza. During this protest, a speaker made gay and LGBTQIA+ rights demands, which were noted by the authorities. In September, he participated in a demonstration outside the Spanish Consulate-General in Sydney following Franco's execution of five activists.

From 1977 onwards, he was a member of the Australian anarchist bookshop Jura Books.

On 9 June 1996, Grancharoff spoke at the national anarchist conference held at La Trobe, where he presented a paper titled 'Marxism and Anarchism'.

After frequent refusals, he received citizenship at the end of the 1990s, more than forty years after arriving in Australia.

=== Later years and death (2000s-2016) ===
In 2013, he gave a lecture on anarchism in Bulgaria. He died on 15 May 2016 and was cremated at Wolumla Clavering Park a few days later.

== Legacy ==
Grancharoff influenced other Australian anarchists and activists, such as Jock Palfreeman, who stated that he grew closer to the anarchist movement through the activist's writings. The two met later when Grancharoff visited him in prison in Bulgaria. Grancharoff explained to him that the prison was close to his native village, and he insulted a portrait of a Bulgarian political figure on display in the prison where they met.

Since his death, his life has inspired a series of Australian thinkers and anarchists, including 'citizen-journalist Takver; Melbourne anti-fascist and anarchist Andy Fleming; and long-time activist and broadcaster Joe Toscano'.

== Works ==
- Red and Black (1965–2000s?) (all issues from No. 1 to No. 29).
- What We Take For Granted (2004).
- The Anarchist-Communist Mass Line: Bulgarian Anarchism Armed (2008).

== Primary sources ==
=== Trial and police files ===
At least several files by ASIO in the National Archives of Australia, including:

- A6119, 976

== Bibliography ==
- Sidari, Danilo; Parissi, Sid; Sheldon, Peter (Fall 2016), Jack Grancharoff (June 7, 1925-May 5, 2016), Anarcho-Syndicalist Review
- Dupuy, Rolf; CEP (2026), "GRANCHAROFF, Jelesko [dit "Jack the Anarchist", "Jack GRANSHAW"]", Dictionnaire international des militants anarchistes, Paris

As of this edit, this article uses content from "GRANCHAROFF, Jelesko", authored by Rolf Dupuy; CEP, which is licensed in a way that permits reuse under the Creative Commons Attribution-ShareAlike 3.0 Unported License, but not under the GFDL. All relevant terms must be followed.
