= Libcom.org =

Online platform for libertarian communism writing

- Website type: Anarchist website
- Available in: English, with some non-English content
- Website: libcom.org
- Launched: 26 September 2003; 23 years ago
- Current status: Online
- Content licence: Creative Commons BY-NC-SA 2.5

Libcom.org is an online platform featuring a variety of libertarian communist essays, blog posts, and archives, primarily in English. It was founded in 2005 by editors in the United States and the United Kingdom. Libcom.org also has a forum and social media features including the ability to comment on post and upload original articles. In contrast with traditional archives, anarchistic archival practices embrace "use as preservation", making use of digital technology to host niche political material in online repositories like Libcom.org.

The site was launched in 2003 originally as enrager.net, named for the enragés of the French Revolution, but changed its name in 2005 to the present name libcom.org, short for libertarian communism. The enrager.net web collective was a splinter of the London group inside the Anarchist Youth Network, an organization founded in 2002 by two members of the Anarchist Federation.

== See also ==
- Spunk Library, a defunct anarchist web archive (1992–2002)
- Anarchy Archives, an online research center on the history and theory of anarchism founded in 1995
