= Wooden Shoe Books and Records =

Anarchist bookshop in Philadelphia, Pennsylvania, United States

Coordinates: 39°56′31″N 75°09′15″W

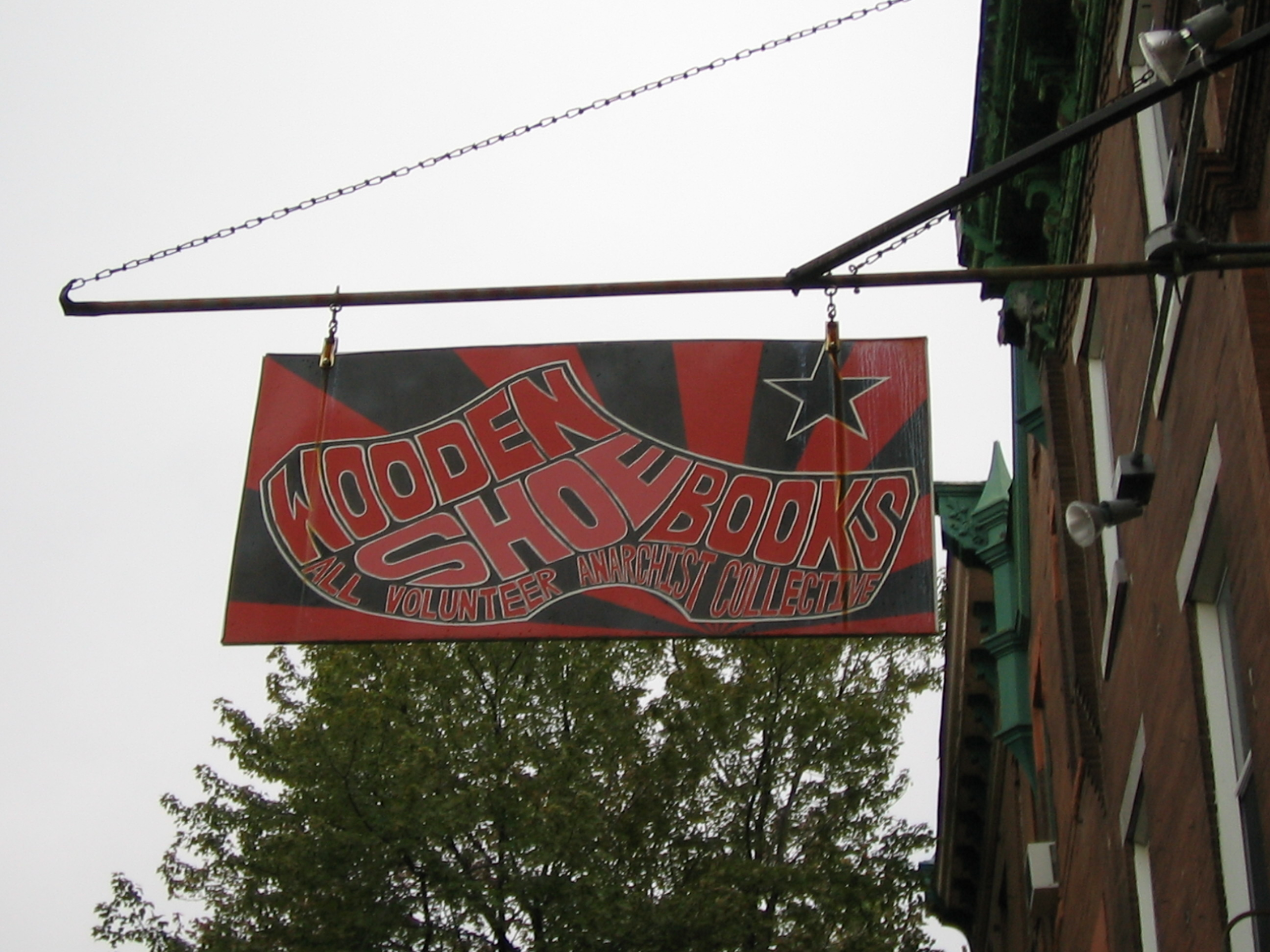
- Sign hanging above Wooden Shoe Books (2006)
- Industry: Book store
- Founded: 1976; 50 years ago
- Headquarters: Philadelphia, Pennsylvania, United States
- Website: www.woodenshoebooks.org

Wooden Shoe Books and Records, also known as The Wooden Shoe, is an anarchist bookstore and infoshop in Philadelphia. Founded in 1976, the store specializes in radical and non-traditional literature. Wooden Shoe is run by an all-volunteer worker collective that encourages community building and anti-capitalist activism.

== Description ==
Located on 704 South Street in the South Street district, Wooden Shoe Books is in its third location. The Wooden Shoe has always been primarily political, created with the intention of consolidating published anarchist materials into one location and providing opportunities for community organizing. The shop volunteers its space to local organizations that align with its political goals of challenging systems of oppression. Events include poetry readings, educational discussions, workshops, author talks, and rock shows. The space also features a community board advertising local events such as book clubs and musical performances.

The Wooden Shoe has been described as a "punk-rabbit-hole-on-acid of a shop." Book categories include Native/Indigenous American Studies, Palestine, situationism, feminism, labor studies, imperialism, the prison–industrial complex, sustainable living, disabilities studies, and anarchism. The collection includes books from anarchist publishers such as Autonomedia, AK Press, and Semiotext(e). In addition to books, the store carries zines, vinyl records, buttons, stickers, posters, and t-shirts.

== History ==
The name of Wooden Shoe Books derives from workers who interrupted production during the Industrial Revolution by throwing wooden shoes (sabots) into machinery. The bookstore opened in January 1976 and was founded by members of Philadelphia Solidarity, a group of libertarian socialists. In a 2021 interview, one of the founders describes that the collective did not anticipate making much of a "profit with just the books, so we also sold vinyl records."

The original location of the shop was in a basement at 20th and Sansom Streets. An electrical fire in 1997 burned the building down, and the store moved to 5th and South Street. Looking for a larger space, in October 2009 the Wooden Shoe moved into its current location at 7th and South Street.

== Organizational structure ==
The Wooden Shoe is a run by an all-volunteer, non-hierarchical collective. Decisions are made by collective members by a consensus process at bi-monthly meetings. The bookstore is a 501(c)(3) organization with a mission of being "an empowering resource for activism, organizing, art, self-education, community-building, and the anti-capitalist struggle." As of 2022, the collective has around thirty-five people to staff the store.
