= Salon Mazal =

Former infoshop in Tel Aviv, Israel

Coordinates: 32°3′54.92″N 34°47′16.8″E

- סלון מזל
- Purpose: Social change, human rights, animal rights, environmentalism, anti-globalization, anti-oppression, consumerism, feminism, gender issues
- Headquarters: 32 Yitzhak Sadeh Street, Tel Aviv, Israel
- Location: Tel Aviv, Israel
- Methods: Lending library, shop, meetings, lectures, workshops, film screenings

Salon Mazal (Hebrew: סלון מזל) was an infoshop in Tel Aviv, Israel. Its purpose was to spread information and raise awareness of issues related to social change, including human rights, animal rights, the environment, globalization, social and economic oppression, consumerism, feminism and gender issues. It ran by an open, non-hierarchical collective of volunteers at 32 Yitzhak Sadeh Street, Tel Aviv.

== Activities ==
Salon Mazal had a lending library, a shop and a space for meetings, lectures, workshops and film screenings. Occasionally there are other projects on various topics of interest, such as youth group meetings, Arabic lessons, DIY workshops, a reading group of anarchist texts.

The lending and reference library stocks several thousand books on subjects related to social change, of which roughly half are in English. The idea behind it is to enable people to read books without encouraging them to buy, thus creating an alternative to the existing consumer culture. Salon Mazal prints and publishes materials on a variety of subjects, including a DIY guide, a guide on wise consumerism, a translated booklet on permaculture, translated anarchist texts, booklets on feminism for men and women.

Workshops, lectures, film screenings, group discussions and meetings on different subjects are held several times a week, open to the public and are free of charge. Salon Mazal also provides a space for study, organization, meeting, planning and working on initiatives and projects for social change, free of charge. Groups who have used the space over the years for their meetings include Anarchists Against the Wall, Indymedia, One struggle, Woman for Woman, Kelaf (The Lesbian Feminist Community), A garden for Peace, The Coexistence Forum in the Negev, The Community Advocate, Shatil - Mixed Cities Project, The Center for Alternative Knowledge and The Committee against House Demolition, the Alternative youth summer camp, New Profile.

=== Store ===
Salon Mazal was one of the distribution points for fair trade products in Israel (coffee, cocoa and olive oil), which was sold at the shop. The market for these products is still very small in Israel, mainly due to lack of awareness. They also offer olive oil from Palestinian farmers in Tulkarm and olive oil soaps from Palestinian farmers in Budrus. The products are imported by Green Action and their production avoids the exploitation of workers or environmental degradation. In addition, they distribute flyers and booklets on fair trade and hold lectures on the subject.

The infoshop is one of the only places in Israel where self-made products and self-published books can be distributed. People are encouraged to sell their products, including artwork, books, poetry books, homemade jams, deodorants, self made political T-shirts and other products made by individuals. In this way the infoshop encourages local, non-industrial production and supports local independent producers.
