= Jenny Brown (feminist) =

American feminist and writer

Jenny Brown is an American organizer in the women's liberation movement and the author of several books on feminism, reproductive rights, and labor. She works with National Women's Liberation, a radical feminist organization of dues-paying women.

== Feminist movement work ==
Brown began studying radical feminism with Gainesville Women's Liberation (GWL), which was founded in 1968 and was the first women's liberation group in the South. She also worked with the Redstockings of the Women's Liberation Movement, developing the Redstockings Archives for Action, a repository of women's liberation history and activist resources. In 2009, GWL and Redstockings collaboratively founded National Women's Liberation (NWL) and Brown became the national organizer of the new group.

In 2019, Brown published Birth Strike: The Hidden Fight over Women's Work, in which she argues that the legal impediments to contraception and abortion access, rather than being discounted as products of prudish religious values, are better understood as a struggle over labor. The book argues that the ruling class, fearing the economic consequences of a declining birth rate, restricts access to contraception and abortion, intending to push more women into performing the labor of bearing and raising children. But women, she concludes, are engaged in a sort of labor strike––refusing to perform that labor in a world where they lack affordable healthcare, affordable childcare, paid work leave, job protections, and reliable male partners.

== Campaign for access to emergency contraception ==
Brown was involved in the campaign to make Plan B, the "morning-after pill," available over-the-counter in the United States.

In 1999, the United States Food and Drug Administration (FDA) found Plan B safe and effective, but approved it only for prescription use. In 2001, a group of reproductive health professionals petitioned the FDA to make it available over-the-counter. The FDA eventually denied the petition in June 2006.

Brown and other NWL activists organized against the FDA. In January 2005, Brown was one of nine women arrested for a sit-in blocking access to the entrance of the FDA headquarters in Maryland, and was one of the plaintiffs in a lawsuit that ultimately resulted in a federal court ruling, Tummino v. Hamburg, 936 F. Supp. 2d 162 (E.D.N.Y. 2013), requiring the FDA to make Plan B available over-the-counter, without a prescription and without age restrictions.

Brown and NWL continue to advocate for the expansion of access to emergency contraception, including by making it directly available on school campuses and pushing for universal health care.

== Labor movement work ==
In Gainesville, Florida, Brown co-chaired the Alachua County Labor Party for ten years. She also worked as a writer and editor for Labor Notes and is a frequent contributor to Jacobin.

== Bibliography ==
- Brown, Jenny (2019). Without Apology: The Abortion Struggle Now. New York: Verso Books. ISBN 1788735846.
- Brown, Jenny (2019). Birth Strike: The Hidden Fight over Women's Work. Oakland: PM Press. ISBN 162963638X.
- Bradbury, Alexandra; Brenner, Mark; Brown, Jenny; Slaughter, Jane; Winslow, Samantha (2014). How to Jump-Start Your Union: Lessons from the Chicago Teachers. Detroit: Labor Notes. ASIN 0914093010.
- Brown, Jenny; Coenen, Amy; Sarachild, Kathie (2001). Women's Liberation and National Health Care: Confronting the Myth of America. New York: Redstockings. ISBN 061512187X.
