= Internationalist Books =

Coordinates: 35.9110°N 79.0606°W

Internationalist Books and Community Center, located in Carrboro, North Carolina, was a volunteer-operated infoshop, non-profit collective, and community center for local activists. The store name was a reference to the political philosophy of internationalism. Often, the center was called "The Internationalist" or merely "Eye Books" by its volunteers, members, and supporters.

Internationalist Books sold new and used books, alternative magazines, local and small press materials, Fanzine/zines, and related material. It closed in September of 2016.

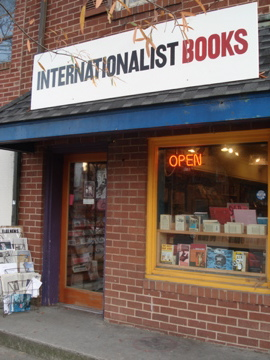
Internationalist Books in Chapel Hill, NC, November 2006

== History ==
=== Bob Sheldon ===
Bob Sheldon founded Internationalist Books in 1981. Opened as a small reading room above a bar on Henderson Street near the campus of the University of North Carolina at Chapel Hill, Sheldon aimed at providing alternative information during the anti-apartheid movement in the 80s as well as a place to share Marxist literature. When the bookstore was opened, Sheldon described the store's mission as follows:

We are dedicated to the position that we have no country: we do not support mindless patriotic pleas for 'national unity,' nor are we interested in keeping America number one. We support the unity and liberation of oppressed people worldwide and are working toward the day when all oppression and inequality will be removed from the earth.

To support his project, Sheldon held jobs in various capacities throughout North Carolina. In the 1970s Sheldon worked at the Cone Mills-Eno textile plant in an attempt to organize workers into a union. He was fired for disseminating pro-union materials while on the floor of the plant. In the 1980s, Sheldon was employed as a nurse. In the late 1980s, Internationalist Books became a successful enough enterprise, such that Sheldon was able to quit his "day jobs" to focus on managing the bookstore. In 1986, the Internationalist became the center for organizing opposition to the Shearon Harris Nuclear Plant. In January 1991, the Internationalist organized opposition to the Gulf War, with Sheldon making appearances on WRAL-TV to speak against the war.

On February 21, 1991, Bob Sheldon was shot and killed as he was closing the store for the evening. The Chapel Hill Police Department began a brief investigation, first focusing its efforts on friends and loved ones, later turning the focus on the theory that the murder was the result of a botched robbery. The investigation stalled when no clear suspects could be identified nor any physical evidence could be collected. No arrests were ever made and the murderer still remains at large and the case remains open. (The band Sonic Youth later recorded a song about the murder, "Chapel Hill," on their 1992 album Dirty.)

=== Collective ===
Following the death of the bookstore's founder, with an outpouring of support from the community, the Internationalist reopened as a nonprofit cooperative with a volunteer/membership structure. Since 1991, the Internationalist has carried on the work begun by Bob Sheldon by hosting social justice workshops, meetings, campaigns, conferences, and providing facilities and resources to a diverse range of grassroots organizations.

The Internationalist moved to 405 West Franklin Street in 1995. In 1997, the Internationalist headed efforts to organize a Housekeepers Association at the University of North Carolina to better the working conditions and wages of non-academic employees of the University. In 2000, the Internationalist Books was awarded the Independent Weekly's Citizen Award for their work as a progressive community organization.

In 2006, the Internationalist celebrated its 25th anniversary with special events, a commemorative ceremony in which Chapel Hill Mayor Kevin Foy declared February 21 "Bob Sheldon Day", and by publishing a book which compiled a collection of 25 local hidden histories.

=== Relocations ===
Originally located on Rosemary Street in Chapel Hill, North Carolina, the center stayed in the town moving to West Franklin Street in 1994. In September 2014, it relocated again to a building with more space on Lloyd Street in Carrboro.

== Volunteers ==
In its last incarnation, over thirty regular volunteers, two volunteer managers, and a six-member Board of Directors handled the day-to-day operation of Internationalist Books and Community Center. The volunteers' main responsibilities included staffing the bookstore, handling the daily customer sales and upkeep of the store, bookkeeping, book ordering, staffing/schedule coordinator, book tabling at local events, coordinating events in-store, newsletters, fundraising, and much more. Grammy-nominated recording artist Tift Merritt was once a volunteer of the Internationalist.

== Projects/Events ==
Volunteers were involved in a number of projects which operate from the Internationalist. The bookstore was the headquarters for the Internationalist Prison Books Collective, a prisoner support group serving inmates throughout the Southeastern United States. The Internationalist was formerly the headquarters for North Carolina Indymedia. The bookstore housed a radical lending library. The Internationalist also served as the hub for anti-war organizing throughout the Triangle, including having sent busloads of protesters to Washington, D.C. The center sponsors the annual Carrboro Book Fair, the "Against the Grain" series, the Desert City Poetry Series, and the annual Bob Sheldon Award. In addition, the bookstore frequently played host to a number of readings and events by authors and artists such as Inga Muscio, Michelle Tea, Timothy Tyson, and Reverend Billy of the Church of Stop Shopping. The center also hosted a twice-monthly Trans Discussion Group sponsored by the North Carolina Harm Reduction Coalition.
