= Freedom Shop =

Anarchist bookstore in Wellington, New Zealand

Coordinates: 41°17′43.04″S 174°46′35.32″E

The Freedom Shop is an anarchist infoshop which distributes books and information, based in Wellington, New Zealand. It operates on a non profit basis, injecting any income back into the project. The shop has been based in different locations and mainly sells books on anarchism, feminism, indigenous rights, ecology and a range of activist issues. It also carries patches, badges, clothing and music.

== History ==
The Freedom Shop was established on May 1, 1995. It was based on upper Cuba Street in Te Aro, in a building formerly occupied by the NORML shop. NORML initially kept up with the rent. The shop was operated by volunteers, and any earnings were reinvested in the business. The shop sold books, magazines, pamphlets, leaflets, T-shirts, patches, records, and stickers.

In the 2000s, plans for the construction of the Wellington Inner City Bypass meant that the Freedom Shop would be evicted. However, the plans were bitterly contested. When security guards employed by Transit NZ broke into the shop and changed the locks, 50 activists broke in and briefly re-opened it.

The Freedom Shop moved into a more prominent location in the Cake Shop (a community infoshop/internet cafe in mid Cuba St). When the Cake Shop closed in 2005, the Freedom Shop relocated to Oblong (a community infoshop/internet cafe) in Te Aro's left bank arcade. Oblong closed in early 2009, and The Freedom Shop reverted to running stalls at public events. However, for the last few years the Freedom Shop has a home in a corner of the Newtown Opportunity for Animals Co-op Shop in Riddiford St, Newtown, Wellington.

== Publications ==
In 2014, the collective published the first issue of a periodical called AARGH! as the Aotearoa Anarchist Review. Issue ten was published in April 2019.

== Affiliations ==
The collective maintains close links with Aotearoa Indymedia and local radical groups such as the 128 Community Centre.
