= Alternative Media Project =

Anarchist non-profit organization

The Alternative Media Project is a non-profit organization that promotes anarchist media.

== Infoshop.org ==
The now-defunct Infoshop.org was founded in January 1995 as the Mid-Atlantic Infoshop. Infoshop was established as a general resource on anarchism, moving to the domain name Infoshop.org in 1998. According to its website, "[t]he Infoshop project is run by a collective of anarchists, anti-authoritarians, socialists and people of other political stripes. We don't adhere to a specific flavor of anarchism or libertarianism, but we've often been called 'big tent anarchists.' We take that to mean that we provide a wide range of anarchist news, opinion and information with the idea that our readers and users have the freedom to make use of that info as they see fit."

A prominent feature of the site was Infoshop News, an open publishing newswire similar to that of Indymedia.
