= Firestorm Books & Coffee =

Worker-owned infoshop in North Carolina, US

Coordinates: 35°34′54.9″N 82°36′5.98″W

Firestorm Books
- Established: May 2008; 18 years ago
- Headquarters: 1022 Haywood Rd

Firestorm Books is a worker-owned and self-managed "anti-capitalist business" in Asheville, North Carolina. Named after the firestorm, this infoshop operates with an eye on creating a sustainable, radical community event space. Firestorm features regular events, such as film screenings, political and economic teach-ins, local and traveling musicians and community workshops.

Firestorm opened in May 2008 and is run by an LGBTQ collective.

== History ==
In May 2010, Firestorm was named the "#2 Best Slow Money Business in America" by the Slow Money Alliance. In December 2011, Firestorm was featured in a list of the "10 Coolest Independent Coffee Shops Across the US" surveyed by Zagat, a U.S. publisher of popular restaurant guides.

In January 2014, the Firestorm Collective announced that they would be closing their downtown space and looking for a new location in West Asheville. Firestorm was closed from March 2014 to July 2015. In July 2015, the collective officially opened a new space on Haywood Road in West Asheville, under the name Firestorm Books & Coffee. The name change reflected the expanded focus on operating as a bookstore.

In August 2018, Firestorm was cited by the City of Asheville for hosting a weekly needle exchange event that included the distribution of clean syringes and naloxone. The city alleged that they were operating in violation of zoning code. The violations were later dropped without disruption to the activities originally cited on condition that the site maintain a medical personnel on site.

Firestorm purchased a former car repair shop near their second location in 2022 and renovated it to become their new storefront. The store donated the land to the Asheville-Buncombe Community Land Trust.

In December 2023, Firestorm revealed that they had acquired more than 22,000 books removed from Duval County Public Schools in Florida and intended to send them back to children in Florida for free. How the store obtained the books, which had been the subject of national media attention, is unclear.

Firestorm has hosted many notable speakers, including economist Thomas Greco, gay activist Wayne Besen, the Beehive Collective, environmental scholar Kirkpatrick Sale, activist educator Bill Ayers, and feminist organizer Jenny Brown.

== Structure ==
Firestorm is owned and operated by the Firestorm Collective, a cooperative body that uses formal consensus decision-making and job complexes to equitably distribute labor and responsibility. In keeping with its identity as an anti-capitalist business, Firestorm is committed to operation without profit, returning 100% of would-be profits to the community.
