= Beehive Design Collective =

Non-profitable art collective

The Beehive Design Collective
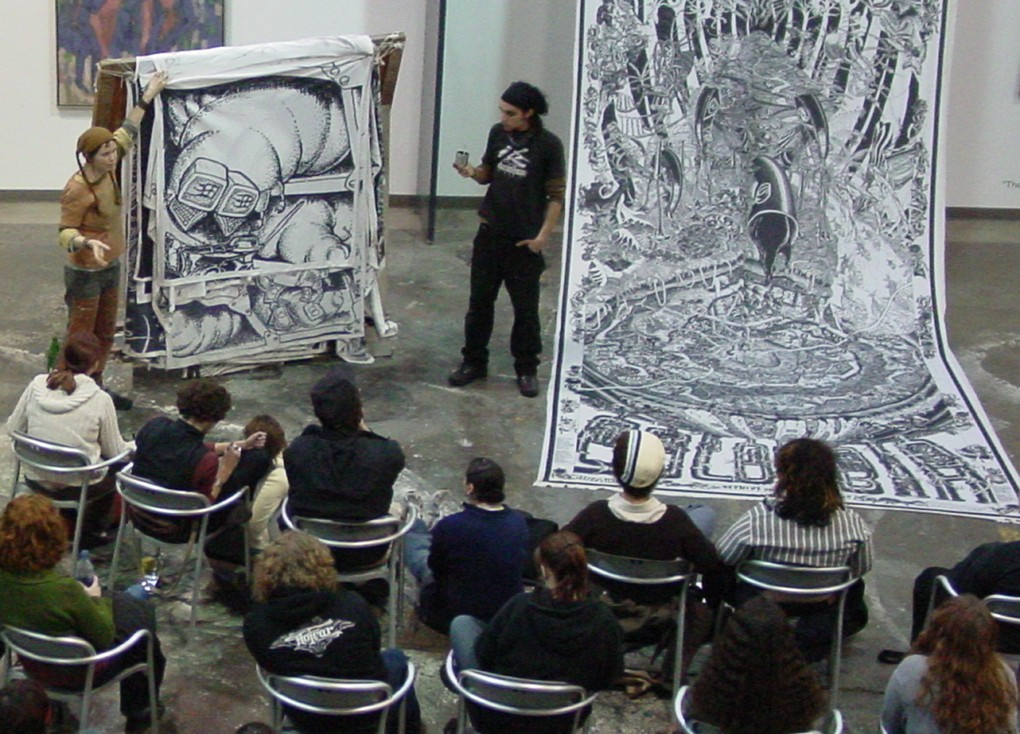
- Founded: 2000
- Purpose: resistance to corporate globalization
- Location: Machias, Maine
- Region served: World
- Method: graphical media
- Website: beehivecollective.org

The Beehive Design Collective is a volunteer-driven non-profit art collective that uses graphical media as educational tools to communicate stories of resistance to corporate globalization. The purpose of the Machias, Maine-based group is to "cross-pollinate the grassroots" by creating collaborative, anti-copyright images that can be used as educational and organizing tools. The most recognizable of these images are large format pen and ink posters, which seek to provide a visual alternative to deconstruction of complicated social and political issues ranging from globalization, free trade, militarism, resource extraction, and biotechnology.

Their work has been included in curated exhibitions internationally, including at the Station Museum of Contemporary Art and Manifesta. One of their most well-known works, Mesoamérica Resiste, was a nine-year research project working directly with communities in Central America regarding effects of the Mesoamerica Project, and is typical of their community-engaged style of production.

== Graphic campaigns ==
Example of Beehive Design Collective graphic work

The Collective creates graphic campaigns addressing diverse geo- and socio-political issues. The illustrations are informed and developed through extensive research. The work for the poster began in 2004, and by 2010 the group had distributed over 10,000 posters in the Americas. A 2012 campaign resulted from travel to Mexico and interviews of a broad spectrum of people. The “Mesoamerica Resiste” poster was used as their aid in this campaign and was unveiled in December 7, 2012 at the Machias Grange Hall. The group adheres to self-imposed rules during their campaign production, including absence of literal human depictions, use of cross-cultural imagery, and avoidance of cultural appropriation. The group bills its pieces as “portable murals,” using them as educational pieces while they travel around the world to do speaking engagements.

The current trilogy in progress details globalization in the western hemisphere through a series of three graphics.

== Storytelling ==
The Collective's educational work involves storytelling, international lecture circuits using giant reproductions of their posters as storytelling aids. "Picture lectures" feature a 30-feet high graphic and a 6-foot-tall (1.8 m) fabric flipbook/storybook. Audiences are led through a two-hour interactive, conversational presentation.

== Print distribution ==
One of the Beehive's goals in their graphic distribution is to have 50% of each print run distributed free to communities in the global south, including to groups working on the issues depicted in the prints. The remaining half are distributed internationally for donations. Posters are distributed at a wide range of venues, events, college campuses and academic events.

All of the Beehive Collective's materials are distributed as anti-copyright, and their production is encouraged for non-profit, non-commercial use to assist in publications and productions. The black and white imagery is designed to facilitate ease of reproduction. The Beehive distributes free clip-art digital imagery via their website and graphic CD-ROMs distributed from their webstore.

=== Graphic chronology ===
- Biodevastation (2000, redux 2002)
- Homogenization Puppeteer (2000) more info
- Free Trade Area of the Americas (2001, redux 2003)
- Plan Colombia (2002, redux 2003)
- Latin American Solidarity 2003 Conference (2003)
- Maine Social Forum (2006)
- Biojustice (2007)
- The True Cost of Coal (2010)
- Mesoamérica Resiste (2013)
- The Callegory (2026)

== Machias Valley Grange Hall ==
Since the year 2000, the Collective has been engaged in the restoration of the Machias Valley Grange Hall in Machias, Maine, built in 1904. The restoration labor was sourced from visiting volunteers. The building was initially used as the Collective's center of its stone mosaics program.

Annually, the Collective throws a no-cost dress-up dance party of immense proportions called the "Blackfly Ball". There are ongoing events such as a weekly Open Mic night and annual Halloween celebration.

In 2007, the Machias Valley Grange Hall was placed onto the National Register of Historic Places.
