= Catalyst Infoshop =

Former infoshop and radical community center Arizona, US

Coordinates: 34°32′22.57″N 112°28′26.04″W

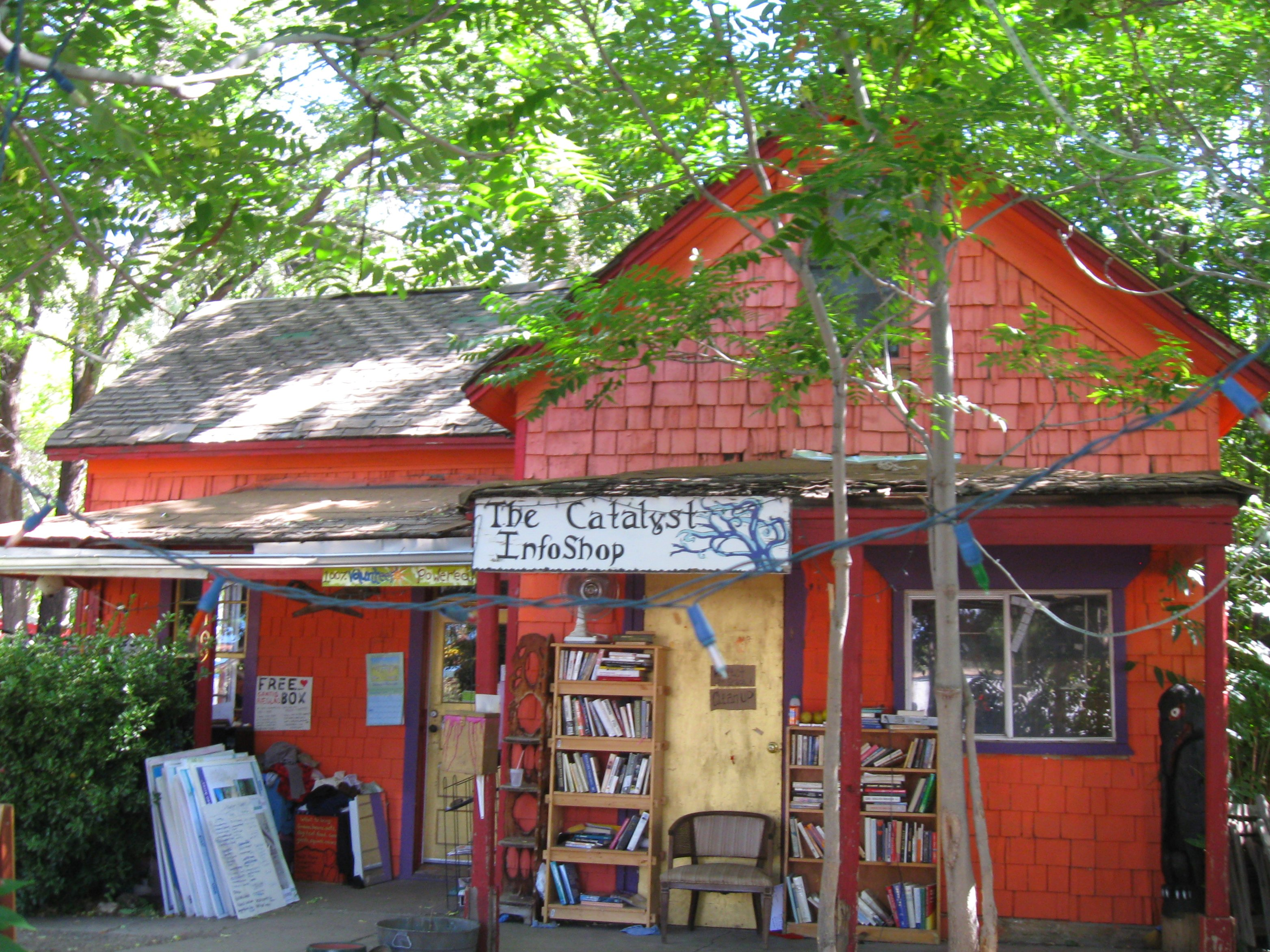
The infoshop in 2009

The Catalyst Infoshop was an infoshop and bookshop at 109 N. McCormick Street, Prescott, Arizona, founded in 2004. It had closed by 2010.

== Foundation ==
Catalyst Infoshop was founded in an old railroad cabin in Prescott, Arizona in 2004, by Katie Rose Nelson and William C. Rodgers. The space was used for a reading group, a philosophy salon, a knitting circle, a high school girl club, a free school and an all ages venue. It was fostered by Prescott College. By 2010, the infoshop had closed down.

== Raid ==
On December 7, 2005, Catalyst Infoshop was raided by federal agents working on information provided by Jacob Ferguson. Rodgers and Nelson were both arrested. The raid was part of Operation Backfire, investigating the Earth Liberation Front. Rodgers was charged with masterminding the arson that destroyed the Two Elk Lodge in Vail, Colorado in 1998.

Rodgers committed suicide by self-asphyxiation, in jail, two weeks after his arrest and before standing trial.
