= Infoshop =

Space for distributing political and subcultural information

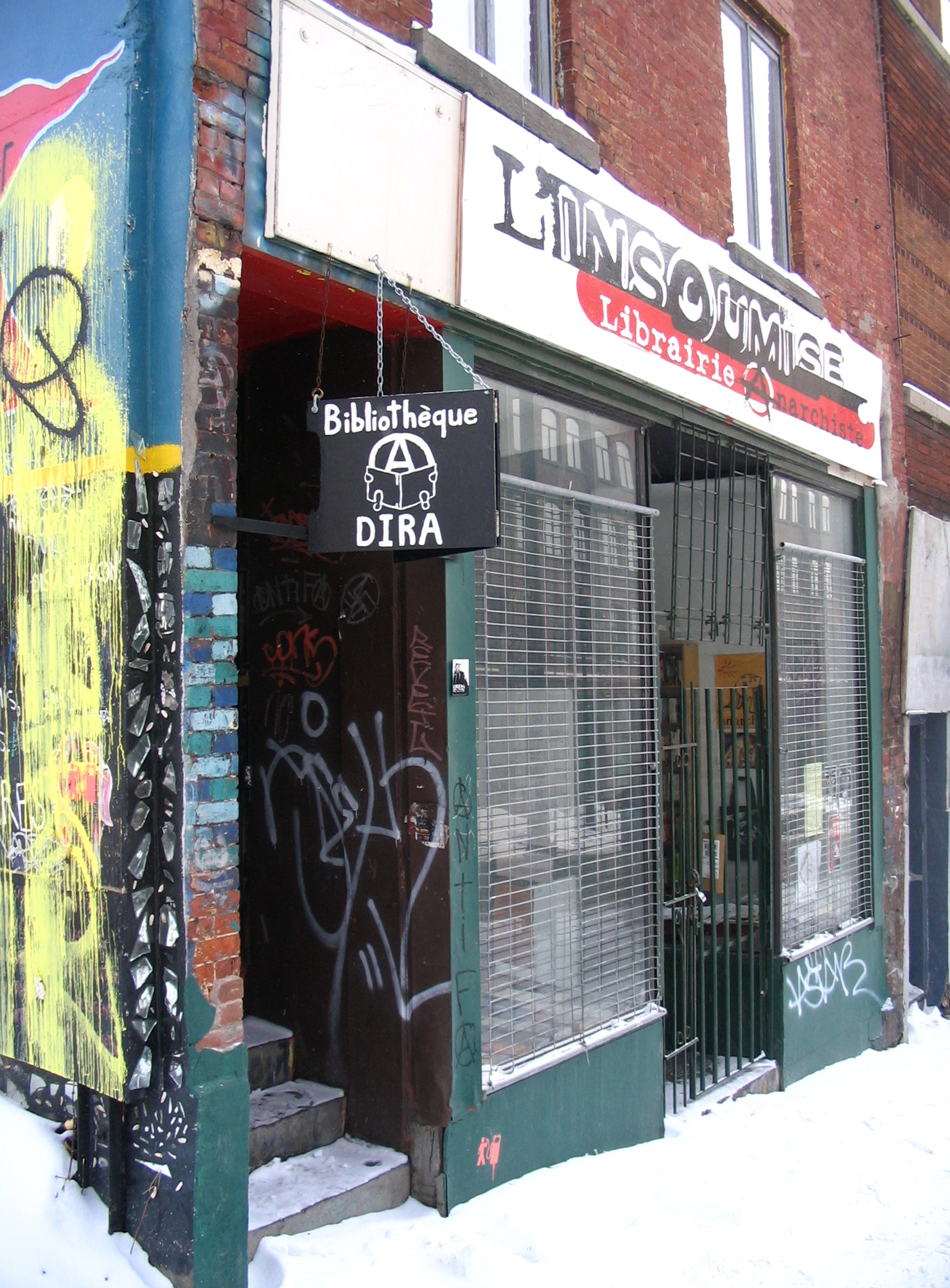
Exterior of L'Insoumise infoshop and bookstore in Montreal, Canada.

Infoshops are places in which people can access anarchist or autonomist ideas. They are often stand-alone projects, or can form part of a larger radical bookshop, archive, self-managed social centre or community centre. Typically, infoshops offer flyers, posters, zines, pamphlets and books for sale or donation. Other items such as badges, locally produced artworks and T-shirts are also often available. Infoshops can also provide printing and copying facilities for people to produce their own literature or have a meeting space.

Infoshops can be found in many cities in North America and Western Europe, and also in other locations around the world such as Australia, Israel and New Zealand. They are oftentimes self-managed spaces run by volunteers which vary in size and function, depending on local context.

== Radical spaces ==
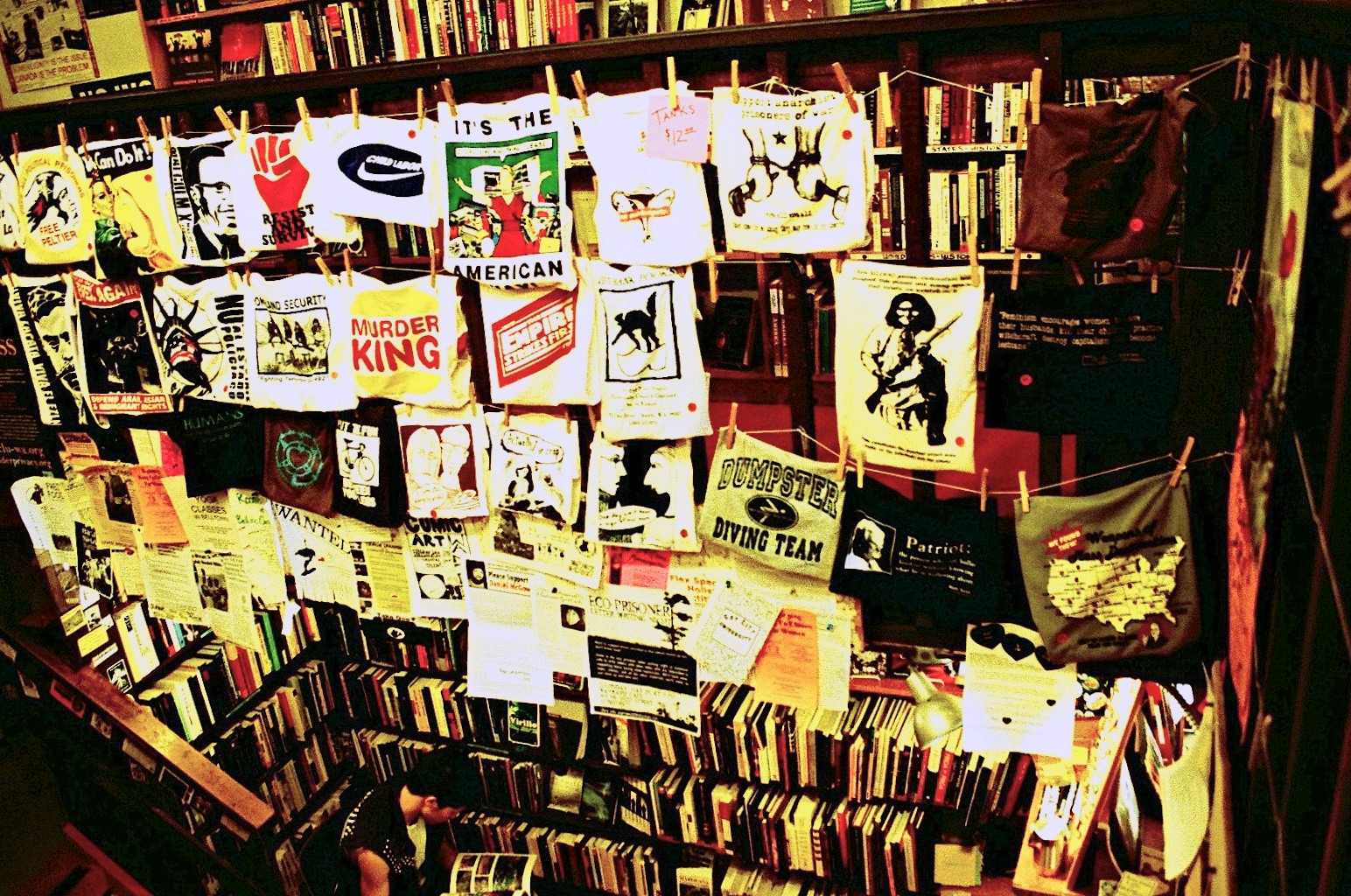
Interior of Left Bank Books in Seattle, Washington, 2006.

An infoshop (the word being a portmanteau of information and shop) is a physical space where people can access radical ideas through flyers, posters, zines, pamphlets and books. It also provides a space to meet other people and in some cases to organise events such as meetings or fundraisers. Some infoshops have computers, copy machines and printers so that pamphlets, position papers, articles, magazines, and newspapers can be created and then circulated between the network of spaces.

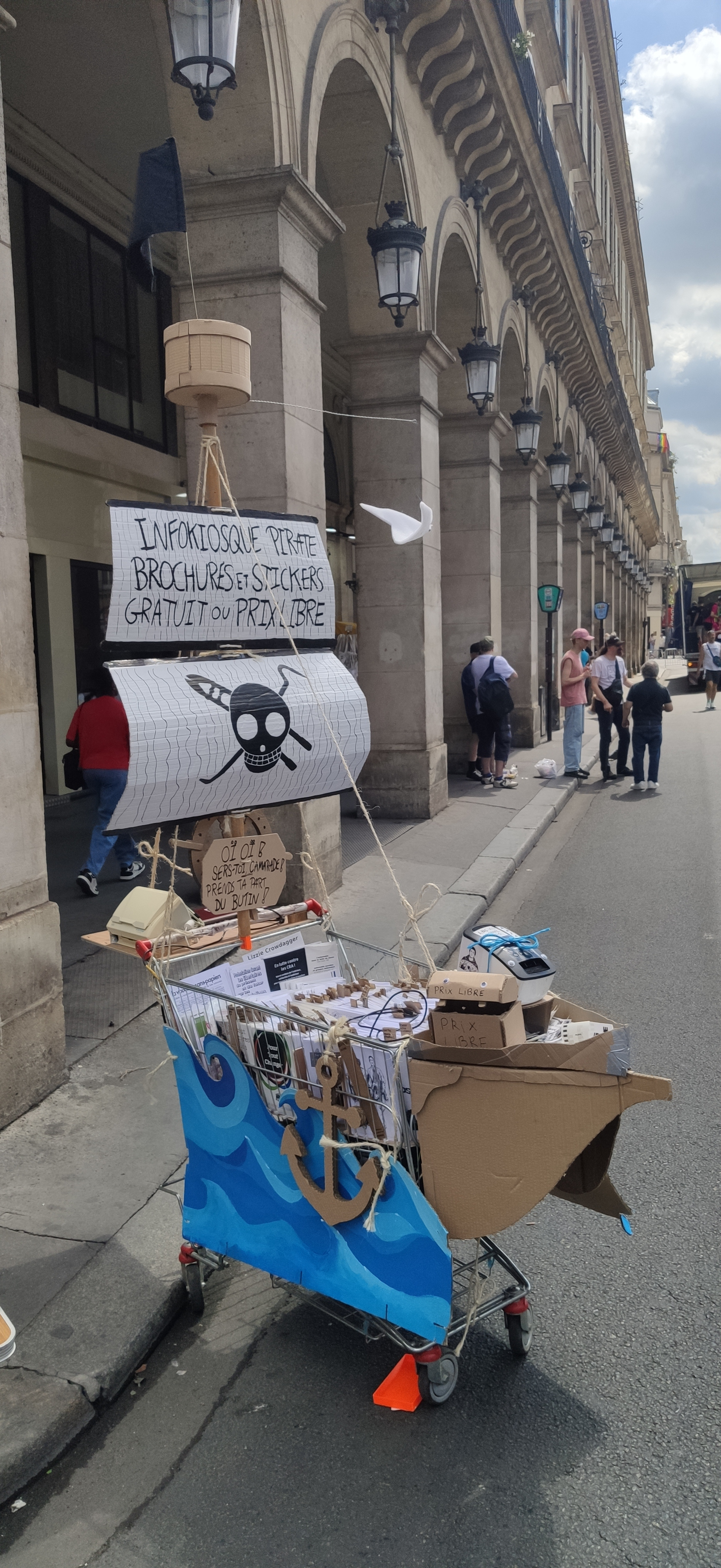
A movable infoshop, made out of a shopping cart and decorated as a pirate boat, in the streets of Paris.

Academic Chris Atton describes the infoshop as a "forum for alternative cultural, economic, political and social activities." For example, in a flyer announcing its planned activities, the Autonomous Centre of Edinburgh (ACE) stated it would make available locally produced arts and crafts, records, T-shirts, badges, books, zines and information. When it opened the following year, ACE provided flyers, leaflets, newsletters, magazines and journals about causes such as antivivisectionism, anti-monarchism, hunt sabotage and jobseeker's allowance advice.

Like social centres, infoshops vary in size and function depending on local context. Many contemporary anarchists first come into contact with radical politics through an infoshop.

Infoshops tend to be run on a voluntary basis by a non-hierarchical collective. The spaces are non-profit and self-managed.

== Antecedents ==
In the United Kingdom, early antecedents of infoshops were the radical presses such as Giles Calvert's printshop (1600s) and John Doherty's coffee house (1830s). More recently, infoshops were associated with squatted anarchist social centres such as the 121 Centre in Brixton, London and the Free Information Network (FIN).

Writing in Maximumrocknroll in the 1990s, Chuck Munson placed North American infoshops in the lineage of peace and justice community centres and acknowledged the influence of European social centres. Munson also stated there were over 60 infoshops (infoladen) in Germany which were connected to the anarchist, autonomist, squatting and punk movements.

== Around the world ==
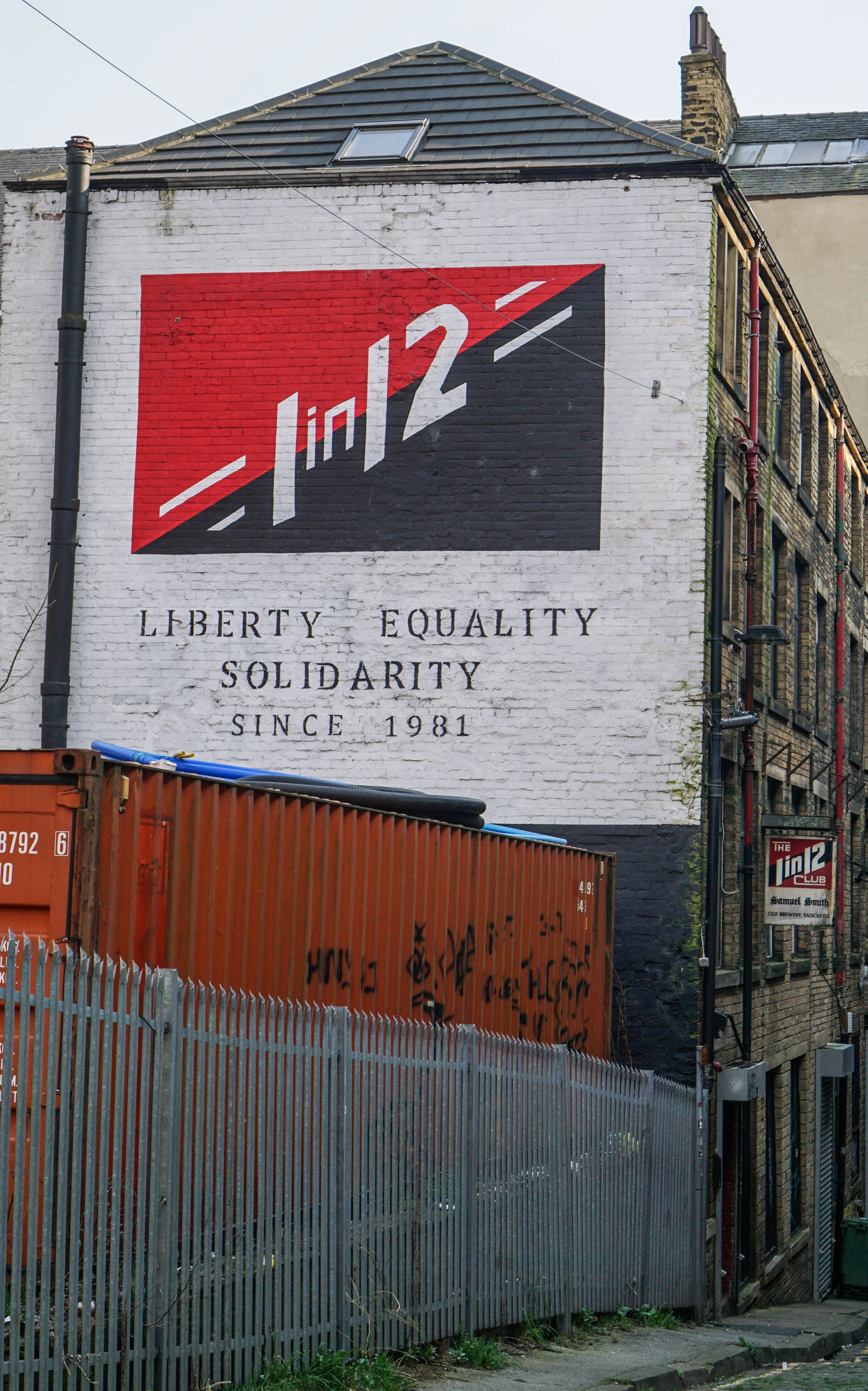
The 1 in 12 Club.

Self-managed social centres in Italy, such as Forte Prenestino in Rome, often contain infoshops.

Social centres in the United Kingdom often contain infoshops, such as for example the Cowley Club in Brighton and the 1 in 12 Club in Bradford. There is also the 56a Infoshop in London. In the mid-2000s, as well as these spaces, there were infoshops in Leeds, Manchester, Norwich and Nottingham.

In the 1990s, there were the following infoshops in North America: 223 Center (Portland, Oregon); 404 Willis (Detroit); A-Space (Philadelphia); Arise! Bookstore & Resource Center (Minneapolis); Autonomous Zone (Chicago); Beehive Infoshop (Washington DC); Blackout Books (New York City); Crescent Wrench Infoshop (New Orleans); Croatan (Baltimore); Emma Center (Minneapolis); Epicenter (San Francisco); Long Haul (Berkeley); Lucy Parsons Center (Cambridge); Mayday Books (Minneapolis); Who's Emma (Toronto); Wooden Shoe Books (Philadelphia).

Elsewhere in the world, projects include Jura Books in Australia, Salon Mazal in Israel and Freedom Shop in New Zealand.

Related projects include anarchist archives, bunkos in Japan and community libraries.

== Notable infoshops ==
Name	Location	Established	Status
1 in 12 Club	Bradford, UK	1988	Ongoing
121 Centre	London, UK	1989	Former
56a Infoshop	London, UK	1991	Ongoing
ABC No Rio	New York, US	1980	Ongoing
Autonomous Centre of Edinburgh	Edinburgh, UK	1997	Ongoing
The Big Idea	Pittsburgh, PA, US	2001	Ongoing
BIT	London, UK	1968	Former
Boxcar Books	Bloomington, US	2001	Former
Brian MacKenzie Infoshop	Washington DC, US	2003	Former
Camas Bookstore and Infoshop	Victoria, Canada	2007	Ongoing
Catalyst Infoshop	Prescott, US	2004	Former
Civic Media Center	Gainesville, FL	1993	Ongoing
Cowley Club	Brighton, UK	2002	Ongoing
Firestorm Cafe & Books	Asheville, US	2008	Ongoing
Forte Prenestino	Rome, Italy	1986	Ongoing
Freedom Shop	New Zealand	1995	Ongoing
Grote Broek	Nijmegen, Netherlands	1984	Ongoing
Insoumise	Montreal, Canada	2004	Ongoing
Internationalist Books	Chapel Hill, US	1981	Former
Jura Books	Sydney, Australia	1977	Ongoing
Red Emma's Bookstore Coffeehouse	Baltimore, US	2004	Ongoing
Salon Mazal	Tel Aviv, Israel	1968	Former
Spartacus Books	Vancouver, Canada	1973	Ongoing
Sumac Centre	Nottingham, UK	1984	Ongoing
Vrijplaats Koppenhinksteeg	Leiden, Netherlands	1968	Former
Warzone Centre	Belfast, UK	1986–2003, 2011–2018	Former
Wooden Shoe Books and Records	Philadelphia, US	1976	Ongoing
Lucy Parsons Center	Boston, US	1969	Ongoing

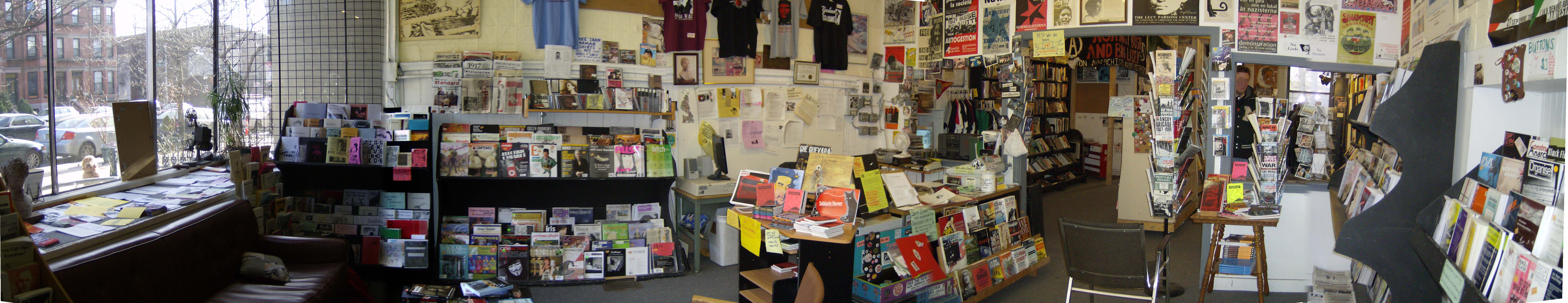
A panoramic view of the interior of the Lucy Parsons Center in Boston, United States.

== See also ==
- Arts centre
- Anarchist bookfair
- Cultural centre
- CrimethInc.
- Category:Infoshops, notable infoshops
- Zine library
