= Dana Ward =

American academic

- Known for: Founding the Anarchy Archives

Academic background
- Education: Yale University

Academic work
- Discipline: Political psychology
- Website: Dana Ward publications on Academia.edu

Dana Ward is professor emeritus of Political Studies at Pitzer College, where he founded and maintains the Anarchy Archives and where he taught from 1982 through 2012. He was the Executive Director of the International Society of Political Psychology from July 1998 to the Fall of 2004.

== Biography ==
Ward completed a BA at UC Berkeley, an MA (political science) at University of Chicago, and a double PhD (political science and psychology) at Yale University. Ward served on the faculty at the Claremont Graduate University (Psychology), taught at Saint Joseph's University (autumn 1981 through to spring 1982), at Ankara University (1986 Fulbright Fellowship), at the Hopkins–Nanjing Center (from the fall of 1990 through the spring of 1992), and at the Miyazaki International College in Miyazaki, Japan (January 1995 through January 1997).

== Publications ==
- "Political reasoning and cognition: a Piagetian view," Rosenberg, Ward and Chilton (1988). Political Reasoning and Cognition. Durham: Duke University Press. ISBN 0-8223-0856-8.
- Review of "Emma Goldman: An Exceedingly Dangerous Woman," Mel Bucklin, Director, American Historical Review, October 2004, pp. 1248–49.
- "Occupy, Resist, and Produce: Workers Take Control in Argentina", Divergences Vol.1, 4 (November 2006)
- "Herbert Read's Aesthetic Politics: Art and Anarchy," in Paraskos, Michael, ed. (2007). Re-Reading Read: New Views of Herbert Read. London: Freedom Press.
- "Alchemy in Clarens: Kropotkin and Reclus, 1877–1881." in New Perspectives on Anarchism. eds., Nathan Jun and Shane Wahl, Lexington Books, 2010.
- "Anarchist Culture on the Cusp of the 20th Century", in Without Borders or Limits: An Interdisciplinary Approach to Anarchist Studies. Edited by Jorell A. Meleéndez Badillo and Nathan J. Jun. Newcastle upon Tyne: Cambridge Scholars Publishing, 2013, pp. 107–122
