= Red Emma's =

Radical infoshop in Baltimore, Maryland, US

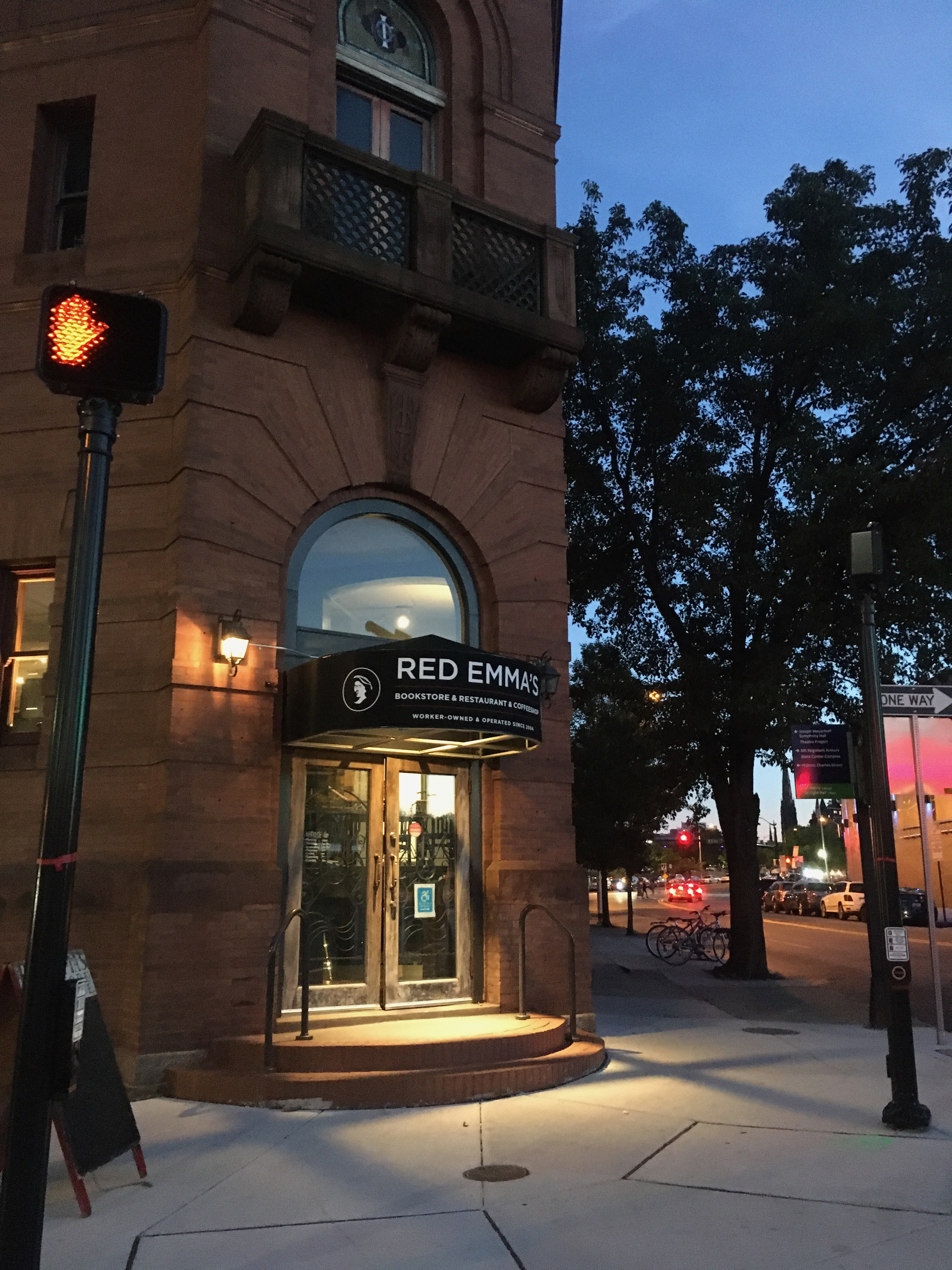
- Red Emma's Cathedral Street location
- 39°19′37.2″N 76°36′34.5″W
- Location: Baltimore, Maryland, United States
- Type: Bookstore, Vegan Restaurant
- Established: 2004

Other information
- Website: redemmas.org

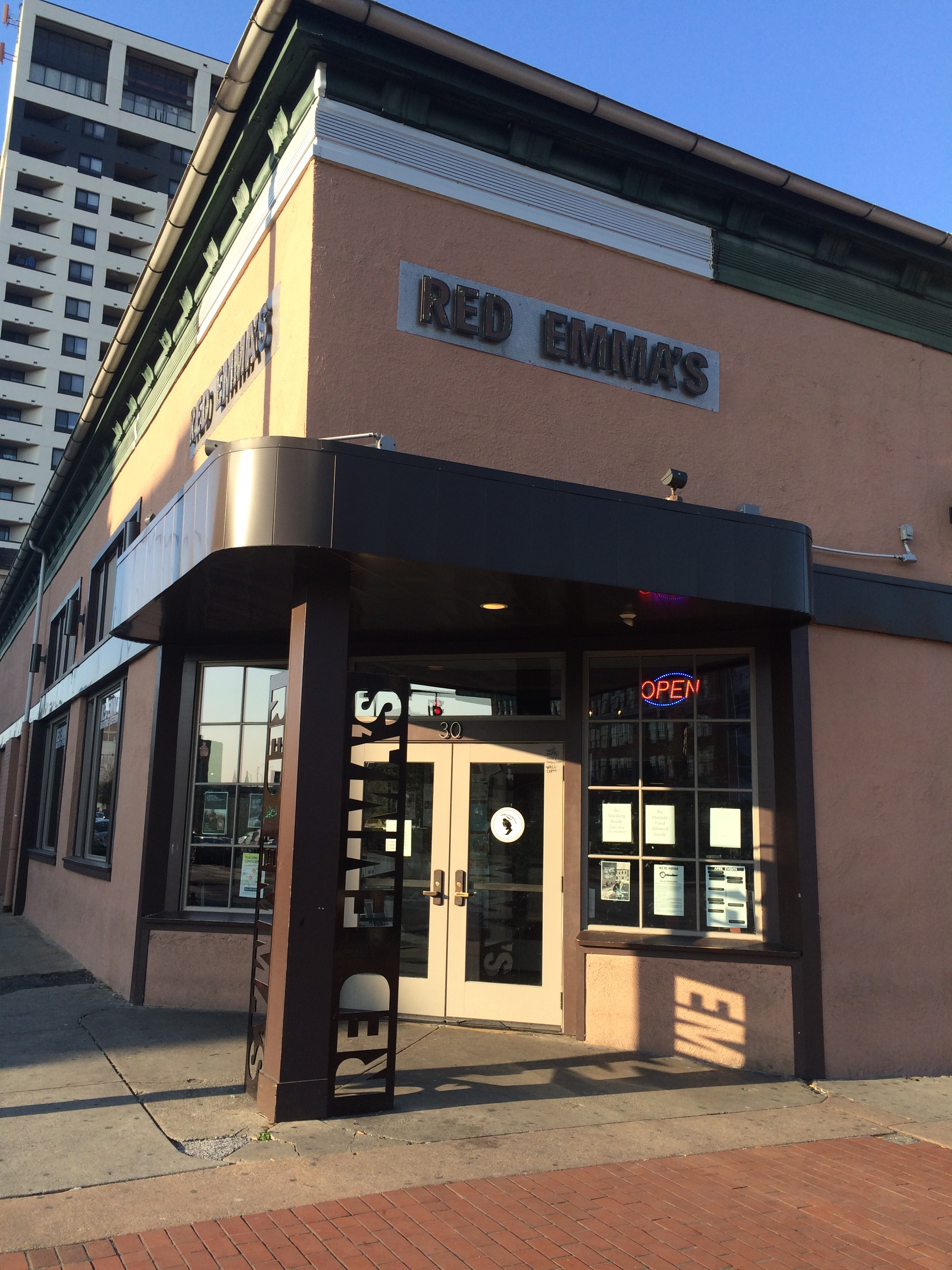
Red Emma's previous location on North Ave

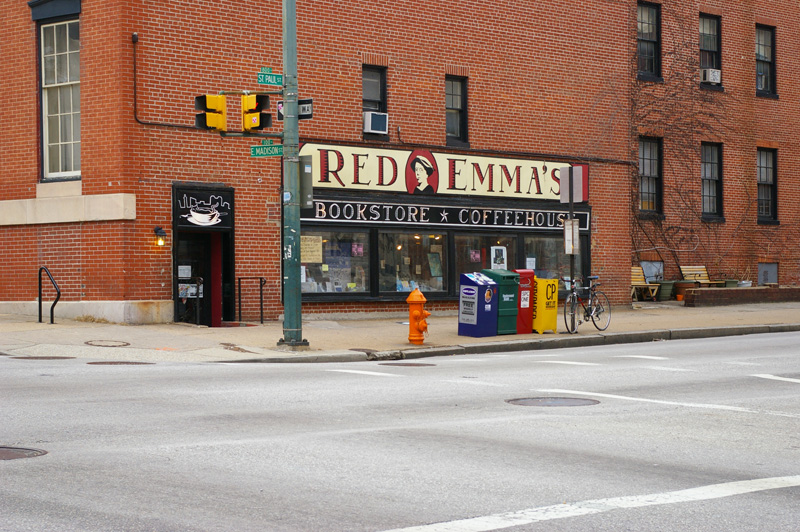
Former exterior of Red Emma's

Red Emma's Bookstore Coffeehouse is a radical infoshop in Baltimore, Maryland, United States. Run by a worker-owner collective, Red Emma's sells fair trade coffee, vegan foods and books. It also provides free computer access to the Baltimore community, wireless internet and film screenings, political teach-ins, and community events.

== History ==
Named for anarchist Emma Goldman, Red Emma's was formed in 2004 by a collective that included Johns Hopkins University graduate students John Duda and Kate Khatib and bookseller Cullen Nawalkowsky, who had closed a Fells Point district infoshop, Black Planet Books, the previous year due to declining business.

Red Emma's first location was at 800 St. Paul Street in the Mount Vernon neighborhood. In 2013, it formed a relationship with Thread, a year-old coffeehouse, and moved to 30 W. North Avenue in the Station North neighborhood. In 2018, it moved to 1225 Cathedral Street in the Midtown neighborhood. In April 2021, it was announced that they would purchase and move into two buildings in the Waverly neighborhood of Baltimore, at 415 E. 32nd Street and 3128 Greenmount Avenue. The Waverly location opened in October 2022.

== 2640 ==
In March 2007, Red Emma's joined St. John's United Methodist Church to form 2640, "a noncommercial, cooperatively managed space for radical politics and grassroots culture." The organization manages the church at 2640 Saint Paul Street in the Charles Village neighborhood. In addition to Sunday services, the facility is used as a community space.
