= Really Free School =

Collective organising squatted free schools in London in 2011

The Really Free School
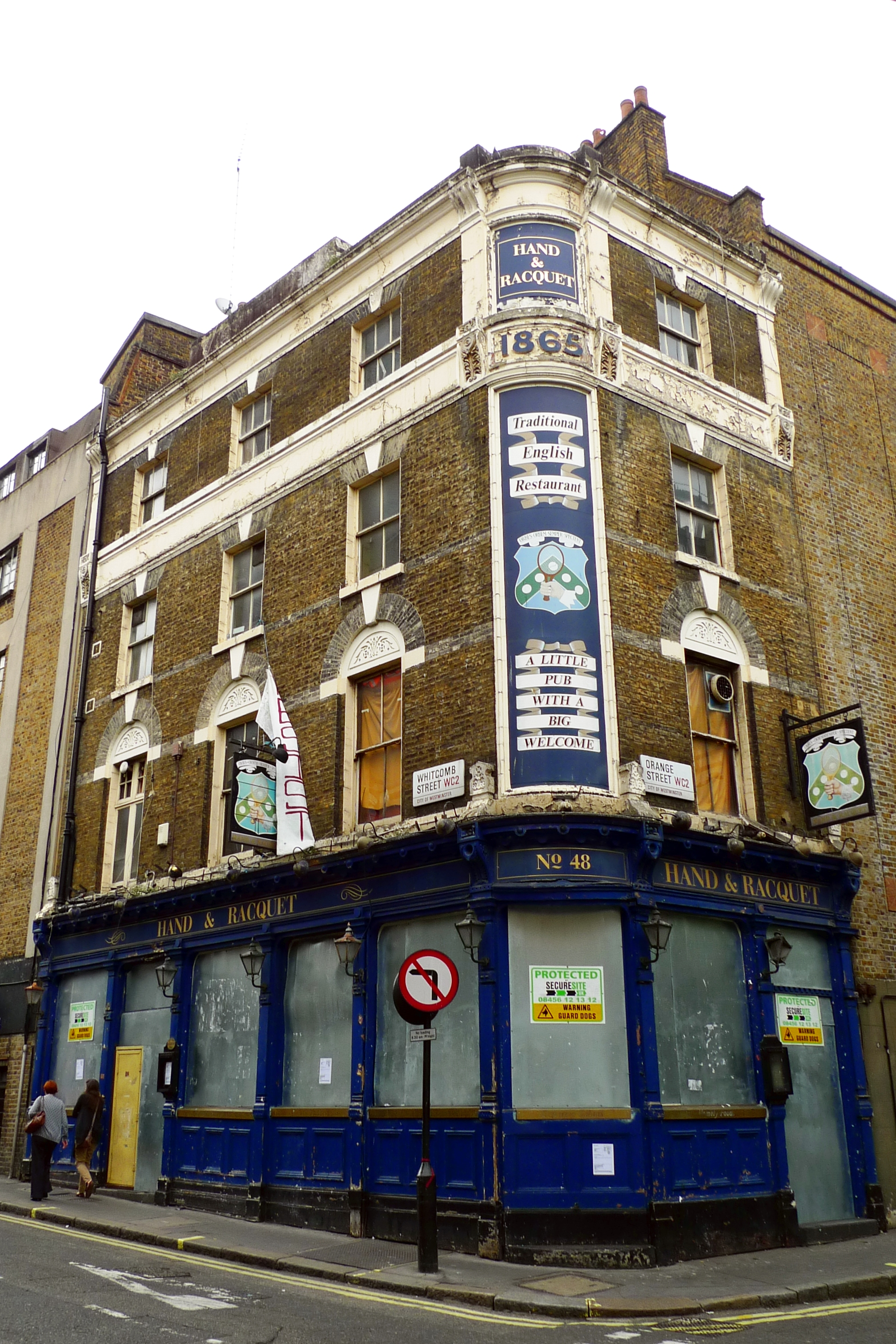
- Hand and Racquet before occupation
- Abbreviation: RFS
- Formation: 2011
- Founded at: 5 Bloomsbury Square, WC1A 2LX, London
- Type: Social centre
- Website: web.archive.org/web/20120422072346/http://reallyfreeschool.org/

The Really Free School was a learning collective that gained notoriety after squatting in a series of buildings in central London in 2011 with the intention of using them as "free schools." They organised lectures and workshops, stating "in this space, aside from the fact that you will not spend one penny inside these doors, you can also come and engage in a collective learning process directed by your own desires, ideas, questions and problems."

== Bloomsbury ==
The first squatted free school was at 5 Bloomsbury Square in central London, close to University College London and Birkbeck College. Speakers included Paul Mason. The name "Really Free School" was intended to mock the contemporaneous interest from the Conservative Party (ruling the country in the Cameron–Clegg coalition) in free schools. The owner of the property, Peter Nahum, said that the squatters were "essentially nice, middle-class kids, who would go and wash at friends' flats nearby." He complained that it cost a lot of money to evict them and asked "Why have a free school in central London? Why not go to the poorer districts if you want to educate people?"

== Fitzrovia ==
The second occupation was at 34–35 Fitzroy Square, two adjoining townhouses owned by film-maker Guy Ritchie which had previously been a language school. When Ritchie sued for possession, the group attended the court wearing Vinnie Jones masks (since Jones has appeared in several of Ritchie's films, including Lock, Stock and Two Smoking Barrels). District Judge Marc Dight was unimpressed by the squatters' defence, which was presented by a law student. He ordered the squatters to leave by the evening, so they organised a peaceful leaving party which spilled over into Fitzroy Square. The Fitzrovia News praised the squatters for making a stand against austerity cuts to education facilities.

== Later occupations ==
The group then occupied two pubs, firstly The Black Horse at 6 Rathbone Place and then The Hand & Racquet at 48 Whitcomb Street. The Black Horse was in Fitzrovia and received support from the Fitzrovia Neighbourhood Association when bailiffs attempted an illegal eviction. The Hand and Racquet was in central London, next to Leicester Square and behind the National Gallery. The Daily Telegraph wrote that "A ragtag bunch of up to 40 activists and undergraduates has exploited legal loopholes to live for free in a string of historic buildings in London. Dressed in scavenged clothes and ripped vintage tweed jackets, the squatters have struck four times in the past six weeks."

== See also ==
- 121 Centre
- Bank of Ideas
- Bloomsbury Social Centre
- London Action Resource Centre
- RampART
- Self-managed social centres in the United Kingdom
