= Bloomsbury Social Centre =

Short-lived self-managed project in London

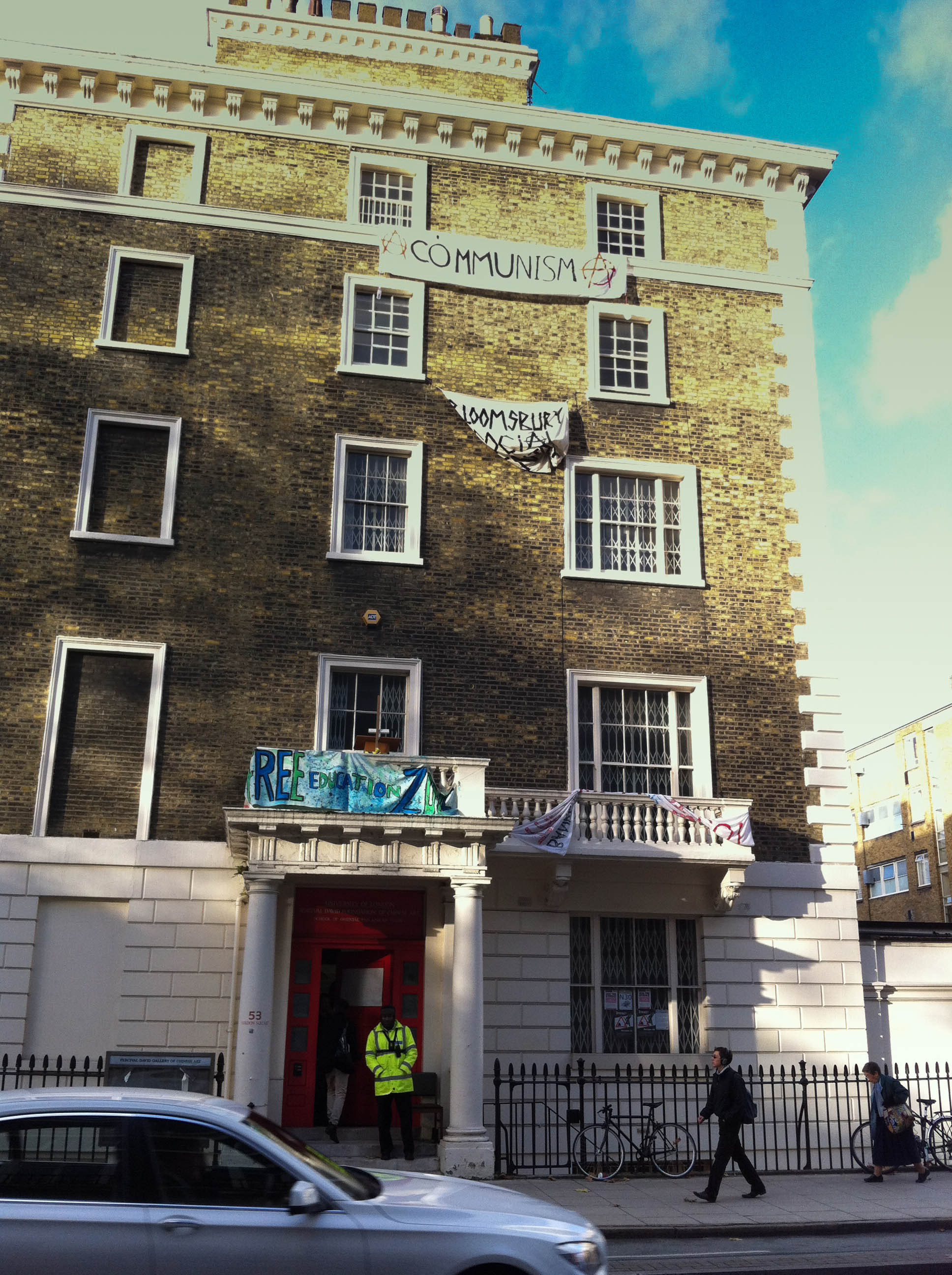

- Location within Greater London
- Address: 53 Gordon Square, London
- Coordinates: 051.524333°N 000.129667°W

Construction
- Opened: 23 November 2011
- Closed: 22 December 2011
- Architect: Charles Holden

Tenants
- School of Oriental and African Studies

Website
- bloomsburysocialcentre.wordpress.com

Bloomsbury Social Centre was an impromptu squat and social centre in Bloomsbury, London, which was squatted as a self-managed social centre by students in affiliation with Occupy London, and the global Occupy movement. It was formed on 23 November 2011, and evicted on 22 December, lasting a total of 30 days. It occupied 53 Gordon Square, a historic six-storey Georgian Grade II-listed building, the former home of the Percival David Collection, renovated by famous British architect, Charles Holden, the principal architect of nearby Senate House. 53 Gordon Square is now part of the Doctoral School.

== Occupation ==
The self-managed social centre was squatted by University of London students as an act protesting political issues of the day, including cuts to the national budget by the incumbent Conservative-Liberal Democrat Coalition government, the tripling of university tuition fee contribution caps in England and Wales, the wars in the Middle East, and, more generally, free market capitalism, the political right-wing, and neo-liberalism.

== Activities ==
The occupiers aimed to make Bloomsbury Social Centre an open-access space for the local community. Spare rooms could be booked online for unspecified use.

The space was used for open and closed events by book clubs, university societies, artists, musicians, actors, and students. It served as a space for meetings, discussions, drama and music rehearsals, art projects, and group work sessions. They also routinely organized nightly films ("Usually communist, always beautiful" - the last week included Salò, or the 120 Days of Sodom, Germany in Autumn and an unspecified film of Beckett's Endgame), open forum discussions, English and foreign language classes, international cuisine cooking classes, bicycle workshops and other less-frequent events, all of which were free.

They set up a small museum on the first floor, called the Museum of Neo-Liberalism, chronicling its rise and fall. An open-access library was set up on the fourth floor, with a focus on radical left-wing literature. The public were encouraged to read and work there.

== Eviction ==
The building was leased by School of Oriental and African Studies (SOAS) from the University of London, on a 99 year lease, for £1.2 million, intending to double research space, which was achieved by 2013 after additional cost of £2.3million on refurbishment. The occupiers were aware that legal proceedings were being taken, but appeared to think that eviction could be avoided, writing to SOAS on 14 December 2011:

While you have claimed that you will suffer financial damages from our continued use of the building, this should be weighed against the political damages you may suffer in consequence of an eviction.

SOAS responded to the occupation of the building by acquiring a possession order, presumably on 15 December 2011.

Five occupiers were evicted by bailiffs around 6 a.m. on 22 December 2011.

== See also ==
- Bank of Ideas
- RampART
- Really Free School
- St Agnes Place
