= BASE (social centre) =

Self-managed social centre in Bristol, UK

- Interactive map of the BASE area
- Former names: Kebele Social Centre; Kebele Kulture Projekt

General information
- Status: Self-managed social centre
- Location: 14 Robertson Road, Easton, Bristol, BS5 6JY, Bristol, United Kingdom
- Coordinates: 51.4696°N 2.5629°W
- Opened: 1995
- Owner: BASE Community Co-op

Website
- basebristol.org

Base for Anarchy & Solidarity in Easton, commonly known as BASE, is an anarchist community co-operative and self-managed social centre in Easton, Bristol, England. Formerly known as Kebele, the building was squatted in 1995.

== History ==
BASE, previously named Kebele, was squatted in 1995. The squatters resisted eviction attempts and negotiated with the owner (a bank), forming a housing co-operative which then bought the building for £19,000 in 1997. By 2008, the centre had paid off its mortgage and had become a community co-operative.

== Name ==
The original name, Kebele, was based on the Amharic word used by Rastafarians in the Grenada Revolution of 1973 to refer to the community centres that were the focus of resistance. It became known as BASE (Base for Anarchy & Solidarity in Easton) from March 2018 onwards. The reason given for the name change was that "it no longer felt appropriate to be called Kebele" because no-one involved in the project at that time "had links to Ethiopia", and "to make it clearer that we are an anarchist social centre".

== Activities ==
BASE is organised by collectives which take responsibility for certain activities, such as the bicycle workshop, cafe, infoshop, finance and radical library. All participants are volunteers and the cafe is organised on a donation basis. BASE is part of a network of self-managed social centres in the United Kingdom which includes The 1 in 12 Club in Bradford, the Cowley Club in Brighton and the Sumac Centre in Nottingham.
