= Wapping Autonomy Centre =

English 1980s self-managed social centre

Coordinates: 51.50658°N 0.0527°W

Wapping Autonomy Centre (also known as The Anarchist Centre) was a self-managed social centre in Wapping from late 1981 to 1982. The project was initially funded by money raised by the benefit single Persons Unknown/Bloody Revolutions, as well as benefit gigs by Crass and The Poison Girls.

== Project ==
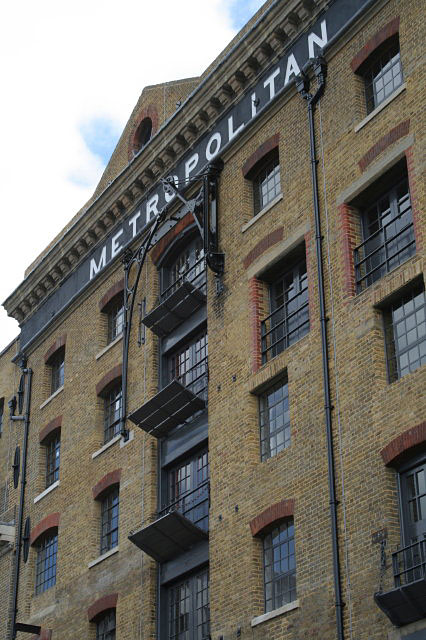
Metropolitan Wharf, former home of the Wapping Autonomy Centre

The centre was set up in a rented space in Metropolitan Wharf, Wapping in 1981. The initial costs were paid using funds raised from a benefit single. It was a split single composed of Persons Unknown by The Poison Girls and Bloody Revolutions by Crass.

The warehouse had been suggested by Andy Martin from the anarchist Little A printers who worked in the building. Like later squatted centres, it had no alcohol or music licences.

== Activities ==
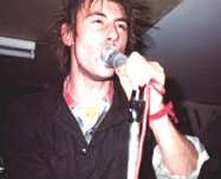
Crass lead singer Steve Ignorant performing at the Autonomy Centre in 1981

During its short lifespan, the Autonomy Centre became an important focal point for the anarcho-punk movement in the UK and Europe. Most of those involved with the project were anarchists who participated in protests and direct action against targets such as vivisection laboratories, the meat industry and the policies of then Prime Minister Margaret Thatcher. The Kill Your Pet Puppy collective organised events. Some of the bands that regularly played at the centre included Anthrax, The Apostles, Cold War, Conflict, Rudimentary Peni. Hagar the Womb were formed in the toilets.

Albert Meltzer records that the centre was "Ronan Bennett's brainchild." He goes on to say that "the punk support, especially from followers of Crass and Poison Girls, was substantial. Punk has lasted a couple of decades, long outlasting the proposed club. With the punks' money came the punks, and in the first week they had ripped up every single piece of furniture carefully bought, planned and fitted, down to the lavatory fittings that had been installed by Ronan from scratch, and defaced our own and everyone else's wall for blocks around. In the excitement of the first gigs where they could do as they liked, they did as they liked and wrecked the place. Loss of club, loss of money, loss of effort. End of story."

The centre eventually folded when the benefit parties failed to pay the rent.

== Legacy ==
Many of those involved with the centre went on to become active at the Centro Iberico, a squatted project with similar aims and ethos in west London.

The centre also inspired other squatted self-managed projects in London such as the Ambulance Station on Old Kent Road, Molly's Café on Upper Street and the Bingo Hall (now the Garage) at Highbury Corner.

Penny Rimbaud from Crass commented "It was a good try. We’d made all this money to defend Persons Unknown and it wasn’t needed. I think it was something in the region of ten grand, which was a lot of money in those days."

== See also ==
- Self-managed social centres in the United Kingdom
- 1 in 12 Club
- 121 Centre
- ABC No Rio
- St Agnes Place
- Warzone Collective
