= House of Brag =

Defunct London queer collective

House of Brag was a queer collective which organised four self-managed social centres in London between 2012 and 2014.

== History ==
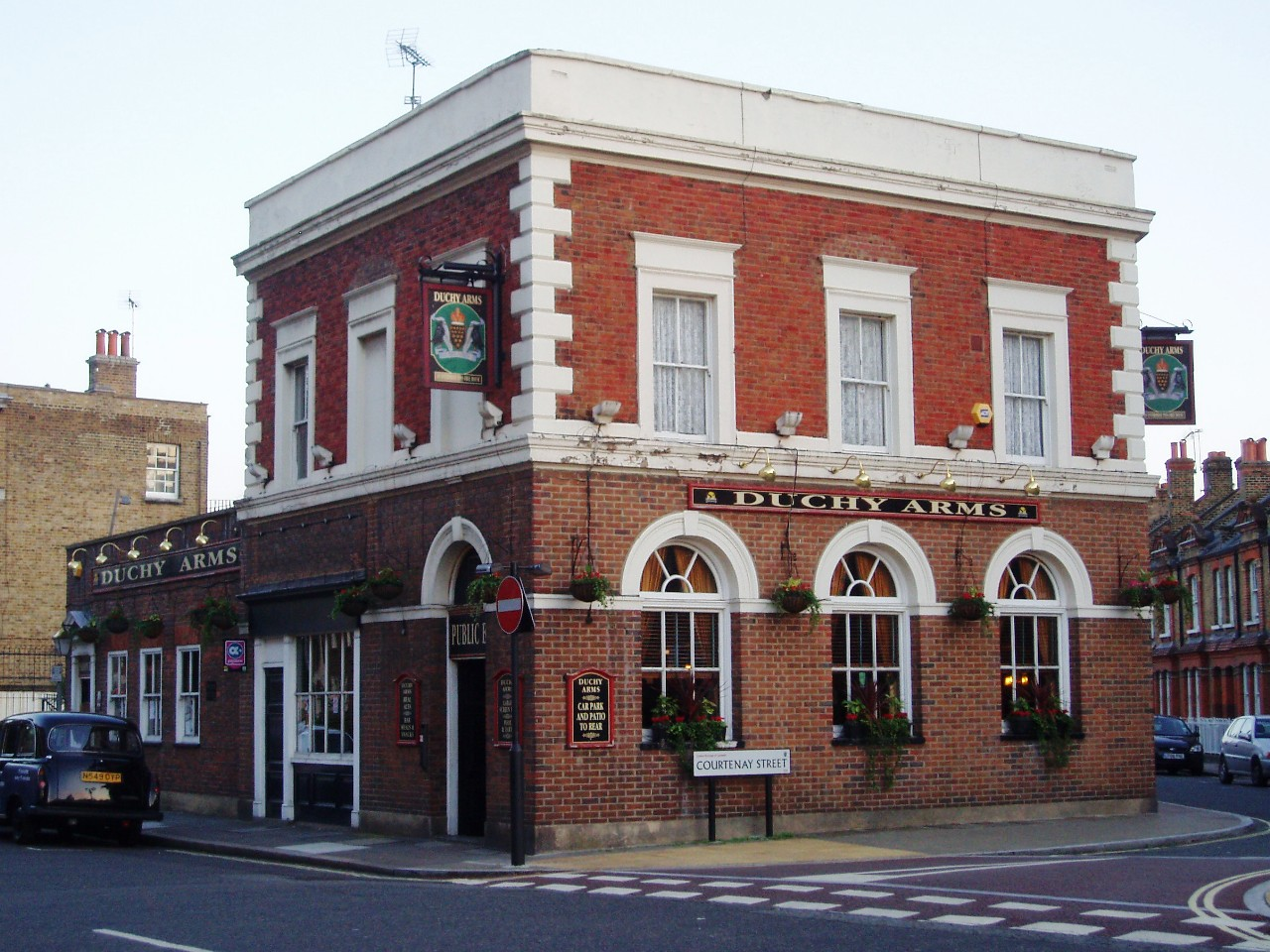
The pub at 63 Sancroft Street squatted in 2013 by the collective (pictured when still a pub in 2008)

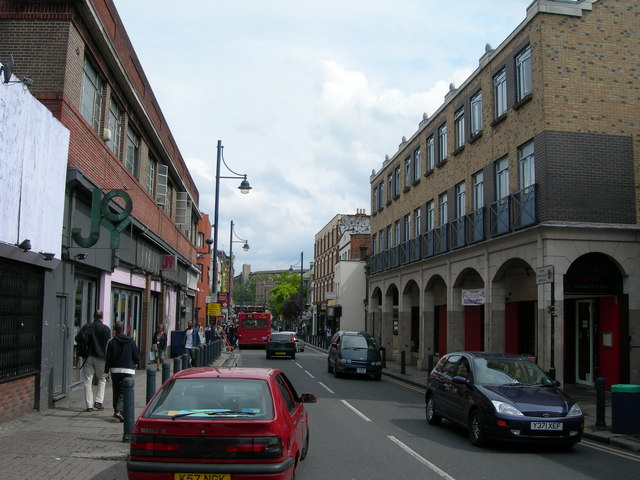
The former location of clothes retailer Joy (building on left side of photo) was squatted in 2014

In 2012, queer anarchist squatters came together to organise the London Queer Social Centre. The first iteration took place in a derelict community centre at 42 Braganza Street in Kennington, South London. The nascent collective took its name from the street in an echo of the House of Braganza. The self-managed social centre followed in the tradition of other squats in London such as the Bank of Ideas, the 121 Centre and rampART. It put on events with a queer focus such as dinners, talks and events. It was evicted on 13 November 2012, and the second iteration was occupied in December at 36 Carlisle Lane on the South Bank. This lasted until early 2013 and the third centre was squatted on 22 June 2013 in a former pub at 63 Sancroft Street in Kennington, then evicted on 6 July 2013. The collective had chosen to make the occupation a time-limited event to circumvent the anticipated eviction.

The fourth London Queer Social Centre was squatted by the House of Brag a year later in Coldharbour Lane in Brixton, on 27 June 2014. The occupation was designed to clash with the London pride parade, which the House of Brag criticised as having betrayed its roots. The collective declared their "Monstrous Pride" social centre would go back to gay pride's "militant, intersectional roots – but with new ideas as well". The building's water and electricity connections were turned off and one member of the collective was arrested by Metropolitan Police officers for attempting to turn the water back on at the street. The police were concerned that the building would be used for a rave. The collective adapted to the difficulties by cooking food at other squats and asking bands to play acoustic sets. Participants used the toilets and internet at the nearby Ritzy Cinema. This last London Queer Social Centre was evicted in July 2014. The same year, a member of the collective presented a film called Brixton Fairies: Made Possible by Squatting at the Wotever DIY Film Festival documenting the queer history of squatting in 1980s Brixton.
