= Spike Surplus Scheme =

Self-managed project in South London 1999-2009

Coordinates: 51.4706°N 0.0637°W

The Spike Surplus Scheme was a community-run self-managed social centre in a squatted building in Peckham, South London. It was occupied in 1999 and provided a range of mostly free activities for local people until its eviction in 2009 by Southwark Council.

== Occupation ==
The Spike Surplus Scheme was established in 1999 when a fly-tipped, vandalised site at 39b Consort Road in the London Borough of Southwark was squatted. The building had in the past been a doss-house or "spike" (a shelter of last resort) serving the unemployed, homeless, and urban poor for over a century. At the time of the occupation, the exterior grounds had been used for fly-tipping. On arrival, the members of the scheme immediately cleared them using a JCB digger.

== Activities ==
The social centre provided rehearsal/recording facilities, health/martial arts space and a community garden. Running on a "do it yourself" and free-where-possible or donations level, the facilities were used by a wide variety of local people. Other users were community garden permaculture groups, martial arts, and various alternative therapy groups. Alongside other squatted projects such as 121 Centre, 491 Gallery, 56a Infoshop and RampART, the Spike developed into an alternative institution promoting social movements and local initiatives.

== Eviction ==
Having established a peppercorn rent contract, Southwark Council decided not to renew the contract in 2008, giving the centre until September 26 to raise £440,000 to buy the plot.

Despite various fundraising drives, including selling 'Peckham diamonds' which were bits of glass from broken car windows filed down and sold in plastic wallets, the centre was unable to buy the site. In December 2008, the council gave notice of eviction, saying they would give two weeks' notice of the actual date. The centre was then evicted without notice on 12 February 2009. People were forced to negotiate with bailiffs to regain musical equipment.

== See also ==
- Homelessness in the United Kingdom
- Self-managed social centres in the United Kingdom
- St Agnes Place
