= Veggies of Nottingham =

Vegan catering campaign and worker co-operative in Nottingham, England

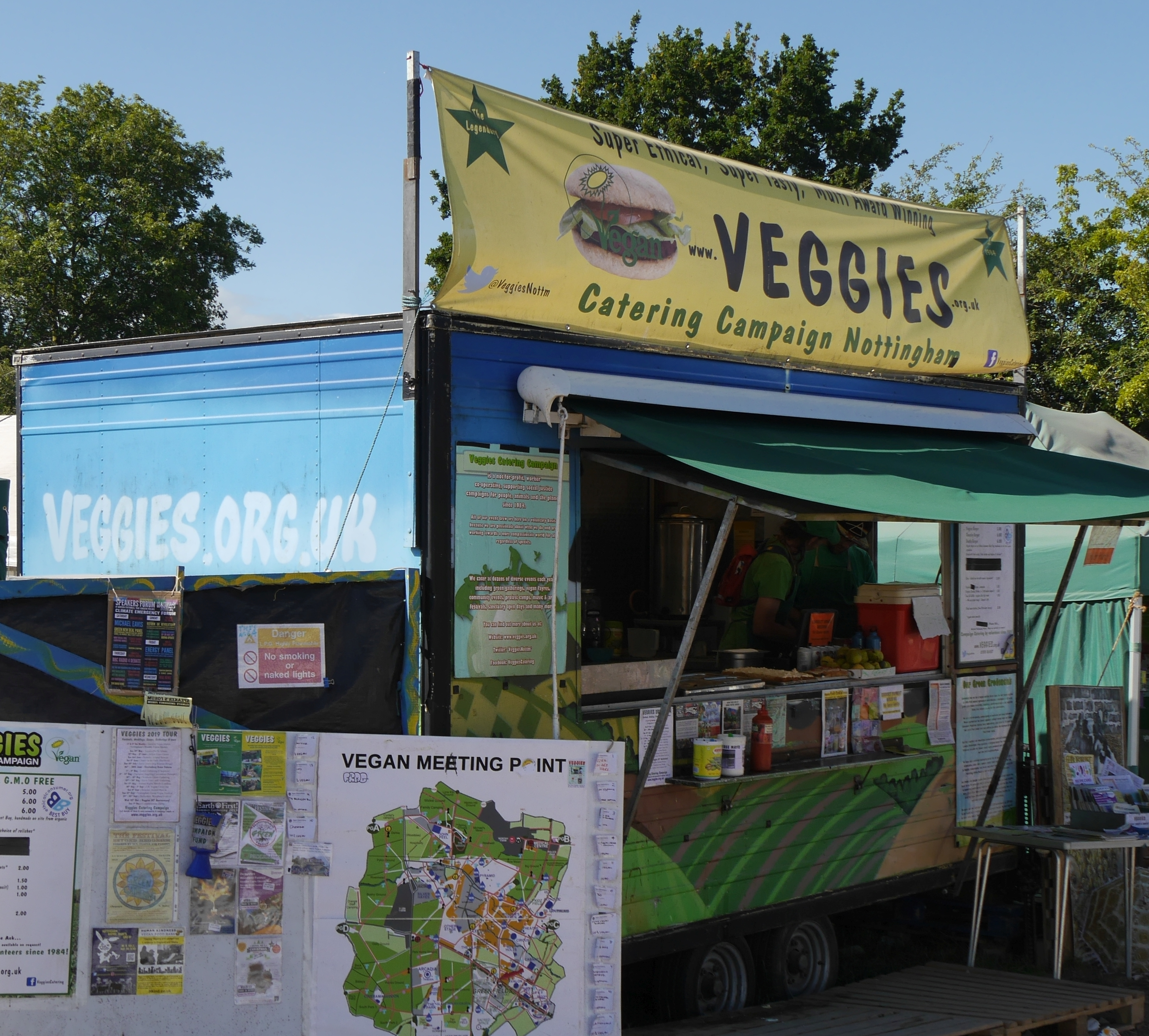
Veggies of Nottingham, Glastonbury Festival, 2019

Veggies of Nottingham, also known as Veggies Catering Campaign, is a worker co-operative and a campaigning group based in Nottingham, England, promoting ethical alternatives to mainstream fast food. It does this by hosting events such as the annual East Midlands Vegan Festival, publishing books and leaflets, and maintaining an extensive website, including a Contacts Directory of groups with similar aims. As a non-profit worker co-operative it also provides affordable, wholesome, minimally-packaged vegan catering at a wide range of events and protests using fair trade, organic and/or locally sourced ingredients.

== Background ==
Veggies were set up in 1984 by seven animal rights activists who were frustrated at the lack of vegetarian fast food available at the time. They began by selling veggieburgers to the public from a mobile stall, later also providing locally baked pasties and cakes, and other foods and drinks. The co-op has since gone on to provide both snacks and full cooked meals for many thousands of people at peace movement marches, animal rights demonstrations, festivals, protest camps and reclaim the streets events.

From 1985, Veggies were based at the Rainbow Centre in Nottingham city. They later took on the day-to-day running of the centre. In 2001 this relocated into the Forest Fields area of the city and was renamed the Sumac Centre, part of the emerging UK Social Centre Network.

== Projects ==
There have been many other campaigns and projects set up or supported by past and present Veggies members and volunteers, including Samosas for Social Change (supporting, amongst others, the charity Vegfam and Food Not Bombs' Hurricane Katrina appeal), the Vegan Business Connection, the all-vegan bakery, Screaming Carrot, and vegan catering projects in other towns.

Veggies has been reported to have a "vast and extensive internet capability", used for networking on issues affecting human rights, animal rights, environmental protection, anti-militarism and social justice. Veggies is dedicated to furthering the aims of the campaigning community, with links to organisations such as Amnesty International, Greenpeace and Friends of the Earth, although, they increasingly campaign on a more grassroots level, rather than relying on the resources of (inter)national organisations. From 1987 to 1996, and through to the present day, Veggies has been closely associated with the McLibel Campaign and London Greenpeace, continuing to help with the co-ordination of Days of Action and the distribution of campaign resources.

The publications of the Movement for Compassionate Living, promoting simple living, are printed and distributed by Veggies, who also act as local contacts for Animal Aid, The Vegan Society, the Vegetarian Society and Viva!.

== Awards and criticism ==
In 2004, Direct Action Against Apathy zine called Veggies "...probably the best vegan catering outfit on the planet".

List of awards:

- 2006 - Vegan Society - Best Vegan Catering

== See also ==
- List of animal rights groups

== See also ==
- List of vegetarian and vegan organizations
