= Autonomous Centre of Edinburgh =

Self-managed social centre in Edinburgh, Scotland

- Predecessor: Edinburgh Unemployed Workers Centre
- Formation: 1997; 29 years ago
- Type: Infoshop and autonomous social centre
- Headquarters: Edinburgh, Scotland, UK
- Website: autonomous.org.uk

The Autonomous Centre of Edinburgh, also known as ACE, is an infoshop and autonomous social centre in Edinburgh, Scotland. It was founded in 1997, although it follows on from previous groups.

== History ==
ACE formed out of the Edinburgh Unemployed Workers Centre of the 1980s, which was originally a non-partisan council office, which later split from the council when it became increasingly politicised due to the struggles of the period such as resistance to the poll tax. Glaswegian writer James Kelman gave a speech at the opening of the Edinburgh Unemployed Workers Centre which is featured in Kelman's book And the Judges said. Kelman has publicly expressed support for ACE.

== Setting up ==
In a flyer circulated in 1996, ACE stated the following aims for the project:

- Advice and solidarity against dole harassment
- A meeting place for community-political groups
- Radical books, 'zines, and information
- A low-cost vegan cafe and drop-in centre
- Local arts and crafts
- Underground records, demos, t-shirts, badges
- People's food co-operative
- Socialising in an anti-sexist, -racist, or -homophobic environment
- An epicentre of alternative/DIY kulture (Spelling and emphasis in original.)

== 2000s ==
In 2000 the following groups were using the centre: Autonomous Women of Edinburgh, Angry Youth, Edinburgh Animal Rights, Youth Solidarity Group, the Mutiny Collective and Prisoners’ Support, May Day Edinburgh, anti-terrorism bill. In 2005, the groups were as follows: Stop the War (Edinburgh), Campaign for Nuclear Disarmament (Scotland), Independent Media Centre Scotland, No War but the Class War, Peace Camp, the A701 Protest Camp (the Bilston Glen antibypass campaign).

The revolutionary, class struggle anarchist news sheet Counter Information was based in the centre.

== Recent events ==
In 2014 those involved with the ACE collective produced the statement "From Yes to Action", an attempt to understand the political context after the failed Scottish independence referendum.

In 2016 ACE supported University of Edinburgh students who occupied Charles Stewart House demanding divestment.

ACE is a founding member of Action Against Austerity.

In 2022, ACE moved out of its West Montgomery Place premises, and as of 2023 was without permanent premises.

== See also ==
- The 1 in 12 Club
- Cowley Club
- Edinburgh Coalition Against Poverty
- London Action Resource Centre
- Sumac Centre
- Warzone Collective
