= Radical bookshops in the United Kingdom =

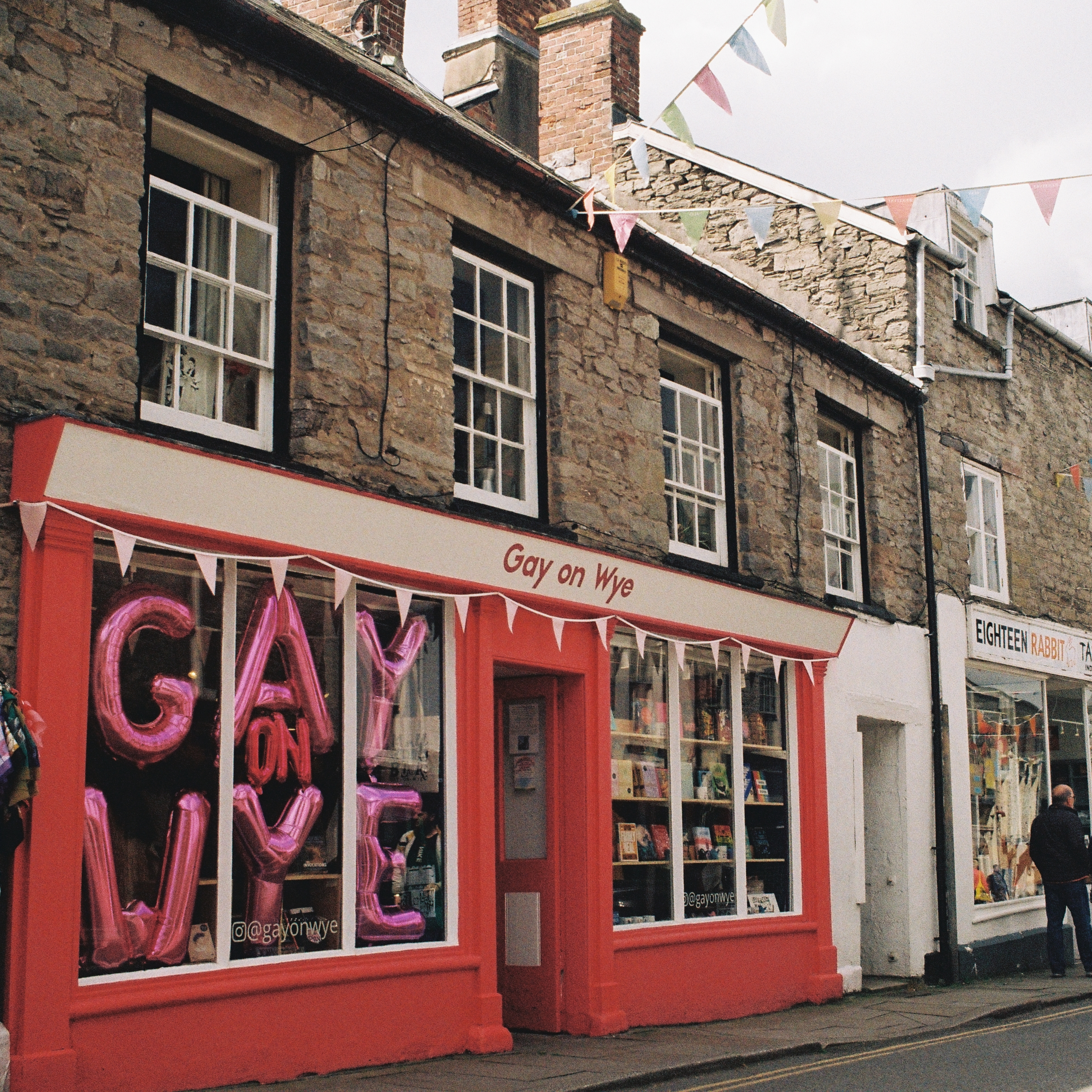
Gay on Wye, a Queer bookshop in Hay on Wye, Wales.

Radical bookshops in the United Kingdom offer and promote activist and countercultural literature for browsing and purchase on topics including animal rights, environmentalism, postcolonialism, self-help, and sexual politics. The shops also serve as venues for activist meetups, book launches, lectures, and other events for similarly inclined people to discuss social issues.

== History ==
In the 1980s, there were about 80 radical bookshops in the United Kingdom, which The Guardian described as the prime age of radical bookshops.

The Federation of Radical Booksellers was set up in the 1980s to support radical bookshops but has dissolved. The contemporary Alliance of Radical Booksellers has about 40 members.

Despite a rapid decline in independent bookshops leading into 2010, rising grassroots activism from climate activism, the antiglobalisation movement, the green movement, and the feminist movement contributed to resurgent interest in radical bookshops. Amazon and other large book retailers drove down book prices with their purchasing power, putting independent bookshops at a price disadvantage and offering radical titles that once were confined to smaller bookshops. There were six radical/alternative bookshops in the Booksellers Association as of 2010: Bookmarks, Housmans, News from Nowhere, October Books, Radish, and Word Power (later Lighthouse) Books. Housmans launched an online bookseller in 2010. The anarchist publisher Freedom Press and cafe co-op Cowley Club both have bookshops where anarchists and Greens congregate.

== Feminist bookshops ==
Bookshops had previously functioned as important locations for the former Edwardian women's movement during the push for suffrage. During the Women's Liberation Movement, organisations including Women in Libraries, Women in Publishing, and Women in Booktrades organised conferences and meetings to support the development of women's print culture in the United Kingdom. Existent radical bookshops in Britain began to stock feminist works as the Women's Liberation Movement developed. The feminist bookshops WomanZone (Edinburgh) and Sisterwrite and Silver Moon (London) supported this.

Early feminist bookshops required significant investment in the form of labour and capital. For instance Sisterwrite, an Islington feminist bookshop that opened in 1978, began with £16,000 invested by donors, and its staff did not pay themselves at all for the first year. Funding from the Arts and Recreation Committee, the GLC Women's Committee, The Greater London Council, and The Arts Council was "extremely important" in facilitating and supporting the operations and activities of early feminist bookshops across the United Kingdom.

In November 2018, The Second Shelf, which sells modern first editions, rare books, manuscripts, and rediscovered works by women, opened in Soho. Its founder, A.N. Devers, was prompted by her experiences attending antiquarian book fairs and being frustrated by the over emphasis on male authors, and noticing the different treatment and valuation of books by male authors as opposed to their women counterparts.

In 2019, several feminist bookshops opened including the since closed Pages of Cheshire Street which supported work by women, trans, and gender-diverse writers, alongside the Black Feminist Bookshop, and the also now closed Feminist Bookshop in Brighton.

== Queer bookshops ==
Prior to the decriminalisation of homosexuality in 1967, booksellers in the United Kingdom had to operate informally and through clandestine means, for example Lavender Menace Bookshop in Edinburgh (the second LGBTQ+ bookshop to open in the UK) began by selling works from a bookstall in the cloakroom of a gay nightclub. Early LGBTQ+ bookshops in the United Kingdom were targeted by state repression, including having stock seized by customs as it was being important and facing raids of their premises.

Gay's the Word was opened in London in 1979, making it the oldest LGBTQ+ bookshop in the UK. Following decades in which closures affected many bookstores, radical and mainstream, in the 2010s Gay's the Word was the United Kingdom's only remaining LGBTQ+ bookshop. As of 2023, there were more than a dozen LGBTQ+ specific bookshops with many others hosting dedicated sections for LGBTQ+ works. Examples include The Common Press, a non-profit queer intersectional cafe and bookshop in Shoreditch, the long-established Gay's The Word in Bloomsbury, The Old Queeriosity Shop in Plymouth, and the Gay Pride Shop/The LGBTQ+ Bookshop in Manchester.

Queer bookshops have been intentionally founded as community hubs and sites where LGBTQ+ persons and activist groups in the United Kingdom can find support and representation. For instance the founder of Gay on Wye, a Queer bookshop in Hay on Wye, remarked on its 2023 opening that he hopes it becomes "a vibrant hub for the community and allies" and that beyond being "a commercial venture" it is also "a celebration of the LGBTQ+ community's history, struggles and achievements".

== Black-owned independent bookshops ==
In recent years several Black-owned bookshops and publishers have emerged in the United Kingdom, reflecting a response to the prevalent whiteness of the UK publishing and bookselling industries. A 2025 Booksellers' Association survey reported that only 7% of UK surveyed booksellers belong to a non-white ethnic minority group. The 2022 UK Publishing Workforce Diversity Inclusion and Belonging report circulated by the Publishers' Association found that representation of ethnic minority groups (excluding white minorities) in UK publishing jobs had increased from 12% in 2018 to 18% in 2022.

New Beacon Books (London), founded in 1966, is the UK's first and oldest Black bookshop and publisher. John La Rose and his partner Sarah White founded New Beacon Books after meeting through the anti-apartheid campaign in the 1960s. They initially ran it from their home in Finsbury Park. New Beacon Books moved out of the couple's front room and became established on Stroud Green Road in 1973, where it has operated ever since. New Beacon Books supported antiracist activity in the UK through projects such as its Caribbean Artists Movement, and operated as a meeting place for people involved in the civil rights movement.

Other Black-owned independent bookshops in the UK include Sevenoaks Bookshop, Round Table Books, Pepukayi Books, Books of Africa, and No Ordinary Bookshop. Other initiatives include web-only, subscription-based, and travelling bookshops, such as Book Love, Afrori Books, and Imagine Me Stories.

== In London ==
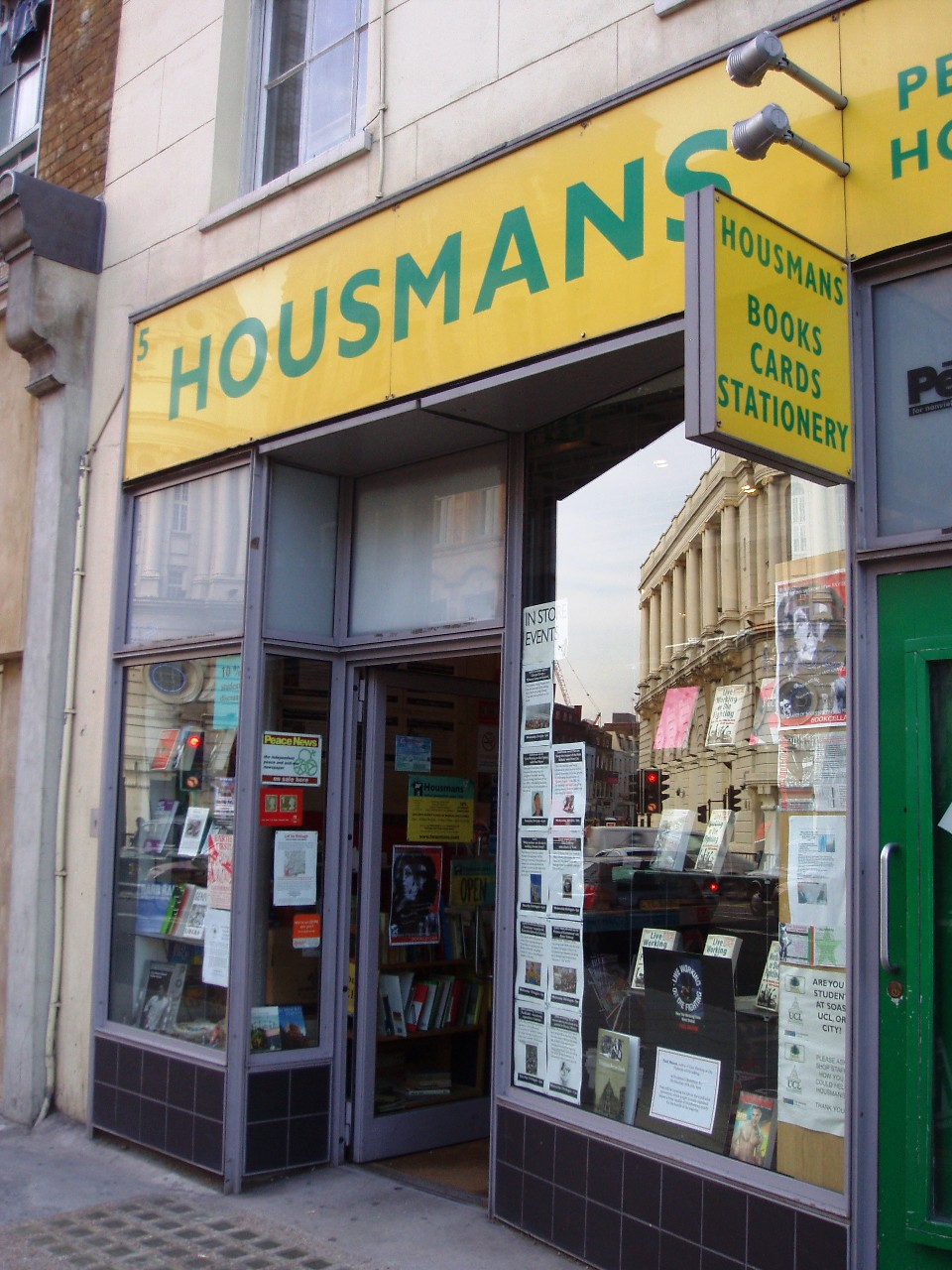
Housmans, a bookshop in London

The Alliance of Radical Booksellers lists fourteen members across London including: Freedom Press in Whitechapel; Letterbox Library in Stratford; Housmans in King's Cross and the nearby Quaker Centre Bookshop; New Beacon Books in Finsbury Park; Round Table Books in Brixton; Shalimar Books in Lambeth; Gay's The Word and Bookmarks in Bloomsbury; The Second Shelf in Highgate; Books on The Rise in Richmond Hill; 56a Infoshop in Walworth; Newham Bookshop in Newham; and Calder Bookshop in Southbank.

Over time, radical bookshops in London have faced state repression, vandalism, and targeted violence. This includes incidents where Gay's The Word was raided by Customs and Excise, Centerprise bookshop in Dalston being twice petrol-bombed in the 1970s, and Black bookshops Bogle-L'Ouverture and New Beacon Books being graffitied and damaged by vandals. In 2018, far-right protestors chanting fascist songs attacked Bookmarks Bookshop following a "Make Britain Great Again" protest. Reportedly, one of the "attackers ransacking the shop wore a Donald Trump mask". Members of Parliament David Lammy and Rupa Huq condemned the attack. The incident led to the suspension of UK Independence Party members Elizabeth Jones, Luke Nash-Jones and Martin Costello by the party.

== Other forms of circulation ==
Beyond selling literature through bookshops, radical literature is distributed, traded, and sold through bookfairs, stalls at protests and gatherings, and informal networks. Anarchist, feminist, or otherwise radical bookfairs are held in Sheffield, Glasgow, Edinburgh, London, Newcastle, Bristol, Manchester, Peterborough, Dorset, and Hull.

== List ==
- Bookhaus, Bristol
- Bookmarks, Bloomsbury
- Central Books, London
- Collet's, London (closed 1993)
- Compendium Books, London (closed)
- Cowley Club, Brighton
- Five Leaves, Nottingham
- Freedom, London
- Frontline, Leicester
- Grass Roots, Manchester (closed in 1990)
- Greenleaf, Bristol (closed)
- Housmans, London
- Mushroom, Nottingham (closed 2000)
- News From Nowhere, Liverpool
- October Books, Southampton
- People's Bookshop, Durham
- Radish, Leeds
- Silver Moon Bookshop, London (closed in 2001)
- Wedge, Coventry
- Lighthouse, Edinburgh
