= Edinburgh Coalition Against Poverty =

Edinburgh Coalition Against Poverty also known as ECAP, is a left-wing organisation which aims to be a solidarity network for working-class people particularly the unemployed and disabled. It is independent from government and operates by direct democracy.

It is one of many similar claimants groups set up with similar political purposes.

ECAP's website hosts benefit advice and articles about the group's activities.

The group has frequently been involved in opposition to benefit sanctions, opposition to workfare and fighting for the right to be accompanied at jobcentres ECAP has drawn inspiration from the advocacy of the Scottish Unemployed Workers Network and supported their member Tony Cox during his trial.

ECAP have held presentations alongside speakers like Lynne Friedli and the IWW.

Its affiliate, Edinburgh Claimants has been acting as an independent advocacy group and claimants union since the 1980s as part of the Edinburgh Unemployed Workers Centre. It has been based at the autonomous centre of Edinburgh since 1997.

ECAP is a member of the Action Against Austerity network and signatory to "From Yes to Action"

The group is featured in the end credits of Ken Loach's film I Daniel Blake due to its role in helping script writer Paul Laverty with researching the film.

== See also ==
- Scottish Socialist Party
