= Sumac Centre =

Social centre in Nottingham, England

Coordinates: 52.971°N 1.163°W

The Sumac Centre in 2006

The Sumac Centre is a self-managed social centre in Nottingham, UK. It provides resources, meeting spaces and workshops for groups and individuals, and supports campaigning for human rights, animal rights, the environment, and peace. It is part of the UK Social Centre Network and the radical catering group Veggies is based at the centre. It receives no regular funding, the core groups each pay rent that goes toward the mortgage and running costs. Some of the groups are run by volunteers. Its origins can to traced to the Rainbow Centre, which was established in 1984.

== History ==
=== Rainbow Centre ===
In April 1984, a group of people based in Nottingham associated with the Environmental Fact Shop, Friends of the Earth (FoE) and the Campaign for Nuclear Disarmament (CND) founded the Rainbow Centre Co-operative. The following year in September the co-operative rented premises at 180 Mansfield Road and set up the Rainbow Centre which was focused on peace and environmental issues. In 1988, the FoE shop next door to the Rainbow Centre closed. The Rainbow Centre inherited some of the FoE literature and stock, which was added to the centre's library and shop. Veggies moved into the closed shop. They had started out by working from their members' homes, moving in meant they had their own kitchen. Veggies and the Rainbow Centre worked together, later Veggies took on the day-to-day running of the Rainbow Centre. In 1989, as the lease for the next door premises at Mansfield Road became available, the Rainbow Centre expanded its library, and once again opened a shop.

=== Sumac Centre ===
Volunteers fit new windows

The Rainbow Centre was in a row of buildings that was poorly maintained by the landlord. The rent and building condition were a drain on the collective's finances and enthusiasm. To resolve these problems, in Autumn 2000, the members of the Rainbow Centre and Veggies began to researching the possibility of buying a building of their own. In June 2001 they purchased, via a mortgage, a former Ukrainian social club in the Forest Fields, Nottingham. A year later, in June 2002, the renovation of the building was complete and the centre was reopened, having adopted the new name of the Sumac Centre.

The centre has a garden maintained by volunteers, a low budget venture which has been put together using recycled materials and donated plants, containers, pots etc.

In April 2024, the Sumac Centre celebrated its fortieth year (including Rainbow Centre) with a festival weekend.

== Activities ==
The Sumac Centre supports campaigning for human rights, animal rights, the environment, and peace. It is a secondary co-operative and a member of Radical Routes.

The Sumac Centre was one of the many organisations that undercover police officer Mark Kennedy infiltrated, between 2003 and 2010.

The NG7 Foodbank was based at the centre from mid 2012 until it closed at end of 2014. It closed partly due to NG7 Foodbank feeling that the council were using foodbanks as a long term strategy to avoid providing funds for welfare assistance.

== See also ==
- 1 in 12 Club
- Autonomous Centre of Edinburgh
- Cowley Club
- London Action Resource Centre
- Warzone Collective
