= Cowley Club =

Self-managed social centre in Brighton, England

Coordinates: 50°49′49.25″N 0°8′9.57″W

The Cowley Club
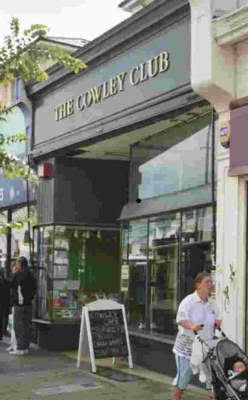
- The Cowley Club store front, 2004
- Type: Self-managed social centre
- Founded: 2003
- Headquarters: Brighton, Sussex, England, United Kingdom
- Services: Independent bookstore, café, members bar.
- Website: cowleyclub.org.uk

The Cowley Club is a left-libertarian self-managed social centre in Brighton, Sussex, England. It opened in 2003, providing resources and meeting spaces for groups and individuals active in areas such as workplace and unemployed struggles, international solidarity, animal liberation, ecological defence, feminist and queer activism and opposing the arms trade. Its political identity is close to anarchism or libertarian socialism. It also houses a vegan community café, a bookshop, and free English lessons for migrants.

The Cowley Club is named after local activist Harry Cowley and is part of the UK Social Centre Network. In their study of the radical social centre movement in the United Kingdom, academics Stuart Hodkinson and Paul Chatterton characterise the Cowley Club as a similar type of collective-ownership initiative to the London Action Resource Centre (LARC), "with the added dimension of a housing cooperative". Chatterton depicts the club as one of a number of resurgent social centres in the 2000s.

== History and organisation ==
The Cowley Club is a cooperative. As such, assets and control are collectively owned, the idea being that those using the centre share the responsibilities and work that comes with running it. The centre is collectively owned by "shareholders", and run as a base for those involved in grass-roots social change and those sympathetic to such activities. It is run entirely by volunteers – no-one is paid, and no private profit is made.

Funding was raised via a mortgage, loans from cooperative organisations such as Radical Routes, and loan-stock (loans made by individuals on a five-year basis). The building purchase was completed in February 2002, then the renovations began. Much of the property was in disrepair and volunteers worked to renovate it.

Volunteers are organised into groups to take on various aspects of running the centre – there are collectives for the café, bar, library, bookshop, mediation, cleaning, finances, maintenance and entertainments. There are monthly general meetings for overall co-ordinating, which have the ultimate responsibility for decisions taken.

According to a report in The Argus, the centre was intended to provide "cheap, wholesome food during the day and a member's bar in the evening", as well as "drop-in advice sessions, children's activities, community meetings and a local history archive." It was both critiqued and defended, along with other legal social centres, by articles in radical direct action journal Do or Die. A critical article called it "a posh looking bar", noting that "If meetings do take place in The Cowley Club, for example, and run into bar time, those attending the meeting must sign in to the club". The anonymous author maintained there was a danger in enterprises such as the Club "springing up on the back of the direct action movement, they will divert activist time and energy into an essentially non-radical and liberal project". It was defended in a second article as providing a stable base under collective control for a range of activities, a base which squatting is currently unable to provide on a long-term basis.

== Principles ==
The principles of the Cowley Club are summed up as being, "For a social system based on mutual aid and voluntary co-operation; against all forms of oppression. To establish a share in the general prosperity for all – the breaking down of racial, religious, national and sex barriers – and to fight for the life of one earth."

== Harry Cowley ==
Our aim is to provide a community resource space, inspired by Harry's approach to DIY social welfare. He had a self-help attitude towards the things he did, rather than relying on the state. The Cowley Club is being financed by volunteers, with no public funding.

— Cowley Club Spokesperson, as quoted in The Argus.

The club is named after Brightonian Harry Cowley, a chimney sweep who was involved in grass-roots social activism from the 1920s until his death in the 1970s.

== See also ==
- 1 in 12 Club
- Autonomous Centre of Edinburgh
- London Action Resource Centre
- Sumac Centre
- Warzone Collective
