= Edinburgh Unemployed Workers Centre =

Edinburgh Unemployed Workers Centre, also called Broughton Unemployed Workers Centre or simply "The Centre", was an organisation set up by the local Labour Party in Edinburgh, Scotland, as a means of aiding the local unemployed find work in 1981.

However, it soon became independent from the Labour Party and individuals involved became prominent in various social movements of the period, including resistance to the poll tax. The Labour Party objected and the council inspected the building and it was shut down. Activists resisted its eviction by occupying the premises until 1 December 1994. The Centre was frequently in the pages of the local paper, the Broughton Spurtle. The Centre was home to Edinburgh claimants during this period. The collective associated with the Centre was the precursor to what was to become the Autonomous Centre of Edinburgh.

The Edinburgh poet Paul Reekie wrote a poem, "Kiss ma hole", dedicated to the Centre and the Glaswegian writer James Kelman gave a speech at its opening.

== See also ==
- Edinburgh Coalition Against Poverty
