= 121 Centre =

Evicted social centre in London

Coordinates: 51.4577°N 0.1076°W

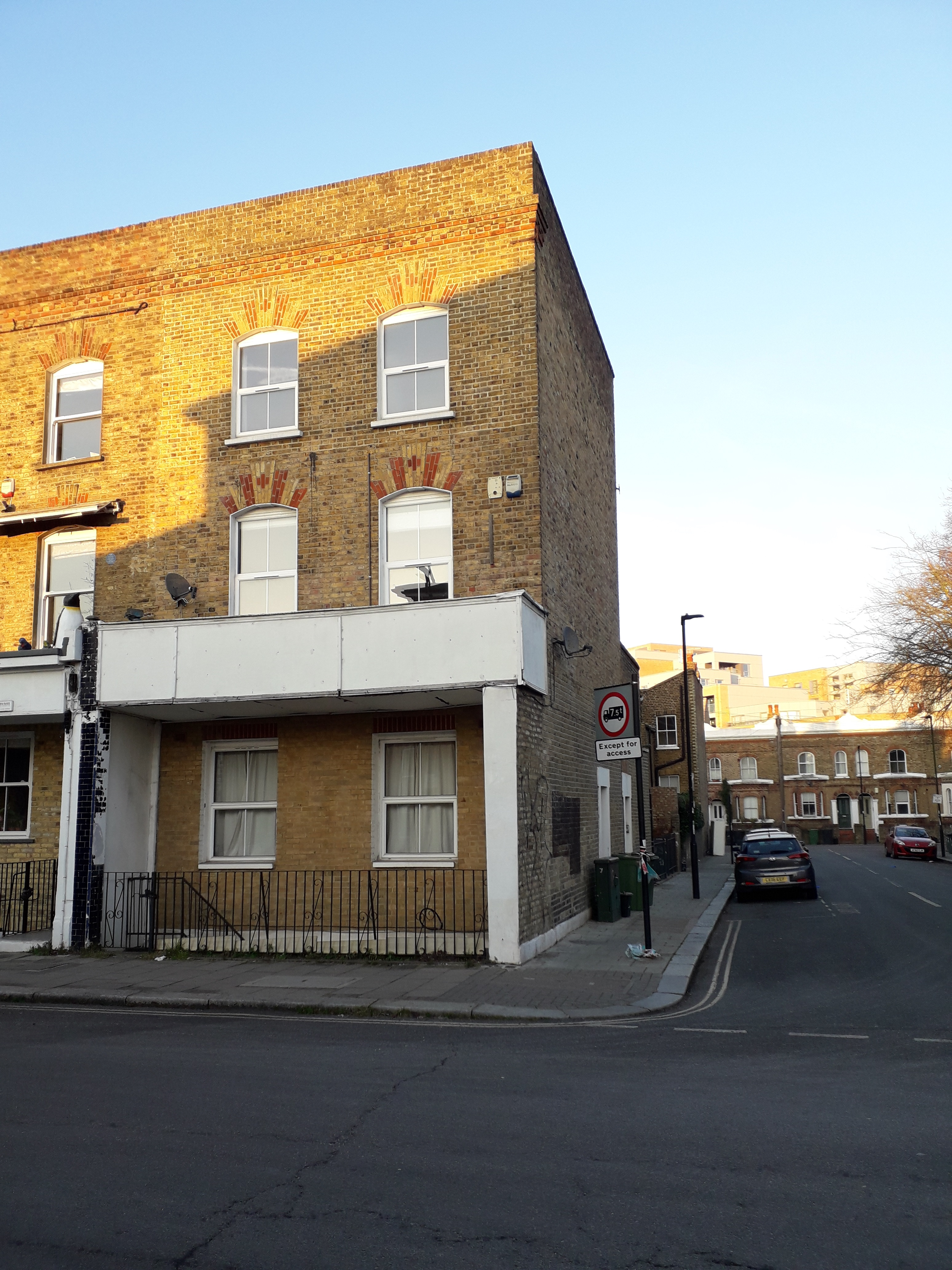
- 121 in 2023
- Interactive map of 121 Centre
- Address: 121 Railton Road; London; England
- Type: Squatted autonomous social centre

Construction
- Opened: 1981
- Closed: 1999

121 Centre was a squatted self-managed social centre on Railton Road in Brixton, south London from 1981 until 1999. As an anarchist social centre, the venue hosted a bookshop, cafe, infoshop, library, meeting space, office space, printing facility, and rehearsal space. Organisations using the space included Food Not Bombs, Anarchist Black Cross prisoner aid chapters, an anarcho-feminist magazine, a squatters aid organisation, and an anarchist queer group. Regular events at 121 Centre included punk concerts, a women's cafe night, and a monthly queer night. The centre kept a low profile and was one of the longest-lasting squats in London.

== Original occupation ==
121 Railton Road was first squatted by Olive Morris in 1973. Sabaar Books was established there before moving elsewhere. The centre then became an anarchist social centre.

== Activities ==
During the 1981 Brixton riots, the centre was left untouched. In 1983, the centre hosted people coming to London for the Stop the City demonstration. The Kate Sharpley Library (KSL) was founded at the 121 in 1979 by, among others, Albert Meltzer. From 1993 onwards, the venue hosted industrial, speedcore, and gabber electronic music events, such as the Sate industrial nights. The social centre was a networking centre for these experimental subgenres. The Dead by Dawn club hosted London's hardest and fastest music between 1994 and 1996. Attendees shared aesthetic interests, including zines, lectures by Sadie Plant, and intellectual literature by the Situationists, Deleuze and Guattari, and William Burroughs. Unlike other club or party series, Dead by Dawn was conceived to be unique in its combination of discussions, videos, films, exhibitions, Internet access, and stalls. The first Queeruption festival was held at 121 in 1998.

The centre was set on fire during a rise in right-wing violence in 1993.

== Eviction ==
The Lambeth London Borough Council obtained a court order to repossess the building in early 1999. The squatters responded with multiple actions to rally opposition: modifying billboards, wheatpasting protest fliers, publishing the South London Stress, and occupying Lambeth Town Hall with a "drink-in" protest of a new law against drinking in public. The Evening Standard reported their campaign as "highly efficient". As the eviction date approached, the squatters barricaded themselves inside and held an all-day street party in April. An armed police force later removed the remaining occupants. Rising property values were a core impetus for the building's repossession.

== Legacy ==
The Kate Sharpley Library collection is now held in California.

== See also ==
- Railton Road
- 56a Infoshop
- 491 Gallery
- Centro Iberico
- Spike Surplus Scheme
- St Agnes Place
- Wapping Autonomy Centre
