= St Agnes Place =

Demolished street in Kennington, south London

Coordinates: 51.4818°N 0.1078°W

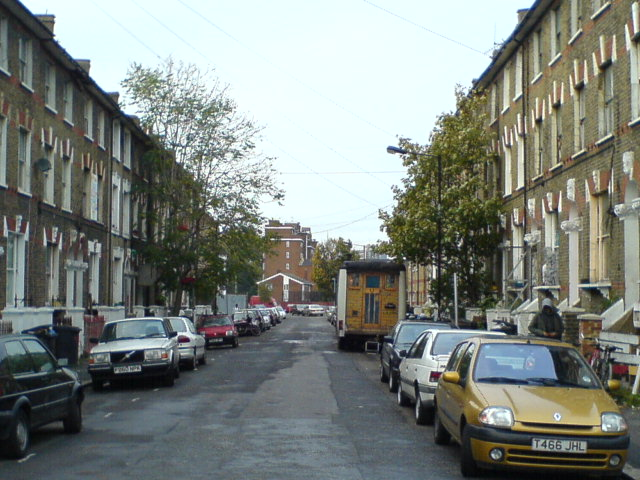
St Agnes Place in 2005, prior to its demolition

St Agnes Place was a squatted street in Kennington, south London, which resisted eviction orders for more than 30 years. When a number of derelict houses were scheduled for demolition to extend Kennington Park in 1969, squatters occupied the properties and a High Court injunction prevented the demolition. The street was run by a housing cooperative until 2005, when Lambeth London Borough Council obtained an eviction order. Demolition was completed in 2007.

== History ==
On 1 June 1969, house number 54 was the first to be squatted. The council had acquired the unit and planned to demolish it for the extension to Kennington Park. The derelict buildings were completely rebuilt by the squatters. An attempt to evict it in 1977 was successfully resisted. An emergency High Court injunction, obtained by solicitors in Lambeth Law Centre, ordered the demolition to stop. The resulting furore and publicity on a national scale prevented further demolition and led to the Conservative leader of the council stepping down.

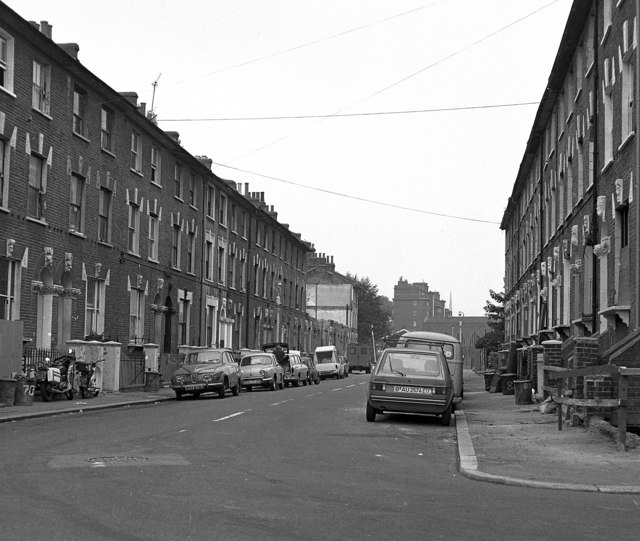
St Agnes Place in 1978

A block of buildings were demolished either side of the road, and some were badly damaged and scaffolded. But a large central block on both sides of the road were completely untouched, and were in occupation on the day of the attempted demolition, and thereafter. Some damaged ones were renovated again by the residents, and made habitable i.e. one was re-roofed, and several were re-wired and had basic services restored.

The residents of St Agnes paid utility bills and for several years were run by a housing cooperative with diverse occupancy. In November 2005, Lambeth London Borough Council finally obtained a High Court of Justice order to evict the residents of 21 properties. This mass eviction was completed on 30 November 2005.

== Community ==
According to a resident in 2005: "It's evolved into a unique community in London. You can walk in and out of people's houses here. It's a safe street. There's no mugging here. I think there is a lot of things society as a whole could learn from the way we live here."

There were several community projects at St Agnes Place:

- Housing the homeless
- A social centre at number 60
- Free parties
- Studios for musicians and artists
- Radio: The street hosted Wireless FM, and a pirate radio station Rasta FM which was raided by Ofcom in October 2005.
- Rastafari community (at least a third of the residents were Rastafari). Bob Marley stayed at the street on several occasions in the 1970s.
- Rastafari Temple (also known as Negusa Negast)
- Ethiopian World Federation London headquarters

== Eviction ==
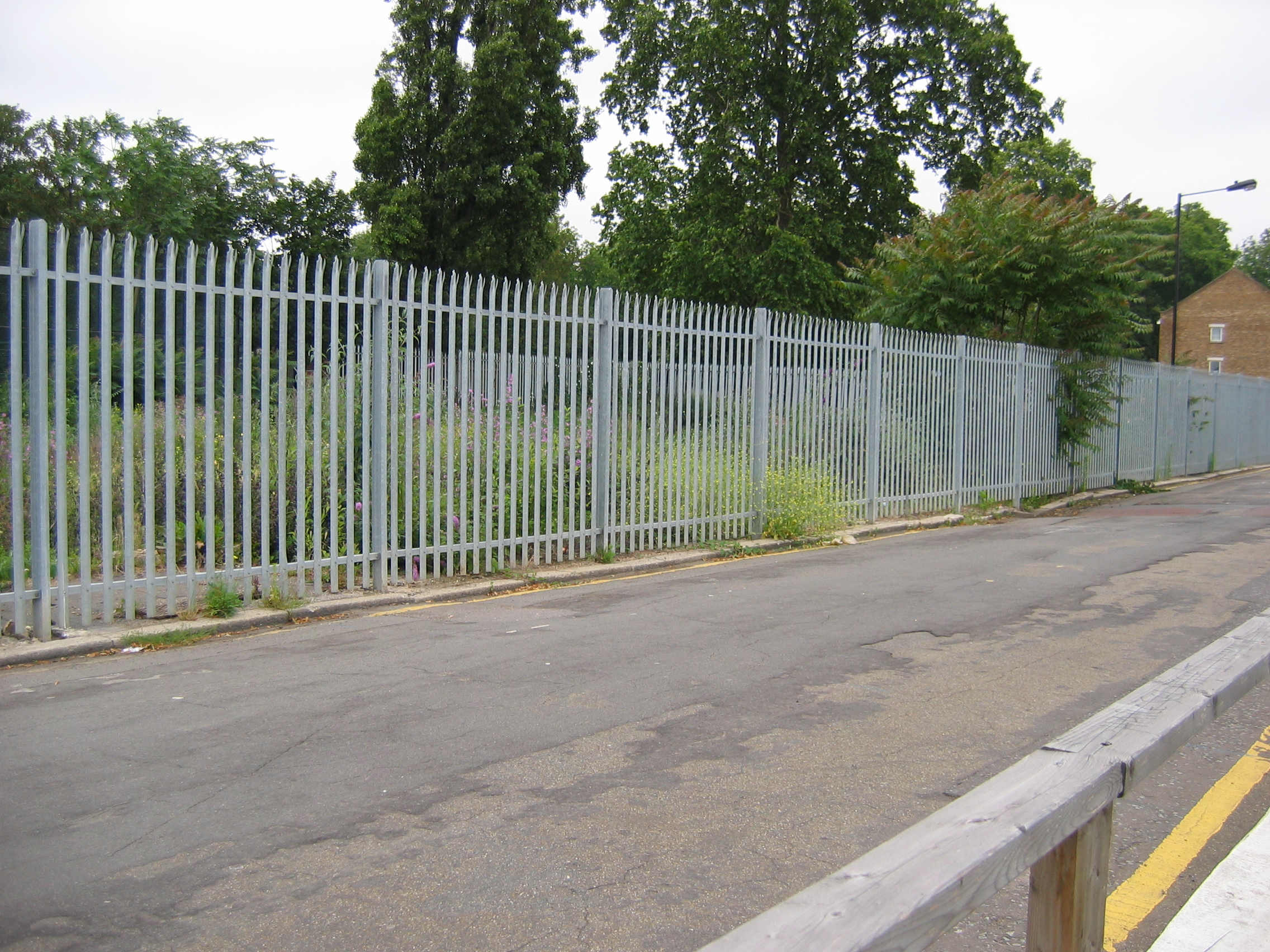
The street in 2007, after its demolition

Lambeth Council obtained a possession order in 2003 and the squatters failed in their attempt to gain adverse possession. Some squatters were threatened with 30 years of Council Tax, with the Council claiming it had lost over £4million in unpaid rent and taxes.

There were a few dates given to the squatters in the summer of 2003 for them to leave when bailiffs would be arriving. Many of the residents moved out and a number of protesters associated with anti-capitalist, environmentalist and travellers movements moved in. Barricades were built and the bailiffs came and left making no attempt to evict anyone.

Nothing more happened regarding the eviction until Autumn 2005 when firstly, the council obtained a demolition order for the street. Secondly, a new court order was issued by the council: The possession orders obtained in 2003 were still valid but the warrants to execute the court order had expired. This new court case was to firstly issue fresh warrants and secondly to have the execution of these warrants handled by the High Court rather than the County Court. This meant that they could use riot police instead of a handful of bailiffs.

A massive eviction happened on Tuesday 29 November 2005 by two hundred bailiffs and police wearing riot gear. There was not much resistance and most people just wanted to avoid any confrontation but wanted to be thrown out rather than leave as a matter of principle. The street was swept and tidied by residents prior to the arrival of the police and banners put up criticising the council, particularly Liberal Democrat councillor Keith Fitchett who described the residents as "parasites".

== Temple ==
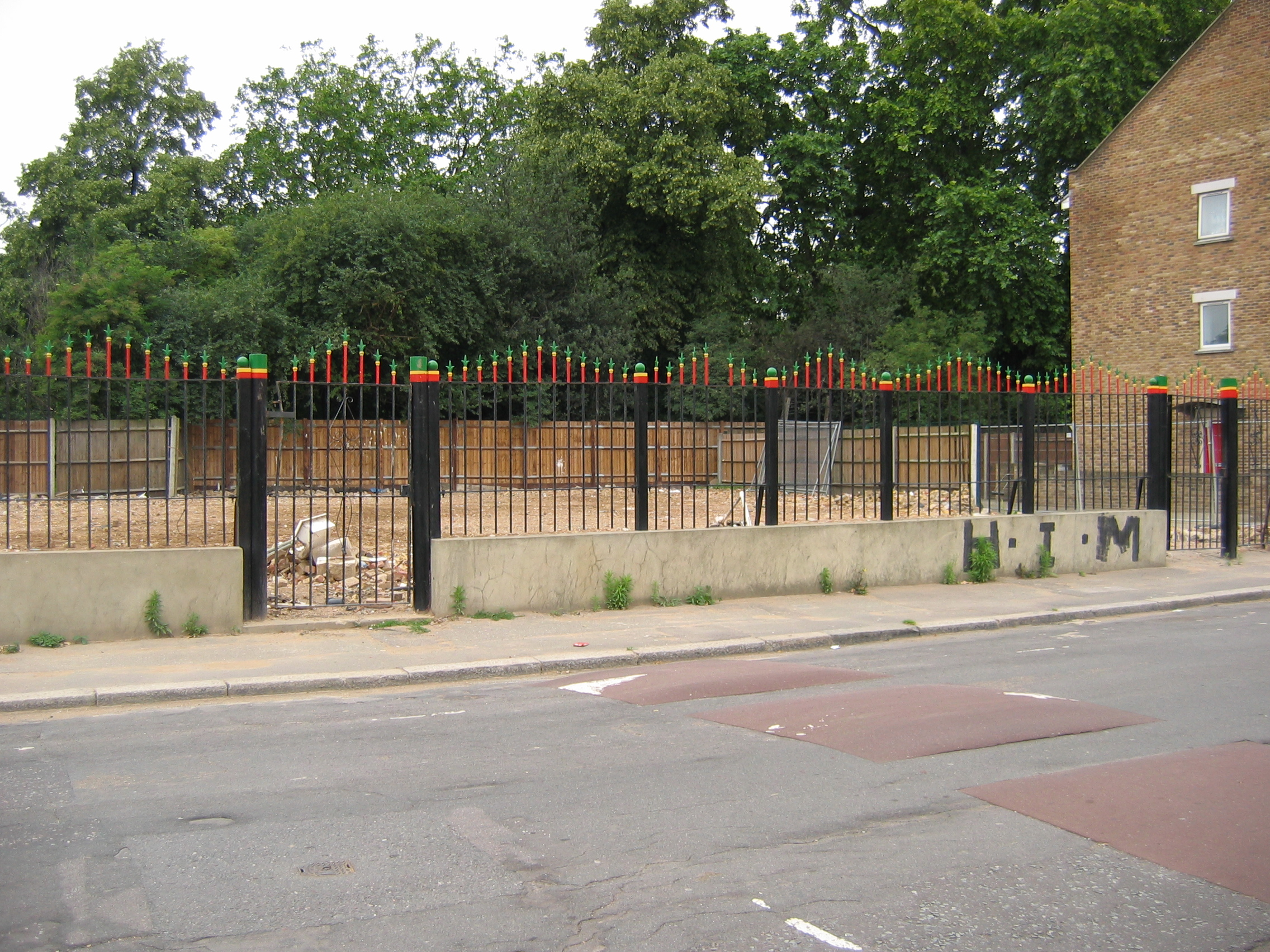
The site of the Rastafarian Temple in July 2007, now marked with green, yellow and red coloured railings

The Rastafari temple, one of the squats on the far end of the street, was first squatted in 1972. It was made up of a number of dwellings and at one point was the London headquarters of the Ethiopian World Federation.

It outlived the 2005 eviction and stayed for another year and a half. It was separated by a large gap from the other houses in the street. The council expressed the intention of coming to some sort of agreement with the occupiers. On 12 April 2007 police raided the temple because it was allegedly being used to sell cannabis and crack cocaine. The police claimed the managers had told them about the drug dealing and gangsters because the temple had been overrun. After the raid, three people were charged with possession with the intent to supply a Class C drug. Nobody was charged with possession of crack cocaine, and cannabis has religious significance for Rastafari. Lambeth Council stated their intention of helping the temple elders find new premises to rent.

By July 2007 the site was demolished. On 5 April 2008, the trial collapsed and all defendants were found not guilty.

== Future development ==
Work on demolishing the houses in the street began immediately after the eviction – 10-foot-high (3.0 m) fencing and 24-hour security made sure the houses were not re-squatted before they got the chance to demolish. Demolition was completed in 2007.

In 2010 Lambeth Council and two housing associations, London and Quadrant and Family Mosaic, put forward planning proposals for the land to be used for housing, 50% of which would be social/affordable housing, together with a re-sited adventure playground and One O'Clock Club.

== Legacy ==
In 2024 an exhibition Echoes Within These Walls was held at Brixton House celebrating the temple and it's memory, including oral histories from former residents. In 2026, photographer Janine Wiedel's images of St Agnes Place were published in a book documenting the squats 2003-2007.

== See also ==
- Self-managed social centres in the United Kingdom
- 121 Centre
- Centro Iberico
- Spike Surplus Scheme
