= Harry Cowley =

Brighton-based working class activist

- Born: 1890; Brighton, England, United Kingdom of Great Britain and Ireland
- Died: 1971 (aged 80–81); United Kingdom
- Resting place: Woodvale Cemetery
- Occupation: Chimney sweep
- Movement: Anti-fascism
- Spouse: Harriet
- Children: 3

Harry Cowley (1890–1971) was a working class organizer, social activist and anti-fascist in Brighton, England.

== Biography ==
Born in 1890 in Brighton, and working as a chimney sweep, he became involved in grass-roots social activism from the 1920s until his death in the 1970s.

Cowley was a key figure in confronting fascism in 1930s Brighton. He was put in hospital for eight months when he was alone and ran into a group of fascists on Middle Street, who broke his leg. He took his revenge by organising an attack on a meeting of the Fascist League on The Level, a park in Brighton.

Cowley became leader of the 'Barrow Boys' in the 1920s. They sold cheap fruit and vegetables out of wheelbarrows on Oxford Street. When the Council attempted to clear the barrows in response to the complaints of local shops, Cowley made a fiery speech to a crowd and when the police attempted to clear it, the protest became known as 'The Battle of Oxford Street.' The barrow boys were subsequently allowed to sell fruit and vegetables on The Level and then, in 1926, the Open Market was built.

In July 1945, Time magazine credited a "bowler-hatted chimney sweep, Harry Cowley, "with blowing "the lid off Britain's housing problem". In Brighton, at the head of 400 self-styled Vigilantes he had moved families of servicemen into three empty houses. As military camps were decommissioned, the example was followed by families across the country in a broad protest against the post-war, post-Blitz, housing shortage.

== Legacy ==
Queenspark Books published a biography of Harry Cowley "Who Was Harry Cowley?" in 1984.

The Cowley Club in Brighton was named after him as a sign of its aim of furthering this tradition of grass-roots organising and class solidarity. Bus operator Brighton & Hove has named a bus after Cowley.
