= London Action Resource Centre =

Self-managed social centre in london

Coordinates: 51.5170°N 0.0640°W

The London Action Resource Centre (LARC) is an anarchist infoshop and self-managed social centre situated in Whitechapel, in the East End of London. Previously a school and a synagogue, it was purchased in 1999. It hosts meetings and events from various groups and is part of the UK Social Centre Network.

== History ==
The building was constructed 1866–7 as a mission house and infants’ school, keeping this usage until around 1918. It then housed the Louise Michel International Modern School, organised by Jewish anarchists. It also hosted the New Worker's Friend (Arbeter Fraynd) Club and the East London Anarchist Group. It was then converted into a synagogue in 1925. After World War II, the building was used in the rag trade before falling into dereliction.

LARC was purchased in the autumn of 1999 by people active in Reclaim the Streets, just after the Carnival against Capitalism which occurred on 18 June 1999. It was rebuilt over three years. The Guardian described it in 2005 as "a hub of the new anarchist movement."

It has been used for events and as a meeting place by various groups, including the Radical Librarians Collective, Queeruption and Indymedia in London. It was originally known as the Fieldgate Action Resource Centre. LARC is part of the UK Social Centre Network, alongside other projects which were set up around the same time, like the Cowley Club in Brighton and the Sumac Centre in Nottingham, and also the 1 in 12 Club in Bradford. On its own website, the project states it is "a cooperatively owned and run building dedicated to the furthering of social justice and environmental issues, locally, nationally and globally. We believe this is done through direct action, refusing to be a spectator or waiting for someone else to do it for us. It is about taking back power and realising our potential to bring about change. This is an anti-capitalist, non-hierarchical space."

In April 2022, the LARC was raided by the Metropolitan Police during protests by Just Stop Oil.

== See also ==
- Freedom Press
- rampART
