= The 1 in 12 Club =

Anarchist social centre in Bradford, England

Coordinates: 53.79452°N 1.75815°W

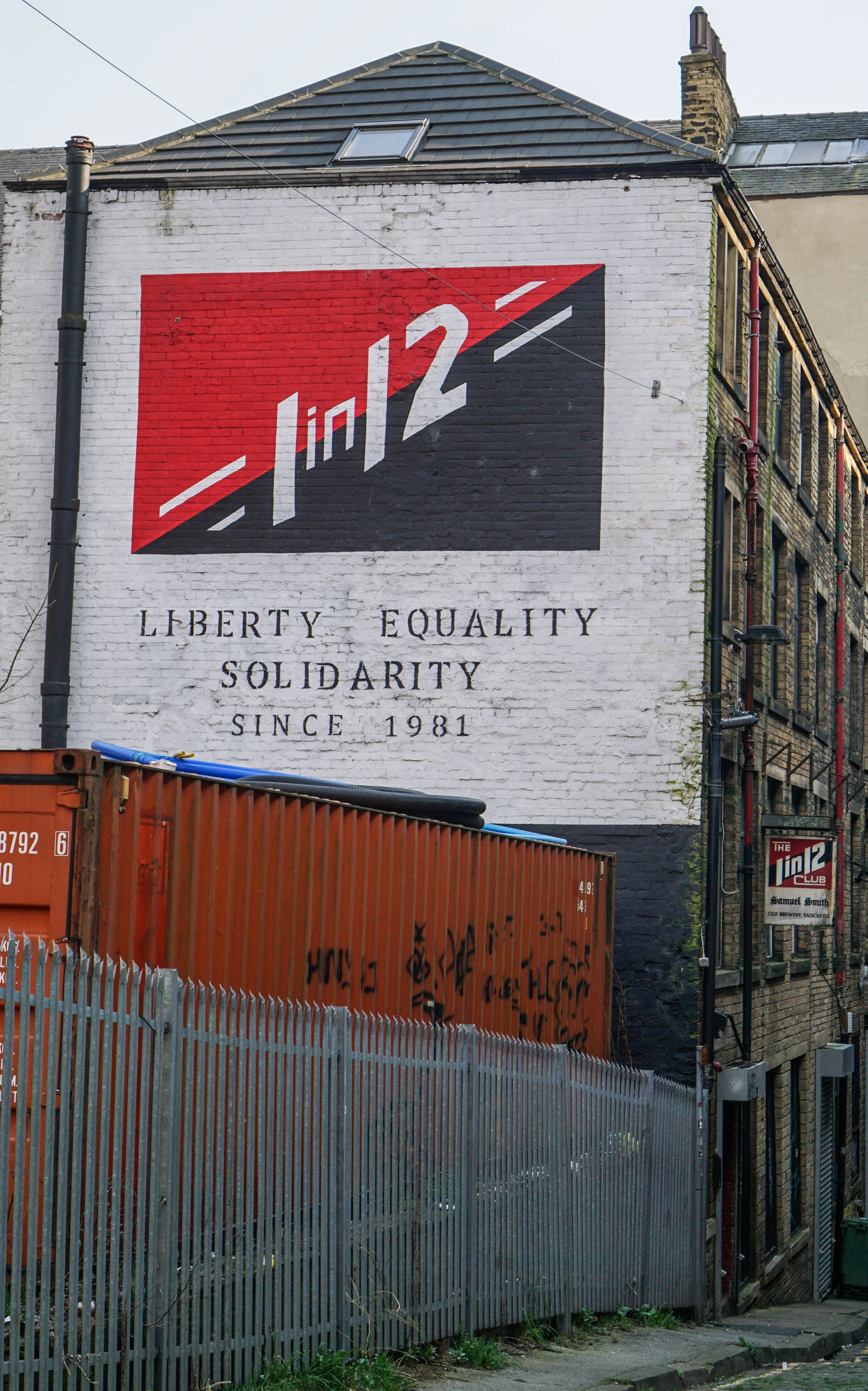
- The 1 in 12 Club as seen from the top of Albion Street
- Formation: 1981; 45 years ago
- Founded at: Bradford
- Headquarters: Goitside, Bradford, West Yorkshire, England
- Website: https://1in12club.co.uk/

The 1 in 12 Club is a self-managed social centre in Bradford, West Yorkshire, England. Owned and run by its membership as a collective based upon anarchist principles, its activities include social and political campaigning—most visibly as a hub for the city's May Day activities—and use of the building as a self-managed social centre and host for performing arts. In the 1980s it was one of the main locations for the UK crust and anarcho-punk scene, and in the 1990s played host to much of the country's straight edge metalcore scene.

== Background ==
The club was formed by members of Bradford's anarchist orientated Claimants Union in 1981. The immediate objectives of the club were to generate and sustain a social scene, accessible and affordable to both the low waged and unemployed. The expectation and hope was that this would in turn encourage the anarchist values of self-management, co-operation and mutual aid. The late 1970s and early 1980s saw massive job losses across Britain and Bradford was no exception with GEC and International Harvester shutting plants in the City. Against this backdrop a particularly strong and active Claimants Union emerged which campaigned vigorously to improve the situation for unemployed and low waged people in Bradford. In 1981, a government investigation into benefit fraud found that '1 in 12' claimants was actively "defrauding the state", and the union adopted this statistic as its name.

From the outset the 1 in 12 Club has identified itself with the anarchist principles of self-management, mutual aid and co-operation. As such the 1 in 12 logo has always been placed upon a red and black flag, the historic colours of the international anarchist movement.

One member commented in 2003: "The club is about having a social space that's accessible to working class people. We also want a space, a journalistic space if you like, where we can state our ideas. I think it's about reclaiming what's ours to reclaim. We don't have the right to reclaim the Philippines, we do have the right to reclaim Bradford because it's ours. That's always been a really strong thing, that Bradford is ours – it's no more complicated than that really. From that, everything else flows – everything the club's done."

== Functions ==
The 1 in 12 Club is two separate things: firstly it is a group of people who work together to promote certain political ideals and social change; secondly it is a building housing a self-managed social centre. The group formed in 1981 and the present building was found in 1988.

The sovereign decision making body of the 1 in 12 Club is the bi-monthly Sunday Meeting which is open to all members. All other committees and collectives within the Club are answerable to it. However this created an apparent conflict of responsibilities with the General Committee required by law. This has been avoided by the elected officers of the General Committee meeting on a Sunday with the legally established proviso that all Club members can attend and contribute fully to any decisions made. In this way the Sunday Meeting effectively functions as the General Committee of the Club.

Each October the 1 in 12 Club holds its Annual General Meeting at which the membership must elect officers to the various posts in the Club. The AGM is also an important opportunity for the membership to review the financial and general progress of the Club and the various collectives active within it. In addition an Extraordinary General Meeting which has the same powers as an AGM can be called by any ten members at any time during the year.

== Objectives ==
The original objectives of the 1 in 12 Club were to develop and spread the anarchist values of self-management, co-operation and mutual aid. Through gigs, books, records and direct action, the Club has sought to extend the influence of these ideas throughout Bradford and beyond.

== Activities ==
In 2005, the centre was recorded as having an infoshop, a café, a children's play area, a bar, large meeting areas and performance spaces.

Alongside other groups like Bristol's Easton Cowboys, the 1 in 12 has an anti-capitalist football club and cricket club. The club has a library formally opened in 1996 by the anarchist Albert Meltzer. The bar funds the rest of the social centre's activities.

The club is a participant in the UK Social Centre Network and hosts the annual Means to an End punk/hardcore festival.

The actor Sean Pertwee recently stated in an interview that he had enjoyed a visit to the club in the late 80's when he was in Bradford researching a part for a film about people who had abandoned modern clothes. He stated 'it was an unusual little place that had a slightly damp feel and an odour of cat urine, however, I grew to love it and all the strange little people who went there, apart from the band Doom who were actually quite rude and a bit weird'

== See also ==
- 121 Centre
- 924 Gilman Street
- Autonomous Centre of Edinburgh
- Cowley Club
- London Action Resource Centre
- Sumac Centre
- Trumbullplex
- Warzone Collective
