= Forest Fields =

Area of Nottingham, England

Coordinates: 52.969°N 1.163°W

- Suburb
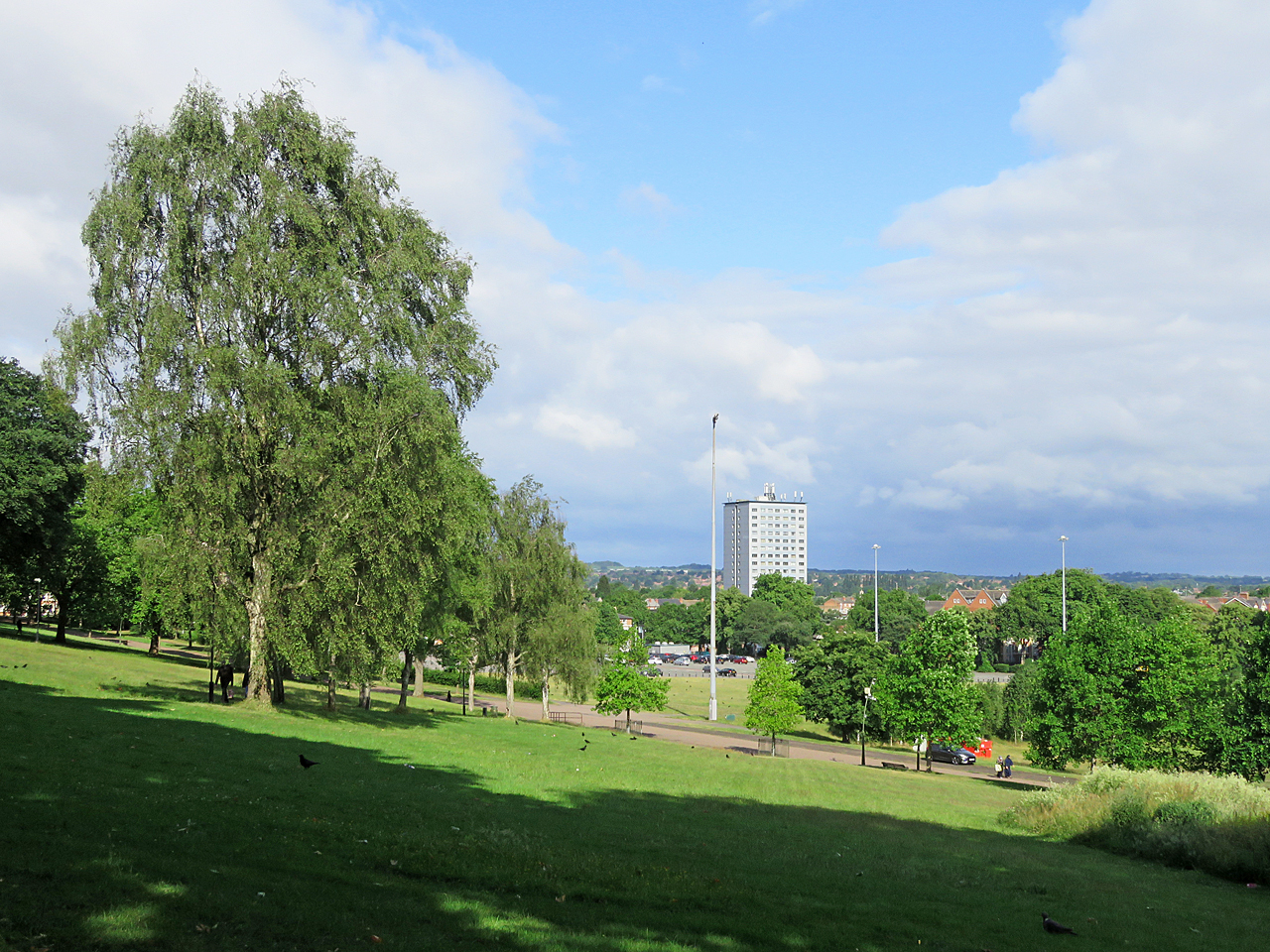
- Forest Recreation Ground

- Location within Nottinghamshire
- Population: 6,577
- OS grid reference: SK5620541655
- Unitary authority: Nottingham
- Ceremonial county: Nottinghamshire
- Region: East Midlands
- Country: England
- Sovereign state: United Kingdom
- Post town: NOTTINGHAM
- Postcode district: NG7
- Dialling code: 0115
- Police: Nottinghamshire
- Fire: Nottinghamshire
- Ambulance: East Midlands
- UK Parliament: Nottingham East

Forest Fields is an inner-city area and suburb of the City of Nottingham, in the county of Nottinghamshire, England.

== Geography ==
Forest Fields is slightly north of the city centre, just past the Forest Recreation Ground. The area includes 31 streets from Noel Street (Asda) to Nottingham Road (NCN Claredon, Sherwood Rise practitioners, Djanogly Sixth Form) and from Gregory Boulevard to Gladstone Street (Basford factories). The areas that surround Forest Fields are New Basford, Sherwood Rise, Hyson Green, and Radford.

== Local attractions ==
Berridge Road in Forest Fields is one of the main streets in Nottinghamshire for Asian shopping. The main shops on Berridge Road include the Seehra Saree Centre, Eastern Fashions, Adnans Sweet Centre, a grocery store, and the vegan/vegetarian bakery the Screaming Carrot. Previous well-known shops included Kashif Videos, the Gift Shop, Georges Fish bar, and Mizan Bookstore

The area is also home to the Djanogly City Academy, on the site of the former Forest Comprehensive School. Nearby is NCN Clarendon, run by New College Nottingham. There are also several primary schools, including Scotholme Primary and Forest Fields Primary School. It used to be Forest Fields Grammar School, and before 1954 it was High Pavement Grammar School.

Along Noel Street is a charitable organisation called Asian Women's Project. On Gladstone Street is the Sumac Centre, a co-operatively owned, non-hierarchical social centre.

== Community groups ==
There are a number of community groups in Forest Fields, including a residents' group, Forest Fields Improvement Association, NG7 Food bank, and, since 2012, the Nottingham Solidarity Network. Past groups include a transition initiative called Transition Forest Fields.

The Sumac Centre is home to a number of groups, including the Forest Fields Social Club and Veggies Catering Campaign. The centre also has a weekly people's kitchen, a bike repair shop, a free shop, a library, and a book shop, as well as being the base for the Sumac Youth Club, a group formed by the Robin Hood Solidarity Group to work with 7- to 15-year-olds in the local area.

== Demographics ==
Forest Fields is an ethnically diverse community, with significant black and South Asian communities.

== History ==
Nearby churches include St Stephen With St Paul's Church.

== Popular culture ==
A number of early releases by Tindersticks were recorded in Forest Fields.

Although mainly set in the Radford part of the city, many of Alan Sillitoe's books mention streets in Forest Fields.
