= Centro Iberico =

Former self-managed social centre in London

Coordinates: 51.5259°N 0.2051°W

Centro Iberico, London, in the early 1970s was an international anarchist support centre founded and presided over by Spanish Civil War veteran Miguel Garcia. After leaving Chalk Farm in 1976, and moving into a squatted school building in Notting Hill, London, it became a self-managed social centre, venue and studio for the Anarcho-punk scene, surviving into the early 1980s.

== Origins ==
Centro Iberico was established in central London in 1970 by Miguel García García, a veteran of the Spanish Civil War, who was imprisoned under Franco's regime for twenty years. While in Madrid’s Carabanchel Prison, Garcia met Stuart Christie, a Scottish anarchist serving time for his part in a plot to assassinate Franco. Pardoned in 1967, Christie returned to London where, when he won his own release in 1969, Garcia joined him in the work of the Anarchist Black Cross, an anarchist prisoners’ aid organisation. Garcia first created the Centro Iberico as a meeting space for Black Cross and other anarchist activists, in the parish hall of Holy Trinity, Kingsway, central London.

== Anarchist centre in Chalk Farm ==
In June 1973, the Centro Ibérico moved to a large basement, at 83a Haverstock Hill, near Chalk Farm, Camden. This also accommodated the printing press on which the Black Flag newsletter and other anarchist material was produced, overseen by Garcia who had been a typesetter at age 13.

In 1974, meeting in the Centro, the Black Flag Group consisted, in addition to Stuart and Garcia, of Albert Metzler, Ted Kavanagh, Lynn Hudelist, Iris Mills, Graham Rua, Philip Ruff and John Olday (an anarchist artist and performer who led regular cabaret nights). According to Ruff, Special Branch "bitterly resented" the failure to convict Stuart Christie in the “Angry Brigade” trial in December 1972. That, combined with a "failed attempt" by Spanish and French police to implicate Stuart Christie in a plot by Spanish militants to abduct a Spanish banker in Paris, "meant that a lot of police attention, as well as interest from several European security agencies, was focused on what went on in the Centro".

One of the prisoners for which Garcia, the Black Cross and Black Flag campaigned for through the Centro was Salvador Puig Antich, a Catalan anarcho-syndicalist. Puig Antich, who used call in with Garcia at the Centro in its "early days", had returned to Spain in September 1973. There, after a series of robberies to fund the Iberian Liberation Movement (Movimiento Ibérico de Liberación, or MIL), he was arrested for the death of a policeman in a shootout. Despite the international outcry, Puig Antich was executed in March 1974.

== Anarcho-Punk venue in Notting Hill ==
The Centro had to leave Haverstock Hill in September 1976. It moved briefly into church hall in North London before finding a home in a squatted former schoolhouse at 421 Harrow Road, Notting Hill. Meanwhile the dictator Francisco Franco had died and Garcia had returned to Spain.

In Notting Hill, where it was also known as the Anarchy or Alternative ‘A’ Centre, in the early 1980s the Centro hosted anarcho-punk gigs by the Mob, Conflict, Poison Girls and the Subhumans. Throbbing Gristle played and recorded at the centre. Future Madonna producer William Orbit began his recording career and Guerilla Records whilst living there.

== See also ==
- Wapping Autonomy Centre
