= 56a Infoshop =

Self-managed social centre in London, England

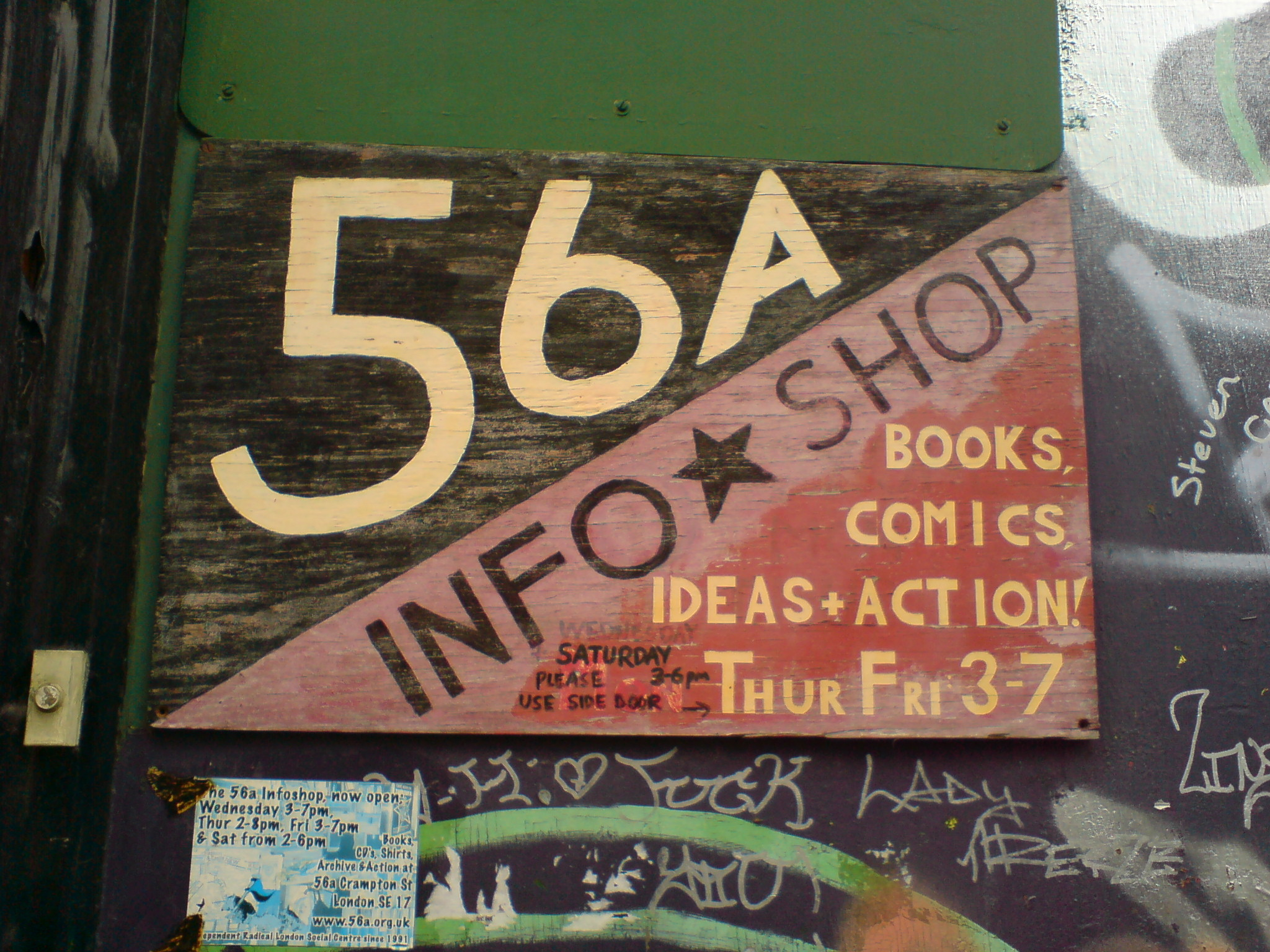
- Infoshop sign
- 51°29′26.5″N 0°06′00.3″W
- Location: Crampton Street; London, SE17, United Kingdom
- Type: Social Centre and Archive
- Established: 1991 (35 years ago)
- Branches: 1

Collection
- Items collected: Books, newspapers, magazines, pamphlets, and zines
- Size: 50,000+ items (2021)
- Legal deposit: No

Access and use
- Access requirements: Open to anyone with a need to use the collections and services

Other information
- Website: 56a

56a Infoshop is a self-managed social centre, archive, and shop based in Elephant and Castle, Southwark, London. Its collection centres around left and far-left materials including information on anarchism, anti-gentrification, to squatting.

== History ==
56a Infoshop was founded in 1991 initially as a squat and a self-managed social centre. From here, it eventually had to accept an agreement in 2003 to pay a "peppercorn" rent by Southwark Council to remain functional within the area.

== Services ==
The infoshop offers mixed, volunteered services from selling books, book exchanges, free bike workshops, squatter workshops, free meeting spaces, and an open-access archival collection.

== Collection ==
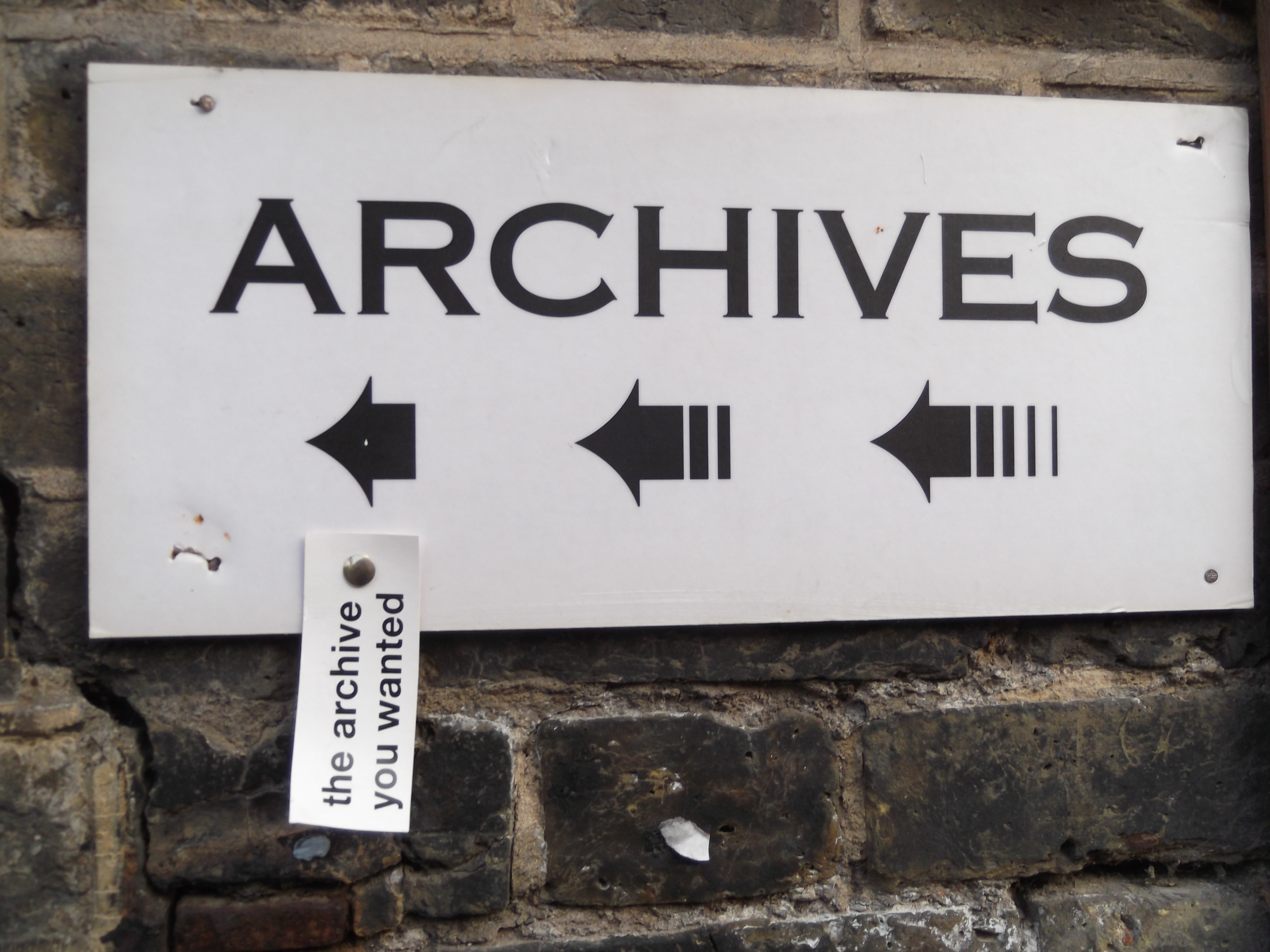
56a Infoshop archive sign.

56a Infoshop's collection of over 50,000 items (2021) focuses on collecting left and far-left radicial and anarchical materials ranging from books, leaflets, magazines, maps, pamphlets posters, zines, and other print material. The collection mainly spans items from the 1980s up to the present day.

They have an ongoing digitisation effort through their online catalogue and take on scan-a-thons to preserve collection material. External partners including other archival spaces like MayDay rooms. 56a Infoshop also operates the online resources Southwark Notes that "is a campaigning group and research project concerned with the impact of the regeneration and gentrification of Southwark".

== Governance ==
The infoshop is run by volunteers, largely unfunded, and presents an informal, DIY archival and resource space.
