= 491 Gallery =

Former gallery and social centre in London, England

Coordinates: 51.5670°N 0.0063°E

Frontage of the 491 Gallery.

The 491 Gallery was a squatted self-managed social centre and multi-disciplinary gallery in Leytonstone, London, England, that operated from 2001 to 2013. Taking its name from its street number, 491 Grove Green Road, the former factory was home to a community-led art organisation and served as an exhibition space for a diverse range of artists of different origins working in varied media. It contained a range of art and music studios, which were used to host workshops, classes and musical rehearsals. The building was subsequently demolished in 2016.

== Origin ==
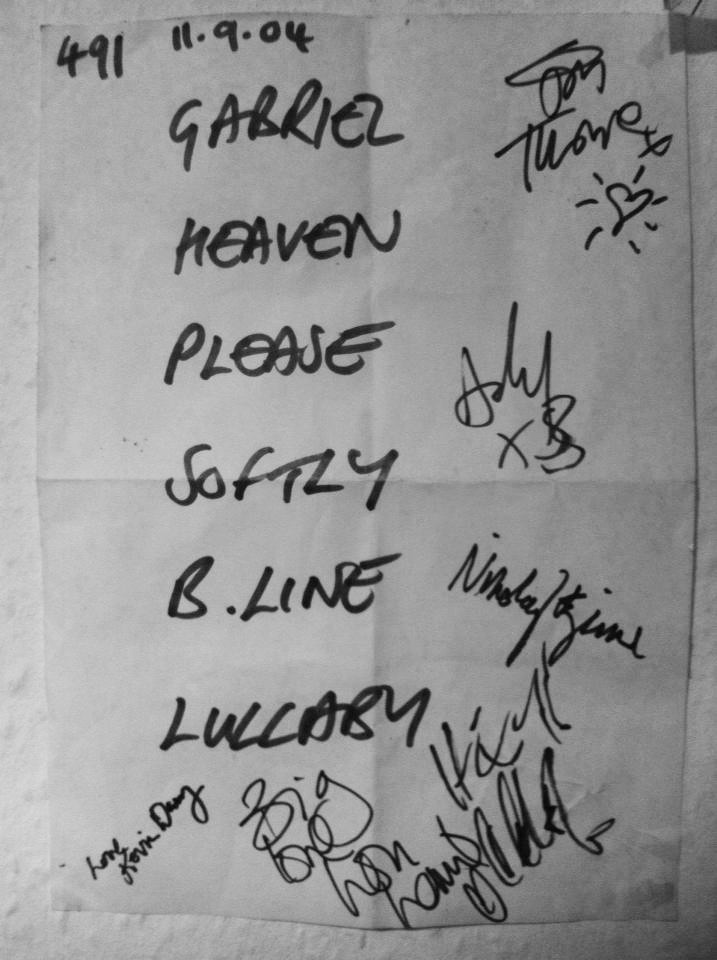
Musicians that performed at the 491 Gallery included Lamb, who played a secret show on their final live tour in 2004.

The building, originally a factory, was later used as a storage space and warehouse for materials being used to construct the A12 that cuts through Leytonstone and the surrounding areas. Unlike the rest of the surrounding buildings, it and the few neighbouring houses were not subject to compulsory purchase orders and demolition for the A12 site. When in late 2000 the building was abandoned, it became occupied by a group of homeless drug users, who remained in it for some six months. Within a month of their vacating the premises, the building was reoccupied by a group of artists, who spent the next several years turning it into a community space. The neighbouring building, formerly houses, was also occupied, and named Vertigo, after the film by Alfred Hitchcock, a famous resident of Leytonstone.

== Activities ==
The 491 Gallery and Vertigo collectively collaborated on hosting regular exhibitions and offered studio space for musicians to use. They were maintained largely through small donations made by the public. Transport for London, the 491 building's legal owner at the time, agreed to allow the continued use of the building, although no formal arrangement was made with the occupants. The owner of the Vertigo building allowed its use for an annual peppercorn rent of £1. The Gallery regularly hosted art exhibitions, themed events and film screenings, such as a Transition Towns screening of The Power of Community: How Cuba Survived Peak Oil.

Following a fire in 2008, the Vertigo building was rebuilt throughout by its residents, and in 2009 was decorated with an exterior mural of Hitchcock to add to the artistic tributes in the local area, such as the mosaics in the neighbouring Leytonstone Underground station.

== Closure ==
In June 2012, Transport for London sold the building to property developers seeking to demolish the building and build a block of flats.

On 14 January 2013, the 491 Gallery closed and was given to the new owners. The Vertigo building was not subject to sale. In the spring of 2016 the former gallery building and its community garden were demolished. The Vertigo building was also sold, and eventually demolished in 2019.

== See also ==
- The M11 link road protest which accompanied the construction of the neighbouring dual carriageway.
