= Bank of Ideas =

Former self-managed social centre in London

Coordinates: 51.520213°N 0.084382°W

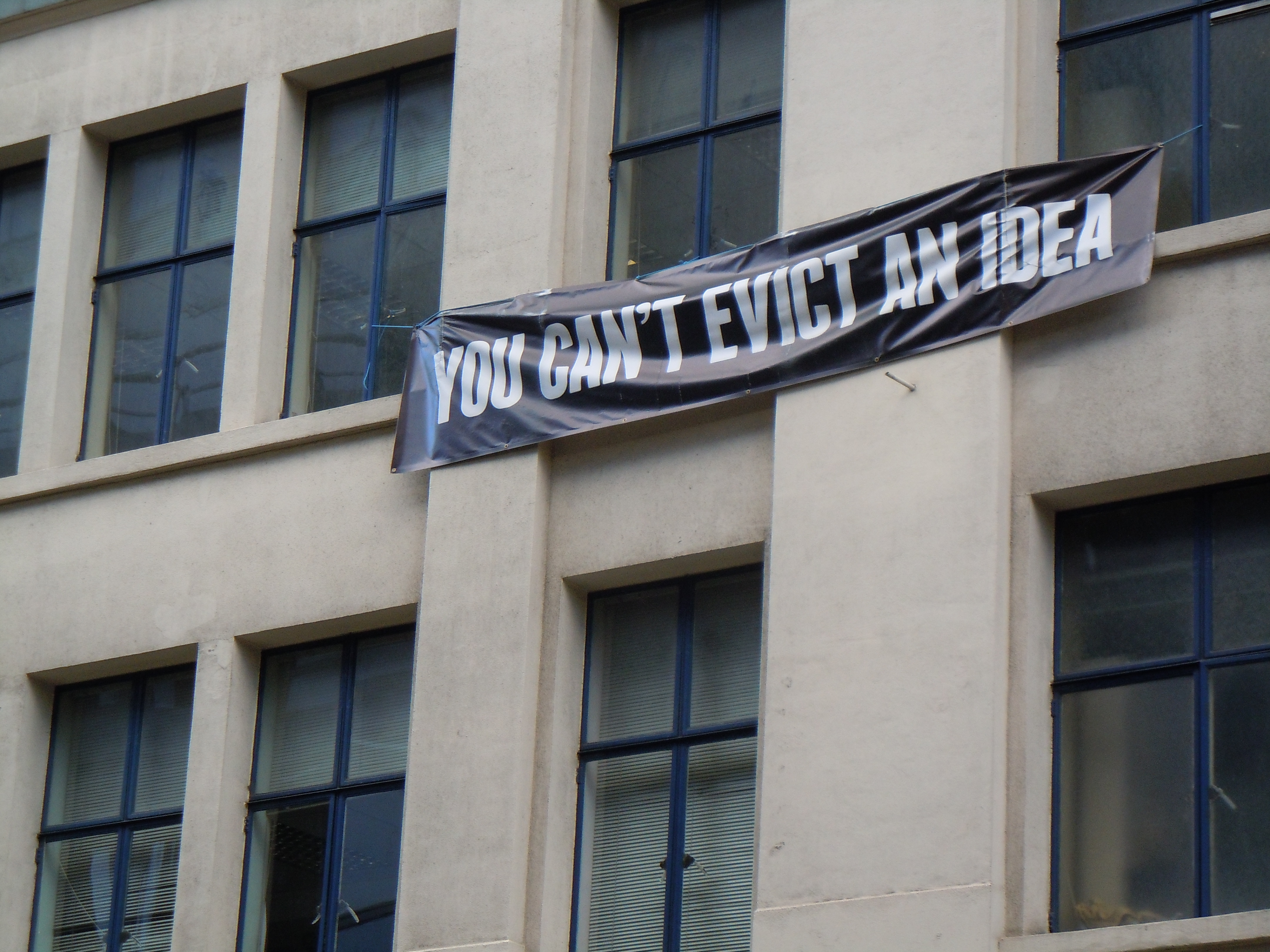
A banner on the building in January 2012

The Bank of Ideas was a squatted, self-managed social centre in a disused UBS office complex on Sun Street in the City of London, England. It remained in the building from November 2011 until January 2012. The building was owned by UBS, and the squatters were members of the Occupy London protest movement. The building was described by an Occupy London spokesman as "a space for political discussion".

== Aims ==
The Bank of Ideas' website stated that its purpose was to host "the non-monetary trade of ideas to help solve the pressing economic, social and environmental problems of our time" and referred to itself as a "public repossession". The idea of "repossessing" bank property, according to one member of the movement, was in response to bank takeovers of households behind on their mortgage payments. Drugs and alcohol were forbidden at the Bank of Ideas, as was all commercial activity. The centre continued to engage in organized meetings, events, and actions until about March 2012.

== History ==
The building on Sun Street was occupied by protesters from November 2011. It hosted teach-ins and seminars on various social, economic and political issues. Other events included a mock trial of the United Kingdom government for alleged war crimes conducted during the War in Afghanistan, a screening of the BAFTA-winning film How to Start a Revolution and a free performance by the bands Radiohead and Massive Attack.

== Eviction ==
All seminars and events at the Bank of Ideas were suspended indefinitely after a court approved UBS's request for the organization's eviction on 26 January 2012. The centre was evicted from the site on 30 January 2012. While most people left peacefully, clashes between law enforcement and remaining squatters led to the arrest of one man on suspicion of criminal damage and assault.
