= Warzone Collective =

Northern Irish anarchist punk project

Warzone Collective was formed in Belfast, Northern Ireland, in 1984. It is an anarchopunk group which set up a self-managed social centre called Giro's in 1986. The project moved to a bigger premises in 1991 and became known as the Warzone Centre. The project closed down in 2003 and the collective folded, only to reform in 2009 and open another iteration of the social centre in 2011. This project closed down in 2018 and the collective continues.

== Background ==
1980s Belfast was greatly affected by the Troubles, a sustained military conflict between many different parties. The name Warzone is a reference to this background. Giro's is a reference to the Giro bank transfer by which unemployment benefit was distributed. The punks of Warzone took a stance which was indifferent to religion and anyone was welcome at the social centre, whether they were atheist, Catholic or Protestant.

In the early 1980s, punks would meet at Fountain Street and Cornmarket in Belfast, and at the short-lived Anarchy Centre. They were inspired by bands like Crass and The Undertones. After the Warzone Collective formed in 1984, a social centre with a café, rehearsal space and a screen printing room known as Giro's was set up in 1986. The space was used for meetings by anarchist, animal rights, lesbian and gay groups.

== Warzone Centre ==
In 1991, the social centre moved to a larger place (on Donegal Lane) and became known as the Warzone Centre. The café continued and there was also a DIY, all ages punk venue. It hosted many gigs before closing in 2003. Warzone became a fixture for touring bands, including Bluetip, Godflesh, Hard Skin, Jawbreaker and Los Crudos. Local bands included Stalag 17 and Toxic Waste. Warzone was similar to many other self-managed projects worldwide such as the 1 in 12 Club in Bradford and the 924 Gilman Street in Berkeley. Photographer Ricky Adam published a book called Belfast Punk in 2017 which profiled the punk scene based around Warzone in the 1990s.

The collective reformed in 2009 and opened a new social centre (also called Warzone Centre or just the centre) at a new location on Little Victoria Street in 2011. The centre had a vegan café (still called Giro's) and hosted gigs. It also put on documentary film nights and provided a meeting space for different groups, for example pro-choice and guerilla gardening.

The centre was evicted in 2018 and the building was demolished.
