= RampART =

Social centre in Whitechapel, London

Coordinates: 51.5141°N 0.0611°W

rampART was a squatted social centre in the Whitechapel area of east London. It was established in a derelict building in Rampart Street which was previously used as an Islamic school for girls. The centre operated as a private members club providing a space for a wide range of groups to carry out their activities. It was managed by volunteers without any funding and with a strong emphasis on consensus decision making and DIY culture.

The centre was variously known as rampART Social Centre, rampART creative centre and social space, or more commonly as rampART.

The centre lost a court case brought by the owner and awaited eviction from 3 January 2008. It was finally evicted on 15 October 2009.

== Developments at rampART ==
At the 2009 G-20 London summit protests police raided squats occupied by protesters including the one on Rampart Street where the police believed people involved in violent disorder were staying. There was around 20 people in it. Four from Rampart were arrested on 2 April 2009.

On 15 October 2009 rampART was evicted. Rampart reported on its own Wordpress social media blog page that 45 police officers, several bailiffs and a priest were present, and a chainsaw was used to enter the building and climbers also used the roof as a means of access.

== Background ==
rampART was opened in 2004. and was located at 15 to 17 Rampart Street, London E1 2LA. The project was initiated by a mixture of artists, community groups and political activists. Within the first year, the building had hosted over 100 cultural and political events.

The centre was run by an open collective as an autonomous space. It was open to all on the basis of equality for all. Projects were run on an entirely voluntary basis by the people involved. The projects were run in the spirit of co-operation, solidarity and mutual aid. It was not a commercial enterprise run for profit - instead it was funded day-to-day by donations given by users, or by raising funds through benefit events such as gigs, cafés or film nights.

=== Gatherings ===
- During the Hugo Chávez referendum there was a week-long 'Venezuela Solidarity' event.
- During the European Social Forum rampART accommodated over 50 European visitors as well as laying on free food and a range of entertainment.
- No Border network presented an exhibition in 2009 by French photographer Julie Rebouillat about migrants sleeping rough in Calais.
- WANC (Women's Anarchic Nuisance Café) took place on a monthly basis.
- A talk by indigenous Mexican activists on behalf of peasant farmers.

== See also ==
- Self-managed social centres in the United Kingdom

== Sources ==
- "ESF radio from rampart" written 14 October 2004, retrieved 7 June 2006.
