= Matthew Sparke =

Geographer and scholar of globalization

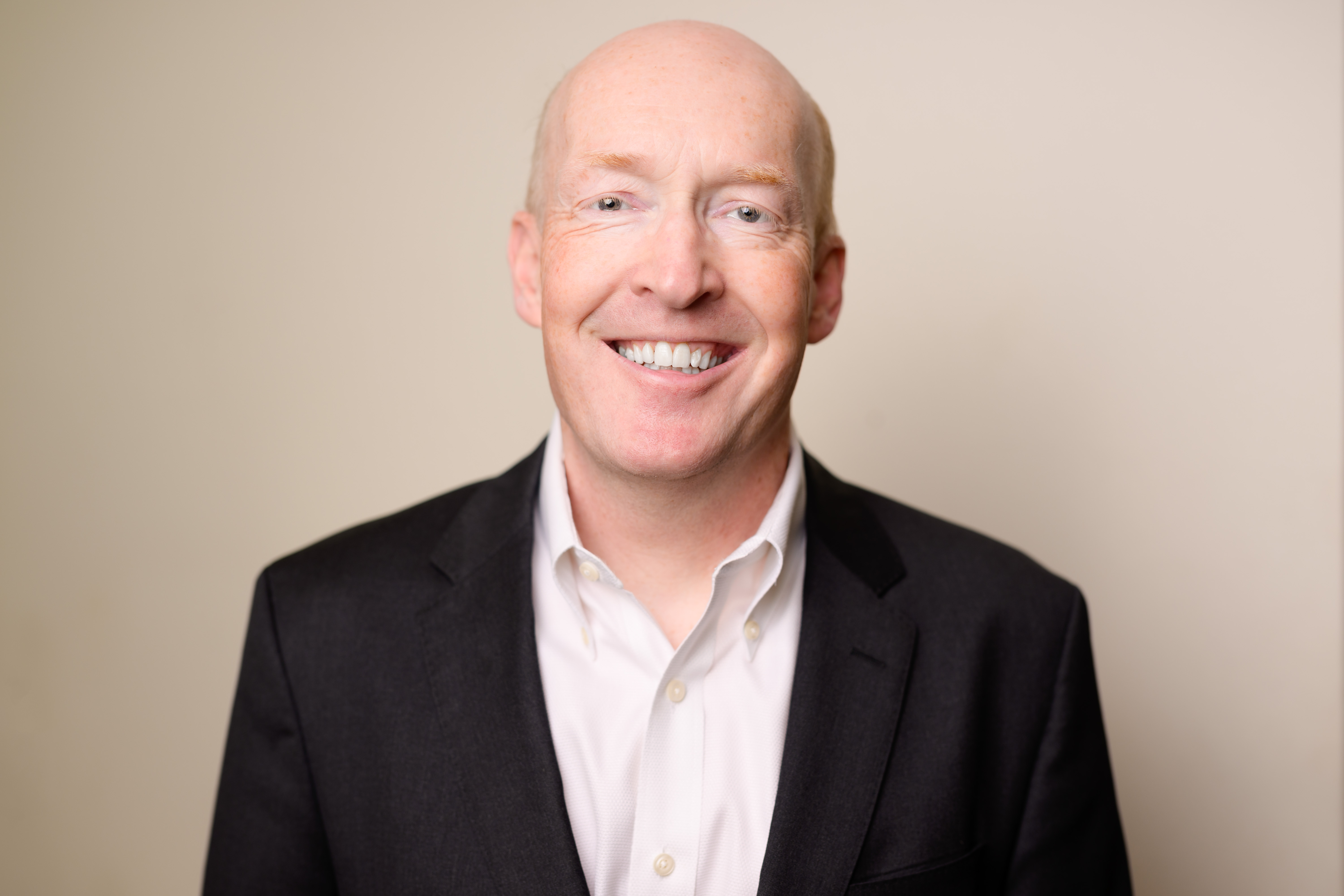
Sparke in 2022

Matthew Sparke (born in 1967) is a geographer and scholar of globalization whose work addresses global health, citizenship, neoliberalism, geopolitics, and border studies. He is a Professor of Politics at the University of California Santa Cruz, where he co-directs an interdisciplinary program in Global and Community Health.

== Early life and education ==
Sparke was born in the UK in 1967 and grew up in Tonbridge, Kent. He attended St Gregory's, a state comprehensive school in Tunbridge Wells. He attended the University of Oxford in 1986 to study Geography at Hertford College and served as sacristan at Pusey House. He graduated from Oxford with a Congratulatory First in Geography, having benefited from the inspirational teaching of David Harvey. He obtained a master's degree in 1991 and his Ph.D. in 1996 at the University of British Columbia, Canada, where Derek Gregory was his doctoral advisor.

== Career ==
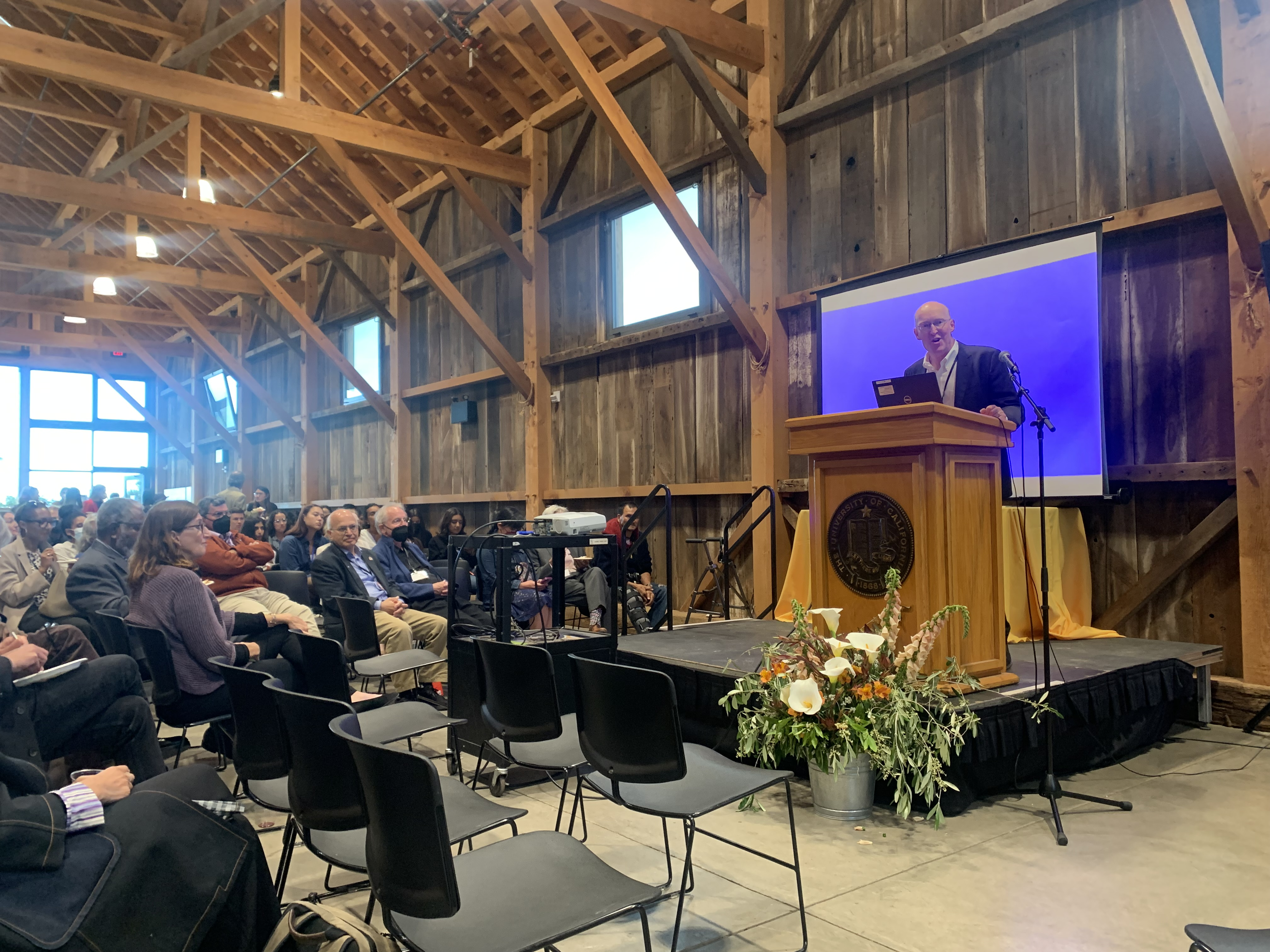
Sparke speaking at UCGHI's Global Health Day at UCSC in 2022.

In 1995 Sparke began teaching at the University of Washington, where he held joint appointments in the Jackson School of International Studies and the Department of Geography. At UW, he helped create the degree in Integrated Social Sciences as well as a new undergraduate program in Global Health in collaboration with the Department of Global Health, researchers from the Institute of Health Metrics and Evaluation, and leaders from the non-profit organization Health Alliance International. Sparke's research in Seattle focused on the impact of globalization on global health, citizenship, governance, borders, geopolitics and geoeconomics. In 2017 he moved to take up his current position at UCSC, where he has worked with colleagues from all five university divisions to create two new degrees – a BA and BS – in global and community health. He also serves as an editor for the academic journals: Transactions of the Institute of British Geographers and Globalization and Health. In May 2022, Sparke delivered Hong Kong University's Common Core Distinguished Lecture.

== Research ==
Sparke's work on globalization took off in 1999 after the anti-WTO protests in Seattle. His work is funded by the National Science Foundation Faculty Early Career Development award and support from other foundations. His critiques of flat-world and smooth-world depictions of globalization and empire, combined with the inspiration of Paul Farmer and a Mountains Beyond Mountains approach to global health, have led Sparke into research on the inequalities and politics of global health.

== Selected works ==
- Introducing Globalization: Ties, Tensions and Uneven Integration (New York: Wiley-Blackwell, 2013)
- In the Space of Theory: Post-foundational Geographies of the Nation-State (Minneapolis: University of Minnesota Press)
