= Anti-globalization movement =

Worldwide political movement against multinational corporations

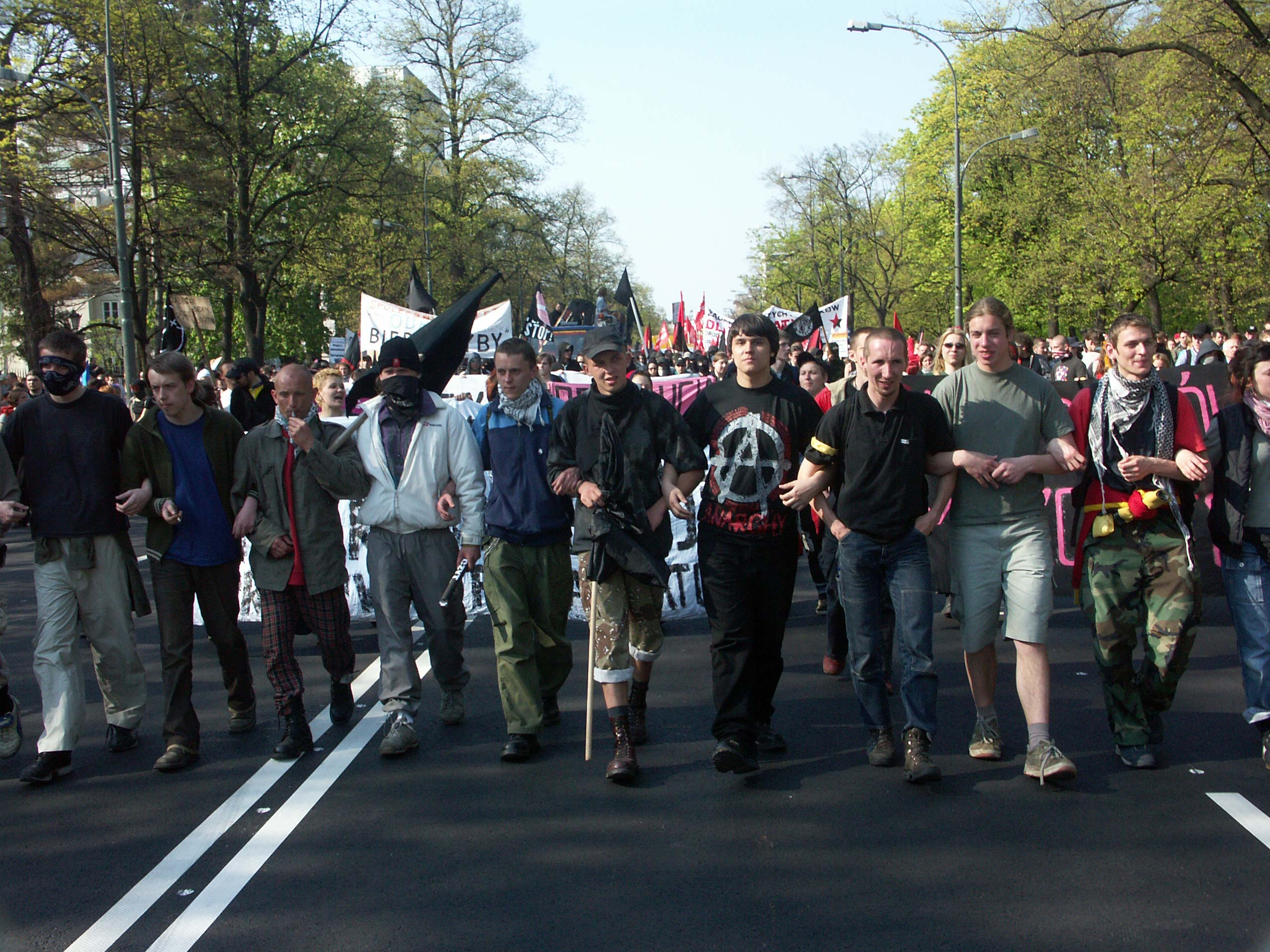
Thousands of people gathered for a demonstration in Warsaw, Poland, as the country prepared to enter the European Union in 2004.

The anti-globalization movement, or counter-globalization movement, is a social movement critical of economic globalization. The movement is also commonly referred to as the global justice movement, alter-globalization movement, anti-globalist movement, anti-corporate globalization movement, or movement against neoliberal globalization. There are many definitions of anti-globalization.

Participants base their criticisms on a number of related ideas. What is shared is that participants oppose large, multinational corporations having unregulated political power, exercised through trade agreements and deregulated financial markets. Specifically, corporations are accused of seeking to maximize profit at the expense of work safety conditions and standards, labour hiring and compensation standards, environmental conservation principles, and the integrity of national legislative authority, independence, and sovereignty. Some commentators have variously characterized changes in the global economy as "turbo-capitalism" (Edward Luttwak), "market fundamentalism" (George Soros), "casino capitalism" (Susan Strange), and as "McWorld" (Benjamin Barber).

== Ideology and causes ==
Supporters believe that by the late 20th century, those they characterized as "ruling elites" sought to harness the expansion of world markets for their own interests. This combination of the Bretton Woods institutions, states, and multinational corporations has been called "globalization" or "globalization from above." In reaction, various social movements emerged to challenge their influence; these movements have been called "anti-globalization," "alter-globalization" or "globalization from below."

=== Opposition to international financial institutions and transnational corporations ===
People opposing globalization believe that international agreements and global financial institutions, such as the International Monetary Fund (IMF) and the World Trade Organization, undermine local decision-making. Corporations that use these institutions to support their own corporate and financial interests can exercise privileges that individuals and small businesses cannot, including the ability to:

- Move freely across borders
- Extract desired natural resources
- Use a wide variety of human resources

The movement aims for an end to the legal status of "corporate personhood", the dissolution of free market fundamentalism, and the radical economic privatization measures of the World Bank, the IMF, and the World Trade Organization.

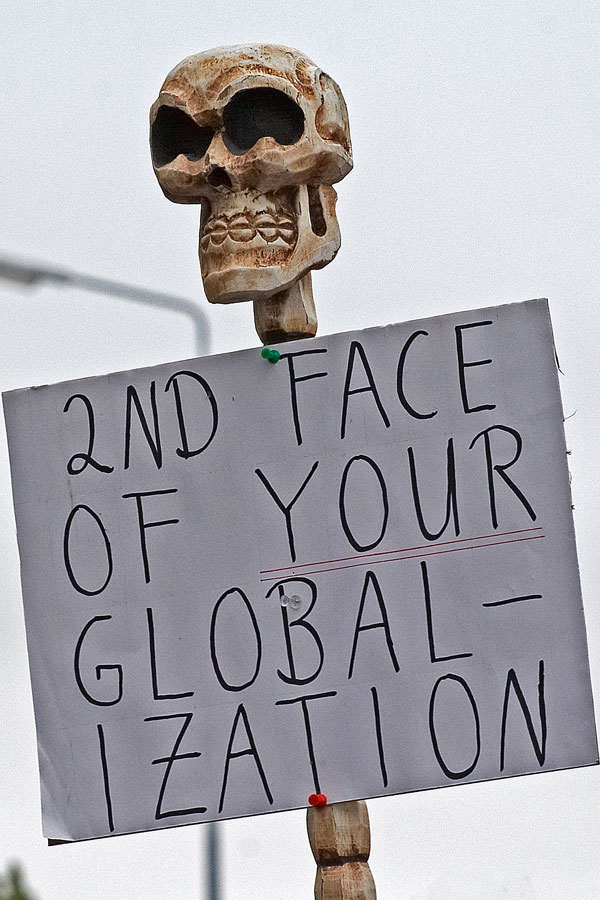
Protest against the G8 meeting in Heiligendamm, 2007

Activists are especially opposed to the various abuses that they think are perpetuated by globalization and the international institutions that, they say, promote neoliberalism without regard to ethical standards or environmental protection. Common targets include the World Bank (WB), International Monetary Fund (IMF), the Organisation for Economic Co-operation and Development (OECD) and the World Trade Organization (WTO) and free trade treaties like the United States–Mexico–Canada Agreement (USMCA), Free Trade Area of the Americas (FTAA), the Trans-Pacific Trade Agreement (TPPA), the Multilateral Agreement on Investment (MAI) and the General Agreement on Trade in Services (GATS) and the World Economic Forum (WEF). In light of the economic gap between rich and poor countries, adherents of the movement claim that free trade without measures to protect the environment and the health and well-being of workers will merely increase the power of industrialized nations (often termed the "Global North" in opposition to the developing world's "Global South"). Proponents of this line of thought refer to the process as polarization and argue that current neo-liberal economic policies have given wealthier states an advantage over developing nations, enabling their exploitation and leading to a widening of the global wealth gap.

A report by Jean Ziegler, UN Special Rapporteur on the right to food, notes that "millions of farmers are losing their livelihoods in the developing countries, but small farmers in the northern countries are also suffering" and concludes that "the current inequities of the global trading system are being perpetuated rather than resolved under the WTO, given the unequal balance of power between member countries." Activists point to the unequal footing and power between developed and developing nations within the WTO. With respect to global trade, in relation to the protectionist policies towards agriculture enacted in many developed countries. These activists also point out that heavy subsidization of developed nations' agriculture and the aggressive use of export subsidies by some developed nations. The export subsidies make agricultural products more attractive on the international market, and this is a major cause of declines in the agricultural sectors of many developing nations.

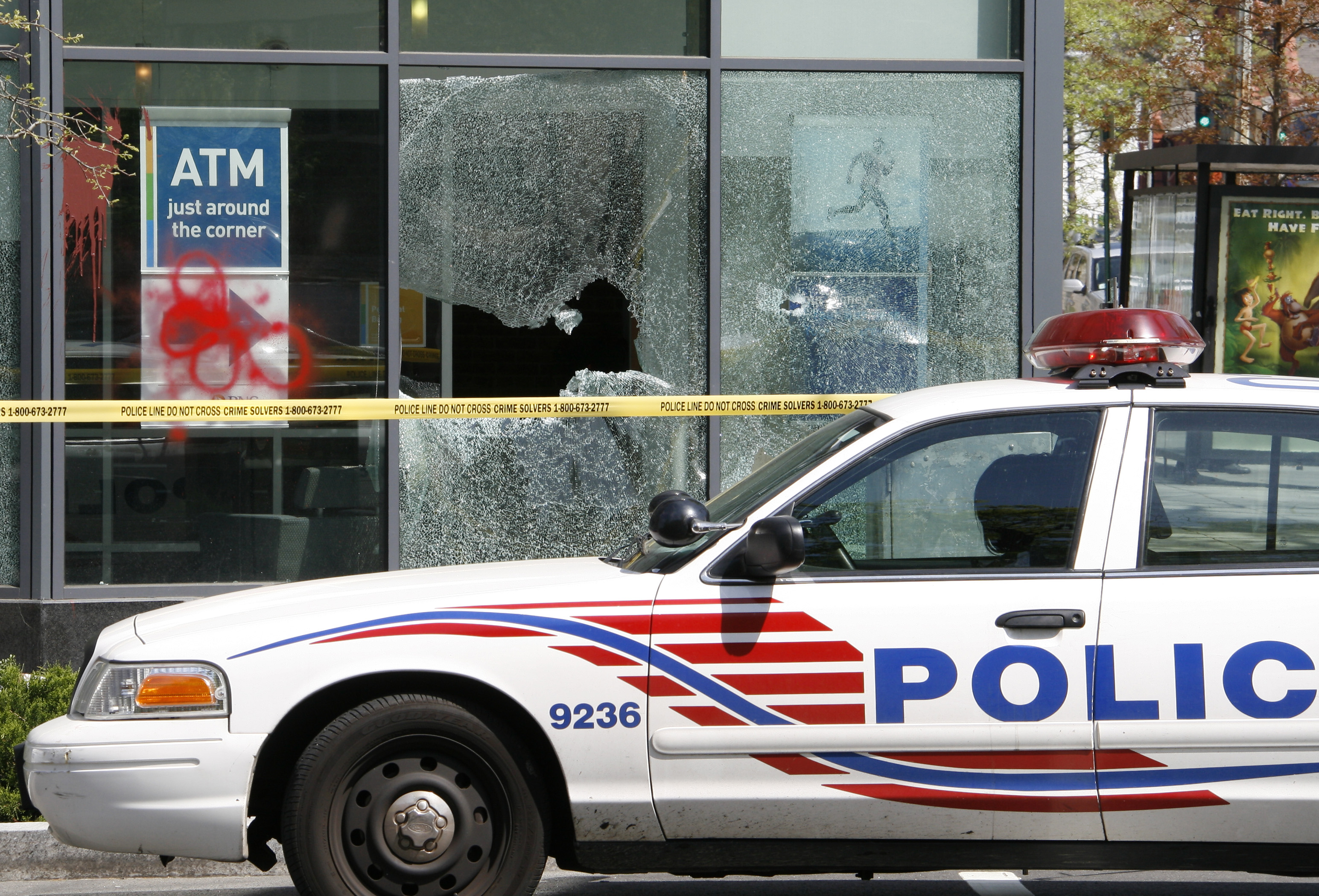
World Bank/IMF protesters smashed the windows of this PNC Bank branch located in the Logan Circle neighborhood of Washington, D.C.

=== Global opposition to neoliberalism ===
Through the Internet, a movement began to develop in opposition to the doctrines of neoliberalism which were widely manifested in the 1990s when the Organisation for Economic Co-operation and Development (OECD) proposed liberalization of cross-border investment and trade restrictions. This was implemented through its Multilateral Agreement on Investment (MAI). This treaty was prematurely exposed to public scrutiny and subsequently abandoned in November 1998 in the face of strenuous protest and criticism by national and international civil society representatives.

The neoliberal position argued that free trade and reduction of public-sector regulation would bring benefits to poor countries and to disadvantaged people in rich countries. Anti-globalization advocates urge the preservation of the natural environment, human rights (especially workplace rights and conditions) and democratic institutions are likely to be placed at undue risk by globalization unless mandatory standards are attached to liberalization. Noam Chomsky stated in 2002 that:

The term "globalization" has been appropriated by the powerful to refer to a specific form of international economic integration, one based on investor rights, with the interests of people incidental. That is why the business press, in its more honest moments, refers to the "free trade agreements" as "free investment agreements" (Wall St. Journal). Accordingly, advocates of other forms of globalization are described as "anti-globalization"; and some, unfortunately, even accept this term, though it is a term of propaganda that should be dismissed with ridicule. No sane person is opposed to globalization, that is, international integration. Surely not the left and the workers movements, which were founded on the principle of international solidarity—that is, globalization in a form that attends to the rights of people, not private power systems.

=== Anti-war movement ===
By 2002, many parts of the movement showed wide opposition to the impending invasion of Iraq. Many participants were among the 11 million or more protesters who on the weekend of February 15, 2003, participated in global protests against the imminent Iraq war. Other anti-war demonstrations were organized by the anti-globalization movement: see for example the large demonstration, organized against the impending war in Iraq, which closed the first European Social Forum in November 2002 in Florence, Italy.

Anti-globalization militants worried about a proper functioning of democratic institutions as the leaders of many democratic countries (Spain, Italy, Poland and the United Kingdom) were acting against the wishes of the majority of their populations in supporting the war. Chomsky asserted that these leaders "showed their contempt for democracy".

The economic and military issues are closely linked in the eyes of many within the movement.

=== Christian right ===
Opposition to globalization has been present among the Christian right. Globalization, among the Christian right, is seen as a way of imposing a centralized standard upon institutions such as the nuclear family and nation, though economic critique has been secondary to the "homogenization of social relations." In their 2003 book Globalizing Family Values: the Christian Right in International Politics, authors Doris Buss and Didi Herman note that while the views of those on the Protestant right have some overlap with anti-globalization on the left, such as concern for effects on developing nations, the underlying issue for the Protestant right is one of "secular values and morality they believe accompany, indeed underpin, economic globalization." The United Nations is seen as one example of a dominating centralized entity whose "economic program is aimed at destroying Christian American sovereignty and compelling the U.S. government to engage in economic relations with anti-Christian regimes".

=== Appropriateness of the term ===
The movement has no singular name, chiefly because it has no singular leader or consensus to give it one. It has been called a variety of names based on its general advocacy for social change, justice, and radical activism, and its general opposition to capitalism, neoliberalism, and corporate globalization. Activists also resisted using a name conferred by corporate media to smear the intention of their protests. Some activists were also not necessarily against globalization.

Many participants (see Noam Chomsky's quotes above) consider the term "anti-globalization" to be a misnomer. The term suggests that its followers support protectionism and/or nationalism, which is not always the case – in fact, some supporters of anti-globalization are strong opponents of both nationalism and protectionism: for example, the No Border network argues for unrestricted migration and the abolition of all national border controls. S. A. Hamed Hosseini (an Australian sociologist and expert in global social movement studies), argues that the term anti-globalization can be ideal-typically used only to refer to only one ideological vision he detects alongside three other visions (the anti-globalist, the alter-globalist and the alter-globalization). He argues that the three latter ideal-typical visions can be categorized under the title of global justice movement. According to him, while the first two visions (alter-globalism and anti-globalism) represent the reconstructed forms of old and new left ideologies, respectively, in the context of current globalization, only the third one has shown the capacity to respond more effectively to the intellectual requirements of today's global complexities. Underlying this vision is a new conception of justice, coined accommodative justice by Hosseini, a new approach towards cosmopolitanism (transversal cosmopolitanism), a new mode of activist knowledge (accommodative consciousness), and a new format of solidarity, interactive solidarity.

Some activists, for instance at the New York City Ya Basta! Collective in 2001, have said that what they are opposed to is "corporate globalization". Scholar David Graeber argued that the term "anti-globalization" was a misnomer, and that radical activists are actually more in favor of globalization, in the sense of "the gradual dismantling of national borders to allow the free movement of people, possessions, and ideas" than are the IMF or WTO. He also notes that activists use the terms "globalization movement" and "anti-globalization movement" interchangeably, indicating the confusion of the terminology. The term "alter-globalization" has been used to make this distinction clear.

While the term "anti-globalization" arose from the movement's opposition to free-trade agreements (which have often been considered part of something called "globalization"), various participants contend they are opposed to only certain aspects of globalization and instead describe themselves, at least in French-speaking organizations, as "anti-capitalist", "anti-plutocracy," or "anti-corporate." Le Monde Diplomatique's editor, Ignacio Ramonet's, expression of "the one-way thought" (pensée unique) became slang against neoliberal policies and the Washington consensus.

=== Nationalist opposition to globalization ===
The term "anti-globalization" does not distinguish the international leftist anti-globalization position from a strictly nationalist anti-globalization position. Many nationalist movements, such as the French National Front, Austrian Freedom Party, the Italian Lega Nord, the Greek Golden Dawn or the National Democratic Party of Germany are opposed to globalization, but argue that the alternative to globalization is the protection of the nation-state. Other groups, influenced by the Third Position, are also classifiable as anti-globalization. However, their overall worldview is rejected by groups such as Peoples Global Action and anti-fascist movements such as Antifa. In response, the nationalist movements against globalization argue that the leftist anti-globalization position is actually support for alter-globalization.

=== Influences ===
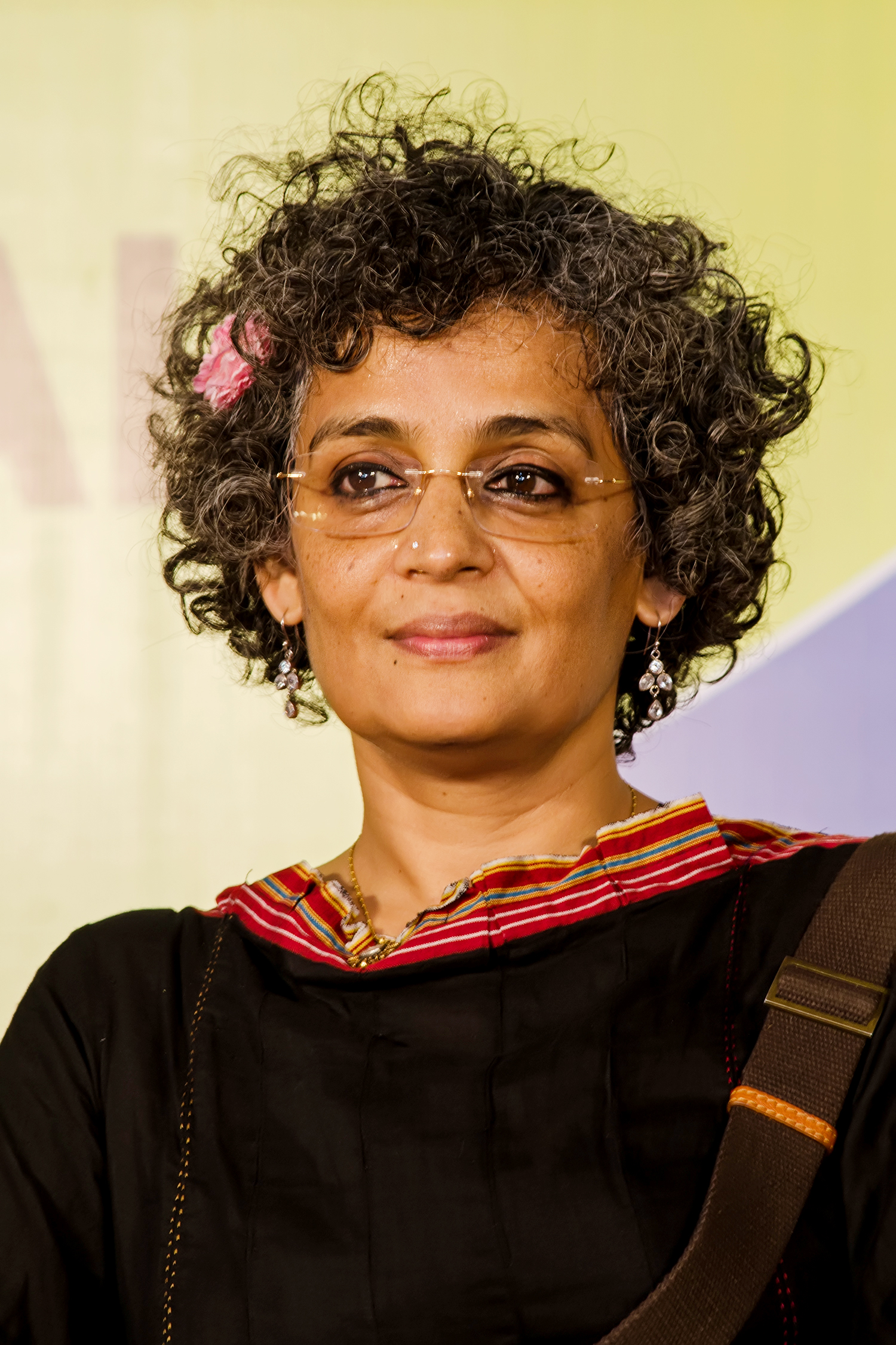
Arundhati Roy

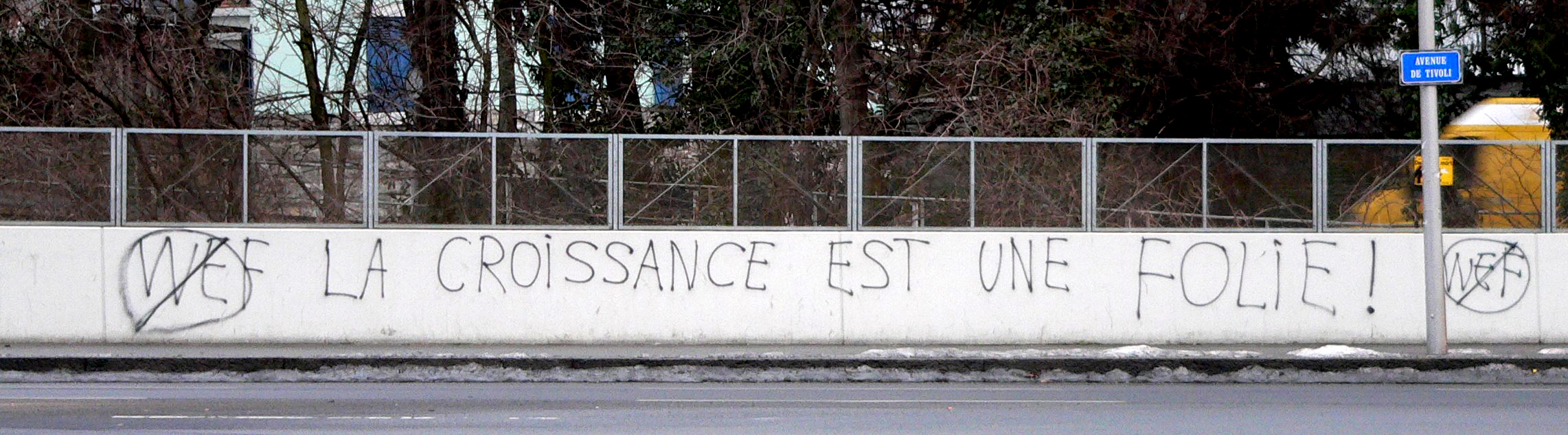
Anti-WEF graffiti in Lausanne. The writing reads: La croissance est une folie ("Growth is madness").

Several influential critical works have inspired the anti-globalization movement. No Logo, the book by the Canadian journalist Naomi Klein who criticized the production practices of multinational corporations and the omnipresence of brand-driven marketing in popular culture, has become a "manifesto" of the movement, presenting in a simple way themes more accurately developed in other works. In India, some intellectual references to the movement can be found in the works of Vandana Shiva, an ecologist and feminist, who in her book Biopiracy documents the way that the natural capital of indigenous peoples and ecoregions is converted into forms of intellectual capital, which are then recognized as exclusive commercial property without sharing the private utility thus derived. The writer Arundhati Roy is famous for her anti-nuclear position and her activism against India's massive hydroelectric dam project, sponsored by the World Bank. In France the well-known monthly paper Le Monde Diplomatique has advocated the anti-globalization cause, and an editorial of its director Ignacio Ramonet brought about the foundation of the association ATTAC. Susan George of the Transnational Institute has also been a long-term influence on the movement, as the writer of books since 1986 on hunger, debt, international financial institutions and capitalism. The works of Jean Ziegler, Christopher Chase-Dunn, and Immanuel Wallerstein have detailed underdevelopment and dependence in a world ruled by the capitalist system. Pacifist and anti-imperialist traditions have strongly influenced the movement. Critics of United States foreign policy such as Noam Chomsky, Susan Sontag, and anti-globalist pranksters The Yes Men are widely accepted inside the movement.

Although they may not recognize themselves as anti-globalists and are pro-capitalism, some economists who do not share the neoliberal approach of international economic institutions have strongly influenced the movement. Amartya Sen's Development as Freedom (Nobel Prize in Economics, 1999), argues that third-world development must be understood as the expansion of human capability, not simply the increase in national income per capita, and thus requires policies attuned to health and education, not simply GDP. James Tobin's (winner of the Nobel Prize in Economics) proposal for a tax on financial transactions (called, after him, the Tobin tax) has become part of the agenda of the movement. Also, George Soros, Joseph E. Stiglitz (another Economic Sciences Nobel prize winner, formerly of the World Bank, author of Globalization and Its Discontents), and David Korten have made arguments for drastically improving transparency, for debt relief, land reform, and restructuring corporate accountability systems. Korten and Stiglitz's contributions to the movement include involvement in direct actions and street protests.

In some Roman Catholic countries such as Italy there have been religious influences, especially from missionaries who have spent a long time in the Third World (the most famous being Alex Zanotelli).

Internet sources and free-information websites, such as Indymedia, are a means of diffusion of the movement's ideas. The vast array of material on spiritual movements, anarchism, libertarian socialism, and the Green Movement that is now available on the Internet has been perhaps more influential than any printed book.

== Organization ==
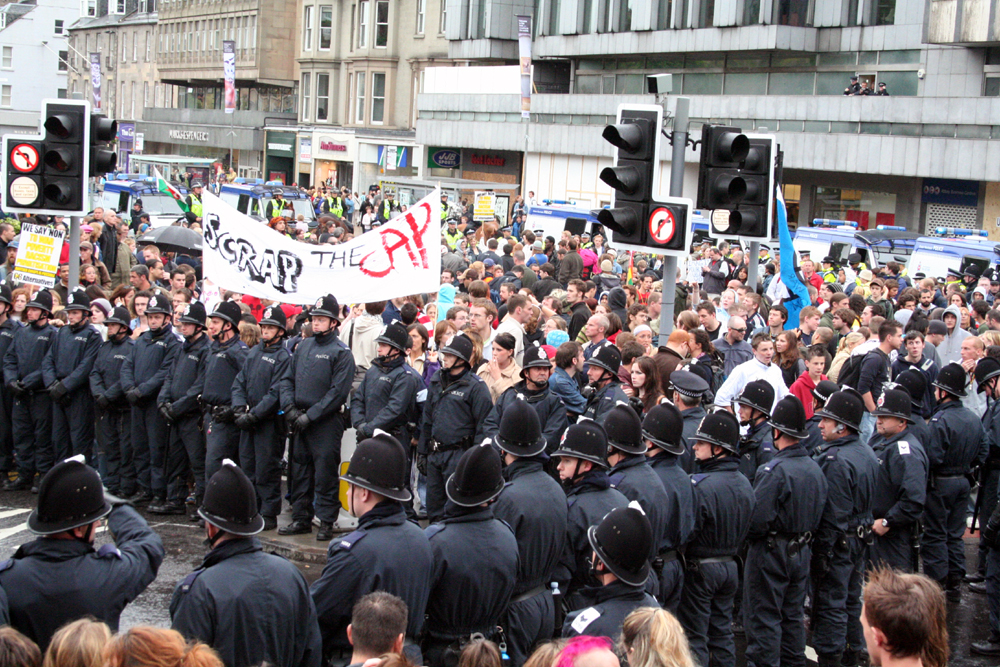
Anti-globalization protests in Edinburgh during the start of the 31st G8 summit

Although over the past years more emphasis has been given to the construction of grassroots alternatives to (capitalist) globalization, the movement's largest and most visible mode of organizing remains mass decentralized campaigns of direct action and civil disobedience. This mode of organizing, sometimes under the banner of the Peoples' Global Action network, tries to tie the many disparate causes together into one global struggle. In many ways, the process of organizing matters overall can be more important to activists than the avowed goals or achievements of any component of the movement.

At corporate summits, the stated goal of most demonstrations is to stop the proceedings. Although the demonstrations rarely succeed in more than delaying or inconveniencing the actual summits, this motivates the mobilizations and gives them a visible, short-term purpose. This form of publicity is expensive in police time and the public purse. Rioting has occurred at some protests, for instance in Genoa, Seattle, and London – and extensive damage was done to the area, especially targeting corporations, including McDonald's and Starbucks restaurants.

Despite, or perhaps because of, the lack of formal coordinating bodies, the movement manages to successfully organize large protests on a global basis, using information technology to spread information and organize. Protesters organize themselves into "affinity groups," typically non-hierarchical groups of people who live close together and share a common political goal. Affinity groups will then send representatives to planning meetings. However, because these groups can be infiltrated by law enforcement intelligence, important plans of the protests are often not made until the last minute. One common tactic of the protests is to split up based on willingness to break the law. This is designed, with varying success, to protect the risk-averse from the physical and legal dangers posed by confrontations with law enforcement. For example, in Prague during the anti-IMF and World Bank protests in September 2000 demonstrators split into three distinct groups, approaching the conference center from three directions: one engaging in various forms of civil disobedience (the Yellow march), one (the Pink/Silver march) advancing through "tactical frivolity" (costume, dance, theatre, music, and artwork), and one (the Blue march) engaging in violent conflicts with the baton-armed police, with the protesters throwing cobblestones lifted from the street.

These demonstrations come to resemble small societies in themselves. Many protesters take training in first aid and act as medics to other injured protesters. In the US, some organizations like the National Lawyer's Guild and, to a lesser extent, the American Civil Liberties Union, provide legal witnesses in case of law enforcement confrontation. Protesters often claim that major media outlets do not properly report on them; therefore, some of them created the Independent Media Center, a collective of protesters reporting on the actions as they happen.

== Key grassroots organizations ==
- Abahlali baseMjondolo in South Africa
- The EZLN in Mexico
- Fanmi Lavalas in Haiti
- The Homeless Workers' Movement in Brazil
- The Landless Peoples Movement in South Africa
- The Landless Workers' Movement in Brazil
- Movement for Justice en el Barrio in the United States of America
- Narmada Bachao Andolan in India
- The Western Cape Anti-Eviction Campaign in South Africa

== Demonstrations and appointments ==
=== Berlin88 ===
The Annual Meetings of the International Monetary Fund (IMF) and the World Bank, which took place in West Berlin in 1988, saw strong protests that can be categorized as a precursor of the anti-globalization movement. One of the main and failed objectives (as it was to be so many times in the future) was to derail the meetings.

=== Paris89 ===
During the July 1989 G7 summit in Paris, civil society groups mobilized to demand debt cancellation for developing countries. These protests coincided with France's increasing support for debt relief efforts. While anti-G7 activism grew during this period, the scale and direct influence of the 1989 protests remain less documented than later campaigns.

=== Madrid94 ===
The 50th anniversary of the IMF and the World Bank, which was celebrated in Madrid in October 1994, was the scene of a protest by an ad hoc coalition of what would later be called anti-globalization movements. Starting from the mid-1990s, Annual Meetings of the IMF and the World Bank Group have become center points for anti-globalization movement protests. They tried to drown the bankers' parties in noise from outside and held other public forms of protest under the motto "50 Years is Enough". While Spanish King Juan Carlos was addressing the participants in a huge exhibition hall, two Greenpeace activists climbed to the top and showered the attendants with fake dollar bills carrying the slogan "No $s for Ozone Layer Destruction". A number of the demonstrators were sent to the notorious Carabanchel prison.

=== J18 ===
One of the first international anti-globalization protests was organized in dozens of cities around the world on June 18, 1999, with those in London and Eugene, Oregon most often noted. The drive was called the Carnival Against Capital, or J18 for short. The day coincided with the 25th G8 Summit in Cologne, Germany. The protest in Eugene turned into a riot where local anarchists drove police out of a small park. One anarchist, Robert Thaxton, was arrested and convicted of throwing a rock at a police officer.

=== Seattle/N30 ===
The second major mobilization of the movement, known as N30, occurred on November 30, 1999, when protesters blocked delegates' entrance to WTO meetings in Seattle, Washington, USA. The protests forced the cancellation of the opening ceremonies and lasted the length of the meeting until December 3. There was a large, permitted march by members of the AFL–CIO, and other unauthorized marches by assorted affinity groups who converged around the Convention Center. The protesters and Seattle riot police clashed in the streets after police fired tear gas at demonstrators who blocked the streets and refused to disperse. Over 600 protesters were arrested and thousands were injured. Three policemen were injured by friendly fire, and one by a thrown rock. Some protesters destroyed the windows of storefronts of businesses owned or franchised by targeted corporations such as a large Nike shop and many Starbucks windows. The mayor put the city under the municipal equivalent of martial law and declared a curfew. As of 2002, the city of Seattle had paid over $200,000 in settlements of lawsuits filed against the Seattle Police Department for assault and wrongful arrest, with a class action lawsuit still pending.

=== Washington A16 ===
In April 2000, around 10,000 to 15,000 protesters demonstrated at the IMF, and World Bank meeting (official numbers are not tallied). International Forum on Globalization (IFG) held training at Foundry United Methodist Church. Police raided the Convergence Center, which was the staging warehouse and activists' meeting hall on Florida Avenue on April 15. The day before the larger protest scheduled on April 16, a smaller group of protesters demonstration against the Prison-Industrial Complex in the District of Columbia. Mass arrests were conducted; 678 people were arrested on April 15. Three-time Pulitzer Prize-winning, The Washington Post photographer Carol Guzy was detained by police and arrested on April 15, and two journalists for the Associated Press also reported being struck by police with batons. On April 16 and 17 the demonstrations and street actions around the IMF that followed, the number of those arrested grew to 1,300 people. A class action lawsuit was filed for false arrest. In June 2010, the class action suit for the April 15 events called 'Becker, et al. v. District of Columbia, et al..' were settled, with $13.7 million in damages awarded.

==== S11 ====
On September 11, 2000, a meeting of the World Economic Forum in Melbourne, Australia was disrupted for three days by up to 20,000 protesters. The WEF's Asia Pacific Economic Conference was opposed by a range of groups organising under the umbrella of the S11 alliance, which included anarchist, socialist, environmentalist and other social justice groups. Approximately twenty protesters were arrested and claims were made that 400 were injured by police, including fifty who needed to attend hospital.

=== Washington, D.C., 2002 ===
In September 2002, an estimated number of 1,500 to 2,000 people gathered to demonstrate against the annual meetings of IMF and World Bank in the streets of Washington, D.C. Protesting groups included the Anti-Capitalist Convergence, the Mobilization for Global Justice. 649 people were reported arrested, five were charged with destruction of property, while the others were charged with parading without a permit, or failing to obey police orders to disperse. At least 17 reporters were in the round-up. Protestors sued in Federal Court about the arrests. The D.C. Attorney General had outside counsel investigate the apparent destruction of evidence, and forensic investigations continue, and the testimony of the Chief of Police. In 2009, the city agreed to pay $8.25 million to almost 400 protesters and bystanders to end a class-action lawsuit over kettling and mass arrests in Pershing Park during 2002 World Bank protests

=== Law enforcement reaction ===
Although local police were surprised by the size of N30, law enforcement agencies have since reacted worldwide to prevent the disruption of future events by a variety of tactics, including sheer weight of numbers, infiltrating the groups to determine their plans, and preparations for the use of force to remove protesters.

At the site of some of the protests, police have used tear gas, pepper spray, concussion grenades, rubber and wooden bullets, night sticks, water cannons, dogs, and horses to repel the protesters. After the November 2000 G20 protest in Montreal, at which many protesters were beaten, trampled, and arrested in what was intended to be a festive protest, the tactic of dividing protests into "green" (permitted), "yellow" (not officially permitted but with little confrontation and low risk of arrest), and "red" (involving direct confrontation) zones was introduced.

In Quebec City, municipal officials built a 3-metre (10 ft) high wall around the portion of the city where the Summit of the Americas was being held, which only residents, delegates to the summit, and certain accredited journalists were allowed to pass through.

=== Gothenburg ===
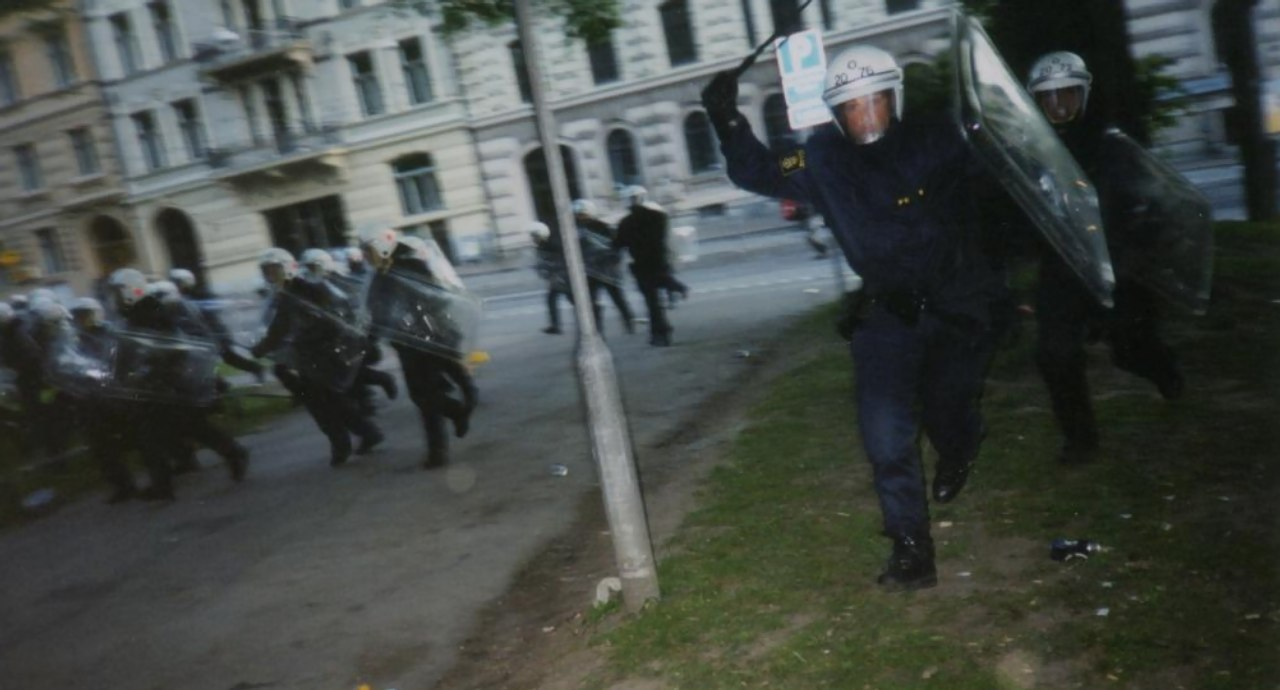
Attack of police during the riots in Gothenburg, June 15, 2001

On June 15 and 16, 2001, a strong demonstration took place in Gothenburg during the meeting of the European Council in the Swedish city, coinciding with protests against the simultaneous visit by George W Bush. Clashes between police and protestors were punctuated by vandalism by the extreme fringes of the demonstrators, the so-called black-blocs. Images of destruction bounced through the mass media, casting a shadow on the movement in the eyes of the public.

=== Genoa ===
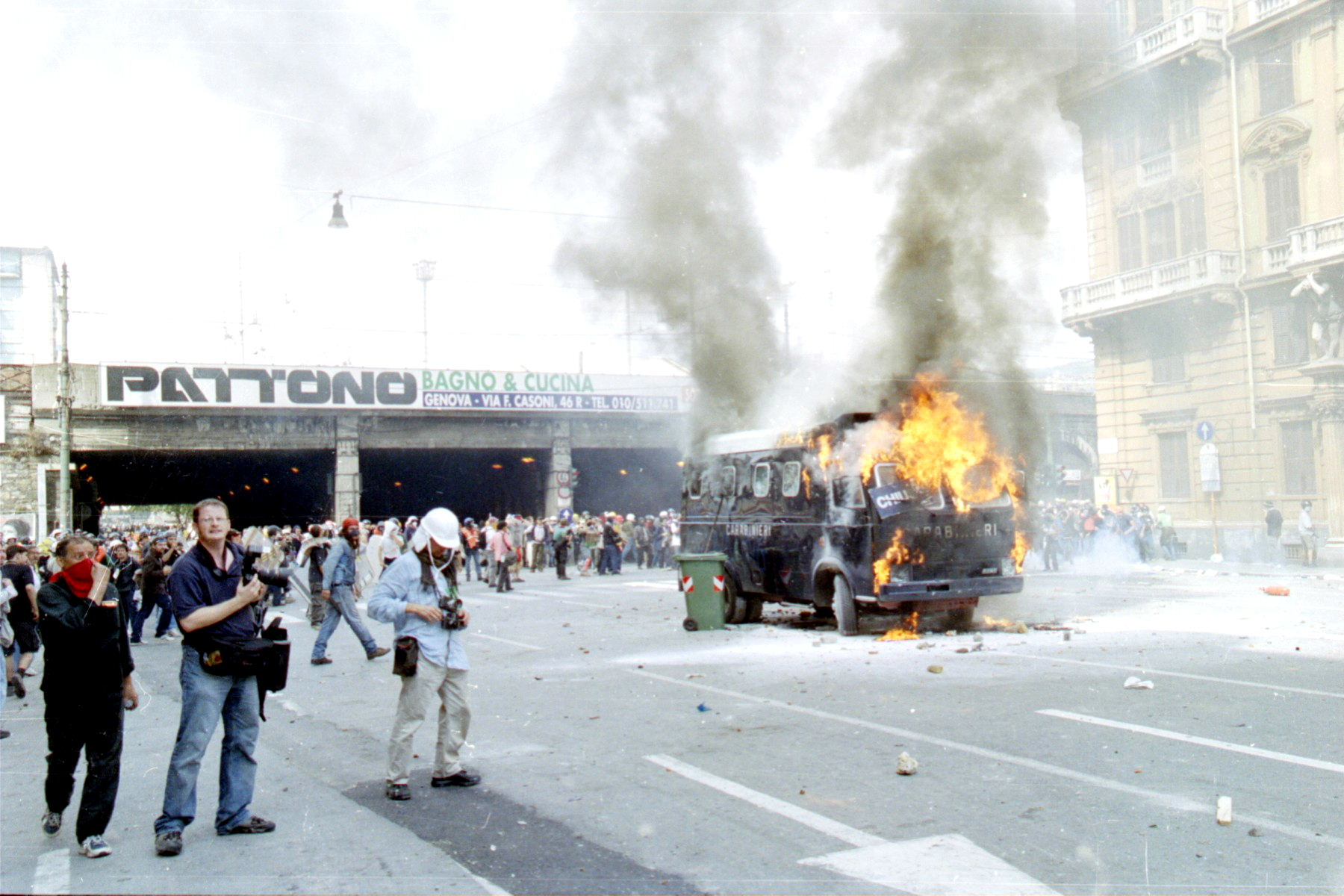
Protesters burning a Carabinieri vehicle in Genoa

The Genoa Group of Eight Summit protest from July 18 to 22, 2001, was one of the bloodiest protests in Western Europe's recent history, as evidenced by the wounding of hundreds of policemen and civilians forced to lock themselves inside their homes and the death of a young Genoese anarchist named Carlo Giuliani—who was shot while trying to throw a fire extinguisher on a policeman—during two days of violence and rioting by groups supported by the nonchalance of more consistent and peaceful masses of protesters, and the hospitalization of several of those peaceful demonstrators just mentioned. Police have subsequently been accused of brutality, torture and interference with the non-violent protests as collateral damage provoked by the clash between the law enforcement ranks themselves and the more violent and brutal fringes of protesters, who repeatedly hid themselves amongst peaceful protesters of all ages and backgrounds. Several hundred peaceful demonstrators, rioters, and police were injured and hundreds were arrested during the days surrounding the G8 meeting; most of those arrested have been charged with some form of "criminal association" under Italy's anti-mafia and anti-terrorist laws.

=== International social forums ===
The first World Social Forum (WSF) in 2001 was an initiative of Oded Grajew, Chico Whitaker, and Bernard Cassen. It was supported by the city of Porto Alegre (where it took place) and the Brazilian Workers' Party. The motivation was to constitute a counter-event to the World Economic Forum held in Davos at the same time. The slogan of the WSF is "Another World Is Possible". An International Council (IC) was set up to discuss and decide major issues regarding the WSF, while the local organizing committee in the host city is responsible for the practical preparations of the event. In June 2001, the IC adopted the World Social Forum Charter of Principles, which provides a framework for international, national, and local Social Forums worldwide.

The WSF became a periodic meeting: in 2002 and 2003 it was held again in Porto Alegre and became a rallying point for worldwide protest against the American invasion of Iraq. In 2004 it was moved to Mumbai, India), to make it more accessible to the populations of Asia and Africa. This Forum had 75,000 delegates. In 2006 it was held in three cities: Caracas, Venezuela; Bamako, Mali, and Karachi, Pakistan. In 2007, the Forum was hosted in Nairobi, Kenya, in 2009, it was in Belém, Brazil, and in 2011, it was in Dakar, Senegal. In 2012, the WSF returned to Porto Alegre.

The idea of creating a meeting place for organizations and individuals opposed to Neoliberalism was soon replicated elsewhere. The first European Social Forum (ESF) was held in November 2002 in Florence. The slogan was "Against the war, against racism and against neo-liberalism". It saw the participation of 60,000 delegates and ended with a huge demonstration against the war (1,000,000 people according to the organizers). The following ESFs took place in Paris (2003), London (2004), Athens (2006), Malmö (2008), and the latest ESF in Istanbul (2010).

In many countries Social Forums of national and local scope were also held.

Recently there has been some discussion behind the movement about the role of social forums. Some see them as a "popular university", an occasion to make many people aware of the problems of globalization. Others would prefer that delegates concentrate their efforts on the coordination and organization of the movement and on the planning of new campaigns. However, it has often been argued that in the dominated countries (most of the world) the WSF is little more than an 'NGO fair' driven by Northern NGOs and donors most of which are hostile to popular movements of the poor.

== Impact ==
The global justice movement has been quite successful in achieving some of its key aims, according to academic and global justice movement activist David Graeber. For example, many countries no longer rely on IMF loans and so, by the mid-2000s, IMF lending was at its lowest share of world GDP since the 1970s.

== Criticisms ==
=== Lack of evidence ===
Critics assert that the empirical evidence does not support the views of the anti-globalization movement. These critics point to statistical trends which are interpreted to be the results of globalization, capitalism, and the economic growth they encourage:

- There has been an absolute decrease in the percentage of people in developing countries living below $1 per day in East Asia (adjusted for inflation and purchasing power). Sub-Saharan Africa, as an area that felt the consequences of poor governance and was less responsive to globalization, has seen an increase in poverty while all other areas of the world have seen no change in rates.
- The world income per head has increased by more over period 2002–2007 than during any other period on the record.
- The increase in universal suffrage, from no nations in 1900 to 62.5% of all nations in 2000.
- There are similar trends for electric power, cars, radios, and telephones per capita as well as the percentage of the population with access to clean water; however, 2.6 billion of the world's population in 2008 lacked access to proper sanitation, and billions of people ("around 1 in 4 people") still live without clean drinking water as of 2020.

Members of the anti-globalization movement argue that positive data from countries that largely ignored neoliberal prescriptions, notably China, discredits the evidence that pro-globalists present. Concerning the parameter of per capita income growth, development economist Ha-Joon Chang argues that considering the record of the last two decades the argument for continuing neoliberal policy prescriptions are "simply untenable", and commented: "It depends on the data we use, but roughly speaking, per capita income in developing countries grew at 3% per year between 1960 and 1980, but has grown only at about 1.5% between 1980 and 2000. And even this 1.5% will be reduced to 1%, if we take out India and China, which have not pursued liberal trade and industrial policies recommended by the developed countries." Economist and political scientist Mark Pennington and NYU professor of economics William Easterly have individually accused Chang of employing strawman arguments, ignoring counter-data, and failing to employ basic scientific controls in his claims.

Economist Jagdish Bhagwati argues that reforms that opened up the economies of China and India contributed to their higher growth in the 1980s and 1990s. From 1980 to 2000 their GDP grew at average rate of 10 and 6 percent respectively. This was accompanied by reduction of poverty from 28 percent in 1978 to 9 percent in 1998 in China, and from 51 percent in 1978 to 26 percent in 2000 in India. Speaking not only on China but East Asia in general, economist Joseph Stiglitz commented: "The countries that have managed globalization on their own, such as those in East Asia, have, by and large, ensured that they reaped huge benefits and that those benefits were equitably shared; they were able substantially to control the terms on which they engaged with the global economy. By contrast, the countries that have, by and large, had globalization managed for them by the International Monetary Fund and other international economic institutions have not done so well." According to The Heritage Foundation, development in China was anticipated by Milton Friedman, who predicted that even a small progress towards economic liberalization would produce dramatic and positive effects. China's economy had grown together with its economic freedom. Critics of corporate-led globalization have expressed concern about the methodology used in arriving at the World Bank's statistics and argue that more detailed variables measuring poverty should be studied. According to the Center for Economic and Policy Research, the period from 1980 to 2005 has seen diminished progress in terms of economic growth, life expectancy, infant and child mortality, and to a lesser extent education.

=== Disorganization ===
One of the most common criticisms of the movement, which does not necessarily come from its opponents, is simply that the anti-globalization movement lacks coherent goals, and that the views of different protesters are often in opposition to each other. Many members of the movement are also aware of this, and argue that, as long as they have a common opponent, they should march together – even if they do not share exactly the same political vision. Writers Michael Hardt and Antonio Negri have together in their books (Empire and Multitude) expanded on this idea of a disunified multitude: humans coming together for shared causes, but lacking the complete sameness of the notion of "the people".

=== Lack of effectiveness ===
One argument often made by the opponents of the anti-globalization movement (especially by The Economist) is that one of the major causes of poverty amongst third-world farmers are the trade barriers put up by rich nations and poor nations alike. The WTO is an organization set up to work towards removing those trade barriers. Therefore, it is argued, people really concerned about the plight of the third world should actually be encouraging free trade, rather than attempting to fight it. Specifically, commodities such as sugar are heavily distorted by subsidies on behalf of powerful economies (the United States, Europe, and Japan), which have a disproportionate influence in the WTO. As a result, producers in these countries often receive two to three times the world market price. As Amani Elobeid and John Beghin note, the world price might decline by as much as 48% (by 2011–2012 baselines) were these distortions to be removed.

Many supporters of globalization think that policies different from those of today should be pursued, although not necessarily those advocated by the anti-globalization movement. For example, some see the World Bank and the IMF as corrupt bureaucracies which have given repeated loans to dictators who never do any reforms. Some, like Hernando De Soto, argue that much of the poverty in the Third World countries is caused by the lack of Western systems of laws and well-defined and universally recognized property rights. De Soto argues that because of the legal barriers, poor people in those countries can not utilize their assets to produce more wealth. Jeffrey Sachs who is a supporter of globalization and an initial advocate of neo-liberal shock therapy became a vocal critic of how globalization has been historically mismanaged by Western governments and advocates for a more inclusive, carefully planned and socially responsible model that shares its benefits more equitably across the developing world.

=== Lack of widespread support in developing countries ===
Critics have asserted that people from poor and developing countries have been relatively accepting and supportive of globalization while the strongest opposition to globalization has come from activists, unions, and NGOs in wealthier developed countries. Alan Shipman, author of The Globalization Myth, accuses the anti-globalization movement of "defusing the Western class war by shifting alienation and exploitation to developing-country sweatshops." He later goes on to claim that the anti-globalization movement has failed to attract widespread support from poor and working people from the developing nations, and that its "strongest and most uncomprehending critics had always been the workers whose liberation from employment they were trying to secure."

These critics assert that people from the Third World see the anti-globalization movement as a threat to their jobs, wages, consuming options and livelihoods, and that a cessation or reversal of globalization would result in many people in poor countries being left in greater poverty. Jesús F. Reyes Heroles, the former Mexican ambassador to the US, stated that "in a poor country like ours, the alternative to low-paid jobs isn't well-paid ones, it's no jobs at all."

Egypt's ambassador to the UN has also stated "The question is why all of a sudden, when third world labor has proved to be competitive, why do industrial countries start feeling concerned about our workers? When all of a sudden there is a concern about the welfare of our workers, it is suspicious."

However, there also have been notable protests against certain globalization policies by workers in developing nations, as in the cause of Indian farmers protesting against patenting seeds.

In the last few years, many developing countries (especially in Latin America and the Caribbean) created alter-globalization organizations such as the economic blocs Mercosur and Unasur, the Community of Latin American and Caribbean States, and Bank of the South, which support the development of low-income countries without involvement from the IMF or World Bank.

== See also ==
- Anti-capitalism
- Anti-consumerism
- Anti-corporate activism
- Anti-establishment
- Argentine economic crisis (1999–2002)
- Autonomist Marxism
- Black bloc
- Culture jamming
- Criticism of capitalism
- Criticisms of globalization
- Deglobalization
- Direct democracy
- Domestic sourcing
- Eco-socialism
- General Agreement on Tariffs and Trade (GATT)
- George Noory
- Globalism
- Global citizens movement
- Global labor arbitrage
- Green economy
- Internationalism (politics)
- Localism (politics)
- New antisemitism#Anti-globalization movement
- New World Order (conspiracy theory)
- New world order (politics)
- Reshoring
- Populism
  - Left-wing populism
  - Right-wing populism
- Right-wing antiglobalism
- Left-wing antiglobalism
- Shadow banking system
- Stop the City

=== Nongovernmental organizations ===
- Attac
- ¡Democracia Real YA!
- Food Not Bombs
- Green Mountain Anarchist Collective
- Occupy Wall Street

=== Publications ===
- Empire
- Globalization and Health
