= 25th G8 summit =

1999 international leader meeting in Germany

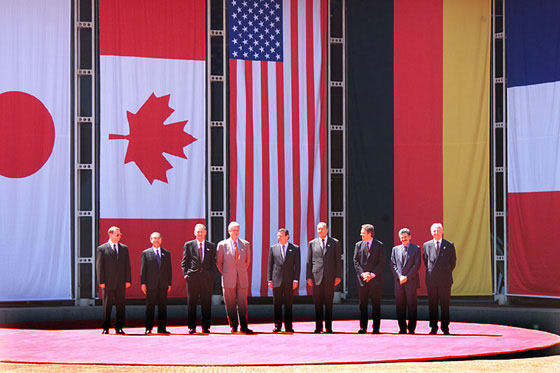
- Host country: Germany
- Dates: 18–20 June 1999
- Cities: Cologne
- Venues: Museum Ludwig
- Follows: 24th G8 summit
- Precedes: 26th G8 summit

The 25th G8 Summit was held in Cologne, Germany, on 18–20 June 1999. The venue for this summit meeting was the Museum Ludwig in the central city.

== Overview ==
The Group of Seven (G7) was an unofficial forum which brought together the heads of the richest industrialized countries: France, Germany, Italy, Japan, the United Kingdom, the United States, and Canada starting in 1976. The G8, meeting for the first time in 1997, was formed with the addition of Russia. In addition, the president of the European Commission has been formally included in summits since 1981. The summits were not meant to be linked formally with wider international institutions; and in fact, a mild rebellion against the stiff formality of other international meetings was a part of the genesis of cooperation between France's president Valéry Giscard d'Estaing and West Germany's chancellor Helmut Schmidt as they conceived the initial summit of the Group of Six (G6) in 1975.

The G8 summits since the late 1990s have inspired widespread debates, protests and demonstrations; and the two- or three-day event becomes more than the sum of its parts, elevating the participants, the issues and the venue as focal points for activist pressure. In 1999, a global Carnival Against Capital was organised by Peoples' Global Action. 4,000 people rioted in the City of London.

== Leaders at the summit ==
The G8 is an unofficial annual forum for the leaders of Canada, the European Commission, France, Germany, Italy, Japan, Russia, the United Kingdom, and the United States.

The 25th G8 summit was the first summit for German chancellor Gerhard Schröder and was the last summit for Russian president Boris Yeltsin. It was also the first and only summit for Italian prime minister Massimo D'Alema and Japanese prime minister Keizō Obuchi.

=== Participants ===
These summit participants are the current "core members" of the international forum:

**Core G8 members** Host state and leader are shown in bold text.
Member		Represented by	Title
(Canada)	Canada	Jean Chrétien	Prime Minister
(France)	France	Jacques Chirac	President
(Germany)	**Germany**	**Gerhard Schröder**	**Chancellor**
(Italy)	Italy	Massimo D'Alema	Prime Minister
(Japan)	Japan	Keizō Obuchi	Prime Minister
(Russia)	Russia	Boris Yeltsin	President
(Russia)	Russia	Sergei Stepashin	Prime Minister
(United Kingdom)	United Kingdom	Tony Blair	Prime Minister
(United States)	United States	Bill Clinton	President
(European Union)	European Union	Manuel Marín	Acting Commission President following the resignation of the Santer Commission
(European Union)	European Union	**Gerhard Schröder**	Council President

== Priorities ==
Traditionally, the host country of the G8 summit sets the agenda for negotiations, which take place primarily amongst multi-national civil servants in the weeks before the summit itself, leading to a joint declaration which all countries can agree to sign.

== Issues ==
The summit was intended as a venue for resolving differences among its members. As a practical matter, the summit was also conceived as an opportunity for its members to give each other mutual encouragement in the face of difficult economic decisions.

== Business opportunity ==
For some, the G8 summit became a profit-generating event; as for example, the official G8 Summit magazines which have been published under the auspices of the host nations for distribution to all attendees since 1998.

== Gallery of participating leaders ==
=== Core G8 participants ===
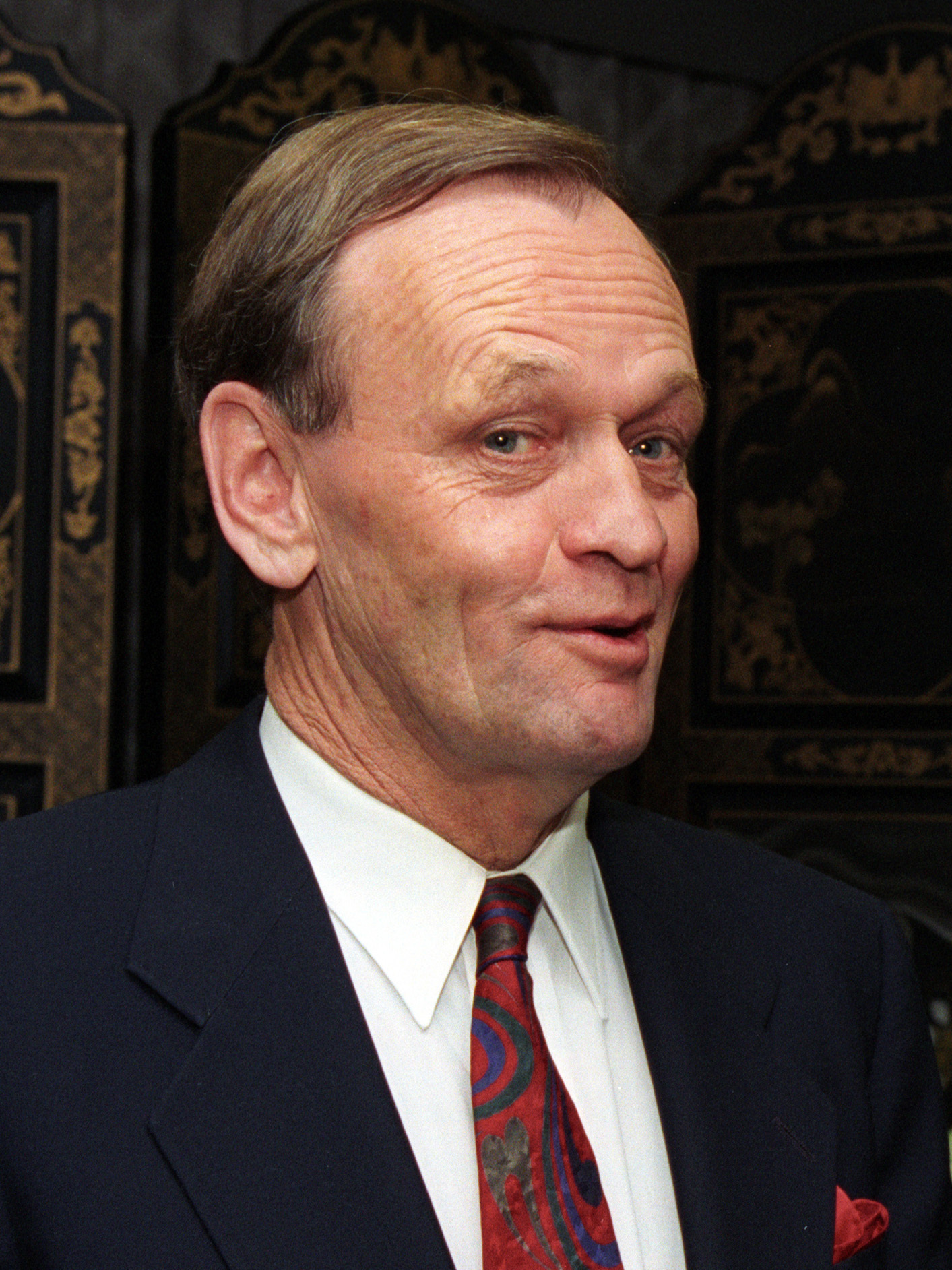
(Canada) Canada
Jean Chrétien,
Prime Minister

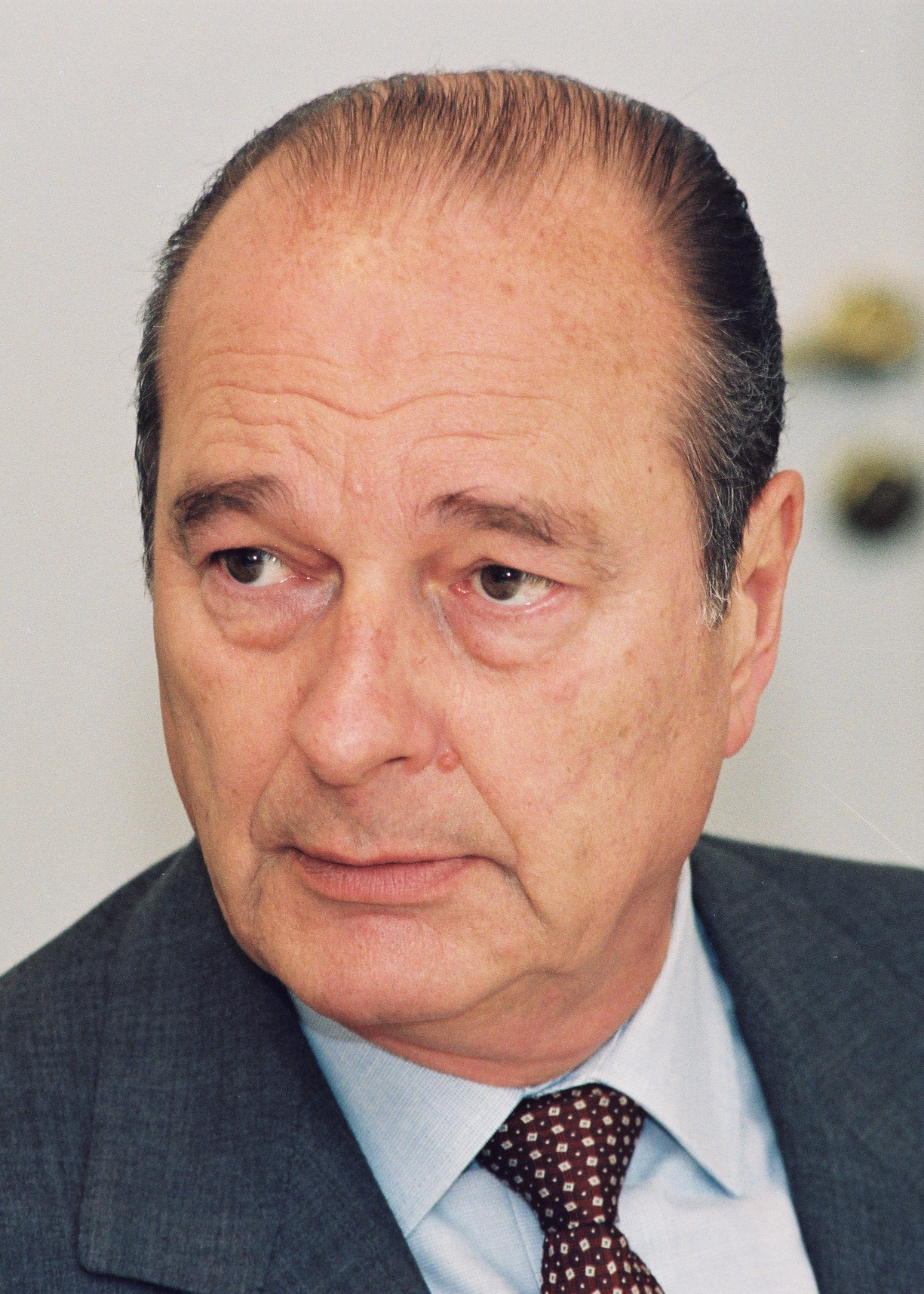
(France) France
Jacques Chirac,
President

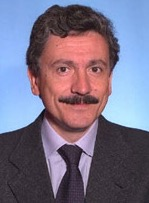
(Italy) Italy
Massimo D'Alema,
Prime Minister

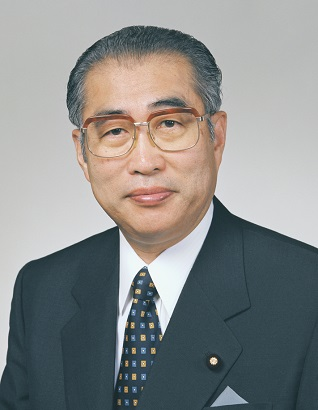
(Japan) Japan
Keizo Obuchi,
Prime Minister

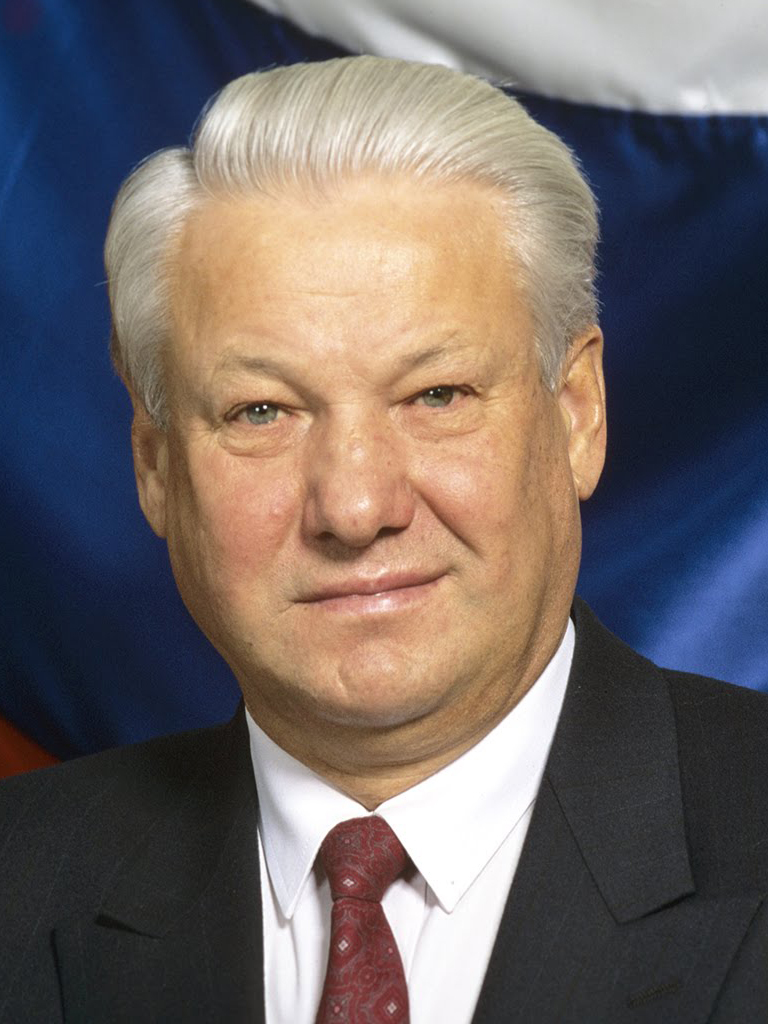
(Russia) Russia
Boris Yeltsin,
President

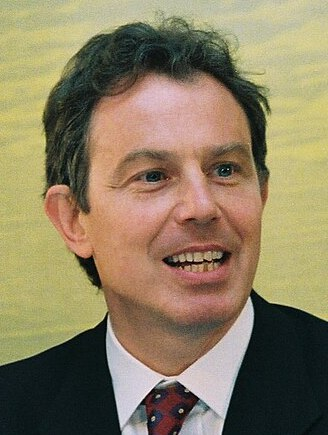
(United Kingdom) United Kingdom
Tony Blair,
Prime Minister

(United States) United States
Bill Clinton,
President
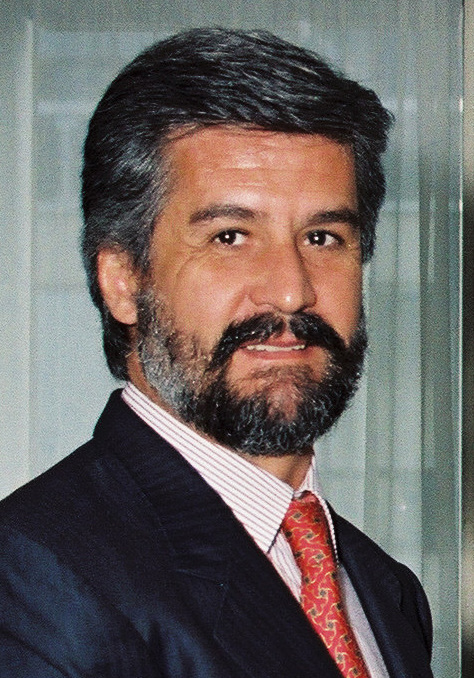
(European Union) European Union
Manuel Marín,
Acting Commission President
