= Bourbonese Qualk =

Experimental music group

- Miles Miles

Background information
- Origin: London, England
- Genres: Punk; industrial; experimental; techno
- Years active: 1980–2003
- Labels: Dossier; Praxis; Mannequin
- Spinoffs: Recloose Organisation; The State
- Members: Andy Wilson; Miles Miles; Owen Rossiter; Simon Crab
- Past members: Julian Gilbert; Kif Cole; Steven Tanza; Ted Crabtree
- Website: bourbonesequalk.net

Bourbonese Qualk was an experimental music group that existed from 1980 to 2003. The group participated in the early 1980s industrial & experimental music tape scene. Writing for CMJ, Martin Aston characterized Bourbonese Qualk as "post-punk, avant funk" along the lines of 23 Skidoo, A Certain Ratio, 400 Blows and early Cabaret Voltaire.

The group were also known for their political activism, having formed in the crucible of 1980s Britain amid such influences as the UK miners' strike, the Falklands War, Thatcherism, monetarism, local government corruption, squatting, anti-capitalism, anti-fascism, and anarchism. Their work was often ambiguous and directly critical of power-politics of any orientation, often irritating members of the traditional organized left. In 1984 Bourbonese Qualk occupied a large empty building - The Ambulance Station - on the Old Kent Road in South London, which they turned into a base for their activities, a cooperative space for artists, musicians, and writers, and a center for radical political activism -- specifically as a coordinating center for the Stop the City anti-capitalist protests of 1984.

== Discography ==
- Laughing Afternoon LP (Recloose Organization 1983)
- Hope LP (Recloose Organization 1984)
- The Spike LP (Dossier 1985)
- Preparing For Power LP (Recloose Organization 1986)
- Bourbonese Qualk LP (New International Recordings 1987)
- My Government is My Soul LP/CD (Fünfundvierzig 1990)
- Bo'Qu LP (New International Recordings 1990)
- Kneejerk Reaction EP (Praxis 1992)
- Qual EP (Praxis 1992)
- UnPop CD (Total F.I. 1993)
- Feeding the Hungry Ghost CD (Fünfundvierzig 1994)
- Autonomia CD (Praxis 1994)
- On Uncertainty (2000)
- Moscow (2002)
- Lies (2015)
