= Carnival Against Capital =

1999 international day of protest

The Carnival Against Capital (also known as J18) was an international day of protest on Friday, 18 June 1999, timed to coincide with the 25th G8 summit in Cologne, Germany. The carnival was inspired by the 1980s Stop the City protests, Peoples' Global Action and the Global Street Party, which happened at the same time as the 1998 24th G8 Summit in Birmingham. The rallying slogan was Our Resistance is as Transnational as Capital.

In London, a spoof newspaper was produced, alongside other publicity. The day itself featured a Critical Mass and an action by the Campaign Against Arms Trade, before a large march converged in different streams upon the London International Financial Futures and Options Exchange for a street party. Globally there were protests in over 40 cities, including Barcelona, Montevideo, Port Harcourt and San Francisco. Using then new technology, the protests were reported on the internet by independent media activists from London and Sydney, in a step towards the Indymedia network.

== Context ==
In 1983 and 1984, Stop the City demonstrations in London had attempted to blockade the City of London. In planning to contest the 25th G8 summit in Germany, activists connected through Peoples' Global Action decided to make a network of global protests. Preparations took many months and the day became known as simply J18. Groups involved included labour, environmentalist, feminist, anti-capitalist, animal rights and anarchist.

In London, the open organising group met every month. The day was also discussed in the open weekly meetings of London Reclaim the Streets. There were between 30 and 100 people at these discussions. The slogan for the event became Our Resistance is as Transnational as Capital. An international email discussion list was set up. Fund-raising was carried out by collecting anonymous donations and running a series of benefit gigs. A contributor to the Days of Dissent magazine later wrote: "There is only so much that can be learned from how J18 was organised. J18 and the many other successful anti-capitalist events in recent history were produced by a free flowing convergence of events and political currents combined with sheer luck."

RTS flyer for J18

In London, a concerted publicity campaign was carried out, using colourful stickers and 10,000 posters. Workers were encouraged to phone in sick. An eighteen-minute promotional video was made and distributed globally. Squaring up to the Square Mile was a 32-page pamphlet produced by Reclaim the Streets and Corporate Watch which gave details of financial institutions. An A3 map of the City of London (the "Square Mile") showed where they were located. 4,000 copies were produced.

On 29 January 1999 the Daily Mirror ran a full-page article entitled "Police spy bid to smash the anti-car protesters." Closer to the day, stories abounded in the media about possible violent scenarios. All leave was cancelled for City of London Police officers on 18 June. The Corporation of London wrote to companies warning of disruption and suggesting extra security measures.

== London ==
In London, there was a large march planned for midday and autonomous actions in the morning. A Critical Mass bicycle ride brought the City of London traffic to a standstill in rush hour. The Campaign Against Arms Trade closed down a Lloyds bank with a 'die-in'. The Association of Autonomous Astronauts began their 10-day festival Space 1999: Ten Days Which Shook The Universe with a blockade of the Lockheed Martin offices at Berkeley Square. The electronic civil disobedience group called for a virtual sit-in of the Mexican embassy in solidarity with the Zapatista Army of National Liberation and brought the embassy website to a standstill.

A spoof version of the Evening Standard daily newspaper called Evading Standards was produced. 30,000 copies of were printed and distributed to City workers on 17 and 18 June. The cover resembled the layout of the actual newspaper and the inner pages contained agitprop and humorous articles. The newspaper was handed out for free. The headline read 'Global Market Meltdown', followed by a spoof report of the collapse of the world's financial markets.

=== The march ===
At twelve, the protesters met at Liverpool Street train station. Food Not Bombs and Veggies Catering Campaign gave out free food and a samba band played.

Carnival masks were distributed in four different colours, namely green, gold, black and red. On the inside of the masks, the following text was written:

Those in authority fear the mask for their power partly resides in identifying, stamping and cataloguing: in knowing who you are. But a Carnival needs masks, thousands of masks...Masking up releases our commonality, enables us to act together...During the last years the power of money has presented a new mask over its criminal face. Disregarding borders, with no importance given to race or colours, the power of money humiliates dignities, insults honesties and assassinates hopes. On the signal follow your colour. Let the Carnival begin...

Five processions set off in different directions (there were four marches planned and another occurred spontaneously). The spontaneous procession erupted in anger at London Wall when a woman was hit by a reversing police van and had her leg broken.

Between two and three o'clock, the marches came together and an estimated 5,000 people converged on the London International Financial Futures Exchange (LIFFE). A fire hydrant was set off, symbolising the freeing of the Walbrook river, and the lower entrance to the LIFFE was bricked up. Banners were hung, reading Global Ecology Not Global Economy, and The Earth Is A Common Treasury For All, the latter a quote from Gerrard Winstanley of the seventeenth century Diggers movement. Graffiti messages were sprayed and CCTV cameras were disabled. Then sound systems set up and drum & bass music and punk bands played. In the early afternoon a small group of protesters broke into the Cannon Bridge building, smashed up the reception area and tried to access the LIFFE trading floor, but were prevented by a security screen.

We'd failed in our under-ambition. Unprepared, we never imagined we could get so close to occupying a trading floor in one of the City’s major exchanges. We'd planned the wall, and built it. We'd planned to free the Walbrook, and done it. But we’d stopped short of planning a full-scale occupation.

— "Wat Tyler"

The rest of the afternoon became a battle as police using horses and personal incapacitant spray containing CS gas pushed the protesters down Lower Thames Street and out of the City of London. In the aftermath, protesters gathered peacefully in Trafalgar Square.

== Global ==
Writing in Z magazine, Katherine Ainger described the global protests, which were "as diverse as the groups taking part". There were street parties in Barcelona and San Francisco. Politician Kim Beazley was custard pied in Melbourne for participating in a conference set up by Shell, whilst in Sydney there was another street party. In Nigeria, 10,000 people took to the streets of Port Harcourt and blockaded the Royal Dutch Shell offices. A street was renamed in honour of Ken Saro-Wiwa and his younger brother Owens addressed the crowd. A march shut down the stock exchange in Montevideo, Uruguay and ended with the burning of a model television set. In total there were protests worldwide in 40 countries, in cities including Tel Aviv, Minsk, Madrid, Valencia, Prague, Hamburg, Cologne, Milan, Rome, Siena, Florence, Ancona, Amsterdam, Glasgow, Edinburgh, Lancaster, Zurich, Geneva, Toronto, Vancouver, Ottawa, Washington D.C., New York, Los Angeles, Austin (Texas), Boston, and Eugene (Oregon).

== Internet coverage ==
The event was covered by live streaming and internet citizen journalism, which at the time were both new technologies. In London, the day's events were transmitted live over the internet. In Australia, a team worked to create all day coverage, collecting stories, photos and videos from activists and publishing them in a news feed. The global activist teamwork formed the basis of what would become the Indymedia network.

== Aftermath ==
In the United Kingdom, a total of sixteen people were arrested on the day. The Metropolitan Police made a website listing 138 photographs of those wanted for further questioning. Using CCTV footage extensively, they had arrested a further 50 people one year on. A protester pleaded guilty in January 2004 to Section 20 unlawful wounding (grievous bodily harm) and two violent disorder charges, plus an additional charge of skipping bail in 2000. He received a 4 1/2-year sentence. In Eugene, Oregon Rob Thaxton was sentenced to 88 months in jail after throwing a rock at a police officer while trying to avoid being arrested.

J18 was the first in a line of huge anti-capitalist and anti-globalisation protests. Others included the 1999 Seattle WTO protests, the protests in Prague during the 2000 International Monetary Fund (IMF) and World Bank summit and the 2001 protests against the 27th G8 summit in Genoa.

=== Reflections ===
- On 23 June 1999 Undercurrents, the alternative news organisation, premiered a 30-minute documentary in Oxford about the day produced from the pooled footage of a dozen video operators in London. The documentary was shown at festivals and social centres all over the UK during the following months.
- A pamphlet entitled Reflections on June 18 with 18 contributions was published in October 1999.
- A comic history of the day was produced by SchNEWS.

== See also ==
- Anti-globalization movement
- Earth First!
- Peoples' Global Action
- Tactical frivolity
- List of demonstrations against corporate globalization
