= Health Alliance International =

Health Alliance International (HAI) was a non-profit organization based in Seattle, Washington, USA. HAI was an international public health organization, and a center of the University of Washington Department of Global Health, that worked in Mozambique, East Timor, and Côte d'Ivoire. HAI focused on supporting government Ministries of Health to expand services at a national level in order to boost the overall health infrastructure of a country, and to strengthen its ability to provide sustainable sector-wide services. HAI was notable for its focus on a sector-wide approach to supporting health systems, rather than working "vertically" and independently of the local government.

== History ==
HAI was founded in 1987 by Steve Gloyd. In Mozambique, HAI supported the Ministry of Health in building the country's HIV/AIDS treatment services. In East Timor, HAI supported the Ministry of Health to strengthen the country's maternal and newborn care services. HAI also had a history of advocacy for the right to health for the poor.
