= Peoples' Global Action =

International anti-globalist collective

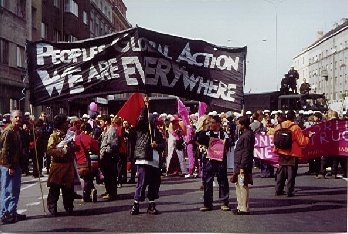
Peoples' Global Action demonstrators in Prague in September 2000

Peoples' Global Action (PGA) was the name of a worldwide co-ordination of radical social movements, grassroots campaigns and direct actions in resistance to capitalism and for social and environmental justice in the late 1990s and early 2000s. PGA was part of the anti-globalization movement.

== History ==
The initial inspiration for the formation of PGA came from a global meeting called in 1996 by the Zapatista Army of National Liberation (EZLN).

The Zapatistas called for a gathering, called an 'encuentro' (encounter), of international grassroots movements to meet in specially constructed arenas in the Chiapas jungle to discuss common tactics, problems and solutions. Six thousand people attended, from over 40 countries, and declared that they would form "a collective network of all our particular struggles and resistances... an intercontinental network of resistance against neoliberalism... (and) for humanity".

In August 1997, the European Zapatista support network called for a Second 'Encuentro' in Spain, which it had planned with the Zapatistas during the 1996 encuentro. Delegates came again of movements from around the world, such as the Brazilian Landless Workers' Movement (MST) who occupies unused land to create farms, and the other Karnataka Rajya Raitha Sangha-KRRS (Karnataka State Farmers Association) from India, renowned for their "cremate Monsanto" campaign, which involved burning fields of genetically modified crops.

In February 1998, movements from all continents met again, this time in Geneva, where Peoples' Global Action was launched.

== Horizontalist structure and organizing model ==
The PGA used a horizontalist form of organizing, influenced by anarchist political models that saw the means and the ends as aligned. In part its structure and mode of organizing was developed as a critique of 'vertical' or authoritarian movements.

== Major activities ==
Peoples' Global Action had three main types of activities. Global Days of Action, Intercontinental/International and Regional Conferences, and Caravans through which activists from one part of the world, would travel to another part of the world to build solidarity.

== Global Days of Action ==
So far, PGA's major function has been to serve as a political space for coordinating decentralised Global Action Days around the world, to highlight the global resistance of popular movements to capitalist globalisation. The first Global Action Days, during the second WTO ministerial conference in Geneva in May 1998, involved tens of thousands of people in more than 60 demonstrations and street parties on five continents.

Subsequent Global Action Days have included the Carnival Against Capital (June 18, 1999), the 3rd World Trade Organization summit in Seattle, US (November 30, 1999), the International Monetary Fund / World Bank meeting in Prague, Czech Republic (September 26, 2000), the G8 meeting in Genoa, Italy (June 21, 2000) the 4th WTO summit in Qatar (November 9, 2001), etc.

== Conferences ==
Groups involved in PGA have also organised global and regional conferences, workshops and other events in many regions of the world. Since the 1998 event in Geneva, Global PGA conferences have been held before WTO ministerials: in Bangalore, India (1999), and in Cochabamba, Bolivia (2001). Regional Conferences have been held in Europe (Athens, Milan, Belgrade, Barcelona, Dijon, Leiden), Mexico, Nicaragua, Panama, Brazil, Bangladesh, New Zealand (Aotearoa) and the United States.

=== European Conference in 2008 ===
A Peoples' Global Action gathering in Europe took place from August 19 to September 3, in France, in a decentralised fashion in 2006. The first nine days were distributed over five sites, each with specific themes, while the last five days took place in a central location, the autonomous space Les Tanneries in Dijon.

== Caravans ==
In 1999, the PGA organized an Intercontinental Caravan that brought 450 representatives of grassroots movements from the Global South (particularly India, but also Brazil, Mexico, Bangladesh and Chile) to visit 12 European countries, meet with grassroots European movements and conduct joint solidarity actions. The "Totally Crazy Project" was initiated by MD Nanjundaswamy and European activists.

An interview with an Indian participant from Karnataka Rajya Raitha Sangha (KRRS), explained,

We took part in 63 direct actions and 85 public meetings, and visited 38 farms ending at the G8 summit in Köln, Germany. In France we uprooted a GM rice trial with René Riesel and José Bové of the radical Confédération Paysanne (French Farmers Union), who were arrested and sentenced to 6 months imprisonment. In Geneva we marched at the WTO office, shouting "Kill the WTO". In Rome we protested at the FAO headquarters, and at the G8 Summit in Germany we engaged in a laughing protest as part of a global day of action.

In 1999, there were two caravans of activists in the leadup to the anti–World Trade Organization (WTO) conference in Seattle One travelled across the U.S., including activists from Chiapas, Mexico, the other across Canada. The later ended at the congress organised by the non-partisan International Forum on Globalisation, described by De Fabel van de illegaal as a right-wing elite think tank.

== Criticism ==
=== Right wing anti-globalization ===
The first version of the first PGA hallmark called for "A very clear rejection of the WTO and other trade liberalisation agreements (like APEC, the EU, NAFTA, etc.) as active promoters of a socially and environmentally destructive globalisation". This was critiqued for being too broad, and allowing the participation of right wing/nationalist movements within the PGA. Some criticized the participation of Mike Dolan, who worked for Ralph Nader's Public Citizen consumer watchdog group, who raised funds for the PGA Caravan, and who later spoke in support of the right-wing presidential candidate Pat Buchanan. Dolan sent around a newspaper article in which Buchanan openly says: "American workers and people first." When Dolan's actions and viewpoint were criticised from the grassroots level, Michael Morrill, the coordinator of the American PGA caravan, took his side. "Let's work together when we can, work in parallel when we must, but never work against each other when our goal is the elimination of the WTO and its corporate benefactors."

As a result, the PGA Hallmarks were edited in order to make opposition to capitalism, colonialism, racism and patriarchy more explicit.

Nonetheless, until at least 2004, PGA events continued to attract right wing anti-globalist activists. The 2004 European PGA conference in Jajinci, Belgrade, agreed that "a fascist coming as an interested individual, respecting the hallmarks and whose behaviour during the conference was fine wouldn't be a problem." Although a rider was subsequently added, this controversy was fuelled by the sympathies held by Leonid Savin (the co-ordinator of the Ukraine PGA info-point) with politics of Alexander Dugin. After Savin was shown to be an activist associated with the Eurasia Party, the PGA Ukraine info-point was removed from the PGA website. See also National anarchism.

=== Racism ===
The PGA, like the global justice movement more generally, was criticized for racism and Eurocentrism. One important intervention argued that people of color were marginalized in the Seattle mobilisation against the World Trade Organization.

In 2001, Raj Patel and Kala Subbuswamy discussed the problem of groups like the PGA in dealing with issues of race:

The principles of decentralisation and autonomy adopted by many within radical movements can also, unintentionally and remediably, be exclusionary. Many radical groups have anarchist principles behind them - non-hierarchical, consensus decision-making, often no formal structure. One problem with this is that it is often used to dismiss talk of what 'the movement' can do about issues of race and gender, on the grounds that we're not a movement, we're a collection of individuals and so we can't make decisions about the 'movement'. But UK EF!, or Peoples' Global Action, for example *are* movements, or at least networks with informal hierarchies and structures and unwritten rules. Every action involves a decision and a choice and it is important that these are open. For example, saying that we cannot exclude fascists from gatherings involves a choice - if people are allowed to say overtly racist comments, you exclude people of color, or at least prevent any chance of us feeling comfortable. This why at its last conference made explicit moves to overtly condemn discrimination

In 2002, Maria Theresa Santana, Chairperson of Moyo wa Taifa (UK) - Pan-Afrikan Women's Association attended the European PGA Conference in Leiden and expressed her anger at the Eurocentric standpoint of the PGA discussions.

At the PGA regional conference in Panama (August 2003), further concerns were raised that despite anti-hierarchical intentions, a leadership was emerging which only occasionally "got down the informations to their bases", that decisions were being made by meetings in Europe "that Europeans were imposing their political reality and way to work", and that prominent activists were promoting sexist attitudes rooted in religious fundamentalism.

== Participating organizations ==
The following organizations were amongst those who participated in PGA conferences, caravans or global days of action.

=== Asia ===
Karnataka Rajya Raitha Sangha, KRRS Bharatiya Kisan Union (BKU) Narmada Bachoa Andolan Bangladesh Krishok Federation (BKF) All Nepal Women's Association Assembly of the Poor, Movement for National Land and Agricultural Reform (MONLAR) - Sri Lanka Borneo Indigenous Peoples' and Peasants Union (Panggau), Sarawak, Malaysia.

=== Latin America ===
Brazil -Movimento dos Trabalhadores Rurais Sem Terra (MST), CAVE - Coletivo Alternativa Verde, Movimento Negro Unificado, Rede Libertária da Baixada Santista, O Centro de Cultura Social de São Paulo, Ação Local por Justiça Global

Ecuador - CONFEUNASSC-CNC, CONAIE, Movimiento de Mujeres Negras de Quito

Bolivia - Coordinadora Defensa del Agua y la Vida, COCAMTROP (El Comité de Coordinación de las seis Federaciones Campesinas de los Trópicos), Confederación Latinoamericana de Trabajadoras del Hogar.(FENATRAHOB)

Colombia - El Proceso de Comunidades Negras (PCN), SINTRAEMCALI Sindicato de Trabajadores de las Empresas Municipales de Cali (Workers Union of Cali Municipal Enterprises);

Honduras ONECA/ODECO

== See also ==
- Carnival Against Capitalism
- Reclaim the Streets
