= Ambulance Station, Southwark =

Coordinates: 51°29′17″N 0°4′37″W

The Ambulance Station
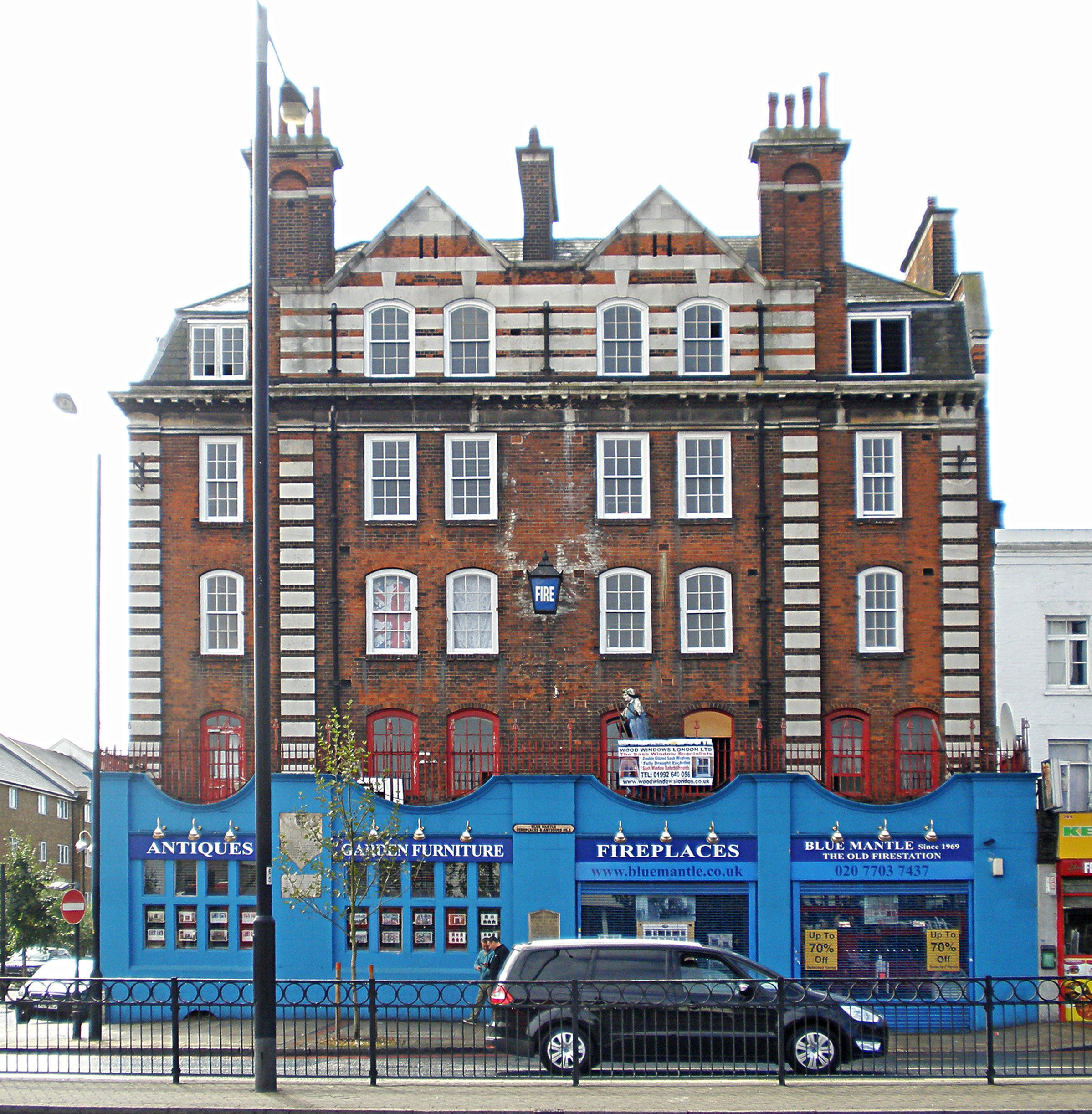
- The building as of 2014
- Interactive map of the The Ambulance Station area

General information
- Location: 306 Old Kent Road, Southwark, SE1, London, United Kingdom
- Year built: 1903-04
- Opened: 1984
- Closed: 1986

Design and construction
- Designations

Listed Building – Grade II
- Designated: 27 Apr 1989
- Reference no.: 1385738

The Ambulance Station was a music venue that hosted punk, post-punk, indie and experimental music bands. It was located within a squatted building on the Old Kent Road in the London Borough of Southwark during the mid-1980s, and was set up by the experimental music group Bourbonese Qualk.

== History ==
The building, designed by W. E. Riley, was built as a fire station by London County Council between 1903 and 1904. It replaced an older engine-house from 1869. The council acquired the neighbouring buildings to this older station and demolished them all to make space for the new one. Once constructed, it was in use by the Fire Brigade until 1969, when it was closed after a new station was built on Cooper's Road. It is Grade II listed.

Anarchist music group Bourbonese Qualk set up The Ambulance Station in the then abandoned five-story building at 306 Old Kent Road. The top two floors of the squat were converted into artist studios. There were living quarters on the middle floor. The first floor included a cafe and meeting places for local anarchist groups. The ground floor was a large performance space, a recording studio, and print workshops.

Canadian hardcore punk band D.O.A played a benefit for anarchist prisoners there on 29 February 1984.

The 1984 Stop the City demonstration was planned in a meeting at the building. The squat also organised a benefit gig which raised £300 and saw performances by Flux of Pink Indians, Kukl (featuring a teenaged Björk) and Flowers in the Dustbin.

Scottish post-punk band The Jesus & Mary Chain played there on 23 November 1984, often given as an example of their early gigs ending with tension, "riots" or violence. Also playing that night were The June Brides and Revolving Paint Dream. It was the first time seeing the Mary Chain for Geoff Travis after which he signed them to Blanco y Negro. Members of The Go-Betweens were present.

C86 band Stump played their first gig there on 24 August 1985.

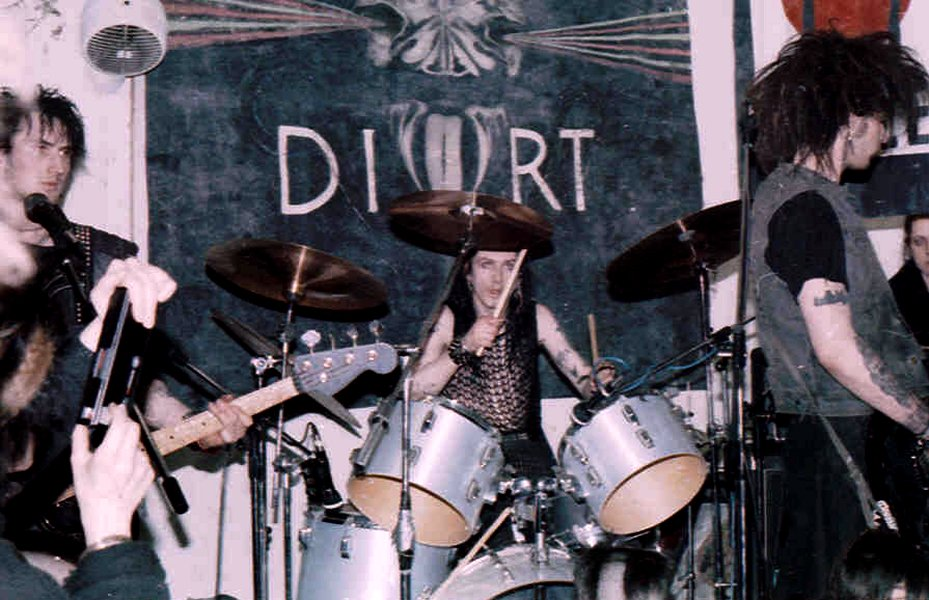
Antisect performing at The Ambulance Station in 1985

Other bands to play included The Television Personalities, Chumbawamba, Pulp, The Mekons, The Wedding Present, Felt, Conflict, Crass, The Butthole Surfers, Primal Scream, The Boo Radleys, Swans, Antisect, Biff Bang Pow!, Jasmine Minks, The Revolving Paint Dream, and King Kurt.
