= Casimira Rodríguez =

Bolivian politician

Minister of Justice
- In office January 2006 – February 2007
- President: Evo Morales
- Succeeded by: Celima Torrico

Personal details
- Born: 21 October 1966 (age 59)
- Occupation: Politician; Trade unionist

Casimira Rodríguez (born 1966) was the Bolivian Justice Minister from February 2006 until January 23, 2007. She is a former leader in the Domestic Workers' Union, which she helped found. Rodríguez was Bolivia's first indigenous Quechua woman to serve as a government minister.

== Career ==
At the age of 13 she was taken—essentially kidnapped—from her rural village in Mizque and brought to the city of Cochabamba to work, with the promise that she would be given in return the schooling and care her campesino parents could not provide. Instead, her supposed employers held Rodríguez in abusive servitude for two years, forcing her to work long hours with no pay.

When she was 21 she became involved with the group which would become the Domestic Workers’ Union of Cochabamba. This led to become a founding member of the Domestic Workers Federation in 1985; it also led to her later election as the leader of the National Federation of Domestic Workers in Bolivia. She was instrumental in the creation and passage of the Domestic Workers’ Protection Law, which Congress approved in 2003.

=== Politics ===
In February 2006 Rodríguez became Bolivia's new Minister of Justice. She was replaced in a cabinet change in January 2007. She was the first indigenous Quechua woman to serve as a government minister. During her ministry one focus was to elevate the role of "indigenous justice" (also known as "community justice") to a higher level.

In June 2015, she was appointed Departmental Secretary for Human Development of the Autonomous Departmental Government of Cochabamba.

=== Awards and recognition ===
The World Methodist Peace Prize was awarded to Rodríguez in 2003 recognising her "courage, creativity and perseverance in the fight for the labor and legal rights of domestic workers in Bolivia".

In 2007 Rodríguez was elected to the Ashoka Fellowship for her work in "...breaking the pattern of exploitation, trafficking, and discrimination suffered by more than 150,000 Bolivian domestic workers". She has been outspoken about the lack of rights for undocumented domestic workers in the USA.
