= Sector-Wide Approach =

Approach to international development

Sector-Wide Approach (SWAp) is an approach to international development that "brings together governments, donors and other stakeholders within any sector. It is characterized by a set of operating principles rather than a specific package of policies or activities. The approach involves movement over time under government leadership towards broadening policy dialogue; developing a single sector policy (that addresses private and public sector issues) and a common realistic expenditure program; common monitoring arrangements; and more coordinated procedures for funding and procurement." (World Health Organization, World Health Report 2000).

SWAp's are represented in the basic principles of programme-based approaches (PBAs), which must form 66% of aid from signatories to the Paris Declaration on Aid Effectiveness. While research in sectors, such as in agriculture, demonstrate improvements in process and dialogue there is a debate over whether these results are substantial enough to justify the investment. This concern has created a fatigue amongst certain policymakers. SWAp principles are also threatened by shifts in the source of international aid, with the growing importance of Brazil, China and NGOs such as the Gates Foundation.

== Criticisms ==
The problem of implementing the sector wide approaches (SWAPs) is the top-down policy, which is the most common cause of the aid ineffectiveness (aiding democracy abroad - Thomas Carothers)

=== SWAps in Agriculture ===
Specifically in agriculture SWAp has produced very limited increases in aid effectiveness. Problems include:

1. narrow ownership;
2. a failure to coordinate all relevant sector players;
3. excessive emphasis on systems, processes and institutional capacity-building initiatives has made service delivery a secondary concern while turning SWAps into expensive experiments.

These problems are argued by researchers at the Overseas Development Institute to be caused by a variety of political, institutional and operational factors.

- Political factors: SWAps sought to address aid management concerns (e.g. aid fragmentation and donor harmonisation), but this has created a donor-centred processes which often fails to involve the recipients. Furthermore, even if all parties are involved, ideological differences of policy priorities complicate the ability to create a combined approach based on consensus.
- Institutional factors: typically SWAps in the agricultural sector are managed by Ministries of Agriculture. However, in most countries, the ministries fail to mobilise other actors relevant to the agricultural sector and hence to a sector-wide approach. There is also a tendency for ministries of agriculture to adopt an interventionist approach to policy and resist influence from outside the ministry.
- Operational factors: processes and systems are implemented without reference to 'local realities'. This leads to a focus on systems development and institutional capacity-building and less on the actual services delivered.
