= Stop the City =

1983-4 UK demonstrations against the military-financial complex

Stop the City demonstrations of 1983 and 1984 were billed as a 'Carnival Against War, Oppression and Destruction', in other words protests against the military-financial complex. These demonstrations can be seen as the forerunner of the anti-globalisation protests of the 1990s, especially those in London, England, on May Day and the Carnival against Capitalism on 18 June 1999. They were partially inspired by the actions of the Greenham Common Women's Peace Camp.

Activities that formed part of the biggest of these events were separate day-long street blockades of the financial district (the City of London) which supporters of the protest argued are a major centre for profiteering, and consequently a root cause of many of the world's problems. The largest blockade involved 3,000 people, which succeeded in causing a £100 million shortfall on the day according to The Times. Around 1,000 arrests were subsequently made by the police over 18 months.

== Inspirations ==
There were several inspirations for the protest. At the time there was a growing anti-militarist and anti-nuclear movement across Europe represented in the UK by CND and the Greenham Common Women's Peace Camp, which repeatedly blockaded the RAF Greenham Common base in protest at nuclear weapons being placed there. A new generation of anarchists were being drawn into activism through anarcho-punk.

== 1983 demonstration in London ==
On 29 September 1983, 1500 people demonstrated in order to disrupt the financial activities of the City of London. Buildings were blockaded and leaflets handed out.

The protest was unusual for the time since it had not met with the police to discuss a route or stewarding, it was not organised by a political party or trade union and the plan was not to march from one point to another.

Afterwards, Penny Rimbaud of Crass declared it “a massive success, the best gig of the year." Rimbaud listed the following actions: work stopped at the Royal Exchange, shops selling fur attacked, restaurants stink-bombed, building locks glued, telephone lines jammed.

Around 200 arrestees faced charges, with the court dates set for November 1983. Solidarity days were organised with the theme 'Actions against Banks.'

== 1984 demonstrations in London ==
The second demonstration was planned by anarchists meeting at the Ambulance Station squat on Old Kent Road in south London. The squat also organised a benefit gig which raised £300 and featured Flux of Pink Indians, Kukl and Flowers in the Dustbin. The rough plan for the day was as follows:

- 08:00 Start
- 10:00 Roadblock of Threadneedle Street
- 11:00, 13:00, 14:00 Noise protests
- 12:00 A “die-in” lasting two minutes.
- 16:00 Demonstration at the Royal Exchange
- 18:00 Support for any arrestees at Guildhall court

The demonstration happened on 29 March 1984. In addition to the events stated above there were feminist actions such as the mass theft of tampons from Boots the chemists, animal rights protests against fur and alternative energy protests outside the Central Electricity Generating Board. In total, 550 police officers were deployed and there were around 400 arrests. Writing in The Times a correspondent described "a combination of punks, anarchists, nuclear disarmers, and people demanding the liberation of gays, women or animals."

At an evaluation conference attended by around 65 people on 14–15 April it was decided to do another Stop the City in September 1984 and also to do a short-notice event in May. The 31 May Stop the City was swamped by police and viewed by organisers as a failure. It was acknowledged that more publicity was needed.

The fourth Stop the City took place on 27 September 1984, with benefit gigs happening at the Dickie Dirts squat in Coldharbour Lane in Brixton, south London. St. Paul's Cathedral and the Royal Exchange were sealed off against demonstrators. A 'people's party' was held in a bank and banners were hung up. A counter group handed out leaflets urging city workers to 'aggravate an anarchist.' The water in the Trafalgar Square fountains was dyed red and there was an impromptu anti-apartheid demonstration on Oxford Street. The police tactic was again to swamp the protests. Of the 470 arrests, most were released again swiftly.

Penny Rimbaud wrote that "Aware that we had been out-manoeuvred, no further Stop the City actions took place in London."

== 1984 demonstrations around UK ==
Before the second Stop the City in London in 1984, there were also smaller demonstrations attacking banks in Bristol and Glasgow one week earlier.

Following the fourth Stop the City event in London, there were other demonstrations across the UK, including Birmingham. In Leeds, on 9 August 1984, activists including members of Chumbawamba chained up the doors of a porn cinema, threw Monopoly money onto shoppers, gave out leaflets and ran a pirate radio station which blocked wavelengths used by BBC radio stations.

== Reflections ==
Stop the City was criticised by the Anarchist Workers Group for creating an anarchist ghetto politics.

Whilst seen as initially successful, the demonstrations also provoked questions for anarcho-punk activists about how to make alliances with other groups and what aims to strive for in future. It was clear that the numbers of people on Stop the City protests were nothing like the 400,000 people attending the CND rally at Hyde Park in 1983.

An hour-long documentary was made about the second Stop the City event by members of Crass Mick Duffield (camera), Joy de Vivre (sound) and Andy Palmer (interviewer).

== See also ==
- Green Anarchist
- Class War
- London Greenpeace
