= National Federation of Domestic Workers of Bolivia =

The National Federation of Domestic Workers of Bolivia (Spanish: Federación Nacional de Trabajadoras del Hogar de Bolivia; FENATRAHOB) is a Bolivian trade union of domestic workers across the country.

== History ==
The National Federation of Domestic Workers of Bolivia was founded on March 28, 1993, with the goal of defending the rights of domestic workers. Its creation came during the First National Domestic Workers' Congress in Cochabamba.

Its founding governing board included: Basilia Catari Torres, executive secretary; Casimira Rodríguez Romero, secretary of external affairs; Amelia Ticona, recording secretary; Leonarda Alcon, finance secretary; Cristina Yuca, press secretary; Aurora Flores, organizational secretary; and Jesusa Barrio, spokesperson.

FENATRAHOB brought together various existing organizations in different Bolivian departments. Its predecessors in earlier decades included the Cooks' Union and the Women Workers' Federation.

The organization is part of the Latin American and Caribbean Confederation of Domestic Workers (CONLACTRAHO).

As of 2023, it had 117,000 members.

== Activities ==
FENATRAHOB has been actively engaged in policymaking efforts, including through the appointment of activists to official positions. It was involved in proposing Law No. 2450, regulating paid domestic work, which was enacted in 2003.

That law established the right to health insurance for domestic workers, but did not detail how such access would be implemented, leaving it in limbo. This has led FENATRAHOB to continue advocating around this issue.

The organization also monitors claims of wage theft, labor abuse, and discrimination.

In 2006, it helped establish March 30 as National Domestic Workers Day.
