= Activist knowledge =

Psychological term referring to ideological aspects of social movements

Activist knowledge or dissident knowledge refers to the ideological and ideational aspects of social movements such as challenging or reformulating dominant political ideas and ideologies, and developing new concepts, thoughts and meanings through the interactions with social, political, cultural and economic authorities.

The cognitive or ideational aspects of social movements have been theorized by a group of scholars such as Ron Eyerman and Andrew Jamison (from a cognitive approach), Hank Johnston and David Snow and others (from a framing perspective) and S A Hosseini, from an integrative approach.

"The ‘ideational dimension’ of a social movement consists of the intellectual processes of how the movement actors understand, conceptualize, explain, and analyze social problems and the events they have experienced, and how they reflect on their own individual and collective practices. The ‘ideational landscape’ of a social movement is a space where movement actors translate their collective experiences of social reality into ideas. Activist knowledge is, by definition, a process of (trans)forming social consciousness through a certain course of socio-political contentions and communicative actions – mostly undertaken in ‘public spheres’, around a vital set of interrelated social issues, in order to explain and respond to them. This kind of collective-networked cognition is a practical-ideational process which proceeds out of a social movement’s relations with (and contributions to) both existing knowledge spheres and social reality. Activist knowledge is also refers to all kind of experience knowledge originating from activist such as community, groups, and associations "

The creation of new systems of meaning is an inseparable part of social movements. Especially in today's information society, as Manuel Castells said, "the real targets of the current mobilizations are the minds of people around the world." it is "by changing minds that they expect to put pressure on the institutions of governance and, ultimately, bring democracy and alternative social values to these institutions" Social movement actors play an important role in transforming social knowledge at manylevels. Many activists are deeply engaged in formulating tensions, articulating themes, andcontributing to the present vocabulary of social thoughts. They redene what is real andwhat is possible. They often develop provocative ideas to cause or resist social changes.Even at the practical level, by responding to social problems and formulating those problemsfor society, social movements create spaces for new intellectual activities and spur publicdiscussions.

As mentioned in the World Social Forum’s Charter of Principles, for instance, the World Social Forum is a movement of ideas that prompts reflection, and the transparent circulation of the results of that reflection, on the mechanisms and instruments of domination by capital, and on the alternatives proposed to solve the problems of exclusion and inequality(WSF 2001 Principle 11)

The meaning and knowledge making processes in social movements are not however restricted to information acquisition and processing, social psychological cognitions, practical knowledge, deliberative contemplations in public spheres, discursive and ideological transformations, framing and so on.

Activist knowledge is formed through both strategic, and communicative in confronting dominant social processes. Such knowledge is shaped at a very pragmatic level that differs in nature (despite some overlaps) from the academic level of knowledge production, the institutional level of political ideology construction, and even the routine interactional level of cultural reproduction".
