= Globalization and Health =

- Discipline: Global health
- Language: English
- Edited by: Greg Martin, Ronald Labonté, Katerini Storeng

Publication details
- History: 2005-present
- Publisher: BioMed Central
- Open access: Yes
- Impact factor: 10.8 (2022)

Standard abbreviations
- ISO 4: Glob. Health

Indexing
- ISSN: 1744-8603
- LCCN: 2005243560
- OCLC no.: 59553481

Links
- Journal homepage; Online archive

Globalization and Health is a peer-reviewed open-access public health journal from BioMed Central that covers the topic of globalization and its effects on health. Globalization and Health was the first open access global health journal available when it came out in 2005. By 2022, the editors in chief were Ronald Labonté, Greg Martin, and Katerini Storeng.

Globalization and Health was one of six out of 100 journals to receive the highest possible "Five Wheel" impact rating from the SDG Impact Intensity™ journal rating system, based on an analysis of data from 2016-2020 that assessed relevance to the Sustainable Development Goals (SDGs). It has been positively rated in research on inclusivity in academic publication.

== History ==
Globalization and Health was the first open access global health journal available when it appeared in April 2005. It was first announced under the leadership of Greg Martin (then at the London School of Hygiene and Tropical Medicine) and Derek Yach (Yale University).

From 2008 to 2013, Martin was joined as co-editor-in-chief by Emma Pitchforth of the London School of Economics (LSE Health). Beginning in 2013, Martin was joined by guest editors for a thematic series of issues focusing on global health systems and lessons from low and middle-income countries.

In 2018, Ronald Labonté joined Martin as a co-editor-in-chief. By 2022, the editors in chief were Greg Martin (Ireland), Ronald Labonté (Canada), and Katerini Storeng (Norway).

== Focus ==
Globalization and Health offers an international platform for original research, knowledge sharing, and debate on the topic of globalization and its effects on health, with special attention to the ways in which globalization processes affect research and policy. Globalization affects individual and population health in multiple ways, requiring societies to adapt. Processes of global change shape determinants of health including lifestyle, employment, housing, education, and sanitation. Globalization is restructuring human societies, leading to new patterns of health and disease. Globalization is affecting financing, regulation and marketing of healthcare and services.

Through its publication history, several assessments have been made of its content and how it has changed over time. Between 2005 and 2010, the journal's strongest focus was on bio-medical and population health, but social science perspectives were increasingly addressed, and the number of empirical studies was increasing. By 2011, over 50 % of its publications were research articles. The journal also included high percentages of literature reviews and meta-analyses.

Globalization and Health publishes articles under the following sections: Development, Disease, Economics and trade, Environment, Governance for health, Health in foreign policy, Health systems, Migration and mobilities, Psychosocial impacts, and Theory, models and methods.

== Abstracting and indexing ==
The journal is abstracted and indexed in PubMed Central, CABI, EMBASE, and Scopus.
