= Woman's Medical Journal =

American journal founded in 1893

- Discipline: General medicine
- Language: English

Publication details
- History: 1893–1919

Standard abbreviations
- ISO 4: Woman's Med. J.

Indexing
- ISSN: 0096-6819
- OCLC no.: 1438709527

The Woman's Medical Journal, published 1893–1952, was the first women's medical journal and became the organ of the Medical Women's National Association upon the latter's founding in 1915 (later known as the American Medical Women's Association). It was a monthly journal devoted to the interests of women physicians, founded by Elmina M. Roys Gavitt at a time when, in the USA, the practice of medicine by women was essentially a separate practice from that by men. Editors included co-founder Margaret Hackedorn Rockhill, Eliza Maria Mosher, Grace Peckham Murray, Isabelle Thompson Smart, Bertha Van Hoosen, and Marion Craig Potter, the first vice president of the Medical Women's National Association. It is abstracted and indexed in OLDMEDLINE and Scopus.
