= AWHS =

AWHS may refer to:

- American Women's Hospitals Service
- Archbishop Williams High School
- Arvada West High School
