= Fletcher, Vermont =

- Town
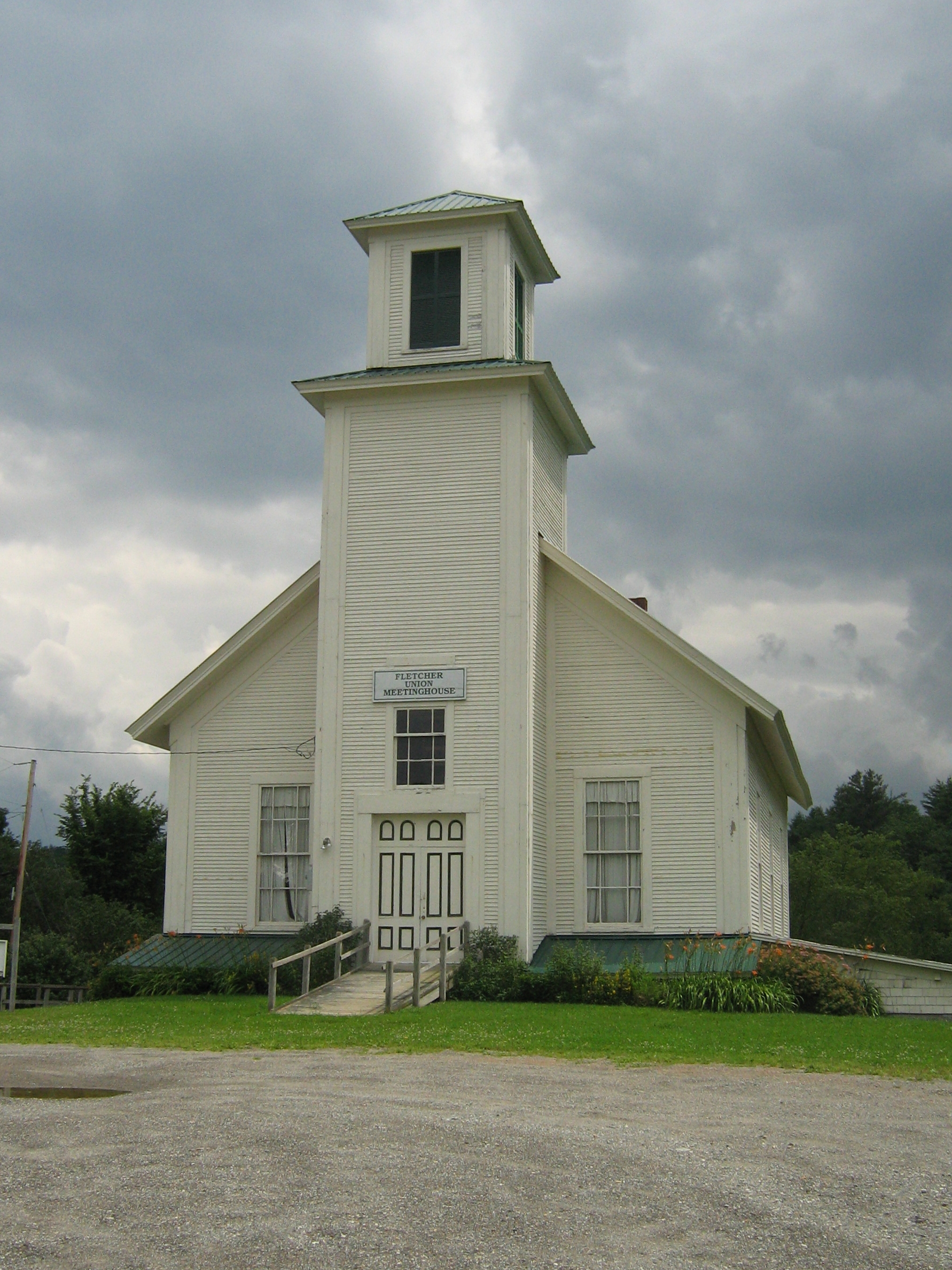
- Meeting house

- Wordmark

- Location in Franklin County and the state of Vermont
- Coordinates: 44°44′12″N 72°58′45″W
- Country: United States
- State: Vermont
- County: Franklin
- Communities: Fletcher; Binghamville; East Fletcher; West Fletcher

Area
  - Total: 38.0 sq mi (98.4 km^{2})
  - Land: 37.7 sq mi (97.7 km^{2})
  - Water: 0.27 sq mi (0.7 km^{2})
- Elevation: 922 ft (281 m)

Population (2020)
  - Total: 1,346
  - Density: 36/sq mi (13.8/km^{2})
- Time zone: UTC−5 (Eastern (EST))
  - Summer (DST): UTC−4 (EDT)
- ZIP Codes: 05444 (Cambridge); 05448 (East Fairfield); 05464 (Jeffersonville); 05454 (Fairfax)
- Area code: 802
- FIPS code: 50-26500
- GNIS feature ID: 1462099
- Website: www.fletchervt.net

Fletcher is a town in Franklin County, Vermont, United States. The population was 1,346 at the 2020 census.

== Geography ==
Fletcher is located in southern Franklin County, bordered to the southeast by Lamoille County. According to the United States Census Bureau, the town has a total area of 38.0 square miles (98.4 km^{2}), of which 37.7 square miles (97.7 km^{2}) is land and 0.3 square miles (0.7 km^{2}), or 0.71%, is water. The Lamoille River forms the short southern boundary of the town. Metcalf Pond is located in the north-central part of town. Fletcher Mountain, with a summit elevation of 2,150 feet (660 m), is located at the eastern end of town.

The town contains the settlements of Fletcher, West Fletcher, East Fletcher, and Binghamville. The Binghamville United Methodist Church and Fletcher General Store are located in Binghamville. Vermont Route 108 passes through East Fletcher, leading north to Enosburg Falls and south to Jeffersonville. The Fletcher Union Church, also known as the Fletcher Community House, is a historic former church building on Town Highway 1 (Cambridge Road). Built in 1871, it is one of only a few public buildings in the community, and has for over a century been a secular community meeting space. It was listed on the National Register of Historic Places in 1982.

== Demographics ==
Historical population
Census	Pop.	Note	%±
1790	47		—
1800	200		325.5%
1810	382		91.0%
1820	497		30.1%
1830	793		59.6%
1840	1,014		27.9%
1850	1,084		6.9%
1860	916		−15.5%
1870	865		−5.6%
1880	868		0.3%
1890	793		−8.6%
1900	750		−5.4%
1910	737		−1.7%
1920	656		−11.0%
1930	667		1.7%
1940	549		−17.7%
1950	485		−11.7%
1960	399		−17.7%
1970	456		14.3%
1980	626		37.3%
1990	941		50.3%
2000	1,179		25.3%
2010	1,277		8.3%
2020	1,346		5.4%
U.S. Decennial Census

As of the census of 2000, there were 1,179 people, 428 households, and 324 families residing in the town. The population density was 31.2 people per square mile (12.0/km^{2}). There were 510 housing units at an average density of 13.5 per square mile (5.2/km^{2}). The racial makeup of the town was 96.78% White, 0.76% Native American, 0.34% Asian, 0.34% from other races, and 1.78% from two or more races. Hispanic or Latino of any race were 0.34% of the population.

There were 428 households, out of which 42.5% had children under the age of 18 living with them, 66.4% were married couples living together, 4.9% had a female householder with no husband present, and 24.1% were non-families. 18.5% Of all households, 18.5% were made up of individuals, and 4.7% had someone living alone who was 65 years of age or older. The average household size was 2.75 and the average family size was 3.12.

In the town, the population was spread out, with 28.7% under the age of 18, 7.7% from 18 to 24, 33.2% from 25 to 44, 24.8% from 45 to 64, and 5.7% who were 65 years of age or older. The median age was 35 years. For every 100 females, there were 113.2 males. For every 100 females age 18 and over, there were 107.1 males.

The median income for a household in the town was $46,146, and the median income for a family was $49,375. Males had a median income of $34,583 versus $20,391 for females. The per capita income for the town was $20,498. About 4.0% of families and 6.3% of the population were below the poverty line, including 9.3% of those under age 18 and 11.6% of those age 65 or over.

== Education ==
The town is in the Franklin West Supervisory Union.

== Notable people ==
- W. H. H. Bingham, Vermont attorney and politician
- Anson Call, Mormon pioneer
- Elmina M. Roys Gavitt (1828–1898), physician; medical journal founder, editor-in-chief
- Donly C. Hawley, mayor of Burlington, Vermont
- Elias B. Holmes, Congressman from New York
- Milo White, Congressman from Minnesota
