= Rosalie Morton Park =

Park in Belgrade, Serbia

- Калемегдански парк
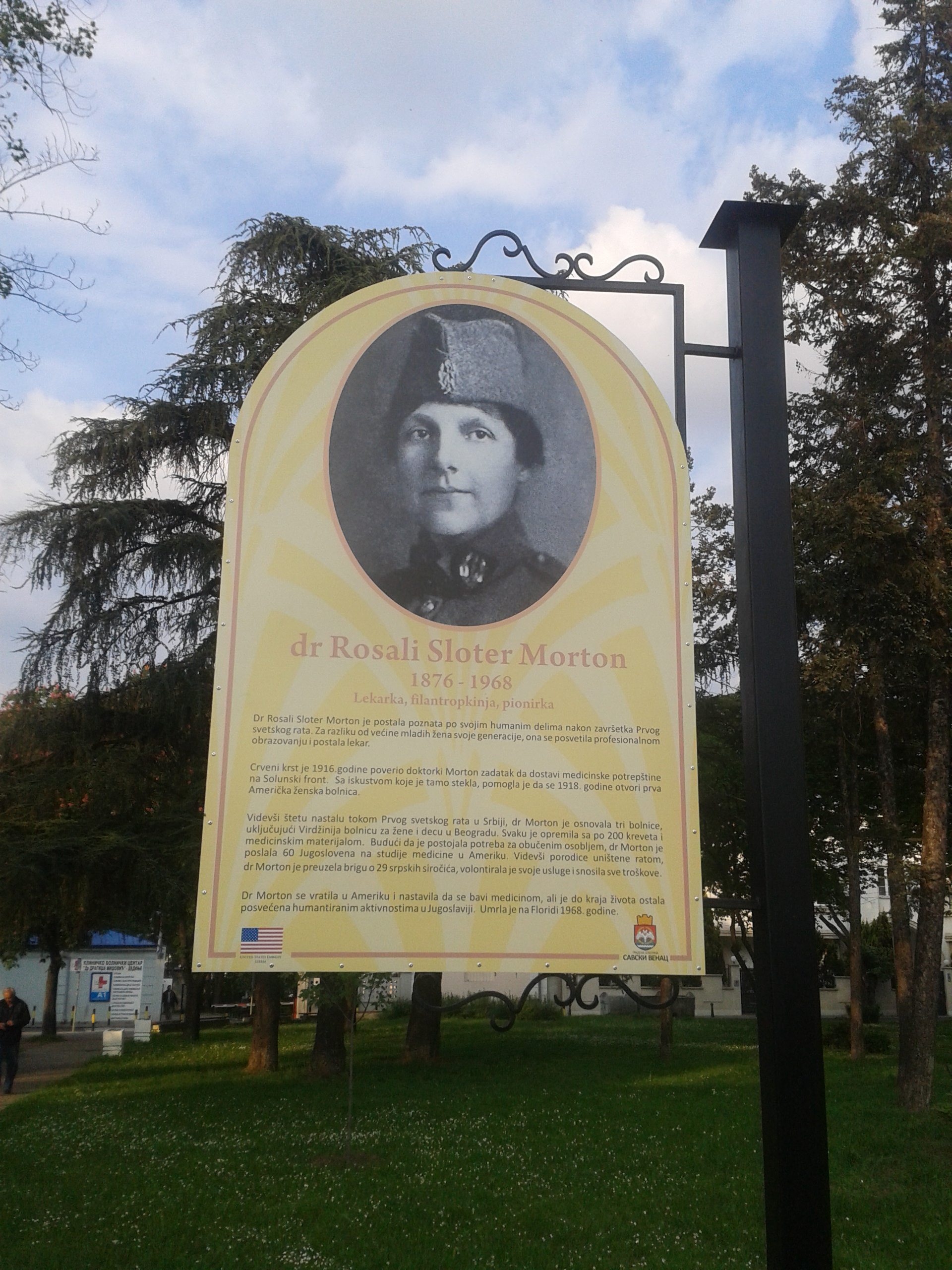
- Rosalie Morton Park

- Location within Belgrade
- Location: Savski Venac, Belgrade
- Coordinates: 44.7787°N 20.4588°E
- Open: All year

Park Rozali Morton (Serbian Cyrillic: Парк Розали Мортон) is a park in Belgrade, the capital of Serbia. It is located in the municipality of Savski Venac.

== Location ==
The park is located in the west-central section of the municipality, in the neighborhood of Dedinje. It is bounded by the streets of Heroja Milana Tepića, Ljutice Bogdana and Bulevar kneza Aleksandra Karađorđevića.

== History ==
The park was named after American doctor Rosalie Morton (1876–1968) in 2006. She was made a special commissioner of the Red Cross to take supplies to the Macedonian front in the World War I. After the war, she helped to establish three hospitals in Serbia, equipped them with 200 beds and medical supplies, sent 60 students to study medicine in the US and personally supported schooling of 29 Serbian war orphans. In 1919, she donated Ford's medical vehicle to the Belgrade's emergency medical service, the first motorized ambulance in the city.

The park is located in the vicinity of several hospitals, including University Hospital Center Dr Dragiša Mišović and it was officially opened on Earth Day, 22 April 2014, with the help from the Red Cross of Serbia and US Embassy in Serbia.

In 2016 the park was renovated and rearranged. Concrete paths were replaced with granite ones, and in the center of the park, where the paths are connecting, a small plateau with benches was created.

== Characteristics ==
The park has a shape of an irregular triangle and covers an area of 0.3 hectares (32,000 sq ft). A memorial information table for Dr Rosalie Morton is placed in the park.

Some of the plants in the park include liriodendron trees and cherry laurel shrubs.

== Gallery ==
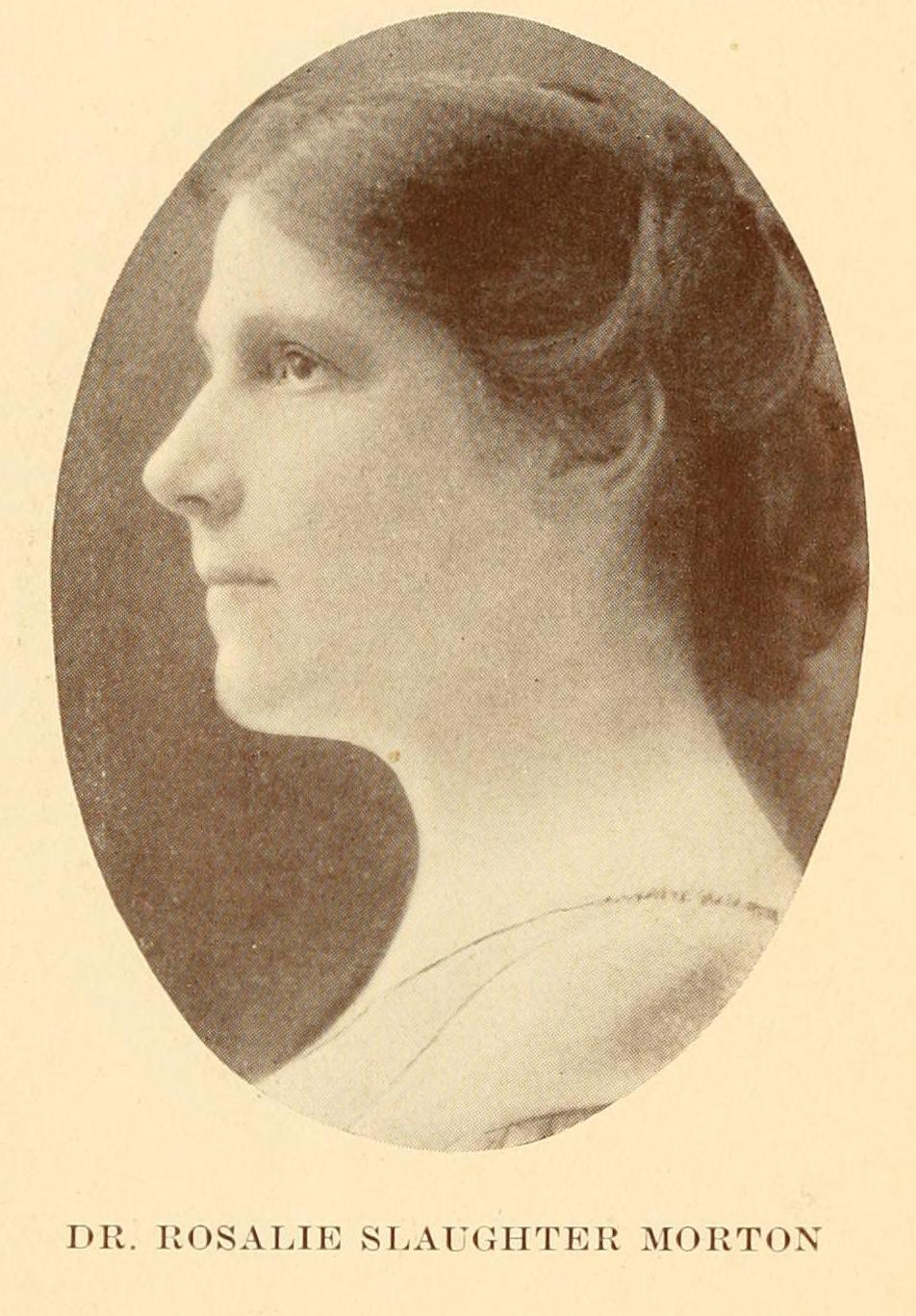
Dr Rosalie Morton

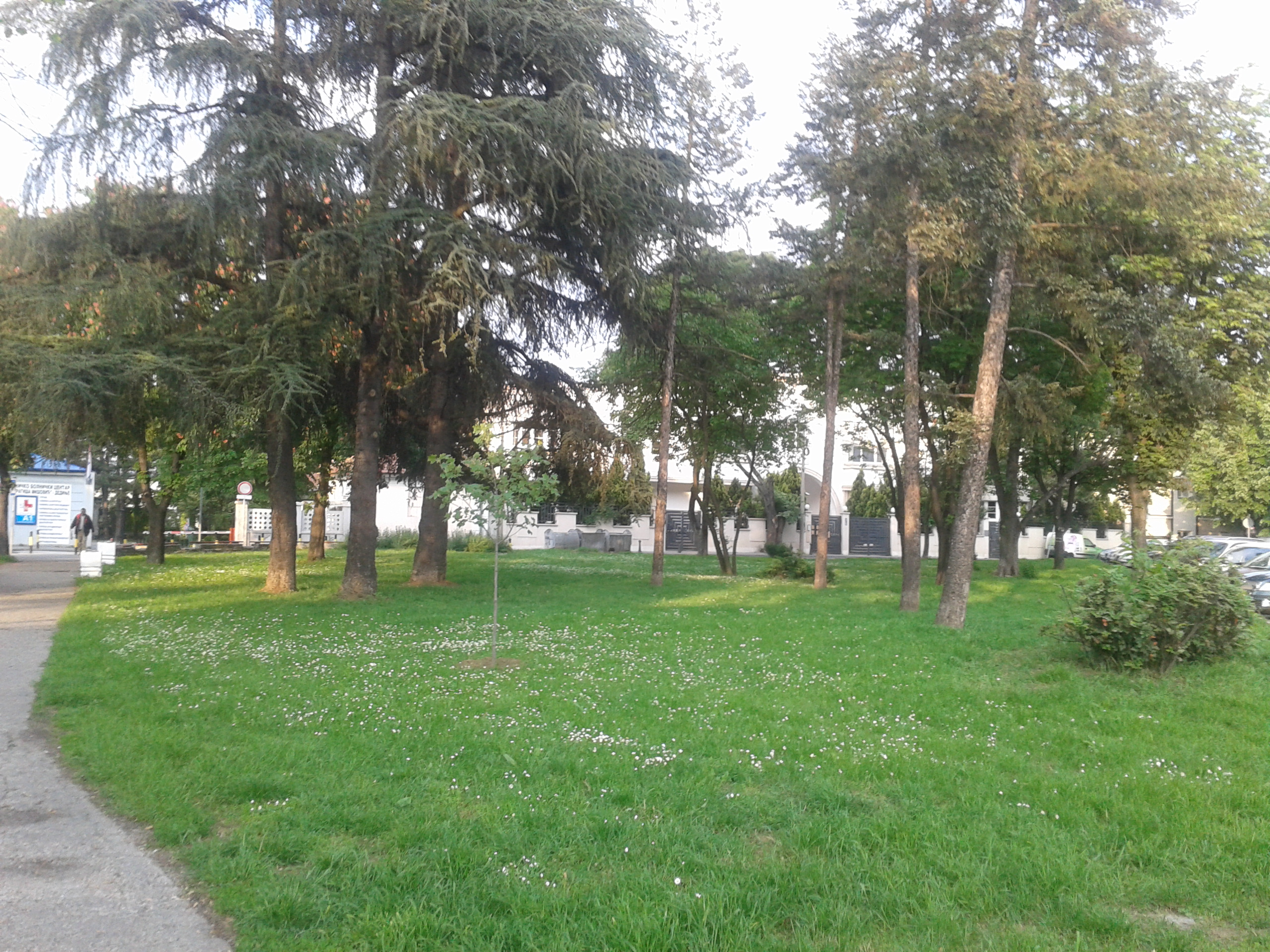
View on Rosalie Morton Park

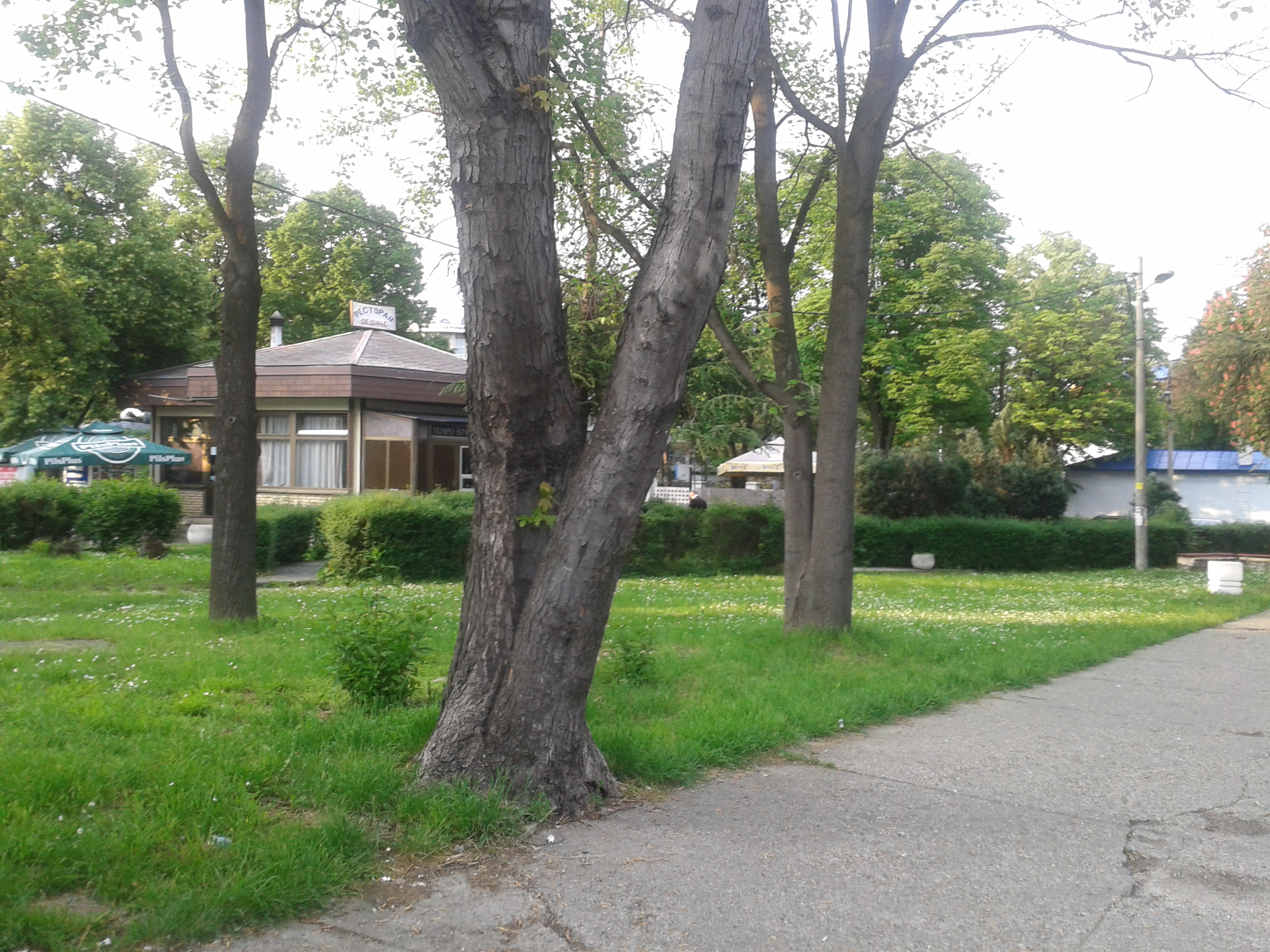
Rosalie Morton Park

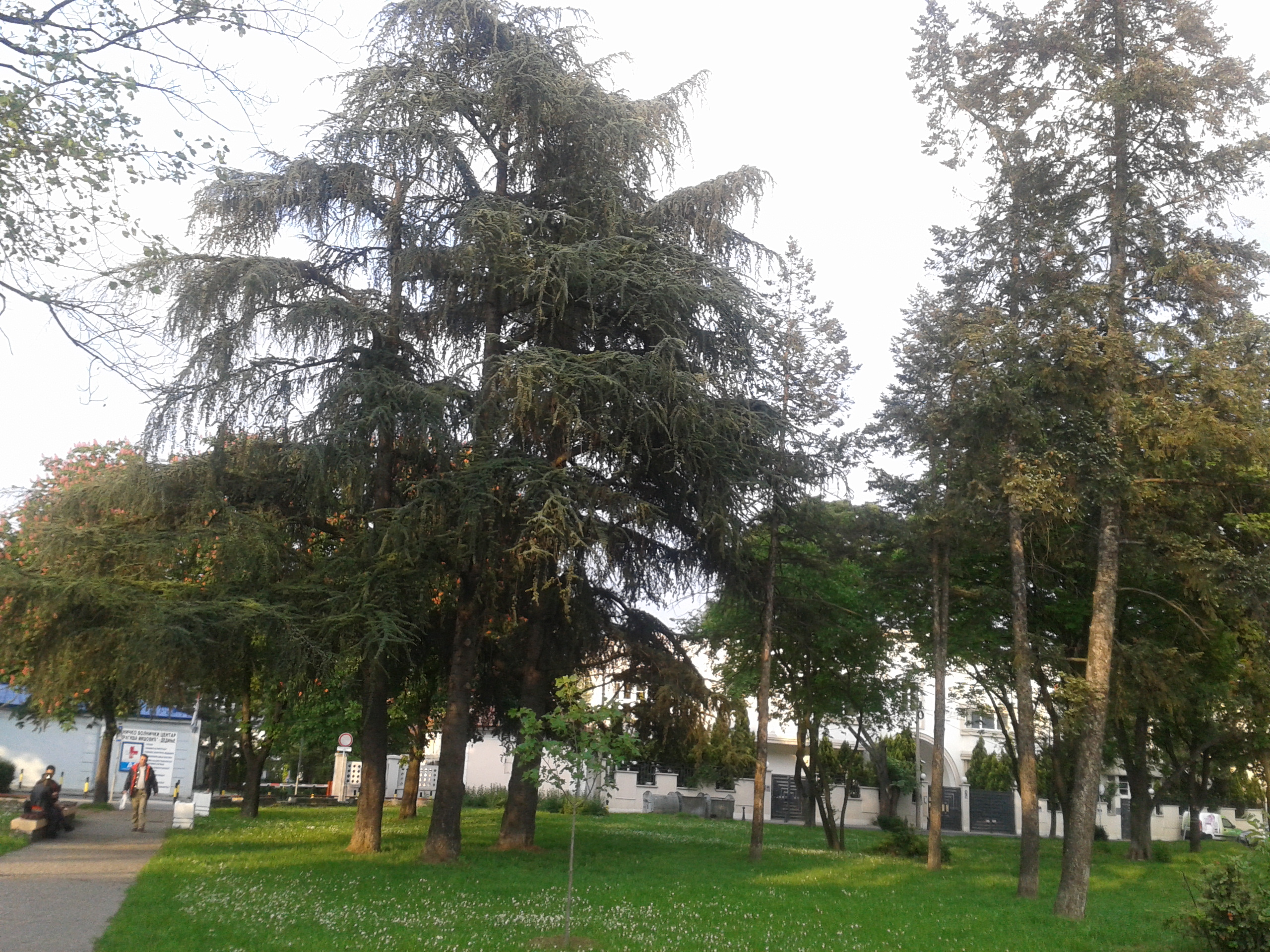
Rosalie Morton Park
