= Rosalie Slaughter Morton =

American physician (1876–1968)

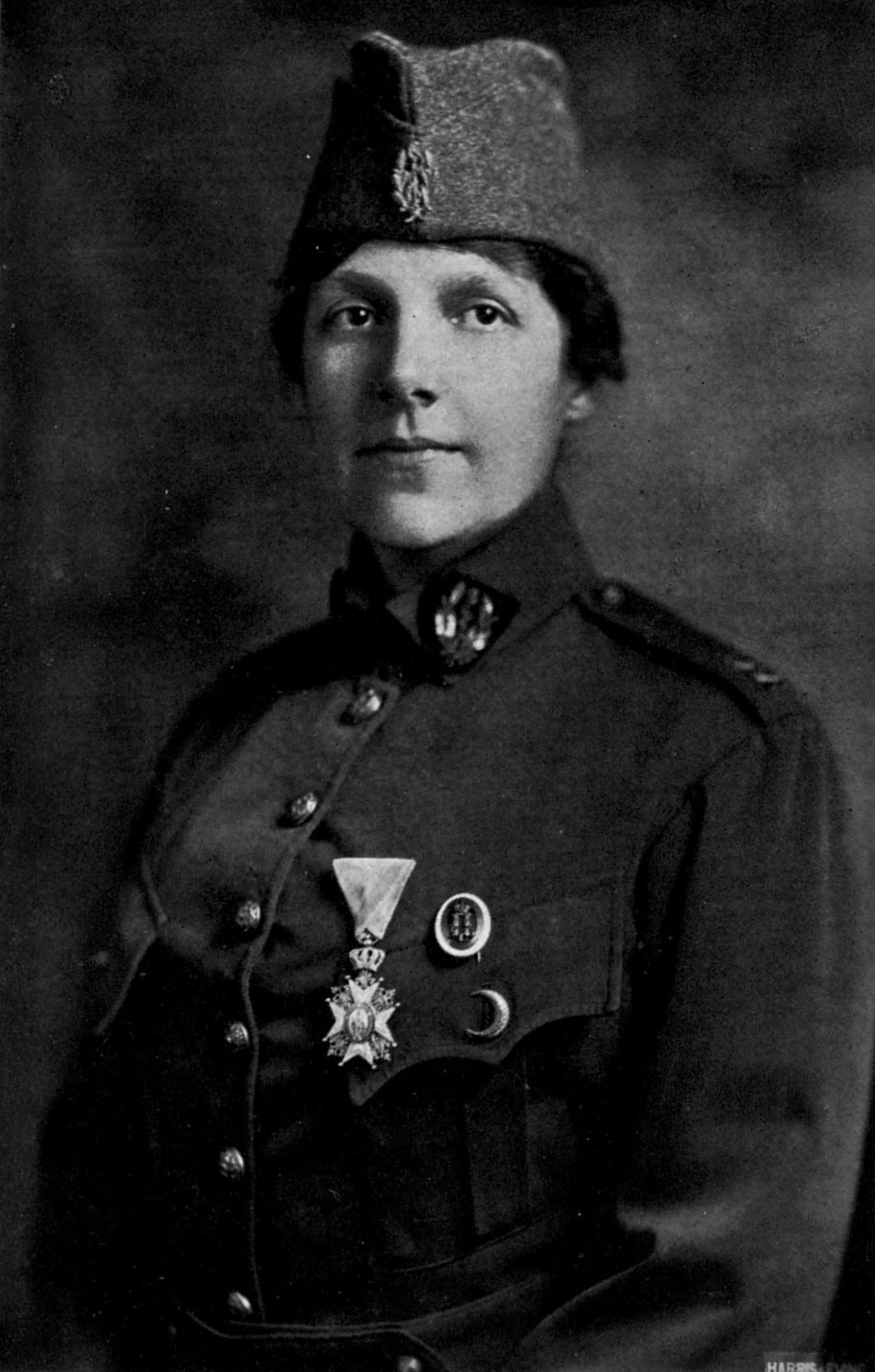
- Born: Blanche Rosalie Slaughter; October 16, 1872; Lynchburg, Virginia, US
- Died: May 5, 1968 (aged 91); Winter Park, Florida, US
- Resting place: Spring Hill Cemetery, Lynchburg, Virginia
- Education: Woman's Medical College of Pennsylvania
- Occupation: Physician
- Known for: Co-founder of the American Women's Hospitals Service and chairperson of the Public Health Education Committee
- Spouse: George B. Morton Jr. (m. 1905; died 1912)
- Awards: Cross of Czar Nicholas II; Joan of Arc medal Conspicuous Service Cross

Rosalie Slaughter Morton (born Blanche Rosalie Slaughter; October 16, 1872 – May 5, 1968) was an American physician, surgeon, and author. In addition to running her own medical practices, she became the first woman appointed as Attending Surgeon at the College of Physicians and Surgeons at Columbia University in 1916, and became the first chairperson of the American Women's Hospitals Service the following year. Morton served as a medic during the First World War, and was the first chair of the Public Health Education Committee. She was also one of the first women to join the faculty, and to later become a professor, at the Polyclinic Hospital of New York.

Born in Lynchburg, Virginia, Morton studied at the Woman's Medical College of Pennsylvania despite her family's expectation that she would aim to find a husband who could provide for her. She went on to conduct further study and research across Europe and Asia before returning to the United States to open her own medical practices.

In 1937 Morton published an autobiography – A Woman Surgeon: The Life and Work of Rosalie Slaughter Morton, and released a second book titled A Doctor's Holiday in Iran in 1940, both to positive reviews. She received a number of awards during her career, including the Conspicuous Service Cross. Rosalie Morton Park in Belgrade is named in her honor.

== Personal life ==
=== Early life and education ===
Blanche Rosalie Slaughter was born in 1872 in Lynchburg, Virginia to Mary Harker and John Flavel Slaughter, in a family with a strong tradition of careers in surgery. She had five brothers and one sister (three other siblings died in childhood), and was educated in Lynchburg before travelling to a finishing school in Baltimore. As a child, she occasionally assisted her two older brothers, who were doctors, on their house visits or by sterilizing their medical instruments, and also attended to pets in her neighborhood. Following the death of her father, who had strongly opposed her desire to become a doctor, she enrolled at the Woman's Medical College of Pennsylvania in 1893, using money saved from her childhood allowance.

In her autobiography, Slaughter remarked that her upbringing and education had "been designed... to make me a capable wife—not to imbue me with a desire for a career," noting that her father had left her no money. He had expected her to find a husband who could provide for her, and many others in her family did not want her to pursue a career in medicine.

Slaughter graduated from college in Pennsylvania in 1897 with two of the three honors available to her, along with prizes for the best invention of surgical equipment and the best clinical case report. She subsequently interned at the Philadelphia City Hospital and was appointed as resident physician at the Alumnae Hospital and Dispensary, where she worked until 1899. She then began further studies in Europe for three years, traveling to locations including Berlin, Vienna, Paris, and London.

During this time, Slaughter took courses, observed surgeries, and wrote a number of scientific papers including several comparing the health of women and men. Following the advice of Victor Horsley, her instructor in London, she also traveled to the British Government Laboratory in Mumbai for six months to work on prophylactics against the bubonic plague. She subsequently spent a period of time in Ceylon (now Sri Lanka) studying tropical diseases, and visited Manila, before returning home. Her thesis on the bubonic plague was published by the Johns Hopkins Medical Society and then republished and distributed to quarantine ports around the United States by the Surgeon General of the United States. She also presented her work at the Toronto 1909 International Congress of Women, at the behest of Prince A. Morrow.

=== Later life ===
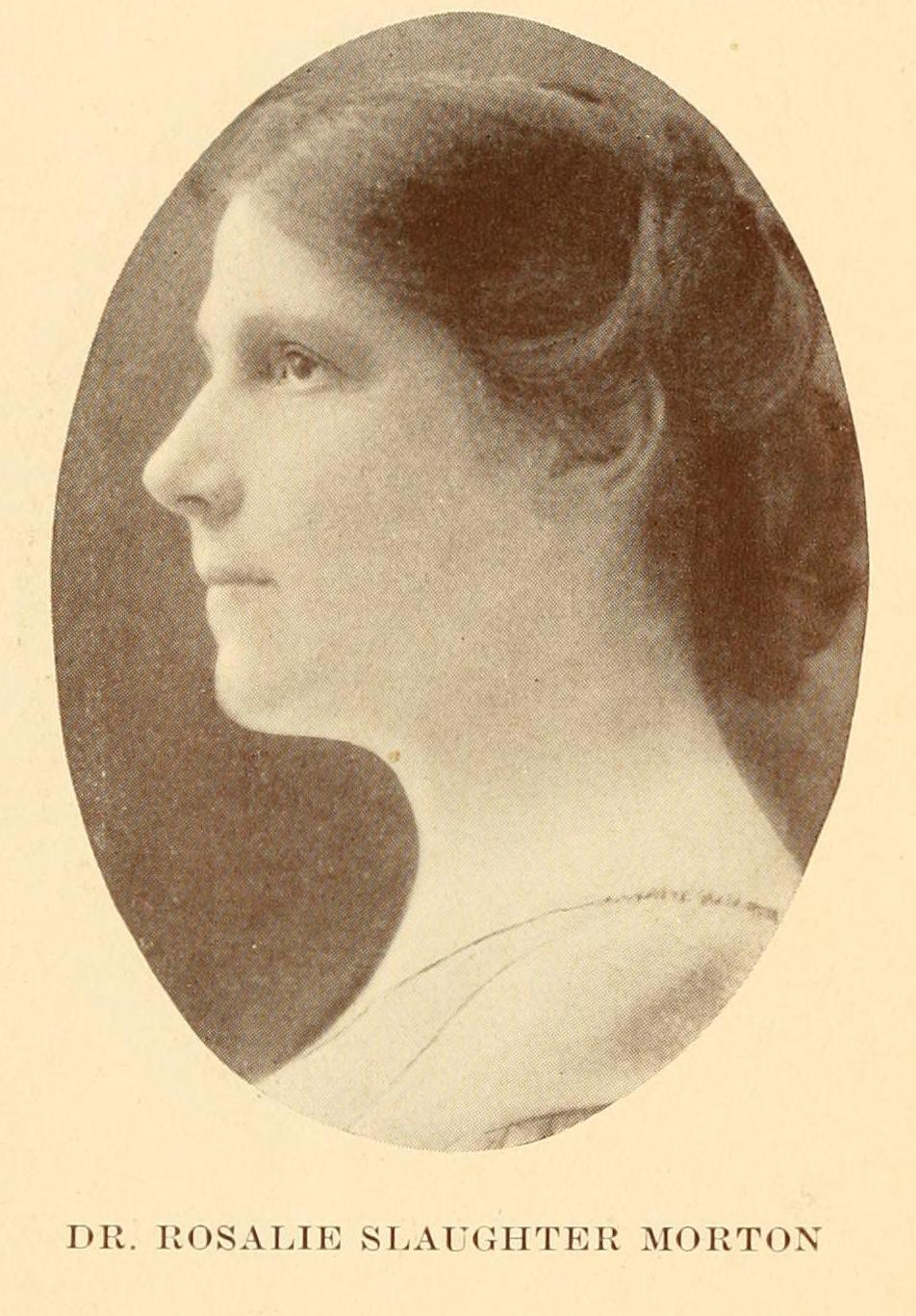
Portrait of Rosalie Slaughter Morton from Leaders of the Twentieth Century (1918) by Samuel and William Mendelson

In 1905, Slaughter married George Baxter Morton Jr., an attorney who had previously studied medicine, at St. Paul's Church, Lynchburg. The pair moved to New York, but in 1910, it was reported that they were living apart and she was filing for divorce. He died in 1912 of an aneurysm. After her husband's death, Morton was reportedly overcome with sadness; she later wrote "If my parents had been living, if we had had children, if there had been domestic duties, I would have found palliative comfort in them; but with [my husband's] going my domestic life was ... absolutely demolished". Morton never remarried after her husband's death.

Morton was a vocal supporter of women's suffrage, and was a member of the Equal Suffrage League of both New York city and New York state.

In the early 1930s Morton suffered a bout of pneumonia. She decided that she could no longer remain in New York due to the cold winters, and by happenstance received a letter inviting her to Winter Park, Florida to receive an honorary degree from Rollins College. She moved to the city shortly after visiting it.

In 1942, Morton commissioned a statue by a sculptor based in New York, which she donated to Spring Hill Cemetery in Lynchburg, dedicating it to the youth of the city. Morton died on May 5, 1968, while still living in Winter Park. She was cremated and her ashes were placed alongside her mother's grave at Spring Hill Cemetery.

== Career ==
=== 1902–1909: Post-graduation medical practices ===
After finishing her studies, Slaughter returned to the United States in 1902 and opened a medical practice specializing in gynecology in Washington D.C. Her practice was successful and well attended, in part as a result of her network of influential friends and family. In 1905 she attended the Pan-American Medical Congress and the American Public Health Association meeting after being selected as a delegate to both.

Following her marriage to George Morton Jr. in 1905 and move to New York, Morton passed the New York Board exams and opened a new medical practice there, where her husband was an attorney. Without the professional network she had in Washington D.C., she additionally took on work as an examiner of applicants for city employment and as part of the medical staff of the Teachers' Retirement System. Morton became active in medical societies in New York, both at the local and state level.

=== 1909–1914: Lecturing on public health ===
In 1909, at the urging of Morton, the American Medical Association created a Public Health Education Committee, with the aim of educating the public on subjects including health, hygiene, child care, and other medical topics. Morton was made the first chairperson of the committee, through which she organized public lectures by women physicians across the United States, remaining in the position for three years.

Between 1911 and 1912 Morton was the vice president of the American Medical Association, the first woman to hold the position. She was appointed as a clinical assistant and instructor at the Polyclinic Hospital of New York (where she was one of the first women faculty members) in 1912, and later became a professor of gynecology. During this time, she lectured on eugenics, hygiene, and physiology at a number of other universities, including New York University, Adelphi College, and Brooklyn's Pratt Institute, and spent one summer at the University of Vermont. Morton traveled to inspect and report on the conditions of hospitals and educational institutions, including a four-month trip around South America.

=== 1914 onwards: War efforts and women's hospitals ===
Inspired by the voluntary Scottish Women's Hospitals for Foreign Service and British Women's Hospital Corps, after the outbreak of the First World War, Morton traveled to Labrador, Canada to work in the Grenfell Mission hospitals at Battle Harbour and St. Anthony. The following year, she was made a special commissioner of the Red Cross and was charged with transporting supplies from Paris to the Macedonian front. While in Macedonia, Morton volunteered her time at the field hospitals, working through four epidemics. Following her return to New York, Morton became the first woman appointed as Attending Surgeon at the Vanderbilt Clinic of Columbia University's Physicians and Surgeons in 1916.

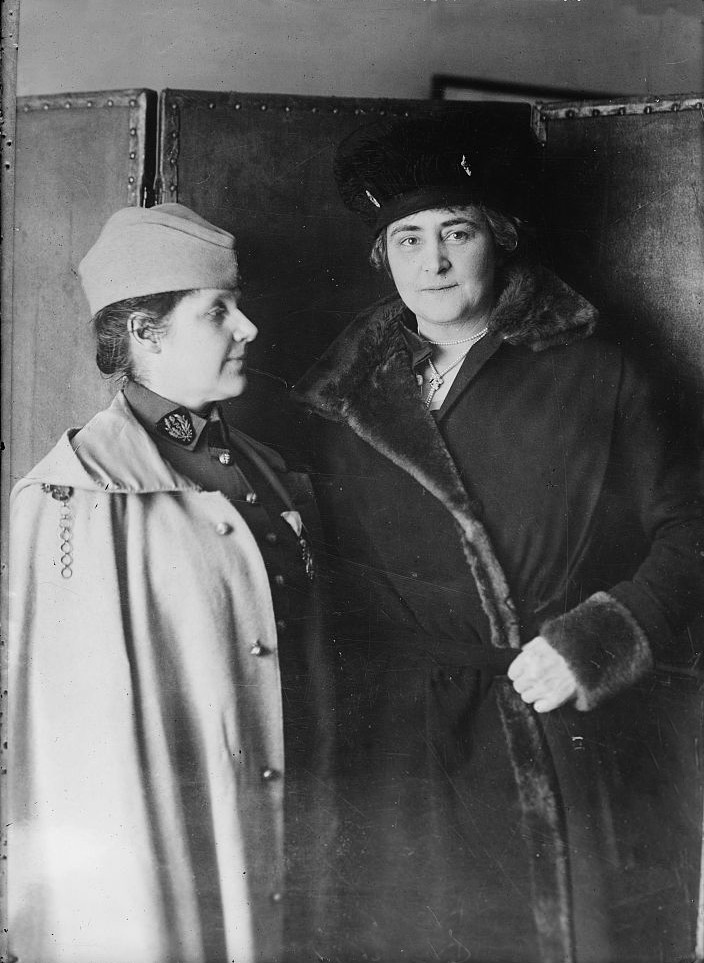
Morton (left) and Anne Morgan (right) in 1918

Morton had used her time in Macedonia learning about field hospitals, looking to replicate the success of the British and Scottish women's hospitals. Upon her return, she lectured and advocated for further support in Serbia. In response, the Medical Women's National Association (MWNA) voted to establish a War Service Committee, with the aim of creating new American hospitals in Europe. Morton became the committee's first chairperson in 1917 and led the service, restructured to become the American Women's Hospitals (AWH), alongside Mary M. Crawford. At the recommendation of William C. Gorgas, around this time Morton was additionally made chairman of the Committee on Women Physicians on the United States Council of National Defense, where she represented over 7000 women who were doctors.

After her request to send one thousand medical women who had volunteered for foreign service was opposed by the General Medical Board in Washington, Morton began attempting to raise funds to send them through the AWH. She initially struggled, raising only $11,000 by the end of 1917. She found herself strained between her work with AWH in New York and chairing the Committee on Women Physicians in Washington. Morton began separating the AWH from the MWNA, aligning it more with her personal aims than those of its parent organization as she tried to placate the Red Cross in order to receive official recognition for their hospitals. After the AWH hired a professional fundraiser, the organization was able to raise nearly $200,000 through a national fundraising drive. Morton led the AWH for one year, and was not re-elected in 1918, being officially succeeded by Esther Pohl Lovejoy the following year.

Morton continued running her New York practice while attempting to aid young people in Yugoslavia and Serbia who had been disrupted during the war into education. In March 1919, she established the International Serbian Education Committee, through which she helped dozens of young Serbians join American places of education. The scholarship was very popular, and received a large number of applicants. Ultimately, 61 students were placed in education across the United States and Cuba. The scheme was not without its challenges, as some students left their universities, or refused to return to Serbia.

After moving to Florida in the early 1930s, Morton established a small clinical practice where she conducted research into arthritis and endocrinology.

=== Awards ===
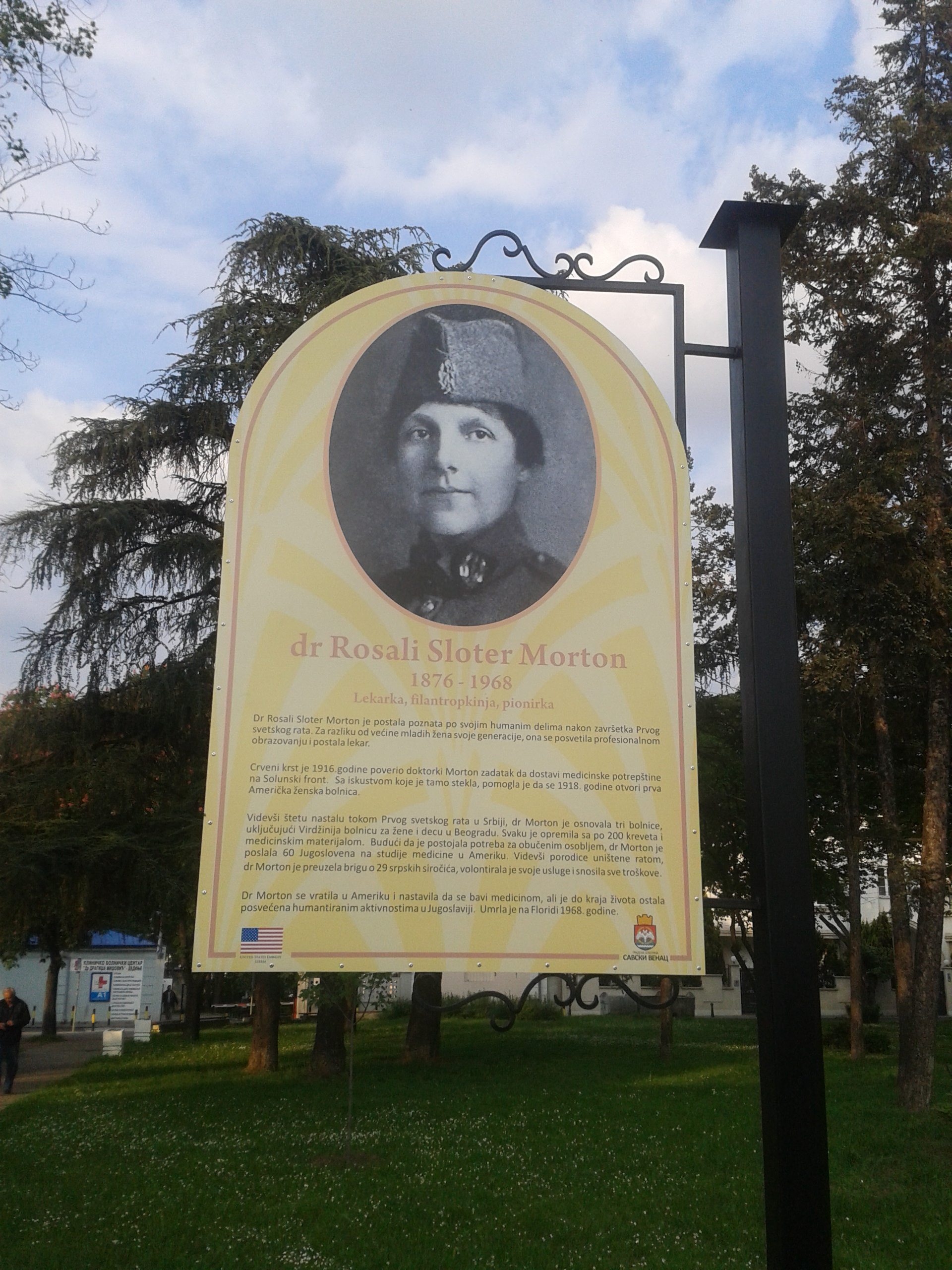
Rosalie Morton Park in Belgrade.

By 1937, Morton had been awarded 9 decorations by world governments, including those of the United States, France, and Serbia. During her career Morton's awards included the Cross of Czar Nicholas II, the Joan of Arc medal, and the Conspicuous Service Cross. In 1934, she was presented a special award by the American Medical Association for her work establishing the American Women's Hospitals. The American Cathedral in Paris presented her with the American and Serbian flags which had hung at the church during the war. Morton later presented the flags to women physicians in Belgrade.

A tree was planted in Central Park, New York in her honor, commemorating her "distinguished patriotic service", and both a street and park in Belgrade are named after her. A historical marker was placed at the location of Morton's childhood home in Lynchburg in 2019.

== Literary works ==
In 1897, Morton wrote a short story titled One Short Hour. It was published in a compilation titled Daughters of Aesculapius alongside other fiction and non-fiction works written by alumni and students at the Woman's Medical College of Pennsylvania. In her 13-page story, a woman is forced to choose between a career in medicine and marriage to her fiancé, ultimately choosing the former.

Over the course of her career, Morton published 23 scientific articles in medical journals and is credited with 11 inventions, including a surgical shoe and adjustable bed-lifting blocks.

Morton later wrote an autobiography titled A Woman Surgeon: The Life and Work of Rosalie Slaughter Morton, which was published in 1937 by Frederick A. Stokes. The book was reviewed well, with praise given to both the writing and the breadth of experiences chronicled within it. The Pittsburgh Press described Morton's autobiography as an "excellent book on a woman's accomplishments" commending both the descriptions of medical topics as well as political ones. A review in The Brooklyn Daily Eagle read "at no time is her book boring," calling it an important book for documenting the contributions of "a woman crusader." The Salt Lake Tribune described the book as "informative, thrilling and colorful", and The Sydney Morning Herald called it "particularly interesting." The Indiana Gazette rated the book as one of the best medical autobiographies of recent times.

After finishing her autobiography, Morton traveled to Iran, and in 1940 published a book on the country and her time there titled A Doctor's Holiday in Iran. Writing in the journal The Moslem World, S. M. Jordan described the book as "good reading" and a "worthy successor" to Morton's previous publication.
