= Elmina M. Roys Gavitt =

American physician; medical journal founder, editor-in-chief

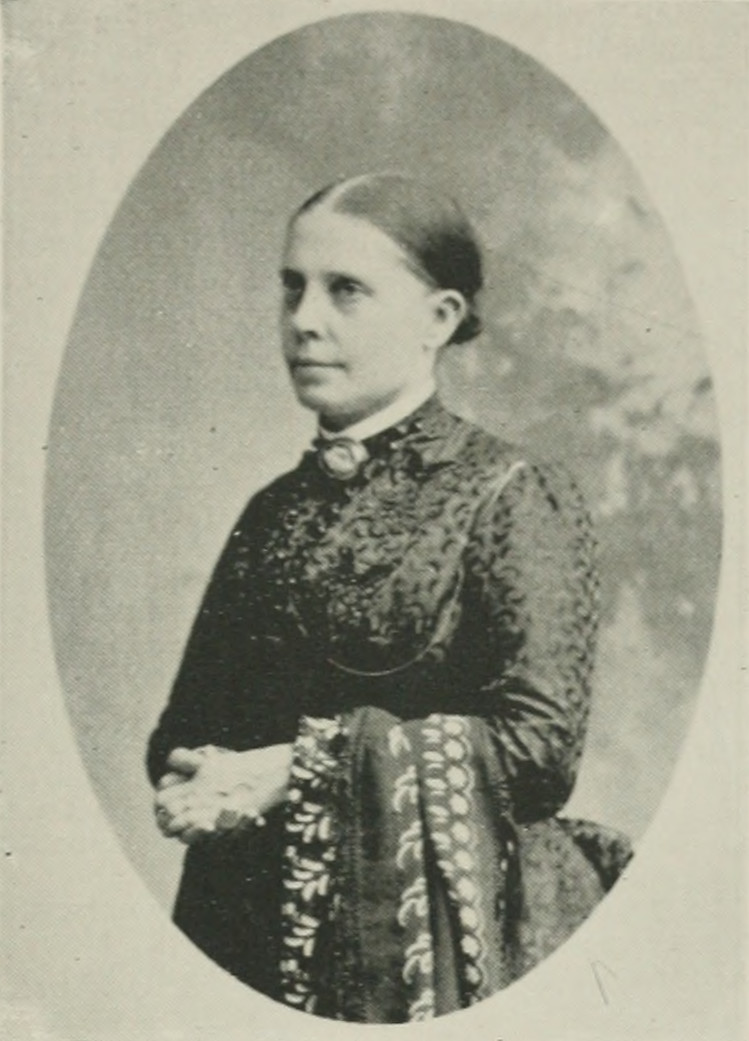
- Photo in A Woman of the Century
- Born: Elmina M. Roys; September 8, 1828; Fletcher, Vermont, U.S.
- Died: August 25, 1898 (aged 69)
- Education: Woman's Medical College of Philadelphia
- Occupations: physician; medial journal editor
- Spouse: Elnathan Corrington Gavitt (m. 1876; died 1896)

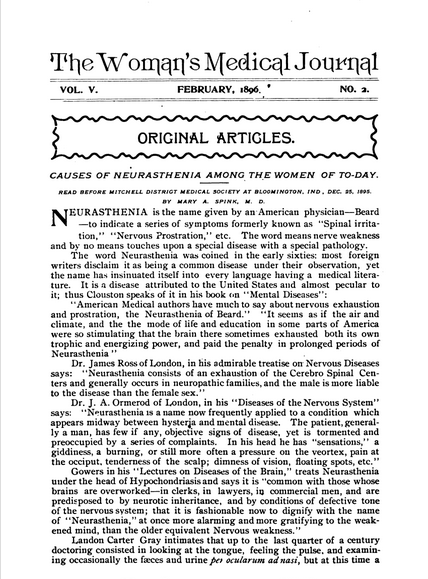
The Woman's Medical Journal (Feb 1896, Vol. V, No. 2)

Elmina M. Roys Gavitt (née, Roys; after marriage, Roys Gavitt or Roys-Gavitt; September 8, 1828 – August 25, 1898) was an American physician who was the founder and first editor of The Woman's Medical Journal, the first scientific monthly journal published to forward the interests exclusively of women physicians.

Gavitt was the first woman physician in Toledo, Ohio, arriving there to practice after graduation from medical school. She was characterized as having great vision and high ideals for women in medicine. It was because of the need for means of communication between the widely scattered women then practicing medicine that this publication, which was the first scientific monthly medical journal for medical women, was founded. Because of that need, Gavitt became its editor.

== Early life and education ==
Elmina M. Roys was born in Fletcher, Vermont (Note: According to Neely (1900), Gavitt was born in Boston.) on September 8, 1828. She was the second of eight children. She came of Puritan, New England ancestry. Her parents were to a great extent the instructors of their family, both in religious and secular matters, for there were public schools but half of the year, and church privileges were few and far between.

When Gavitt was fourteen years old, business interests led the family to move to Woonsocket, Rhode Island. For the next twelve years, Gavitt dealt with ill-health.

Hoping to benefit herself by striving for what seemed then almost unattainable, and seeing no opportunities available to American women which promised more usefulness than the profession of medicine, she entered the Woman's Medical College of Philadelphia, in 1862.

== Career ==
In 1865, Gavitt was called to Clifton Springs, New York, as house physician in an institution there. Two years later, she went to Rochester, Minnesota, and opened a successful general practice. In 1869, she moved to Toledo, Ohio. During that year, she adopted a blind sister's six children, ranging from two days to twelve years old.

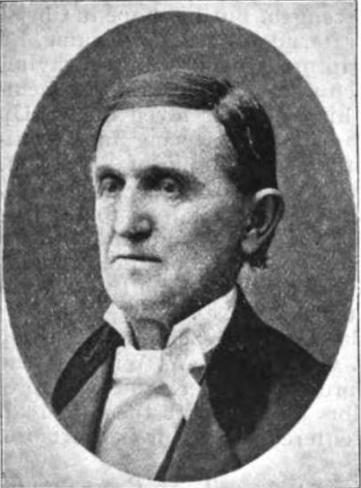
Elnathan Corrington Gavitt

On September 9, 1876, she married Rev. Elnathan Corrington Gavitt (1808-1896), an elder of the Methodist Episcopal Church.

After marriage, Gavitt continued with her profession, in which she was among the first in the State of Ohio. In January 1893, at Toledo, she founded The Woman's Medical Journal and served as its first editor-in-chief. It was devoted to the interests and advancement of woman physicians of the United States. After the 1915 establishment of the American Medical Women's Association and during its first seven years, the journal served as the association's official organ. It was distributed to women physicians as a means of communication and to further their professional progress. Other women physicians became physician writers, but Gavitt established the only historical record of its day that documented the activities of medical women.

== Personal life ==
Rev. Gavitt died in Toledo, Ohio, March 15, 1896. Dr. Gavitt spent the winter of 1897 in Southern California, and died on August 25, 1898.
