= Harriet Redmond =

African-American suffragist

Harriet "Hattie" Redmond
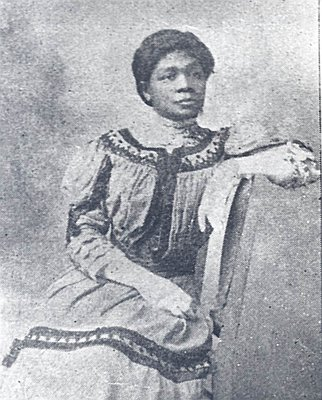
- Born: Harriet Crawford; Around 1862; St. Louis, Missouri, U.S.
- Died: June 27, 1952; Portland, Oregon, U.S.
- Occupations: Hairdresser, department store employee, domestic servant, janitor
- Known for: Suffragist
- Political party: Republican

Harriet Redmond (born circa 1862 – June 27, 1952), also known as Hattie Redmond, was an African-American suffragist who lived and worked in Portland, Oregon. She moved to Oregon at a young age where she then became an active member of the suffragist movement.

Redmond is best known for her efforts as secretary and then president of the Colored Women’s Equal Suffrage Association. After Oregonian women gained the right to vote in 1912, Redmond remained politically active by working on the campaigns of various Republicans.

== Family background ==
Hattie Redmond was the daughter of emancipated slaves, LaVinia Blue and Reuben Crawford. The family moved to Marysville, California in 1871, and then to Hood River, Oregon, permanently placing themselves in Portland in 1880.

LaVinia, who went by Vina, had a brother who lived in California, and their intention as a family was to always remain on the West Coast. Reuben first worked as a rope maker and then as an expert ship caulker, and he was named "the best ship caulker on the west coast" by The Oregonian in 1918. LaVinia stayed at home and also worked partly as a domestic servant.

Historical records do not definitively confirm how the family was able to finance the move from Missouri to California. However, the family may have relied on the Freedman's Bureau, which would have granted them railroad access since they were emancipated slaves leaving the south. Alternatively, Reuben's new job at a ship construction site may have paid for him to move.

Reuben Crawford was an active member of the Republican Party and the Colored Immigrants Aids Society. The Crawford family became a socially well-known family in Portland's African American community, which consisted of hundreds of individuals. The Crawford family attended Mt. Olivet Baptist Church, the first established black Baptist church in Oregon, where in 1912, Redmond held educational conferences on women's suffrage.

== Early life ==
Redmond was about 9 years old when the family moved to California and about 18 when the family settled in Portland.

Redmond likely grew up in a boarding house, since African Americans could not own property, and there were few single family homes available in the area at the time. Redmond attended Portland's Colored School, a public school for African American children. Her introduction to the church was at age 12 when her father signed her up to recite a poem that she wrote for Mt. Olivet Baptist Church's winter social. The poem was entitled "I'm So Happy," and it received a positive reception.

In November 1883, Harriet Crawford married waiter Emerson Redmond in her parents' home; he worked at Portland hotels, such as the Portland Hotel. However, it is reported that the marriage was unhappy, and her husband died at the Multnomah County Poor Farm on March 26, 1907. Hattie and Emerson Redmond did not have any children.

== Activism ==
Redmond was an active member of the Oregon Colored Women’s Council, an organization dedicated to helping black women in need. Later, she became secretary, then president, of the offshoot Colored Women’s Equal Suffrage Association formed in 1912. During this time, Redmond estimated that the low membership of the group, 14 out of 2,500 potentially eligible black women in Portland, stemmed from the lack of awareness for the benefits of suffrage as well as negative influence from husbands and families.

As part of the Colored Women’s Equal Suffrage Association leadership, Redmond organized meetings and lectures in churches around the city, particularly at Mt. Olivet Baptist Church. In 1912 she held educational conferences on women's suffrage there. She also served on the Central Campaign Committee which was a major director of the suffrage movement in Oregon. This committee united suffrage efforts from around the state and worked to foster cooperation between the different factions of the movement.

Ultimately, the suffrage movement succeeded and Oregon voters ratified women's right to vote on November 5, 1912. Redmond registered to vote as a Republican during April 1913. Redmond's work on campaigning for women's right to vote also laid a foundation for the civil rights activism which became prominent in early-20th century Oregon.

During the 1914 election season, Redmond and other activists who helped gain Oregon women the right to vote worked on the campaigns of several Republican candidates. The women on a campaign committee voted Redmond to be their vice president.

== Later life and death ==
Although jobs were limited for African American women at the time, Redmond was able to find work in a variety of positions. Her 1913 voter's registration card lists her profession as a hairdresser. At other times, she worked as a department store cleaner, a domestic servant, and lastly, as a janitor for Oregon's U.S. District Court. She served as a janitor for twenty-nine years until her retirement in 1939. That year's March 17 edition of The Oregonian recognized her service with an article entitled “Janitress Lauded for Long Service.” Also, upon her retirement, she received an autographed picture and a letter from the postmaster general.

On June 27, 1952, Hattie Redmond died of bronchial pneumonia at 90 years old.

== Legacy ==
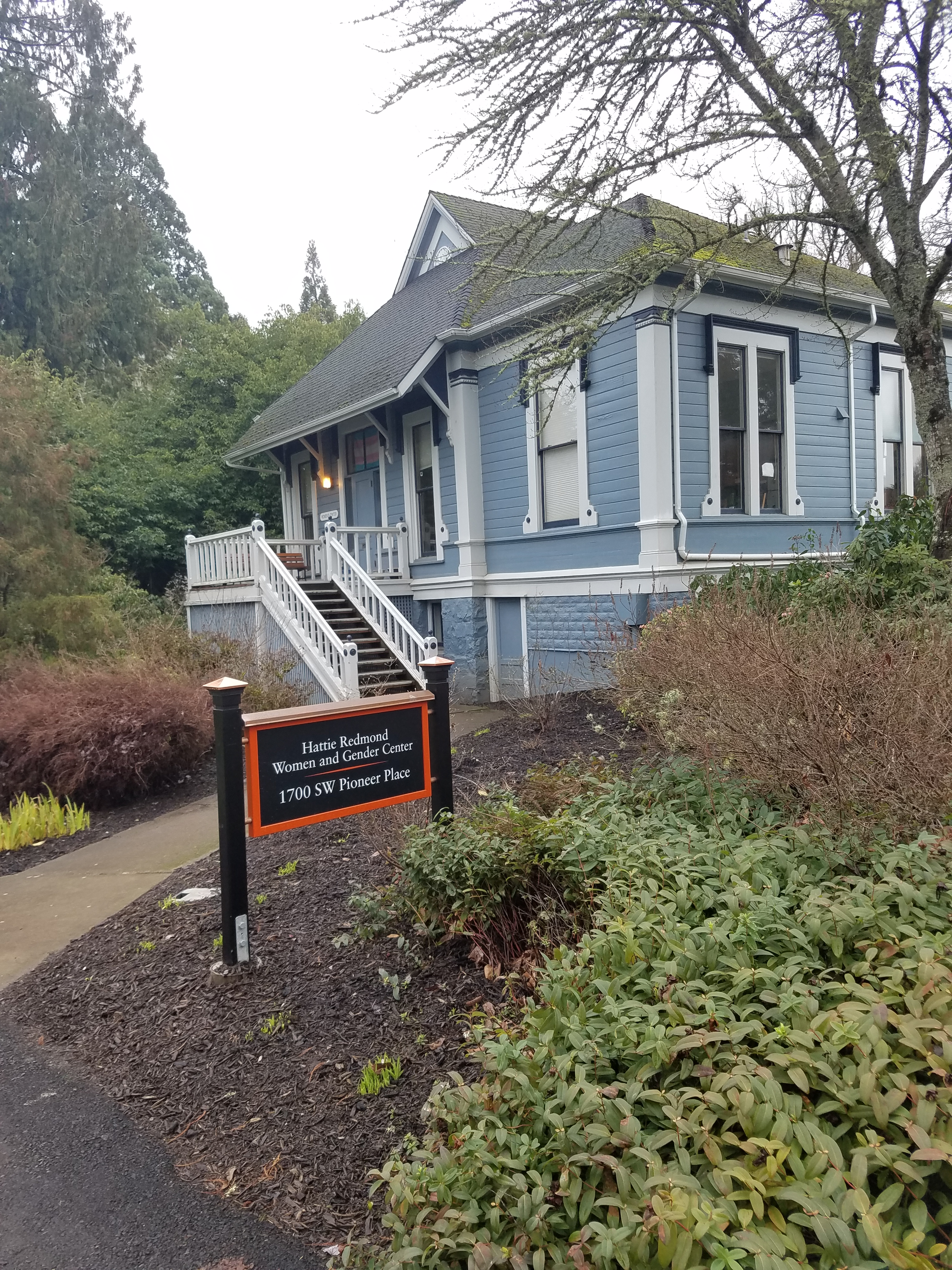
The Hattie Redmond Women and Gender Center at Oregon State University.

Redmond is buried at the Lone Fir Pioneer Cemetery. On July 21, 2012, the Century of Action Committee honored her and three other suffragists—Esther Pohl Lovejoy, Harry Lane, and Martha Cardwell Dalton—by installing new headstones for them at the cemetery. Before the replacements, they had become overgrown. Redmond's new headstone is inscribed with the words "Black American Suffragist". The installation ceremony included costumed portrayals of the four suffragists and was attended by Barbara Roberts, a former Oregon governor. This event took place as part of the Century of Action Committee's year-long celebration of 100 years of suffrage for women in Oregon and as part of their efforts to call attention to remaining voting barriers for minorities.

In July 2018, the president of Oregon State University, Ed Ray, announced that three campus buildings would be renamed due to their namesakes' racism. One of these buildings, formerly known as the Benton Annex, became the Hattie Redmond Women and Gender Center. The building was previously named for Thomas Hart Benton, an antebellum United States Senator from Missouri. The choice to rename it after Redmond was made to recognize her efforts as an Oregonian suffragist.
