= Mary M. Crawford =

American surgeon (1884-1972)

Mary Merritt Crawford
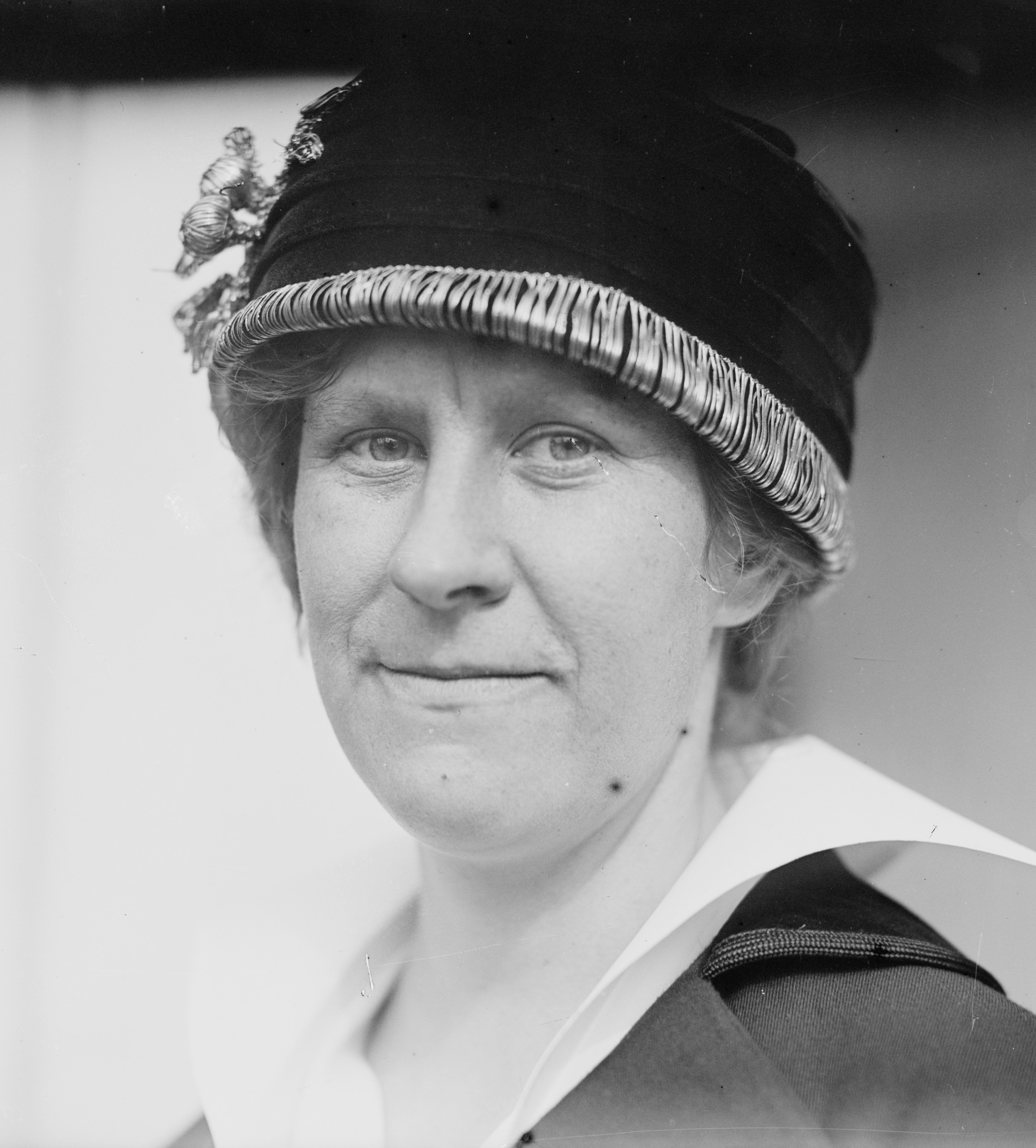
- Crawford in 1914
- Born: February 18, 1884; New York City, US
- Died: November 25, 1972 (aged 88); New York City, US
- Education: Cornell University
- Known for: Co-founder of the American Women's Hospitals Service

Mary Merritt Crawford (February 18, 1884 – November 25, 1972), known as Mollie Crawford, was an American surgeon. She was Brooklyn's first female ambulance surgeon, worked as a surgeon in France during the First World War, and co-founded the American Women's Hospitals Service.

== Personal life ==
=== Early life ===
Mary Merritt Crawford was born in Manhattan, the third eldest of eight siblings, on February 18, 1884, to Gilbert and Sarah Crawford. At the age of 2, she and her family moved to Nyack, where she grew up. Crawford's father was a lawyer, and she was initially inspired to follow in his footsteps, until - in high school - she developed an interest in chemistry and physics. She graduated from high school in 1899 as her year's valedictorian.

Crawford attended Cornell University, graduating in 1904, and received her medical degree from the same university in 1907.

=== Later years and death ===
Shortly after returning from the First World War, Crawford married Edward Schuster, who had proposed to her via cablegram. They had one daughter, Mary (born 1917).

Crawford retired in 1949, aged 65, and died at New York City's Midtown Hospital on November 25, 1972, aged 88.

== Career ==
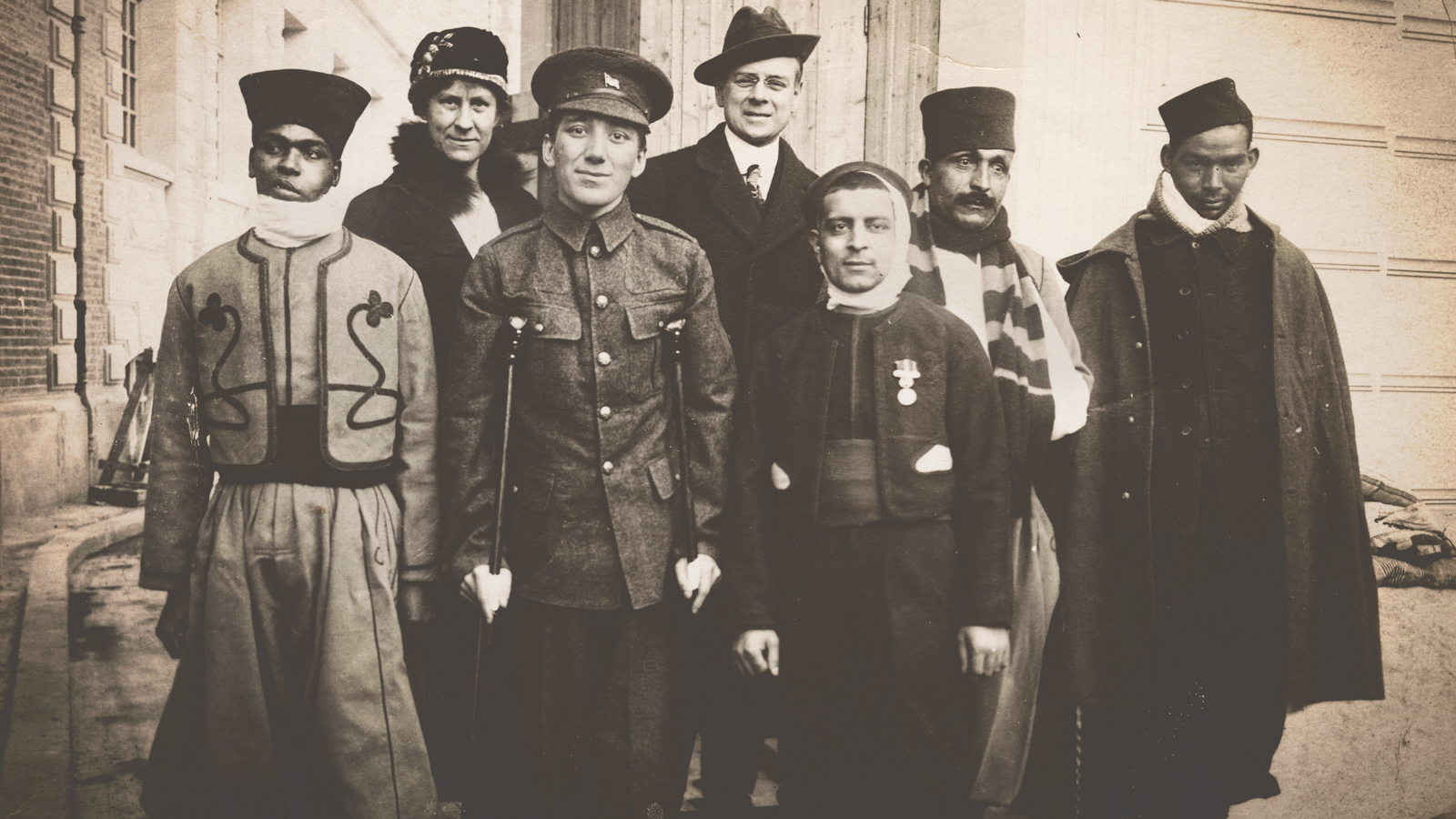
Crawford with patients during the First World War.

After obtaining her medical degree, Crawford earned an internship position at the Williamsburg Hospital. Internship advertisements at the time typically asked only for male students, but an oversight led to the Williamsburg Hospital not including that stipulation in their ad. Crawford applied, and gained the highest grade – out of 35 applicants, the others all male – at the entrance exam. Prohibited from attending preparatory quizzing sessions to study for the exam, Crawford was forced to study with a physician privately. Crawford's position made her Brooklyn's first female ambulance surgeon. Her first ambulance call was on January 15, 1908, to a man who had fallen from a window. Being the first woman on this ambulance service, Crawford created her own uniform for her work.

In 1910 she started her own medical practice in Brooklyn alongside her work at the hospital.

In 1914, following the outbreak of World War I, Crawford travelled to France as one of 6 American surgeons funded by Anna Gould to provide hospital and field services. One of only 55 women surgeons hired by the U.S. Army during World War I, Crawford was not eligible for rank or status in her position, being treated as a "civilian consultant" during her time in France. She served as an anesthesiologist and house surgeon at the American Ambulance Hospital at Neuilly-sur-Seine for a period of one year. In addition to her anesthesia work, Crawford also spent time supervising several wards, overseeing the dental ward, and assisting with facial reconstruction surgery.

After her return, Crawford gave lectures to raise money for hospitals in France, and – alongside Rosalie Slaughter Morton – led the American Women's Hospitals Service from 1917 after it was founded by the Medical Women's National Association with the aim of establishing American hospitals in Europe. She also volunteered at an American Red Cross station in New York City, after the United States joined the war.

Crawford was appointed as chairman of the Medical Women's National Association in June 1918. The following year, she led the creation of a medical department at the Federal Reserve Bank as its medical director, where she remained until her retirement in 1949. In 1927 Crawford was elected to the Board of Trustees at Cornell University, receiving 7,449 votes out of a total of 9,814, and in 1929 became the head of the health service for the American Woman's Association at their clubhouse.
