= Louise Hurrell =

American physician (1871–1958)

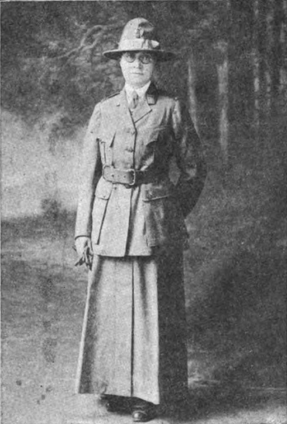
- Hurrell in 1919
- Born: M. Louise Hurrell; August 6, 1871; Fort Erie, Ontario
- Died: August 8, 1958 (aged 87); DeBary, Florida, U.S.
- Resting place: Saugerties, New York, U.S.
- Education: University of Buffalo School of Medicine (MD)
- Occupation: Physician

M. Louise Hurrell (August 6, 1871 – August 8, 1958) was an American physician and a member of the American Women's Hospitals Service in World War I.

== Early life ==
M. Louise Harrell was born on August 6, 1871, in Fort Erie, Ontario, to Agnes and Alfred B. Hurrell. Her father was a reeve and owned a general store in Fort Erie. At the age of four, she had infantile paralysis. She later became a naturalized citizen of the United States after moving to Buffalo, New York. She graduated from the University of Buffalo School of Medicine in 1902 with a Doctor of Medicine. She did graduate work at the Mayo Clinic in Rochester, Minnesota, and at London University. She interned at Athol Spring Infant Hospital.

== Career ==
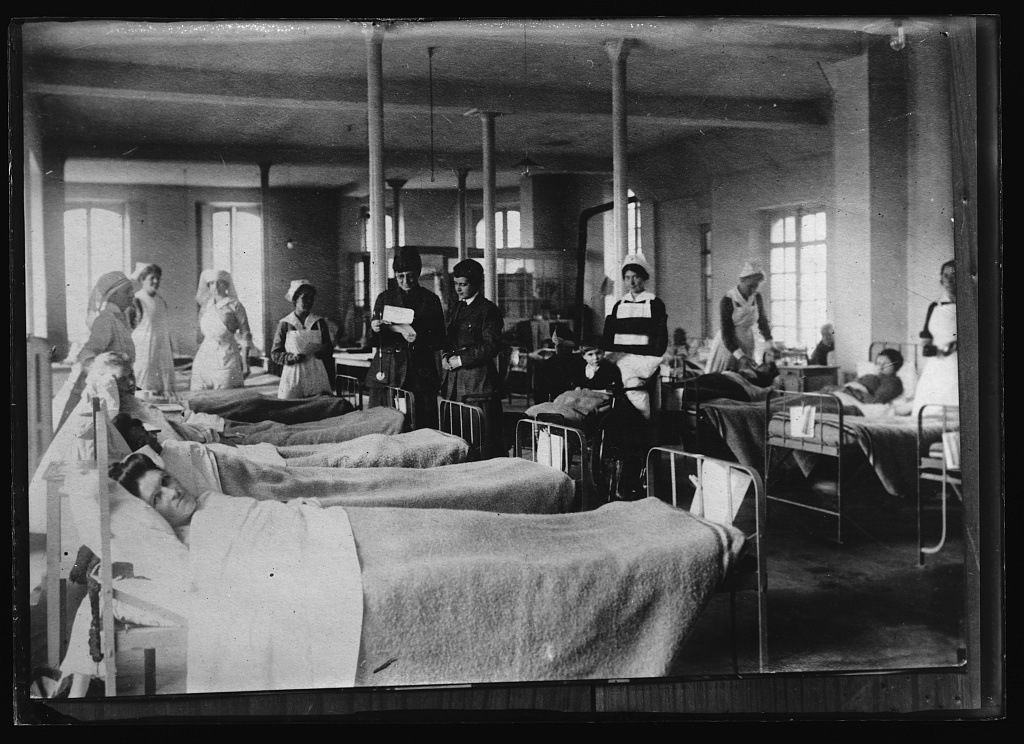
Women's ward of the American Women's Hospital, No.1, in Luzancy, France

Following her internship, Hurrell practiced medicine with her uncle Dr. Thomas Gilchrist Alling of Buffalo for 18 months. She then practiced medicine in offices in the Medical Arts Building in Rochester, New York. She went to France in August 1918 to join the American Women's Hospital, Unit 1 during World War I. The unit operated independent of the U.S. Army and under sanction of the French government. The unit was first located in Château Neuftiers, south of Château-Thierry. She became head of the unit in November 1918. The hospital would often care for refugees from battle who suffered from diseases like diphtheria and typhoid. Following the armistice, the hospital was moved to Luzancy. Under her leadership, she asserted that the hospital would not interfere with a civilian doctor's practice. In the summer of 1919, she moved to Blérancourt and established a tent hospital there. Following the war, she returned to practicing medicine in Rochester. She later retired in 1941.

Hurrell was a member of the Monroe County Medical Society, the Medical Society of the State of New York and the American Medical Association. In June 1916, she was elected as the fifth vice president of the alumni association of the University of Buffalo's medical department. She published the book The Doctors's Duffel Bag in 1920, which was about her experiences in World War I in France.

== Personal life ==
Hurrell lived on East Avenue in Rochester, New York. Following her retirement, she moved to a log cabin near Woodstock, New York, with her friend Jarretta K. Seger, an educator at State University of New York at Geneseo. They lived in Zena, New York, and later moved to Florida.

Hurrell died on August 8, 1958, at her home in DeBary, Florida. She was buried in Saugerties, New York.

== Legacy ==
For her service in World War I, Hurrell was awarded the Croix de Guerre with Palm. For her contributions in fighting typhoid, she was the only member of her unit awarded the Medal of Epidemics with Palm. She was made an honorary citizen of France by the government of France. In 1952, she was honored by the Medical Society of the State of New York for fifty years of service.
