= Fletcher Union Church =

Historic church in Vermont, United States

- U.S. National Register of Historic Places
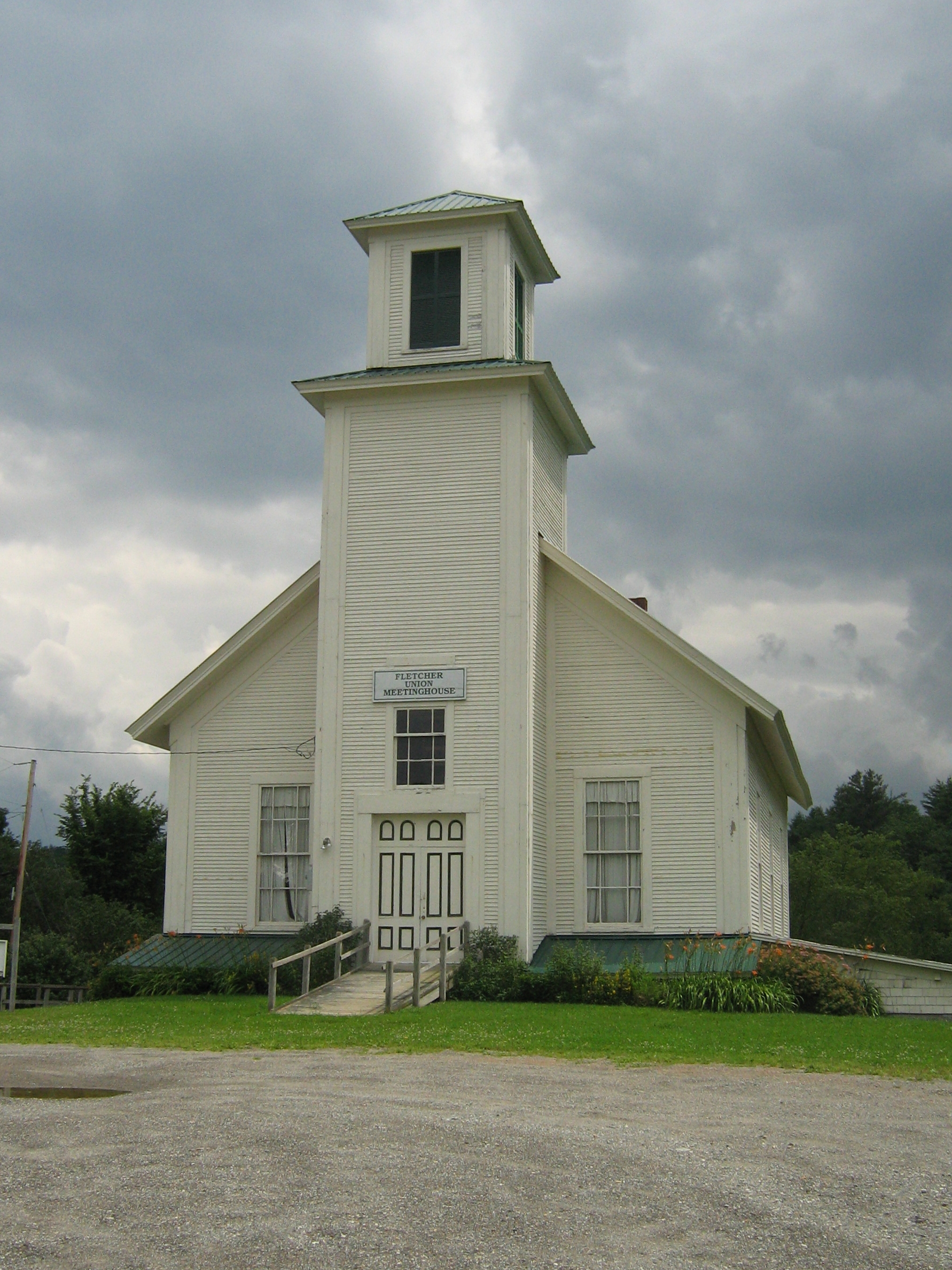

- Location within Vermont Location within the United States
- Location: TH 1 (Cambridge Rd.), Fletcher, Vermont
- Coordinates: 44°40′57″N 72°54′42″W
- Area: 0.1 acres (0.040 ha)
- Built: 1871
- Architect: Bingham, N. R.
- Architectural style: Italianate
- NRHP reference No.: 82001702
- Added to NRHP: May 17, 1982

The Fletcher Union Church, also known as the Fletcher Community House, is a historic former church building on TH 1 (Cambridge Road) in Fletcher, Vermont. Built in 1871, it is one of only a few public buildings in the small community, and has for over a century been a secular community meeting space. It was listed on the National Register of Historic Places in 1982.

== Description and history ==
The former Fletcher Union Church stands in a rural area of Fletcher, prominently visible on a rise at a bend in Cambridge Road east of Fairfax Road. It is a single-story wood-frame structure, set on a stone foundation whose rear is exposed on the sloping lot. It has a gabled roof with slightly elongated eaves, and its exterior is clapboarded. A square tower projects at the center of the front facade, rising through a tall and plain first stage to a smaller square louvered belfry stage capped by a shallow-pitch pyramidal roof. The main entrance is at the base of the tower, with a sash window above. The interior begins with a vestibule area, from which stairs rise to a gallery. The main hall has a stage at the far end, added in 1919. The basement houses a kitchen, bathrooms, and a dining or meeting space.

The church was built in 1871 by N.R. Bingham, a prominent regional master builder. It was a replacement for the town's first church, built in 1830 across the street from this location. Both the original and this church were union churches, built to provide facilities shared by a number of congregations. The last documented use of the building for religious purposes was in 1899, by a Universalist group. The town took over the building in 1908, converting it into a community meeting house. It has been used for community meetings, social events, and meetings of the local Grange chapter.

== See also ==
- National Register of Historic Places listings in Franklin County, Vermont
