= Esther Pohl Lovejoy =

American physician (1869–1967)

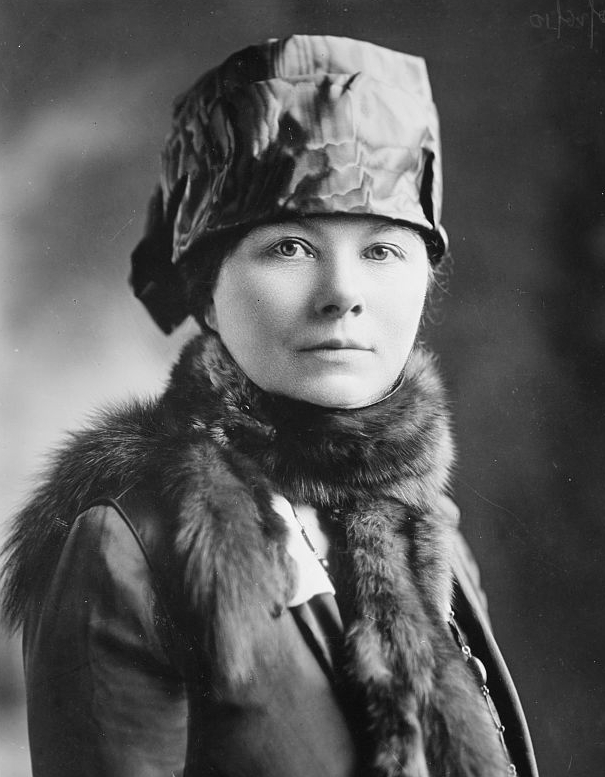
- Born: Esther Clayson; November 16, 1869; Seabeck, Washington Territory
- Died: August 31, 1967 (aged 97)
- Education: University of Oregon
- Occupations: Physician, activist
- Spouse: Emil Pohl (m. 1893–1911) (his death) George A. Lovejoy (m. 1912–1920) (divorce)

Esther Pohl Lovejoy (née Clayson; November 16, 1869 – August 31, 1967) was an American physician and public health pioneer, suffrage activist, congressional candidate, and a central figure in early efforts to organize international medical relief work. In 1907, Lovejoy became the first woman appointed to direct a department of health in a major U.S city: the Board of Health in Portland, Oregon. Lovejoy worked on the women's suffrage campaigns in Oregon in 1906 and 1912, and founded the Everybody's Equal Suffrage League ahead of the 1912 election, when Oregon became the 7th state to grant women the right to vote. Lovejoy was among the founders of the Medical Women's International Association and was elected as its first president in 1919. Lovejoy ran for the U.S. Congress in 1920 as the Democratic candidate for Portland’s Third District but was not successful against the sitting Republican. She was awarded the Elizabeth Blackwell Medal by the American Medical Women's Association in 1951 and 1957 for contributions to the field of medicine. On July 21, 2012, the Century of Action Committee honored her and three other suffragists—Harriet Redmond, Harry Lane, and Martha Cardwell Dalton—by installing new headstones for them at the Lone Fir Pioneer Cemetery, where their initial headstones had become overgrown. The installation ceremony included costumed portrayals of the four suffragists and was attended by Barbara Roberts, a former Oregon governor. This event took place as part of the Century of Action Committee's year-long celebration of 100 years of suffrage for women in Oregon and as part of their efforts to call attention to remaining voting barriers for minorities.

== Personal life ==
Esther Pohl Lovejoy was born Esther Clayson in a lumber camp near Seabeck, Washington, in 1869. Her father, Edward Quinton Clayson, who was an English seaman, originally came to America in 1864 after jumping ship. Three years later he brought the rest of his family to America and pursued many jobs, including a lumber merchant, farmer, and hotel manager to support them. Edward and his wife, Annie, eventually moved the family to Portland in 1883. Esther had five siblings: two sisters (Charlotte and Annie May), and three brothers (Frederick, Edward, and Will).

Before graduating medical school on April 2, 1894, Esther became engaged to her classmate Emil Pohl. A few weeks later on April 25, 1894, the two were married at Esther's home. After their wedding they started a private practice together in Portland, Oregon. Shortly after, they moved to Skagway, Alaska, where they worked together for the next two years.

While returning to Skagway by bicycle from Dawson, carrying with him gold within the runners of the sled his companions traveled on, Esther's youngest brother Frederick was murdered, with two other men, on Christmas Day of 1899 in the Klondike. The three corpses were found in the Yukon River after spring thaws (Fred's on May 30, 1900). George O’Brien was convicted for their murders by a Dawson, Yukon jury. He was hanged on August 31, 1901.

To honor her brother, Esther and Emil named their son Freddie, who was born in 1901, and Edward named his son Frederick H Clayson. After drinking contaminated milk and suffering from Septic Peritonitis, Freddie died in 1908 at 7 years of age. Following her son's death, Esther opened another private practice in Portland then pursued further training in Berlin in 1909. Her husband Emil stayed in Alaska for work, where he died in 1911 during an encephalitis epidemic. Esther re-married a Portland businessman named George A. Lovejoy in 1912; their marriage lasted 7 years, and they divorced in 1920.

== Education ==
Lovejoy was attracted to the field of medicine from a young age when she saw Belle Schmeer, a beautiful medical student at Willamette University, pass by her family's hotel every morning. As she walked to class, Lovejoy was constantly drawn to her professional and elegant aura. She was further inspired to enter the medical field in 1884 when she watched Dr. Callie Brown Charlton deliver her sister Charlotte. Dr. Charlton talked to Lovejoy about the medical field, explaining that she could make thousands of dollars a year in exchange for enjoyable work. Because of her lack of formal education and her family's struggles, the financial stability of the medical field furthered her interest. Although she considered a career in drama in addition to a career in healthcare, she ultimately chose to pursue medicine.

Lovejoy enrolled in the University of Oregon Medical School in 1890; during her studies, she worked as a cashier in department stores to earn money towards her tuition. After graduating in 1894 with the H.A. Wall Prize, which highlighted her academic achievements, she officially became the second woman to graduate from the University of Oregon Medical School, and the first to practice medicine.

== Work outside of Oregon ==
=== Alaska ===
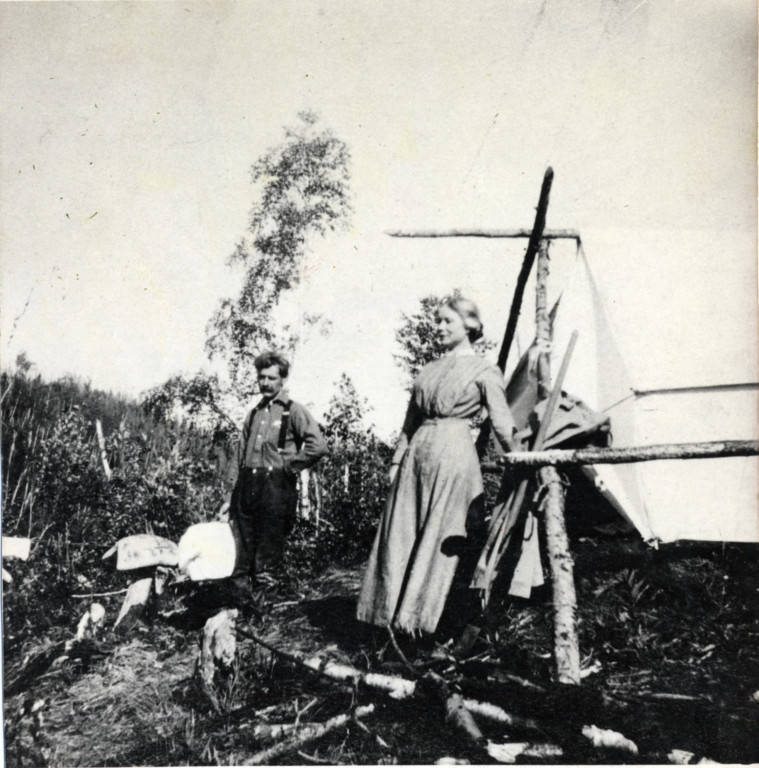
A photograph of Esther Pohl Lovejoy and Emil Pohl in Alaska.

Lovejoy's husband, Emil, and her brother, Fredrick Clayson, sailed to Alaska on July 30, 1897 to follow the discovery of gold. They were passengers on the George W. Elder, the first Portland ship that sailed to the Klondike region. The rest of Esther's family, consisting of her mother and three other siblings, followed in the coming year. After concluding her post graduate studies in Chicago in the spring of 1898, Esther also made the move to Alaska.

While in Skagway, a cerebrospinal meningitis epidemic ensued; because there was no drug to treat the disease and no caretakers to monitor the patients, many fell victim to the disease. For the duration of the epidemic, both Esther and Emil used their medical school educations to provide care. After the epidemic ended, Esther moved back to Portland in June 1889 while Emil continued to follow the gold rush around Alaska and advertise his expertise as a physician.

=== Europe ===
Around the time of the birth of her son, Esther's mother and sisters moved back to Portland for school and work. Eventually Annie, Esther's mother, moved into her Portland home, allowing her to embark on a journey to Europe and Palestine in 1904; while in Vienna, she performed studies in various clinics. Annie gave Esther the opportunity to continue to practice medicine, be an advocate for women's suffrage, and a pioneer in the field of public health while also getting to be a mother.

Lovejoy was very active during the First World War, where she used her efforts to study the effects of war and militarization on women. From 1917-1918, she traveled to France on the behalf of the Medical Women's National Association to study women and children in devastated areas. She found that many women were the victims of wartime violence in the form of rape, poverty, disease and dislocation. The war also sparked Lovejoy to publish a book and go on several speaking tours after traveling back to the United States; in her work, she advocated for equality between men and women through progressive action. While in France, she also worked with the Red Cross.

Lovejoy witnessed the burning of Smyrna, writing with disgust about Turkish soldiers, as they were committing atrocities against Christians in the city. She also blamed "the [Western] Christian Nations, responsible for the whole wicked business" who "held up their hands and maintained neutrality while the Turks wreaked their vengeance of the non-combatant people of Smyrna, most of whom were women and children". She proceeded to organize humanitarian relief efforts for the victims and refugees.

== Boards and affiliations ==
=== Portland Board of Health ===
Lovejoy was appointed to the Portland Board of Health by Harry Lane, the mayor of Portland in 1905. After two years she became the Portland City Health Officer, making her the first woman to lead a board of health in a major US city. During her appointment, she focused on goals such as providing pure food and water, improving garbage collection systems, and developing better disease inspections for school-aged children. She regulated the milk supply in Oregon and paved way for school nurses to receive funding; all of her efforts helped to establish Portland as a city with high sanitation standards.

Before leaving for Europe in 1909, she also established ties with several civic groups such as the Council of Jewish Women, the Consumer's League, and the Portland's Woman's Club. From 1907-1908, Lovejoy also helped prevent an outbreak of Bubonic Plague in the Portland area.

While serving on the Board of Health, Lovejoy was also an author of various documents that reside at Oregon Health and Science University (OHSU) in their Public Health in Oregon digital collection. Among these documents is an annual report that addresses the public health situation in Portland in 1908, including death rates and recommendations for further improvements of sanitation standards. She also authored a report that discusses impure milk and its effects on health and infant mortality, in addition to several other documents.

=== Running for Congress ===
Upon returning to Portland in 1920, Lovejoy decided to run for Congress as a progressive candidate against Clifton McArthur, the Republican incumbent. This was also the year that the 19th amendment to the US constitution, also known as the National suffrage amendment, was ratified. The first Red Scare was also rampant across the nation, causing the public to accuse Lovejoy of believing in Communism and supporting the Bolsheviks in the Russian Revolution. Lovejoy was still able to win 44 percent of the vote.

=== Medical Women's National Association (MWNA) and American Women's Hospitals (AWH) ===
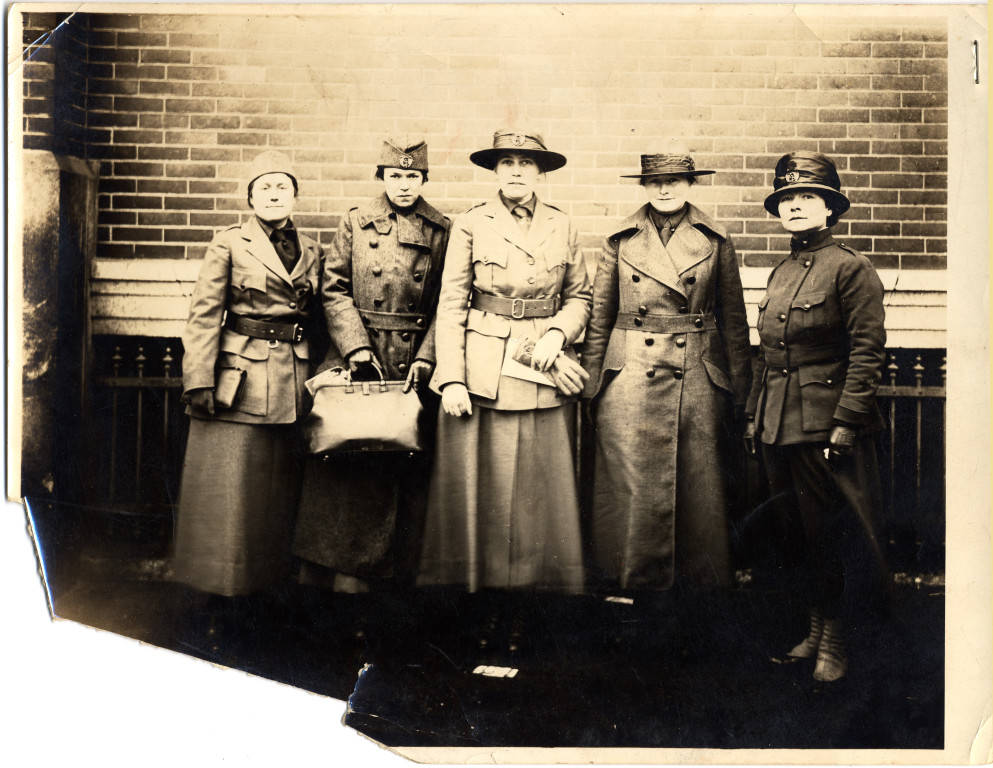
An image of Esther Pohl Lovejoy (far right) and other members of the American Women's Hospitals in 1918.

In 1915, the Medical Women's National Association (MWNA) was established to advocate for women physicians; the organization utilized petitions, rallies and various other efforts to try and grant officer status to the women serving in the US Army Medical Corps. Lovejoy herself argued that women were already performing medical relief work, and that they were prepared and eligible to organize their official service in the war.

Due to these efforts, the MWNA decided to establish a War Service Committee led by Dr. Rosalie Morton in June 1917. Subsequently, Lovejoy was appointed to be the chair of an additional committee on Maternity Service, which was established because maternity cases in areas of war were left to women physicians as a result of male physicians' service in the military.

In 1918, members of the Medical Women's National Association voted to establish Lovejoy as their first Vice President. The following year, Lovejoy was asked to be the new chair of the American Women's Hospitals (AWH), formerly referred to as the War Service Committee. She then became the MWNA's acting president months later after Etta Gray, the president at the time, left to provide care in Serbia. She led the AWH from her first appointment in 1919 until dying in 1967. Under her guidance, the AWH had many objectives, one of which was to provide services in the public health sector in addition to establishing various orphanages and clinics in war-torn areas.

During World War II in 1939, the AWH expanded their services by providing care in Greece, Britain and the Far East. The association ultimately provided service to victims of war in almost 30 different nations.

=== Medical Women's International Association (MWIA) ===
During the first World War, there were women physicians all over the world that were providing care in hospitals, clinics and volunteer organizations, no matter which side of the conflict their country was on. This prompted Lovejoy, acting president of the MWNA, to host an international conference that would allow women to share their stories and experiences. The conference was held in New York from September 15 to October 24, 1919; over 100 women physicians from 16 different nations were in attendance. Although they discussed a wide variety of topics, they were all centered around a common theme: women's health.

At the end of the conference, Lovejoy and the MWNA held a reception dinner for the international medical personnel and the members of the AWH returning from service abroad. The guests continued to share stories of war and service from around the globe, leading to the formation of the Medical Women's International Association (MWIA). The group's goal was to allow medical women of varying nationalities to continue to serve and share their work with each other. Lovejoy was elected as the first president of the association, serving from 1919 to 1924.

== Publications ==
After returning from France in 1918 and concluding her speaking tour, Lovejoy published a book titled The House of the Good Neighbor in 1919. The book described her trip to Europe and the work that she accomplished with the Red Cross and various charity hospitals. Before her death, Dr. Lovejoy wrote three additional publications:

- Women Physicians and Surgeons, published in 1938.
- Women Doctors of the World, published in 1957.
- Certain Samaritans, published in 1927, which outlined the many accomplishments of the AWH in Europe and abroad.

== Sources ==
- "Lovejoy, Esther Pohl". Hutchinson Dictionary of American History. Abingdon Helicon. 2005. p. 257. ISBN 9781423711193.
- "Esther Pohl Lovejoy, M.D.: A Global Vision for Women in Medicine and International Medical Relief". Symposium Announcement, WOU Website. Monmouth, Oregon: Western Oregon University. 2006. Archived from the original on 2006-09-02.
