= Bertha Van Hoosen =

American physician

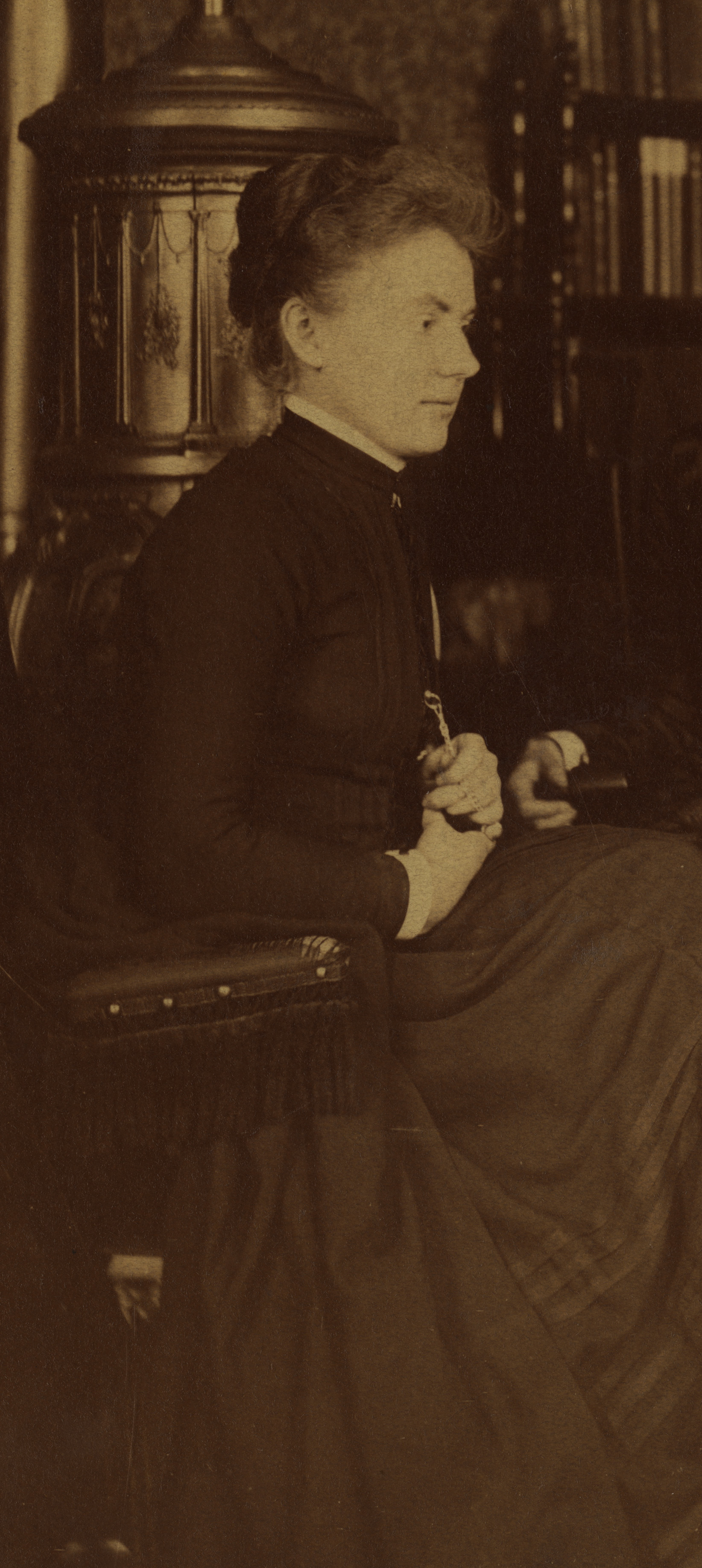
- Dr. Bertha Van Hoosen
- Born: March 26, 1863; Stony Creek, Michigan
- Died: June 7, 1952 (aged 89)
- Education: University of Michigan
- Occupation: Surgeon

Bertha Van Hoosen (March 26, 1863 – June 7, 1952) was an American surgeon devoted to women's health issues and the advancement of fellow women surgeons. Among other notable achievements, Van Hoosen was the first president and a founder of the American Medical Women's Association in 1915 and the first woman to be head of a medical division at a coeducational university. She published an autobiography detailing her personal experiences in medicine, Petticoat Surgeon.

== Early life ==
Bertha Van Hoosen was born to parents Joshua Van Hoosen, a farmer, and Sarah Ann Taylor, a teacher, in 1863 in Stony Creek, Michigan (now part of Rochester Hills). She grew up on her parents' farm and attended high school in Pontiac, Michigan, graduating at the age of 17. In order for Van Hoosen to attend high school, her father would drop her off in a horse-drawn wagon Monday morning and pick her up Friday nights at the conclusion of the school week.

== Education ==
Soon after graduation, Van Hoosen enrolled at the University of Michigan. During her undergraduate education she was drawn to the study of medicine, compelled by the opportunity to spend the rest of her life learning and advancing. As such, upon receiving her Bachelor of Arts degree in the University of Michigan's literary study in 1884, Van Hoosen enrolled in the University of Michigan's medical department.

Van Hoosen received almost no support in her pursuit of medical education. As her parents did not agree with her career choice and therefore would not fund her studies, she was tasked with paying her own tuition by working as an obstetrical nurse, an anatomy demonstrator, and a schoolteacher.

Despite this challenge, compounded with frequent harassment from male students, Van Hoosen graduated with a medical degree in 1888. She accepted a series of three residencies – first at the Women's Hospital in Detroit, then in the Kalamazoo, Michigan, State Hospital for the Insane, and finally the New England Hospital for Women and Children in Boston – totaling four years of additional training.

== Career ==
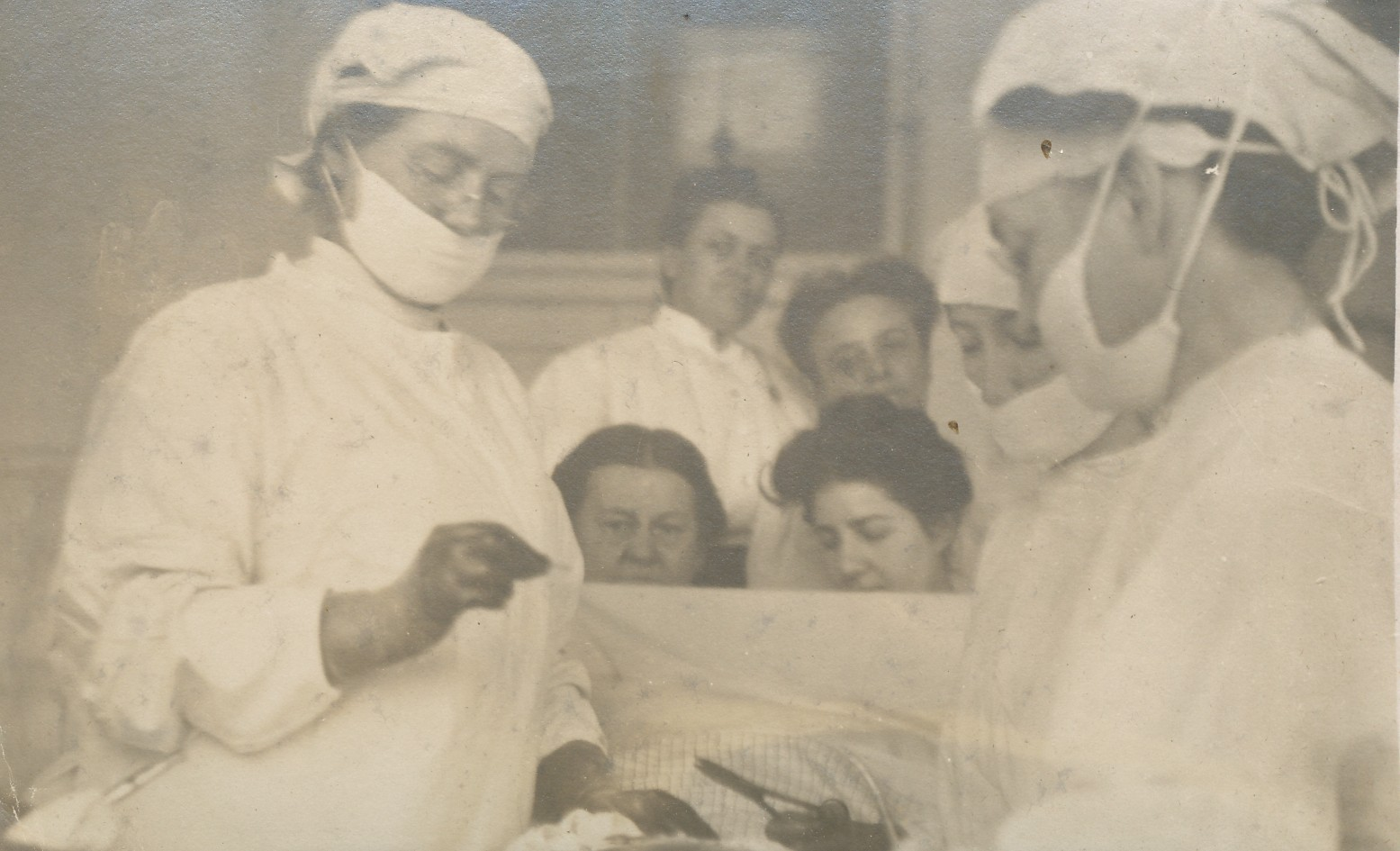
Dr Bertha Van Hoosen (left) in surgery, circa 1905.

In 1892, with money saved from her previous jobs, Van Hoosen opened her own private clinic in Chicago, Illinois. As the clinic grew, she taught anatomy and embryology at the Women's Medical School of Northwestern University and took a clinical assistantship at the Columbia Dispensary in Chicago, where she continued to learn about surgery and obstetrics. Her practice flourished.

In 1902, despite opposition from male faculty she became a clinical gynecology professor at the Illinois University Medical School, a position she would hold for 10 years.

In 1913, Van Hoosen became chief of the gynecological staff at Cook County Hospital in Chicago – the first woman to receive a civil service appointment at a hospital. Not long after, in 1918, her work won the respect of male colleagues and earned her position as Acting Head and Professor of Obstetrics at Loyola University Medical School.

Van Hoosen continued her private practice while serving as an attending physician at many Chicago hospitals. She taught sex education, established a breast milk bank, and advocated for the use of scopolamine-morphine anesthesia for childbirth. She also spoke against the medical establishment's discrimination against women and together with Marion Craig Potter founded the American Medical Women's Association in 1915.

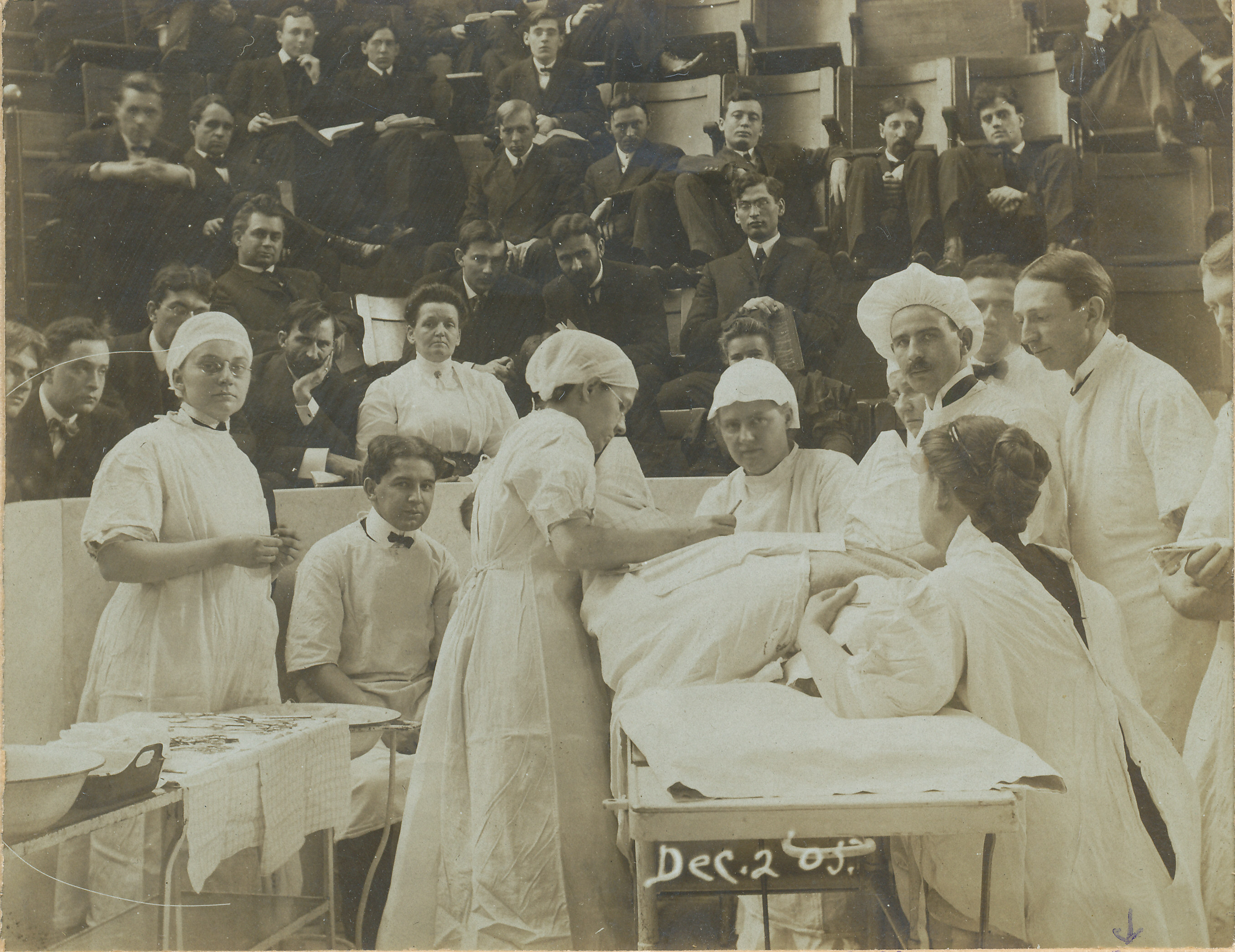
Bertha Van Hoosen overseeing an operation in 1905.

Throughout her career, Van Hoosen developed, illustrated, and promoted many medical techniques, including the "buttonhole" appendectomy surgical technique, the use of scopolamine-morphine as an anesthetic, and the emphasis on hygiene and sterilization of medical instruments to prevent infection.

== Travels ==
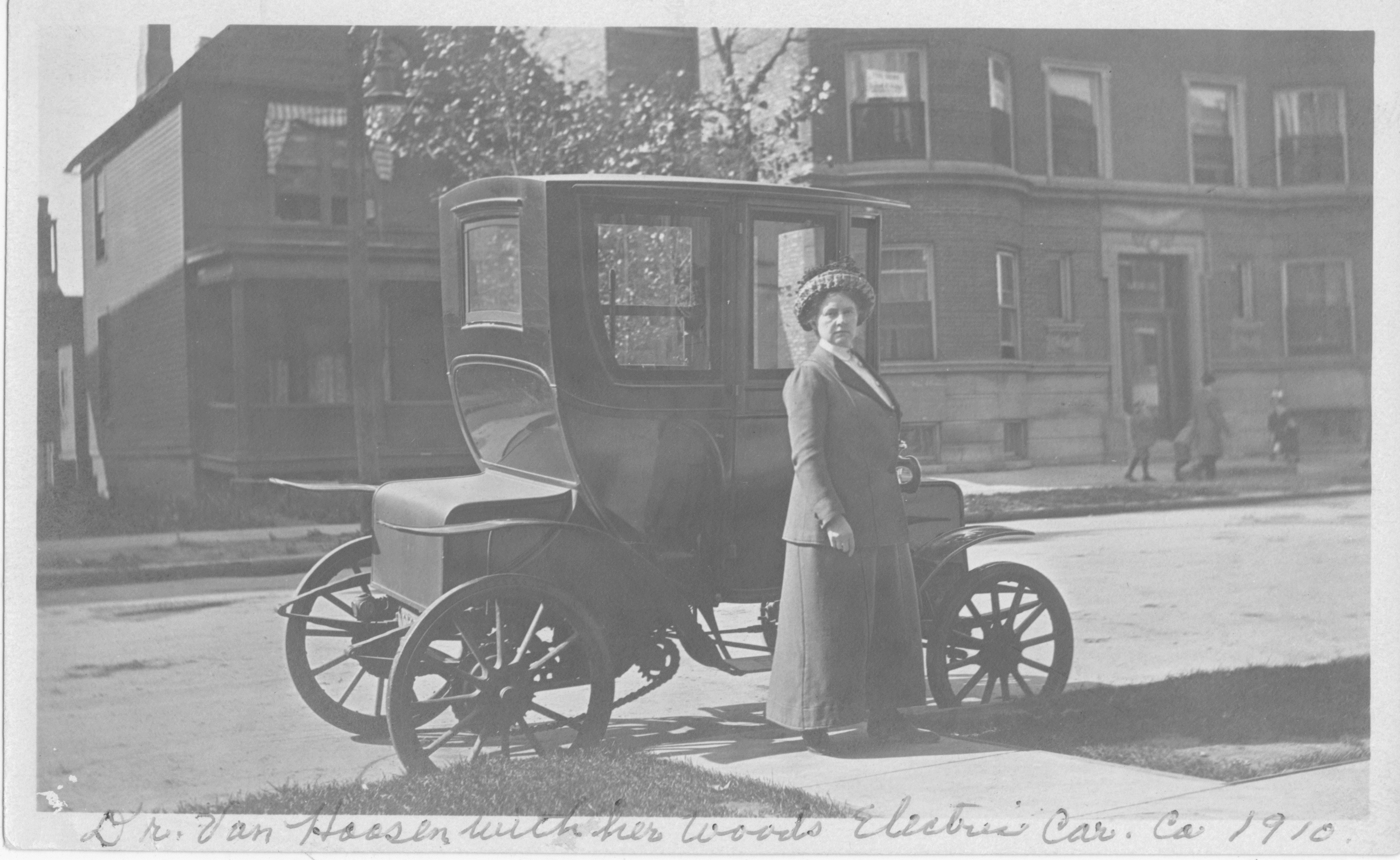
Dr Bertha Van Hoosen standing in front of her Woods Motor Vehicle

As recounted in the documentary Pioneer Family on Van Hoosen Farm, largely based on the account in Petticoat Surgeon, Van Hoosen was an extensive world traveler. In 1909 she used her first international convention in Budapest to start a year-long tour of Europe and parts of Africa. In 1929 she traveled via the Spanish liner Alfonso XIII with her sister Alice and was invited to Florence to meet with Pope Pius XII. In the year following the death of her mother, Bertha traveled with Alice and her niece Sarah via Honolulu to New Zealand, Australia and then to China and Japan. Their arrival in Japan coincided with the 1923 Great Kantō earthquake.

== Legacy ==
A plaque honoring Dr. Van Hoosen was erected in 1992 by the Illinois Mathematics and Science Academy and the Illinois State Historical Society inside the Fine Arts Building in Chicago. That building was a center of the women's rights movement during the 1910s, serving as home of the American Medical Women's Association as well as headquarters for the Illinois Equal Suffrage Association from 1910 until 1919 — the year that Illinois became the first state to ratify the 19th Amendment, which granted women the right to vote.

The Bertha Van Hoosen Award is given annually by the American Medical Women's Association to a woman who has served the organization greatly with her contributions. To qualify for the award, a woman must be an active member in the American Medical Women's Association for a minimum of five years.

Bertha Van Hoosen's name is still honored at the University of Michigan. The Van Hoosen House was dedicated in her honor at Bursley Hall.

She was inducted into the Michigan Women's Hall of Fame in 1984.
