= Marion Craig Potter =

Dr. Marion Craig Potter
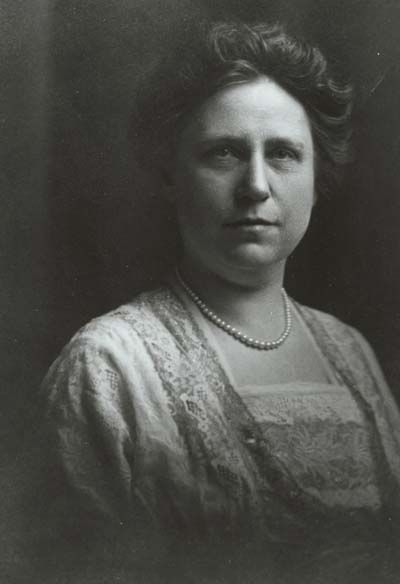
- Dr. Marion Craig Potter, physician
- Born: September 14, 1863; Churchville, NY
- Died: March 23, 1943 (aged 79)
- Occupation: Physician

Marion Craig Potter (1863-1943) was an American physician and women's rights activist. She was a founding physician with the Provident Dispensary for Women and Children, where she specialized in gynecology and venereal disease.

Potter introduced the diphtheria vaccine in upstate New York and was the first vice president of the Medical Women's National Association.

She was awarded the Cross of Saint Salve V by the King of Serbia for her work with Serbian children during World War I.

== Early life ==
Potter was born on September 14, 1863 in Churchville, New York. She was from a family of medical doctors. Her father was a physician named James W. Craig, M.D. and she had two sisters who also studied medicine. Her mother was Sarah Sherwin (Butterfield) Craig.

== Medical career ==
After initially studying to be an educator at Geneseo Normal School (i.e. State University of New York at Geneseo), she attended medical school at the University of Michigan, one of the first coeducational medical schools in the United States. She received her Doctor of Medicine in 1884 and joined her father's medical practice in Churchville, NY for two years before opening a practice in Rochester, NY in 1887.

In 1886, Potter became involved with the Provident Dispensary for Women and Children. The dispensary sought to provide care for impoverished women and children and provide training for medical graduates. While there, she specialized in gynecology and venereal disease. She became known for introducing the use of the diphtheria vaccine in upstate New York and has been attributed with saving many lives.

The Provident Dispensary for Women and Children eventually became part of the Outpatient Department of the Rochester City Hospital (i.e. Rochester General Hospital). Potter became part of the staff of the Woman's Clinic of the Outpatient Department of the Hospital, where she cared for patients who preferred a woman doctor.

In 1892, Potter worked briefly at the Louis Pasteur Institute in Paris, France. While there, she attended lectures by neurologist Jean-Martin Charcot at the Salpetriere teaching hospital.

Potter was an editor of the Women’s Medical Journal and was a lecturer at the Public Health Education Committee of the American Medical Association. She was a founding member and the first vice president of the Medical Women's National Association (later called the American Medical Women's Association); she was also a founding member of the Blackwell Medical Society.

Her medical publications include Germ Theory of Diseases, Venereal Prophylaxes, and The Adolescent Period.

== Public service and philanthropy ==
Potter was on the Committee of Medical Women of the Council of National Defense during World War I, and was a member of the Volunteer Medical Service Corps and the War Service Committee. With the National Defense Council, she collected, dated, and published the Committee's Census on Women Physicians with the help of the American Women's Hospitals Service. She also led fundraising efforts for the American Women's Hospitals Service for medical care for refugee children in Serbia.

In 1930, she was the delegate to the White House Conference for Child Care and Protection.

== Women's rights ==
Potter considered herself a suffragist and had a relationship with prominent suffragists including Susan B. Anthony and Frances Willard. She also worked with Clara Barton and the group of women who formed the American Red Cross.

== Personal life ==
Potter married Dr. Ezra B. Potter, Jr., a fellow physician in 1892. They had two children, James Craig Potter, born March 15, 1898 and Ezra Potter (July 3, 1901 – February 7, 1910). Her son James was also a doctor, specializing in infectious disease, and mother and son worked together from 1925 until her retirement in 1942.

She authored the non-medical books The History of Stained and Painted Glass and Home Economies.

== Awards and recognition ==
Potter was awarded the Cross of Saint Salve V by King Alexander of Serbia for her work on behalf of Serbian children during World War I.

She received a citation from the Alumni Council of the University of Michigan for distinguished service in the field of medicine.
