= American Women's Hospitals Service =

American charitable organization

The American Women's Hospitals Service (AWHS) is a charitable organization that funds medical care by supporting independent clinics to provide care to vulnerable populations and by offering travel grants to medical students and residents to perform clinical projects abroad. AWHS is affiliated with the American Medical Women's Association (AMWA), an organization of women physicians, medical students and others seeking the advancement of women in medicine. The organization was founded during World War I in response to the exclusion of military medical organizations such as the American Red Cross.

== Early history ==
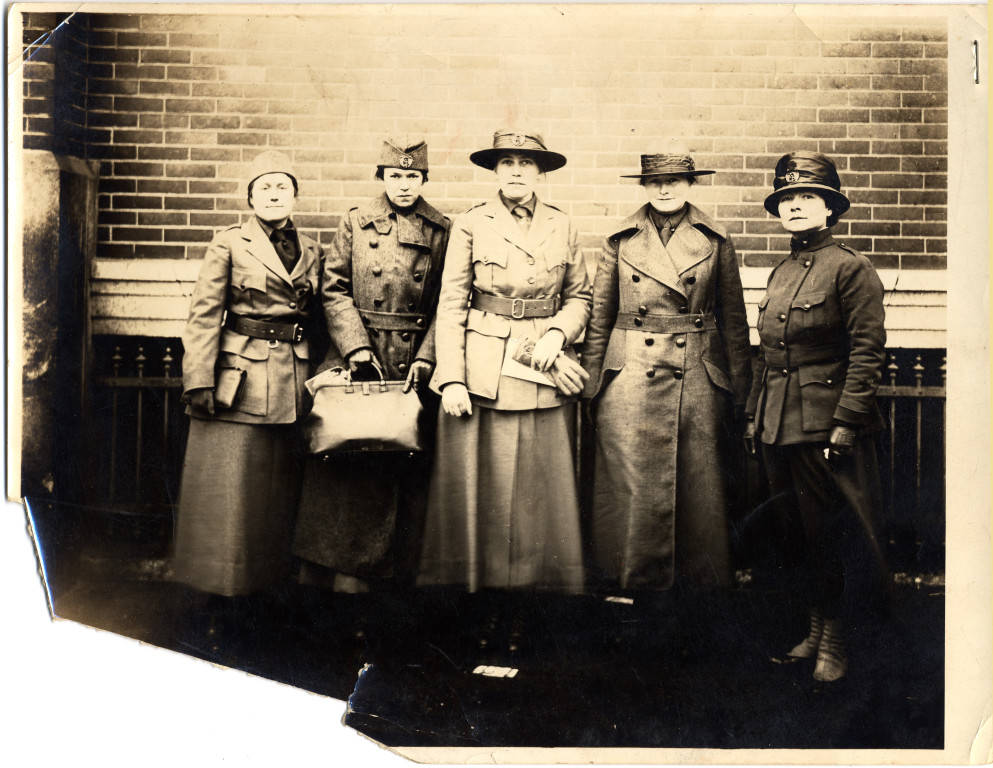
American Women's Hospitals personnel, including Esther Pohl Lovejoy, in 1918

In 1917 the Medical Women's National Association (which was later renamed AMWA) established a war service committee in order to create a census of the medical women in the country and to plan how to apply their resources to the war effort. World War I had already entered into its third year, women at that time were not accepted by military branches of the government, and the government had no plan to organize them for war service. Due to this exclusion, six women, including Mary M. Crawford, lead the AWHS in its early years, planning and executing an all-women-run hospital, three years before America got involved in the war. The war service committee, adopting the name American Women's Hospitals, decided that they wanted to provide individual medical service abroad and also establish military hospitals overseas.

The American Women's Hospital Service not only functioned as a medical relief organization but also as a network for women physicians. Within its first year of operation, over 1,000 women registered as physicians for war relief. Women who were often excluded from the official military medical corps were now able to participate in aiding the war. AWHS partnered with the Red Cross and civilian medical organizations to send abroad 62 AWHS volunteer doctors as well as 30 technicians and lay workers to France, Serbia, Palestine and Greece. AWHS also established its first hospital in Neufmoutiers-en-Brie, France, in July 1918. This hospital, financed entirely by AWHS, had 25 beds, a staff of 15 women including 3 dentists. In addition to sending women onto the front lines to provide medical care, AWHS also trained these women to provide aid abroad, specifically in France during the early years. In the US, AWHS arranged for hospitals for convalescent soldiers, for care for soldiers' dependents, and for laboratory training courses in order to address the critical shortage at that time of skilled lab workers.

The organization was the largest all-women’s medical group to work during World War I and was bigger than any other volunteer group. The main thing setting AWHS apart from other organizations was its mobility and responsiveness to changing battlefield conditions. Hospitals were not fixed but were constantly relocating as front lines shifted. Teams were dispatched close to active combat zones to provide immediate care to wounded soldiers. The hospitals and physicians were moved to areas where they were needed most. This flexibility allowed AWHS to function as a mobile medical relief organization, providing more than just hospital care.

In addition to treating combat-related injuries, the AWHS physicians also played a major public health role. Hospitals treated widespread infectious diseases such as dysentery, typhoid, and influenza as people were displaced. These diseases affected both soldiers and civilians. In many areas affected by the war, AWHS personnel served as one of the only sources of medical care, addressing injuries and ongoing pandemics.

== Experiences of Women Physicians During WWI ==
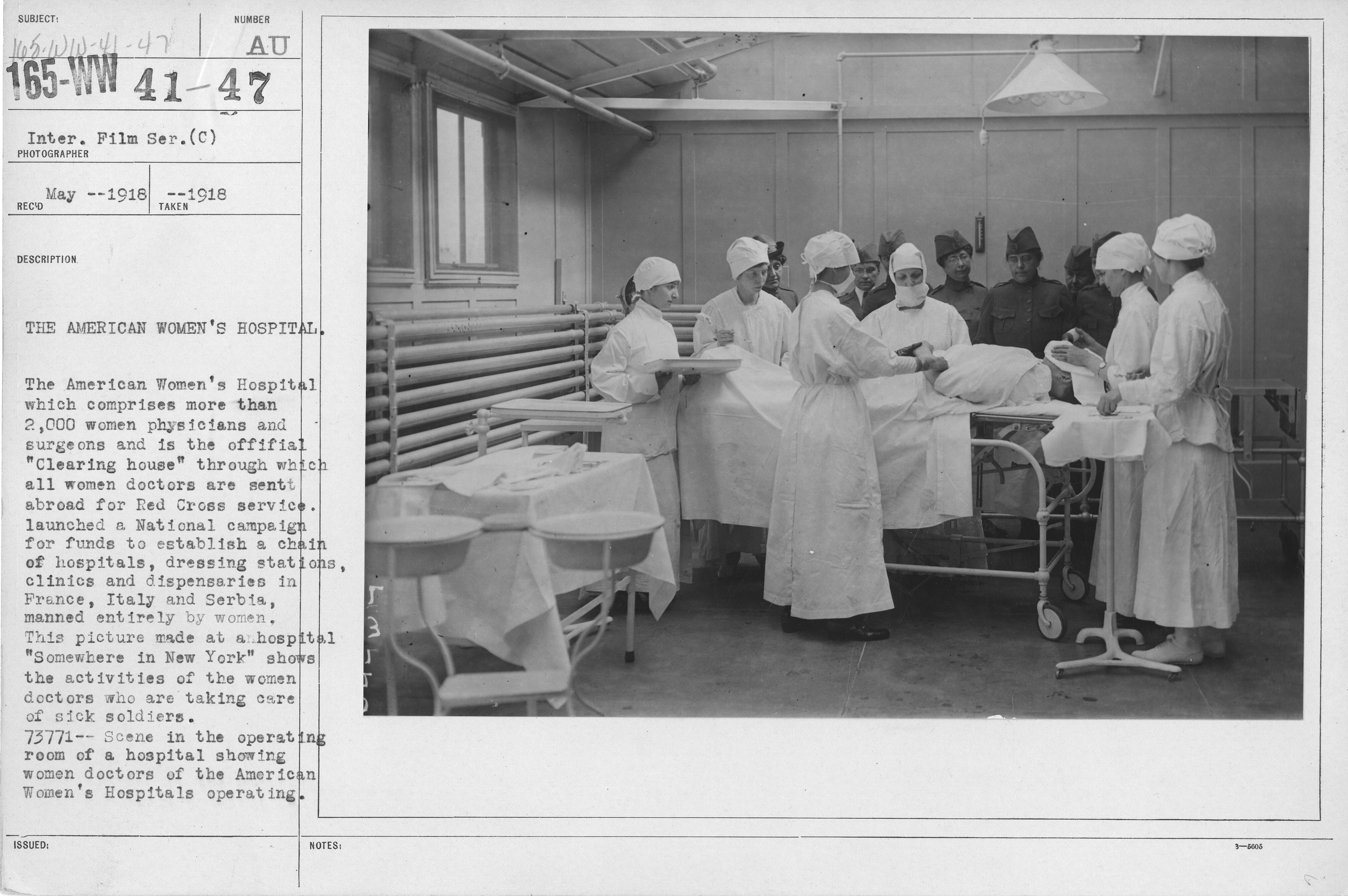
Women Physicians at work during WWI.

The American Women’s Hospitals were created due to the gender-based exclusion within the medical field during WWI. Women physicians were often denied official roles during war in medical organizations, specifically the military. This prompted them to form organizations to help aid in the war. The exclusion not only limited opportunities but also motivated women to assist and expand organizations like AWHS.

== After WWI ==
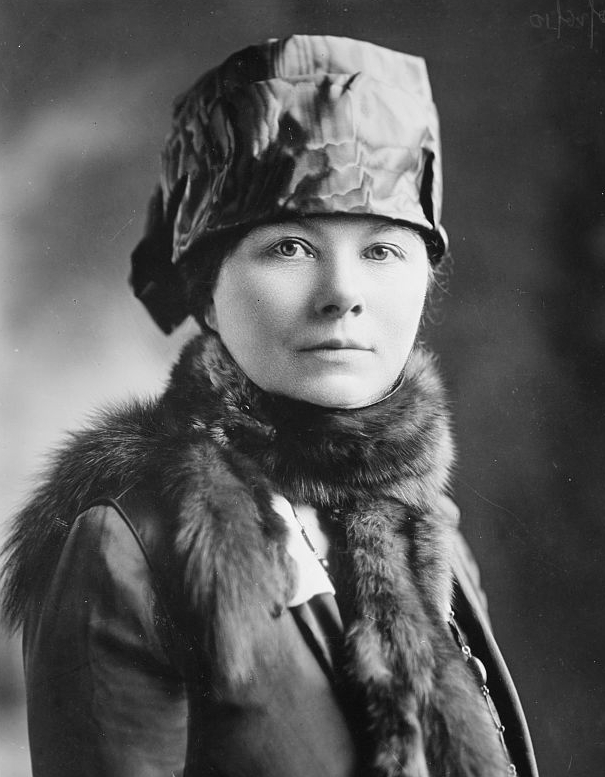
Dr. Esther Lovejoy, New Chairman of the American Women's Hospitals. From a 1919 publication.

Although the armistice was signed a year later, the ensuing local wars, revolutions, earthquakes, famine and millions of destitute refugees meant that medical assistance remained urgently needed around the world. AWHS expanded its service at home and multiple countries abroad in order to address the thousands who looked for help. Under the leadership of Esther Pohl Lovejoy, the AWHS transitioned from wartime care to long-term humanitarian support. Facilities that had relocated to Luzancy during the war continued to operate to treat infectious diseases and support communities as they recovered.

The AWHS valued working with local medical professionals and worked together to create policies that allowed for both groups to provide aid in foreign countries. Lovejoy emphasized the long-term effects of conflict on communities affected by the war, particularly women and children. Lovejoy shaped the direction of the organization, which continues to focus on providing sustainable medical relief and public health efforts during ongoing pandemics.

== World War II ==
During the Second World War, AWHS operated in Greece, Great Britain, and the Far East to provide medical relief. AWHS operated in nearly thirty countries, showing the growth that was achieved between the First and Second World Wars. From an emergency organization to a long-term relief organization, this expansion showed the significance of these women in the history of medicine. What started as a response to gender-based exclusion grew into a major international effort to bring medical care to communities in need. The organization highlighted both the contributions of women physicians and the broader role of medical humanitarianism in the twentieth century.

== See also ==
- Mary M. Crawford
- Mabel Evelyn Elliott
- Louise Hurrell
- Esther Pohl Lovejoy
- Rosalie Slaughter Morton
