= Ilien Tang =

Chinese educator

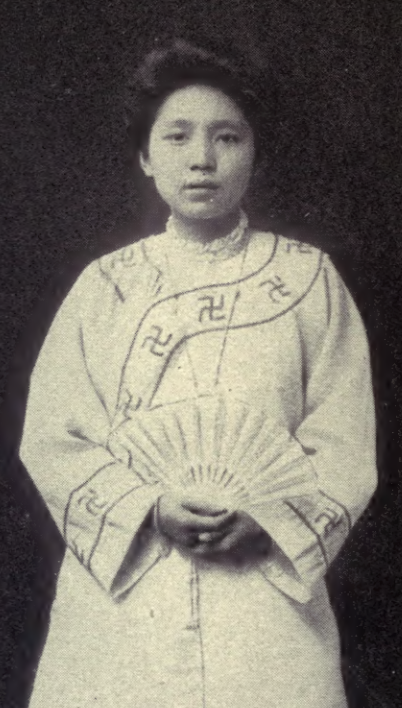
- Ilien Tang, from a 1911 publication
- Born: Kiukiang, China
- Died: May 18, 1920
- Occupation: Educator

Ilien J. Tang (died May 18, 1920) was a Chinese educator. She started and supervised kindergartens in and near Nanchang, and was vice-principal at the Baldwin Memorial School for Girls.

== Early life and education ==
Tang was born in Kiukiang (Jiujiang), and attended the Rulison-Fish Memorial School, a Methodist missionary school in that city. American missionary Gertrude Howe, mentor to western-educated Chinese physicians Ida Kahn and Mary Stone, helped Tang go to the United States in 1898. She graduated from Central Wesleyan College in Warrenton, Missouri, and completed kindergarten teacher training in Minneapolis. She also studied at Columbia University later in life. Her brother, known as John Tang, attended law school in the United States.

== Career ==
Tang spoke at church and YWCA events in the United States during her student years. She returned to China in 1906. In 1907, she and missionary Welthy B. Honsinger opened a kindergarten together at Nanchang. She established several other kindergartens, and supervised them; she also compiled a book of clapping songs for kindergarten use. She was assistant to Honsinger when the latter woman was head of the Baldwin Memorial School for Girls at Nanchang, including during its rebuilding after a fire.

Tang was one of the leaders and speakers at the First Student Conference for Women in China in 1907, and at the Second Student Conference in 1908, both sponsored by the YWCA. She was featured as one of the "professional women of China" in a 1914 article by Mary Stone. She gave lectures to church and community groups during her return visit to the United States in 1918.

== Personal life ==
Tang lived with her colleague Welthy B. Honsinger, and adopted two children, a son named Joyce and a daughter named Carolyn. She died in 1920, after "months of intense suffering". "Though dead, Miss Tang lives," said an American friend, Catherine Baker. "She lives in the hearts of many whom she often comforted and advised; she lives in the hearts of Nanchang students, to whom she gave her life and love; she will live always in the hearts of little children."
