= Shanghai Ninth People's Hospital =

Shanghai Ninth People's Hospital (Chinese: 上海第九人民医院)

Geography
- Location: No. 639, Zhizaoju Road, Huangpu District, Shanghai, China

Organisation
- Type: general, 3A
- Affiliated university: Shanghai Jiao Tong University School of Medicine

History
- Founded: 1920

Links
- Website: https://www.9hospital.com.cn

The Shanghai Ninth People's Hospital, shortly "Shanghai Ninth Hospital" is an affiliated hospital of the School of Medicine, Shanghai Jiao Tong University in Shanghai City, China. Founded in 1920, Shanghai Ninth People's Hospital has developed into a comprehensive Grade A tertiary hospital featuring plastic and reconstructive surgery, and stomatology.

== History ==
In 1920, the "Bethel Hospital" and the "Bethel Nursing School" were established by Mary Stone (doctor) and American missionary Jennie V. Hughes. The purpose was to save lives and train surgeons.

In 1952, the Bethel Hospital was renamed "Shanghai Ninth People's Hospital", and the nursing school was renamed "Shanghai Municipal Second Nursing School".

In 1964, it became an affiliated hospital of the Shanghai Second Medical University.

In 2005, Shanghai Second Medical University merged with Shanghai Jiao Tong University to form the Shanghai Jiao Tong University School of Medicine, and the hospital was renamed the "Ninth People's Hospital affiliated with Shanghai Jiao Tong University School of Medicine".

In October 2015, the Third People's Hospital affiliated with Shanghai Jiao Tong University School of Medicine merged into the Ninth People's Hospital.

In September, 2019, the Stomatological Hospital affiliated with Anhui Medical University and the Ninth People's Hospital signed a strategic cooperation agreement.

In January 2021, the National Health Commission issued the "Notice on the Establishment of National Stomatological Centers," deciding to establish National Stomatological Centers based on Peking University School of Stomatology, West China School of Stomatology of Sichuan University, and the Ninth People's Hospital Affiliated to Shanghai Jiao Tong University School of Medicine. On September 28 of the same year, the Pudong Campus of the Ninth People's Hospital entered trial operation.

In the Fudan Edition "2023 China Hospital Ranking", Shanghai Ninth People's Hospital was rated A+++ in overall reputation and ranked 1st in Plastic Surgery, 3rd in Stomatology, and 6th in Otorhinolaryngology.

In 2024, The International Medical Services (IMS) department was founded at No.1908 Gaoke West Road in Pudong New District.

In March 2026, Shanghai Ninth People's Hospital opened a new branch in Zhuqiao, Pudong New Area.

== Current situation ==
Now, Shanghai Ninth People’s Hospital is a comprehensive facility, integrating medical care, teaching, and research. There are 2,150 beds, 1,000 chairs for stomatological treatment, 52 clinical departments, and more than 5,000 employees including four members of the Chinese Academy of Engineering.

The hospital is well known for plastic and reconstructive surgery, orthopaedics and stomatology. It is China’s biggest teaching and training base in the field of reconstructive surgery.

Annually, the hospital serves about 4.58 million emergency outpatient visits, 130,000 inpatients, 100,000 inpatient surgeries, and 170,000 outpatient surgeries.

Shanghai Ninth People's Hospital published 126 papers listed in Nature Index for the Time frame of 1 January 2025 - 31 December 2025, ranking 54th globally and 15th in China in healthcare.

== Campuses ==
There are

- The southern campus, located at No. 639, Zhizaoju Road, Huangpu District, Shanghai, China,
- The northern campus, at 280 Mohe Road, Baoshan District, Shanghai,
- The eastern campus, at 1908 Gaoke West Road,
- The high-tech park, at 115 Jinzun Road.

In addition, there is the Huangpu Branch general hospital located at No. 58 Puyu East Road. It opened to the public on July 2, 2018. It was formed by the merger of Shanghai Huangpu District Central Hospital, Shanghai Second People's Hospital, Huangpu District Infectious Disease Hospital, and Huangpu District Maternal and Child Health Hospital.

== Events ==
On September 8, 2022, China.com.cn Finance reported that the Ninth People's Hospital affiliated with Shanghai Jiao Tong University School of Medicine was fined over 1.76 million yuan RMB for failing to comply with government-guided prices. This included the confiscation of illegal gains of 880,690 yuan and a fine of 880,690 yuan.

== See also ==
- Shanghai Jiao Tong University School of Medicine
- List of hospitals in China
