= GIH =

GIH may refer to:

- Andrew Gih (1901–1985), Chinese Christian evangelist
- Githabul language
- Gymnastik- och idrottshögskolan, a Swedish college of sports and exercise science
