= SS Santa Cruz =

SS Santa Cruz may refer to:

- SS Santa Cruz (1903), a later name for SS Manchuria (1903) which served briefly as the naval transport USS Manchuria (ID-1633) United States Navy transport during World War I then was renamed President Johnson 1928 with World War II service as a War Shipping Administration troopship serving Army requirements, sold, renamed Santa Cruz from 1947–52; scrapped in 1952
- SS Santa Cruz (1913), a 4,665 GRT ship built by William Cramp & Sons
- SS Santa Cruz (1921), a 3,862 GRT ship built by Fairfield Co., Ltd. of Glasgow, Argentine Government (Yacimientos Petrolíferos Fiscales)
- SS Santa Cruz (1938), a 3,862 GRT ship built by Deutsche Werft AG of Hamburg became German auxiliary cruiser Thor
- SS Santa Cruz (1941), a Type C1-B ship originally allocated to the Grace Line, then a War Shipping Administration troopship during World War II, built by Bethlehem Steel Company, San Francisco originally named Cape San Martin scrapped 1963
