= Phebe Stone =

Physician in China (1891–1930)

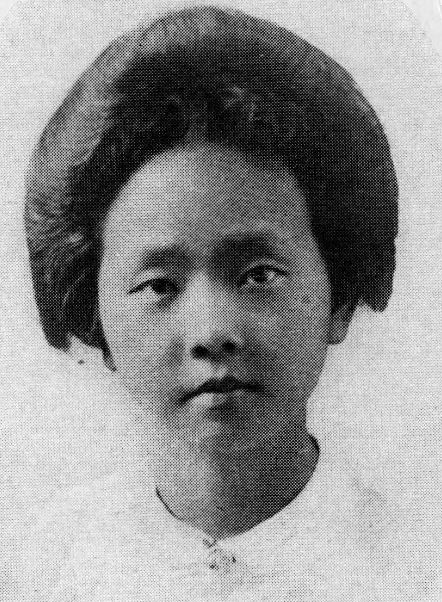
- Phebe Stone, from the 1915 yearbook of Goucher College
- Born: 1891; Jiujiang
- Died: May 1930 (aged 38–39)
- Occupations: Physician, missionary, hospital founder
- Relatives: Mary Stone (sister)

Phebe Stone (1891 – May 1930) was a physician and medical missionary who worked in Kiukiang (Jiujiang), China. She was the younger sister of the notable missionary Mary Stone, also known as Shi Meiyu. Her family was from the Hubei province in China and were one of a handful of Christians in the area. Stone went on to Goucher College in the United States for her undergraduate degree and later was awarded a fellowship to attend Johns Hopkins, where she received medical degree in 1918. Stone was the first Chinese woman to graduate from Johns Hopkins School of Medicine. Afterward, Stone briefly worked as a medical intern at a women's hospital in Worcester, Massachusetts, then returned to her hometown of Jiujiang to take over the Danforth Hospital established by her sister Mary. She later founded the Bethel Mission and its encompassing hospital in 1920 along with Mary and the American missionary Jennie Hughes. She contracted tuberculosis and died in 1930.

== Early life ==
Phebe Stone was born around 1891 to the Shih family, a respected Christian household in the city of Jiujiang, China. Stone's father was a Christian preacher and one of the first converts to Christianity in central China along with his wife. He had Stone and her sisters receive a Christian education from an early age that emphasized western customs, including having unbound feet, which went against the Chinese custom at the time for women to practice foot binding. Under the American missionaries Gertrude Howe and Lucy Hoag, as part of the Woman's Foreign Missionary Society, Stone studied Christianity at the Rulison-Fish Memorial School in Kiukiang. After completing high school, Stone went on to Goucher College in the United States for her undergraduate degree from 1910 to 1914, where she graduated with honors. During the summers in college, she studied with her sister, Mary, at the Danforth Hospital in China, which Mary had established. This reinforced Stone's interest in the medical field and spurred her on to the Johns Hopkins University School of Medicine, where she had won a prestigious fellowship. She graduated from the institution in 1918, making her the first Chinese woman to graduate from the school. After receiving her medical degree, Stone interned briefly at a women's hospital in Worcester, Massachusetts, before returning to China to take over her sister's position at the Danforth Hospital.

== Missionary work ==
In 1919, Stone and the nurse Lillian Wu, also a Johns Hopkins graduate, were recruited by the Woman's Foreign Missionary Society (WFMS) to work at the Elizabeth Skelton Danforth Memorial Hospital in Jiujang, a mission hospital sponsored by the Methodist Episcopal Church and the WFMS. Stone's sister was the founder and previous superintendent of the Methodist hospital, and Stone was chosen to replace her as the superintendent when she resigned. During Stone's time at the Danforth Hospital, she attended to patients, oversaw and taught the nurses, and spread awareness about both western medicine and Christianity. Her main area of expertise was obstetrics, and she detailed several cases in letters to her sister in 1919 and 1920, such as removing sebaceous and ovarian cysts, in addition to obstetrics cases. Stone also contributed to the growth of the hospital, initiating several renovation and expansion projects. As superintendent, she had the hospital floors varnished and roof renovated and upgraded the sewage system that had experienced frequent flooding. She also saw the need for patient gowns, as patients had previously worn their unhygienic personal clothing in the clean hospital beds. Additionally, as reporter Mary Ninde Gamewell noted, Stone added a laboratory, examining rooms, a recreational space for patients, and renovated patient bed overflow areas, all while remaining in the mission hospital's budget. Outside of the hospital, Stone continued practicing Christianity, becoming president of the Epworth League, an association for young adult Methodists, in 1919.

In 1920, Stone left her position at Danforth to establish the Bethel Mission and Hospital with her sister. At Danforth, she and her sister grew frustrated of the pay disparity between Chinese and American nurses and hospital administrators that did not change despite their complaints with the WFMS representatives who oversaw the hospital budget. At the Bethel Mission, Stone was able to have more control of her responsibilities and finances all while continuing her medical work in the hospital and evangelism through the mission's church. She was known as one of the best doctors in the area because of her medical and surgical skill as well as her genuine and kind personality. Many patients who came to Bethel requested her personally as a physician because of her reputation.

== Later life ==
In 1926, Stone contracted tuberculosis and thus reduced her medical role and instead focused primarily on evangelism through the Bethel Mission. She died in May 1930, and her last rites and funeral service was held in the Bethel Tabernacle and Huangjao Cemetery, where "upwards of a thousand people" gathered to mourn her death.
