= Bethel High School (Hong Kong) =

High School in Hong Kong

Coordinates: 22.4760°N 114.0498°E

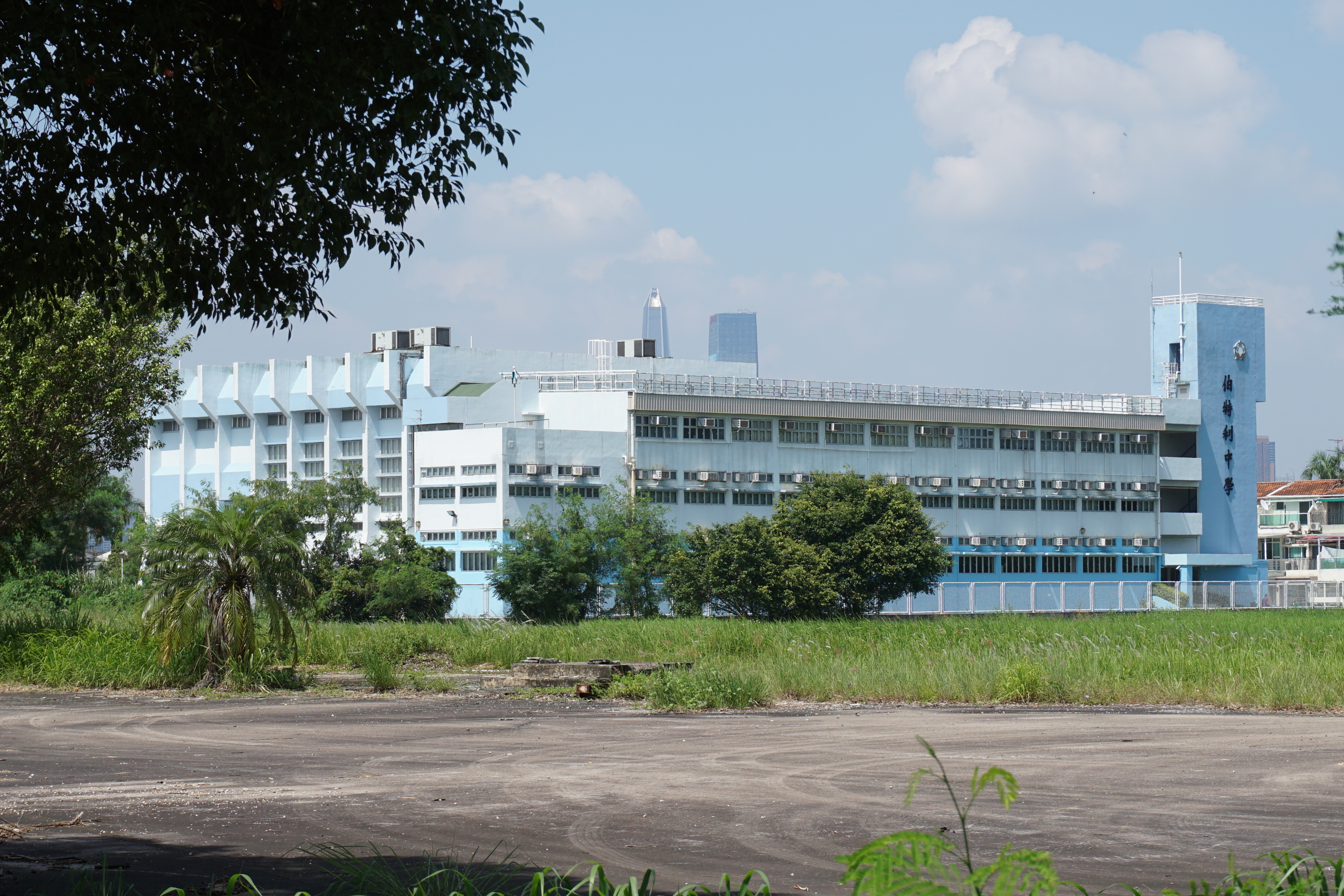
Bethel High School

Bethel High School 伯特利中學 was established in 1922 as part of the Bethel Mission in Shanghai, by Shi Meiyu (Mary Stone, or Shek Mei Yuk in Cantonese) and the American missionary Jennie V. Hughes. It later moved to Hong Kong in 1950. It is currently located in Fairview Park, Yuen Long.
