= Bethel Mission, Shanghai =

Evangelical mission established in 1920

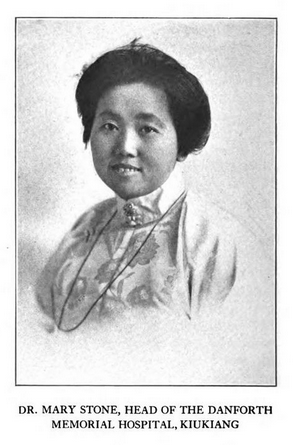
Mary Stone, from a 1918 publication.

The Bethel Mission in Shanghai (Chinese: 伯特利教會; pinyin: Bótèlì Jiàohuì) was an independent evangelistic institution established by Shi Meiyu (also known as Mary Stone), Phebe Stone, and Jennie V. Hughes in 1920. It would eventually include primary and secondary schools, a hospital and nursing school, an orphanage, and, through a revival led by Paget Wilkes in 1925, the Bethel Bible School (Chinese: 伯特利聖經學院; pinyin: Bótèlì Shèngjīng Xuéyuàn).

== History ==
After receiving her medical degree at the University of Michigan in 1896, the Chinese medical doctor and bible woman Shi Meiyu returned to China and practiced medicine in the Danforth Memorial Hospital run by the Methodist Episcopal Church beginning in 1901. However, she eventually became disillusioned by the amount of foreign control on the hospital and the liberal theology of the mission. She later severed ties with the mission and, partnering with her sister Dr. Phebe Stone and the former American Methodist Episcopal missionary Jennie V. Hughes, established the Bethel Mission in Shanghai in 1920. Hughes led Bethel Mission's Bible school whereas Shi (Mary Stone) and Phebe Stone led its hospital and nursing school.

While the nurse worked, the Bible woman preached, and in this way hundreds of people heard of Christianity for the first time. As Dr. Stone says, ". . .What we need now is an efficient force of trained evangelistic workers to ... follow up the seed thus sown broadcast on such receptive soil." The Bible school was the basis for small groups, known as "Bethel Bands". The original members of the Shanghai Bethel Band were students from well-known families in Shanghai. One of them was Beatrice Chung, a daughter of a prominent physician, (锺文邦) Dr Harry Chung. Mary Stone and the evangelistic Bethel Bands, reached out to many gatherings, evangelistic meetings and remained witnessing and living by faith from 1920 until the Japanese invasion in 1937.

The student bands, probably modelled after the evangelistic bands used for decades in Japan, were small teams of students or alumni who would conduct revival meetings in churches. They were almost always appealing in having musical talent. Plus they were of neat and tidy appearance, articulate of speech and in preaching, indeed altogether winsome. They were quite popular in churches of all theological orientations.

== Bethel Worldwide Evangelistic Band ==
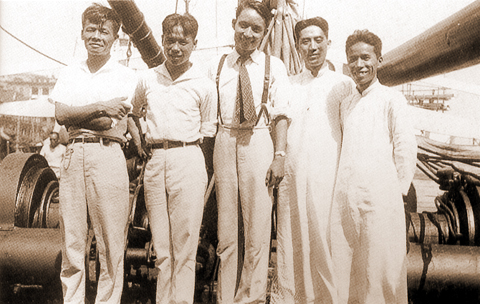
Bethel Worldwide Evangelistic Band

The most famous of the Bethel Bands was the "Bethel Worldwide Evangelistic Band," organized in 1931 by Andrew Gih (also known as Ji Zhiwen) and three other graduates of Bethel: Lincoln Nieh (also known as Nie Zhiying), Li Daorong, and Lin Jingkang. The group would later include the charismatic evangelist John Sung (also known as Song Shangjie). According to the historian Lian Xi, in a single year, the band held over 1,000 meetings, preaching to over 425,000 people in 13 provinces.

== See also ==
- Bethel Bible Seminary
- Bethel High School (Hong Kong)
- Evangelize China Fellowship
