= Bread of Life Pastoral and Missionary Theological Seminary =

Bread of Life Pastoral and Missionary Theological Seminary (Chinese: 靈糧教牧宣教神學院)
- Type: Private, seminary
- Established: 1990
- President: Xie Hongzhong (Chinese: 謝宏忠)
- Location: 4th Floor, No. 205-3, Section 3, Beixin Road, Xindian District, New Taipei City, Republic of China (Taiwan)
- Campus: Business district
- Website: https://llpmts.org/ (in Chinese)

Bread of Life Pastoral and Missionary Theological Seminary, or "Lingliang Pastoral and Missionary Theological Seminary" (LLPMTS), is a Christian seminary in Taiwan, affiliated with the Bread of Life Church. Founded by Pastor Zhou Shenzhu in 1990, the Church now offers bachelor, master and doctoral programs. Its current president is Xie Hongzhong.

== History ==
1990: The Bread of Life Church recognized the need for extensive church planting in Taiwan and the necessity of undertaking the missionary mission. With the consent of the staff, Pastor Zhou Shenzhu of the Church founded the Bread of Life Pastoral and Missionary Theological Seminary, and he became the first president. There were 12 students of the first cohort.

1998: The seminary moved to Bread of Life Villa, Wenshan District, Taipei City. It is a 12-story mission building built by the Church, with a large hall that can accommodate nearly a thousand people.

2005: A branch in Northern Thailand was established.

2011: The programs of Pastoral Counseling and Church Planting were introduced, and the North American branch was established.

2012: The Shilin branch was established.

2015: The campus moved to Xindian District, New Taipei City, where it remains today.

2015: The Central Branch and Southern Branch were established, developed by Tainan Bread of Life Church and Donghai Bread of Life Church respectively.

2018: The Master degree Program in Missions was introduced.

From 1990 to 2025, the Lingliang Church developed from a single church to a global network of 822 churches. Most of the workers who dedicated themselves to the work of planting churches and missionary are alumni of Lingliang Seminary.

== Programs ==
Bread of Life Pastoral and Missionary Theological Seminary offers the following programs:

- Bachelor of Theology
- Master of Missions
- Certificate of Pastoral Counseling
- Master of Pastoral Counseling
- Doctor of Pastoral Counseling
- Master for Working Professionals

Up to 2025, the school has graduated a total of 890 students.

== Campus ==
=== Taiwan Campus ===
The Taiwan campuses of the seminary include.

- Main Campus: Located at 4F, No. 205-3, Section 3, Beixin Road, Xindian District, New Taipei City.
- Shilin Branch: Established in 2012, located at No. 128, Jihe Road, Shilin District, Taipei City (Shilin Lingliang Church).
- Central Branch: Established in 2015, located at No. 243, Fuke Rd., Xitun District, Taichung City (Tainan Donghai Lingliang Church).
- Southern Branch: Established in 2015, located at No. 80, Dawan Rd., Yongkang District, Tainan City (Tainan Lingliang Church Dawan Gospel Center).

=== Overseas Campuses ===
There are several overseas branches.

- Northern Thailand Branch: Established in 2005, located in Chiang Rai Province, Thailand.
- North America Branch: Established in 2012, located in Irvine, California, USA.
- New Zealand Branch: Established in 2019, located in Auckland, New Zealand.
- Australia Branch: Established in 2019, with classrooms in Sydney and Brisbane, Australia.

== Library ==
The school Library is a professional library specializing in Christian theology. Currently, the library holds approximately 30,000 books in both Chinese and Western languages. In addition, there are Chinese and Western periodicals, and related reference books. All materials in this library can be accessed through the library's automated system.

== See also ==
- Bread of Life Church
- List of evangelical seminaries and theological colleges
