= Evangelize China Fellowship =

- Founded: 1947
- Founder: Ji Zhiwen (計志文), aka Andrew Gih
- Location: Monterey Park, California
- Origins: Shanghai, China
- Website: http://www.ecfusa.org

Evangelize China Fellowship
- Traditional Chinese: 基督敎中國佈道會
- Simplified Chinese: 基督敎中国布道会
Transcriptions
Standard Mandarin
- Hanyu Pinyin: Jīdū Jiào Zhōngguó Bùdào Huì

The Evangelize China Fellowship (ECF; Chinese: 基督敎中國佈道會) is an American non-profit 501(c) organization, founded in 1947 by 20th-century Chinese revivalist Andrew Gih. The fellowship consists of churches, missionaries, and affiliated organizations that attempt to bring Christian beliefs to China and persons of Chinese descent.

ECF carries out programs of evangelism, education, and relief work in Hong Kong, Macau, Thailand, Burma, Singapore, Malaysia, Indonesia, Philippines, Vietnam, the United States, People's Republic of China, and Republic of China (Taiwan). Programs are primarily conducted in schools, orphanages, and churches; with the educational programs focused on providing middle- and high-school English teachers training.

== History ==
The ECF founder, Dr. Ji Zhiwen (anglicized as Andrew Gih), was born in Shanghai and became a Christian while a student at Bethel Mission in Shanghai. Moved by the preaching of Paget Wilkes, he became an evangelist at the age of 25. In 1928 he joined the Worldwide Evangelistic Band, led by George Rideout of Asbury College, Wilmore, Kentucky. While on a preaching tour in south China, he met the famed evangelist John Sung (Song Shangjie). They formed the Bethel Worldwide Evangelistic Band in 1931. After Sung left this work in 1933, Gih continued it under the name of Bethel Mission until July 1947, when he founded the Evangelize China Fellowship (ECF) as a Mandarin Church in Shanghai. After Shanghai fell to the Communists, Gih moved his work to Hong Kong, and appointed Paul Shen to open ECF work in Taiwan, resulting eleven years later in seven churches and an orphanage.

In addition to the building of churches, orphanages, and schools; ECF was credited with creating a vast network of Chinese Christians in the Diaspora, and helping Gih attain a level of "notoriety [that] placed him in the company of fellow revivalist J. Edwin Orr and Billy Graham."

In the first 31 years of ECF, the organization opened 375 churches, seven schools, and two seminaries. As of 2007, ECF comprises one-half of the global organization ECF International which conducts charitable and evangelical activities in 18 countries.

== See also ==
- Christianity in China
