= Bethel Seminary (disambiguation) =

- Bethel Bible Seminary, Hong Kong
- Bethel Seminary, Bethel University (Minnesota)
- Bethel Seminary, Stockholm, Sweden
