= T. L. Osborn =

American pastor (1923–2013)

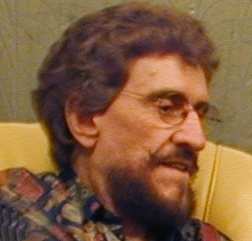
- T. L. Osborn in 2001
- Born: Tommy Lee Osborn; December 23, 1923; Grady County, Oklahoma, U.S.
- Died: February 14, 2013 (aged 89); Tulsa, Oklahoma, U.S.
- Occupations: Evangelist, singer, author, teacher and designer
- Years active: 1949–2013
- Known for: Author of books on Worldwide Miracles-Evangelism and Soul Winning Awakening in the Developing Nations
- Notable work: Healing The Sick
- Television: Good News Daily
- Title: Doctor (honorary)
- Political party: Liberal conservative
- Spouse: Daisy Washburn (m. 1942–1995; her death)
- Children: 2
- Website: www.osborn.org

Tommy Lee "T.L." Osborn (December 23, 1923 – February 14, 2013) was an American Pentecostal televangelist, singer, author and teacher whose Christian ministry was based in Tulsa, Oklahoma. In six decades as a preacher, Osborn hosted the religious television program Good News Today.

== Biography ==
Tommy Lee Osborn was born on December 23, 1923, on the family potato farm, in Grady County, Oklahoma. He was the seventh and youngest son of thirteen children, born to Charles Richard Osborn (1883–1966) and his wife Mary (née Brown) (1885–1951). His father, also a seventh son, was a nonpracticing traditional Baptist, "That's supposed to mean something," Osborn once commented, adding "Turns out, it did mean something." His parents were musicians, as were several of his brothers and sisters, and Tommy Lee started making music at a very young age. Growing up in the latter half of the 1920s, he saw his large family struggling through the depression years. In 1930, when Osborn was six years old, his father moved the family to Skedee, Oklahoma, in search of another, more profitable farm. At a church in Sand Springs, Oklahoma, he met future televangelist Oral Roberts, who would become his lifelong friend for over 70 years, until Roberts's death in 2009. Osborn frequently went with Roberts to help with evangelical meetings. Roberts did most of the preaching, Osborn did everything else, including playing the accordion and the piano for the musical part of the meetings. Osborn had experienced a Christian conversion in 1937, at the age of 13, when his older brother took him to a Pentecostal church in Mannford. Gradually, each of his six brothers moved out of the family home until TL was the only boy still living with his parents and helping his 60-year-old father on the potato farm. He admitted that he was reluctant, even scared, to ask his father's permission to move out and begin traveling. Finally, while sorting potatoes in the cellar, he plucked up courage to make the request and was greatly surprised when his father said "yes."

In 1939, aged 15, Osborn was milking the cows when he began to cry. He fell on his knees, praying and asking God what was happening. The Lord, he said, called him to be an evangelist, while he laughed and cried at the same time, overwhelmed by what was happening to him. He dropped out of high school after completing eighth grade and hit the road with E.M. Dillard, a traveling evangelist. Osborn was responsible for organizing evangelistic meetings and was also in charge of youth services in the evening. He traveled with Dillard through three states. The last one was California, and he met Daisy Washburn, in Los Banos, California at one of the meetings. It was 1941 and he was only 17 when he fell instantly in love.

On April 5, 1942, Osborn married graduating high school student and farmer's girl, Daisy Washburn Osborn (born September 23, 1924 in Merced, California). He was 18, and she was only 17. Shortly thereafter, they set out on a life of ministry and missionary travel, including a trip to India when Osborn was still only 21. In time, they carried the Gospel of Christ to tens of millions of people all over the world, declaring it with faith and confidence. However, that early mission in India, preaching at Lucknow, was not fruitful. Their ministry lasted less than a year in India, and they returned home because of critical family sickness. In 1947, the Osborns had their only daughter, LaDonna Osborn (b. March 13 of that year); she was raised accompanying her parents on the platforms of global mass miracle evangelistic crusades.

The Osborns first gained public notice shortly after returning from India, as evangelists on the Big Tent Revival circuit in the United States and Canada. There, they preached to audiences often numbering over 10,000, in open-air meetings and under large tents in settings such as fairgrounds and stadiums. Other young contemporary evangelists, including Oral Roberts, Billy Graham, Jack Coe, R.W. Schambach and A.A. Allen, were also on the circuit. The Osborns emphasized the love and compassion of God, rather than the "fire and brimstone" theology style commonly used by evangelists of the era, and they practiced supernatural healing in their meetings. The Osborn's egalitarian ministry philosophy was also not accepted by many conservative audiences.

By the early 1950s, their emphasis began to shift more and more toward international missions. They held large crusades in Latin America, Asia, and Africa and crowds grew rapidly, at times exceeding 100,000. After Osborn's crusades in Thailand in 1956 and Uganda in 1957, Pastor Fred Wantaate of Makerere Full Gospel Church said that "after that crusade in Mombasa, the fountain of the river of Pentecostalism spread in the heart of East Africa". Around that same time, he met another future televangelist, Marilyn Hickey, eight years Osborn's junior, with her new husband, Wallace. The young couple traveled around in her husband's car, conducting tent revival meetings in various towns. Together, Osborn and Hickey prayed for the sick and she became a guest speaker at his conferences. He was lifelong friends with her family until his death just four months after Hickey lost her husband, Wallace.

Over the course of the next five decades, Osborn and his team traveled to more than 70 countries including Kenya where Apostle Dr Joe Kayo got born again in his Crusade in 1957(Joe Kayo later turned to be a great pioneer of Pentecostal movement in East Africa) and reached millions of people. They created prolific quantities of evangelistic and training materials, some of which were translated into more than 80 languages.

Osborn's wife of 53 years, Daisy Osborn, died in Tulsa, Oklahoma, on May 27, 1995, at age 70. Thereafter, he continued to travel and conduct crusades around the world for another 15 years. Osborn died on February 14, 2013. According to his daughter, LaDonna, he had been in good health until his body began weakening just a few days before he stopped breathing. He was interred next to his wife at the Memorial Park Cemetery in Tulsa, Oklahoma (the same cemetery where Oral Roberts had been interred nearly four years earlier). Osborn was survived by his daughter, three of four grandchildren and three great-grandchildren.

LaDonna Osborn continues to operate the ministry founded by her parents, including leading international crusades in the developing world every year. His grandson Tommy Ray O'Dell has also followed in his grandfather's footsteps and has a ministry focused on evangelism and education in Asia, Africa, and Europe. Like his grandfather, he often draws large crowds and it has been claimed that miracles have taken place in his services.

== Publications ==
- Healing The Sick (1951)
- Biblical Healing (1954)
- Frontier Evangelism with Miracles of Healing (1955)
- Healing from Christ (1955)
- 3 Keys to the Book of Acts (1960)
- Soulwinning. A Classic on Evangelism (1963)
- The Purpose of Pentecost (1963)
- Outside the Sanctuary. The Case for Soulwinning (1969)
- How to Receive Miracle Healing (1977)
- How to Be Born Again (1977)
- In His Name (1981)
- Faith Speaks (1982)
- One Hundred Divine Healing Facts (1983)
- Receive Miracle Healing (1984)
- You Are God’s Best (1984)
- The Big Love Plan (1984)
- The Gospel According to T. L. & Daisy. Classic Documentary (1985)
- The Best of Life (1986)
- There’s Plenty for You (1986)
- Healing the Sick (1992)
- The Good Life (1994)
- The Power of Positive Desire (1996)
- The Message That Works: What We Have Told Millions in 73 Nations for 53 Years (1997)
- Biblical Healing (2001)
- Miracles: Proof of God's Love (2003)
- If I Were a Woman (2011)
- Legacy of Faith Collection (2011)
- Health Renewed: The Source of Sickness and God's Redemptive Plan (2012)
- Faith’s Testimony” (2012)
