= Gertrude Howe =

American missionary

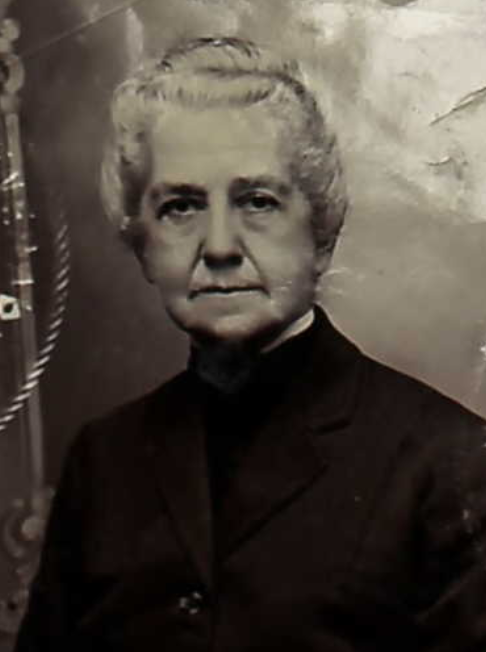
- Gertrude Howe, from her 1916 passport application
- Born: September 13, 1846; Poughkeepsie, New York, U.S.
- Died: December 29, 1928 (aged 82); Nanchang, China
- Occupation: Methodist missionary educator in China
- Relatives: Ida Kahn (adopted daughter)

Gertrude Howe (September 13, 1846 – December 29, 1928) was an American Methodist missionary educator and translator, based in China from 1872 until her death there in 1928.

== Early life and education ==
Howe was born in Poughkeepsie, New York, the daughter of Isaac Howe and Elizabeth Howe. Her family were Quakers and active in abolition work. She attended the Michigan Agricultural College in 1870 and 1871, and the University of Michigan in 1871. She graduated from Michigan State Normal School in 1872.

== Career ==
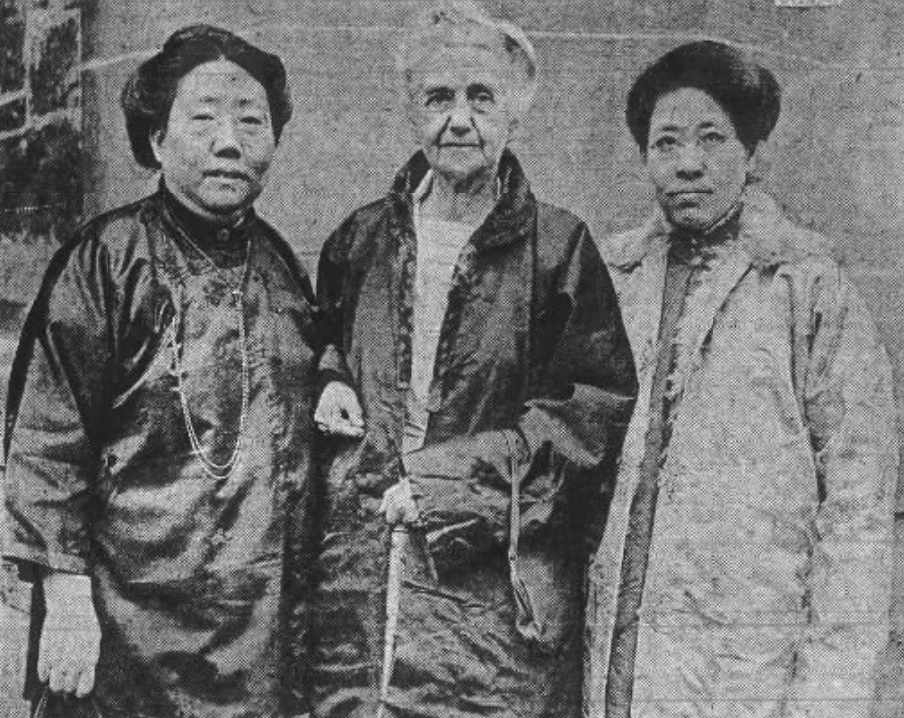
Ida Kahn, Gertrude Howe, and Li Bi Cu at a missionary society meeting in Brookline, Massachusetts in 1919

In her teens, Howe taught school in Lansing, Michigan, and was appointed principal of a primary school when she was 20 years old. In 1872, Howe went to Kiukiang (Jiujiang) in China, as a missionary under the auspices of the Woman's Foreign Missionary Society of the Methodist Episcopal Church. She and medical missionary Lucy H. Hoag founded a girls' high school in 1873, requiring students to have unbound feet to enroll. She adopted and raised four Chinese daughters, including Kang Cheng, known as Ida Kahn. She taught her daughters English, and mentored several other Chinese students who continued their educations in the United States, including Mary Stone, Phebe Stone, and Ilien Tang. She also assisted later women missionaries in China, including Welthy Honsinger Fisher. "While she spared no pains in laying broad educational foundations," according to a biographical pamphlet for church use, "she never lost sight of character-making, to which she gave the prominent place."

Howe moved to Chungking in 1883, and opened another girls' school; but her new school was destroyed within a few years, and she returned to Kiukiang. She translated a Methodist hymnal, and a history of the Reformation, for her students to use. She spoke about her work in the United States during her visits, including in Detroit in 1893, in Pittsburgh in 1909, in Brookline in 1919, and in Lansing in 1920.

Howe's sister, Delia, joined her work in China from 1879 to 1882. Delia Howe became a physician in Detroit.

== Personal life ==
Howe lived in Nanchang with Ida Kahn in her later years. She died there in 1928, after years of declining health, at the age of 82. Kahn wrote an English-language obituary of Howe, listing out her daughters Ida, Julia, Fannie, and Belle, and grandchildren, and detailing the specifics of her funeral.
