= Li Bi Cu =

Chinese female medical doctor

Li Bi Cu (born c. 1881) was a Chinese medical doctor who studied in the United States and established hospitals in China.

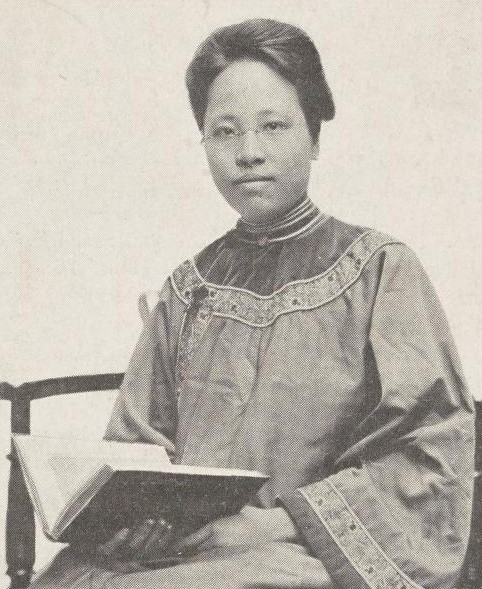
Li Bi Cu

== Personal life ==
Li Bi Cu was born in Putian, China. She had four brothers and one sister. When grown, she married Mr. Li, a Methodist minister. As a young woman, Li Bi Cu was a member of the first Epworth League ever established in China.

Li began studying English in 1897 when she was sixteen years old. She was sent to a mission school in Hongwa and later attended Folts Mission Institute in Herkimer and then the Woman's Medical College of Pennsylvania, in Philadelphia, graduating with high honors in 1905.

In 1915, Li was on a train bound west from Chicago when it struck a laborer, injuring him severely. The man was brought aboard, and when an appeal for a doctor was made, Li offered her services. "Then was seen the strange combination of a Chinese Christian woman caring for an injured Slav in an American baggage car," a Kentucky newspaper observed in 1913. In China, Li gave "much of her time to educating district nurses so they can go into the homes of Chinese mothers and help them in the care of sick children," the paper said.

In May 1912, Li, who was in Delaware for graduate study, was also the first woman lay delegate ever to attend the U.S. Methodist Episcopal General Conference in Minneapolis, representing Fuzhou. Her father, Reverend Li, accompanied her as representative from the Hungwa Conference. Her speech to the conference was reported as advising:

I did not intend to come here to speak because, you know, I am a woman. (Great laughter and applause.) But I do want to leave a message with you all this morning. I think you know that the womanhood of China has been very low for several thousand years, and, therefore, now that the new republic is going to be formed, we want to have the womanhood of China lifted as high as the womanhood of your nation. (Tremendous applause.)

== Profession and career ==
Li became a medical doctor when she graduated from the Woman's Medical College of Philadelphia. After eight years of study, she was the second Chinese woman to graduate in the U.S. as a doctor of medicine. She became head of hospitals in Niucheng Township and Fuzhou.

In summer 1902, she was a nurse in the surgical ward of Rochester Homeopathic Hospital.

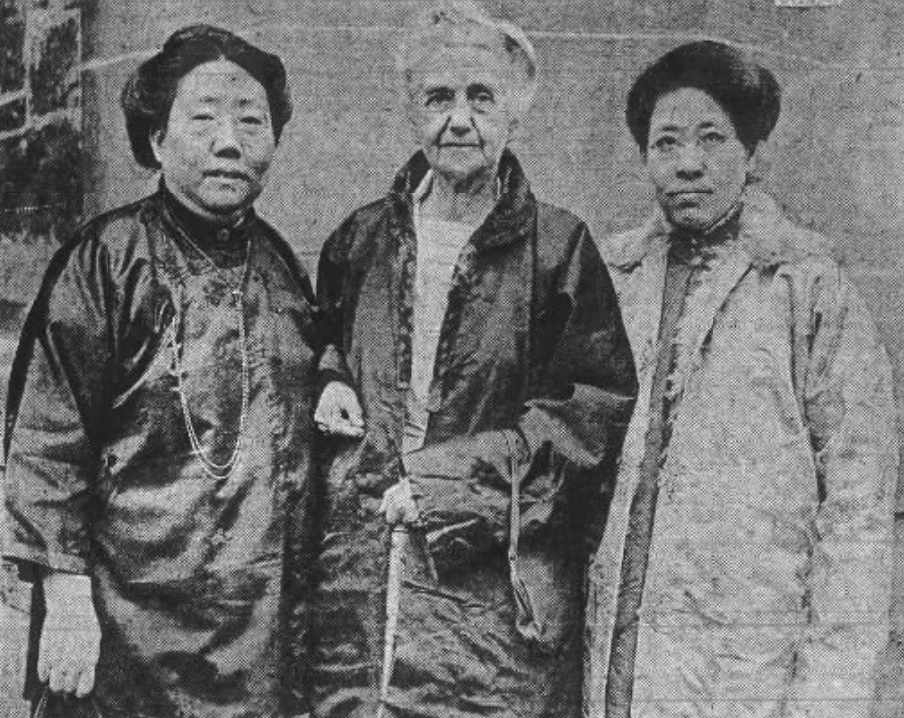
Ida Kahn, Gertrude Howe, and Li Bi Cu, at a Methodist missionaries meeting in Brookline, Massachusetts in 1919.

Before returning to China, Li was received cordially by President Theodore Roosevelt in May 1905 when she called on him to pay her respects. In October she and Miss J. Hughes, her cabinmate, passed through Honolulu, Hawaii, aboard the SS Manchuria on their way to Shanghai.

In Fujian, she began her professional career at Nugeheng, where a hospital was built and furnished by the Woman's Foreign Missionary Society under her supervision; in 1907, it was dedicated for the healing of women and children.

In 1913, she was at Johns Hopkins University, Baltimore. In that year, she was quoted in a newspaper as saying:

Do you know what your English language sounds like to me? It sounds like bird talk. The missionaries used to laugh at me when I told them that, but it is literally true; and even after I learned the language and have been speaking it for years[,] English still reminds me of the mysterious and mutual chirping and chattering of the birds. . . . I think English is beautiful, though difficult to learn; but no matter how much of it I know<,> I cannot get away from my first impression."

A hospital project on which she had been working for so many years was dedicated in December 1927 as the Lucie F. Harrison Memorial Hospital in Fuqing, 35 miles south of Fuzhou, under the auspices of the Women's Foreign Missionary Society of the Methodist Episcopal Church.

Li was a delegate to the World's Health and Social Morality Conference in New York City in 1919.

== Additional reading ==
- Methodist Episcopal Church, Woman's Foreign Missionary Society, 1912, Li Bi Cu, M.D., 1913 (four-page pamphlet with photo of Li)
