= Timothy Dzao =

Timothy Dzao (Chinese: 趙世光; pinyin: Zhao Shiguang; Wade–Giles: Chao^{1} Shih^{1}-kwang^{2}; 1908-1973), also known as Timothy Chao, was a Chinese Protestant evangelist and the founder of the Bread of Life Church (Chinese: 靈糧堂; pinyin: Ling Liang tang).

== Biography ==
Born Dzao Yuanchang (Chinese: 趙元昌), the future evangelist was a descendant of the founder of the Song dynasty, the Emperor Taizu of Song. He discovered Christianity through a cousin and was baptized on Christmas day, 1924. At a revival led by English missionary Paget Wilkes in Shanghai in 1925, he decided to devote his life to evangelism and changed his proper name to Shiguang (Chinese: 世光), literally meaning "World Light." He studied in Shanghai at the Bible college of the Christian and Missionary Alliance. In 1928, he became the pastor of Beulah Chapel (守眞堂), established by the same denomination in Shanghai. In 1932, he was formally ordained as a pastor. He conducted revival tours in several East Asian countries, but this activity was stopped by World War II.

Following what he claimed to be a vision from the Holy Spirit, he founded a small independent missionary body in 1941, which in 1943 evolved into the Bread of Life Church (Chinese: 靈糧堂; pinyin: Ling Liang tang), headquartered in Shanghai. It quickly expanded throughout China and beyond, and in 1946 the Christian World Ling Liang Evangelistic Association was founded. Due to the political situation in China, it moved its headquarters to Hong Kong until 1952, and later to Taiwan. A very promising missionary work in Indonesia and the activity of a Christian university Dzao founded there was also stopped in 1958 by political developments, although it started again after Dzao's death, in 1980.

Dzao eventually became an evangelist of international reputation, conducting revivals throughout Asia, with a special success in South Korea, and even in Germany together with Billy Graham.

Dzao married in 1930 Tang Ling-An and had seven children. He died in 1973, but the Bread of Life Church continued its activities.

Dzao was the founder of Hong Kong’s International Theological College and the author of more than 40 theological and devotional books, some of them translated into English. He was also a renowned musician.
