= Boon Mark Gittisarn =

Thai Pentecostal pastor (1898–1987)

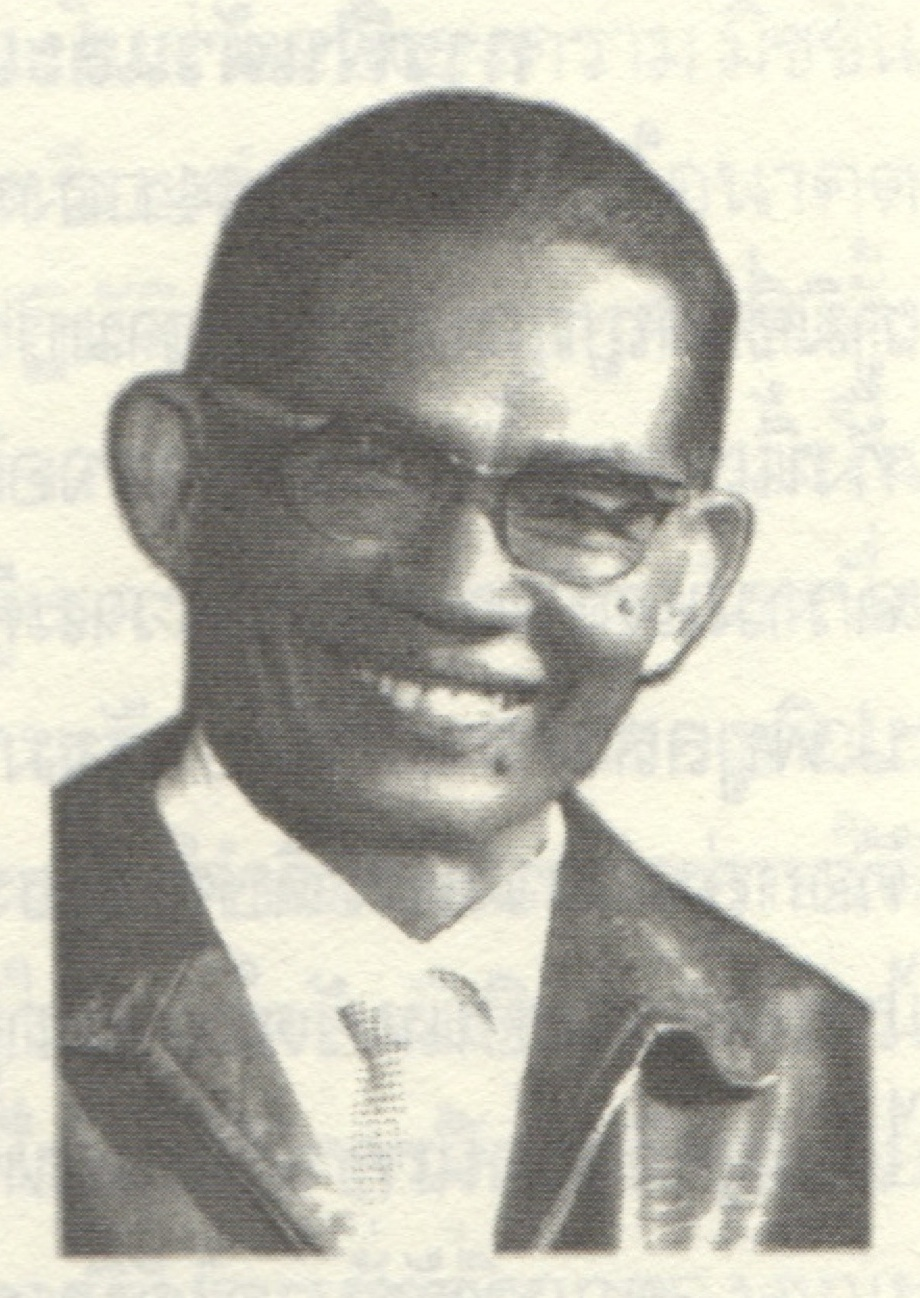
- Born: September 1, 1898; Ratchaburi, Thailand
- Died: 20 May 1987 (aged 88)

Boon Mark Gittisarn (Thai: บุญมาก กิตติสาร; RTGS: Bunmak Kittisan; September 1, 1898 – May 20, 1987) was a 20th-century Thai Protestant pastor and preacher who was influential in introducing Pentecostalism to Thailand.

== Biography ==
=== Birth and Early Education ===
Boon Mark Gittisarn was born on September 1, 1898, in Ratchaburi province in Thailand. In 1921, he completed his secondary education at Bangkok Christian College, where he had made a profession of faith in Jesus Christ.

=== Evangelistic Work ===
Upon completion of his studies, Boon Mark was employed by the American Presbyterian Mission in Siam as an evangelist in Phitsanulok province. In 1930, Boon Mark graduated from McGilvary College of Divinity, which is now a college of Payap University in Chiang Mai. In 1933, he moved to Bangkok and continued working as an evangelist of the American Presbyterian Mission. In April 1934, at the first General Assembly of the newly formed Church of Christ in Thailand [CCT], Boon Mark was elected as assistant secretary. In August 1934, he was ordained to the pastorate of Second Church in Bangkok. In 1938 and 1939, BoonMark served as translator for Chinese evangelist John Sung and became an outspoken supporter of Sung. The Church of Christ in Thailand elected Boon Mark as general secretary in 1938, a position which he held until after World War II. During the war, the Japanese occupation forces prohibited public Christian worship services, and confiscated Christian church buildings, schools, and hospital. Boon Mark traveled widely throughout Thailand at this time, encouraging members of the CCT to endure the difficulties that they were facing.

=== Advocacy for Pentecostalism ===
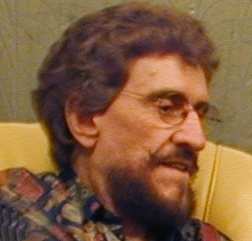
T.L. Osborn

In 1948, Boon Mark withdrew from the Church of Christ in Thailand because he did not agree with the CCT's decision to join the World Council of Churches. He objected to liberal theology and ecumenism which Boon Mark viewed as a compromise of Biblical Christianity. After his departure from the CCT, Boon Mark became associated with Pentecostal missionaries from Finland and became an early advocate for Pentecostalism in Thailand. Boon Mark played an important role in the 1956 Bangkok crusade meetings of American Pentecostal healing evangelist T.L. Osborn, for whom he translated during the meetings. Boon Mark later associated himself with the United Pentecostal Church (UPC), a group whom he met on a visit to the United States. From the UPC church denomination, Boon Mark learned of the "Jesus Only" teaching, which maintains that Christians should be baptized only in the name of Jesus, not in the name of God the Father or the Holy Spirit. When Boon Mark brought the "Jesus Only" teaching back to Thailand and began teaching it in Thai Pentecostal churches, some people agreed with him, while others did not. The division caused a split within the Pentecostal churches in Thailand. The United Pentecostal Church initially experienced rapid growth in Thailand, but then experienced rapid decline after Boon Mark withdrew from the group in the late 1960s.

=== Founding of Thailand's first independent church ===
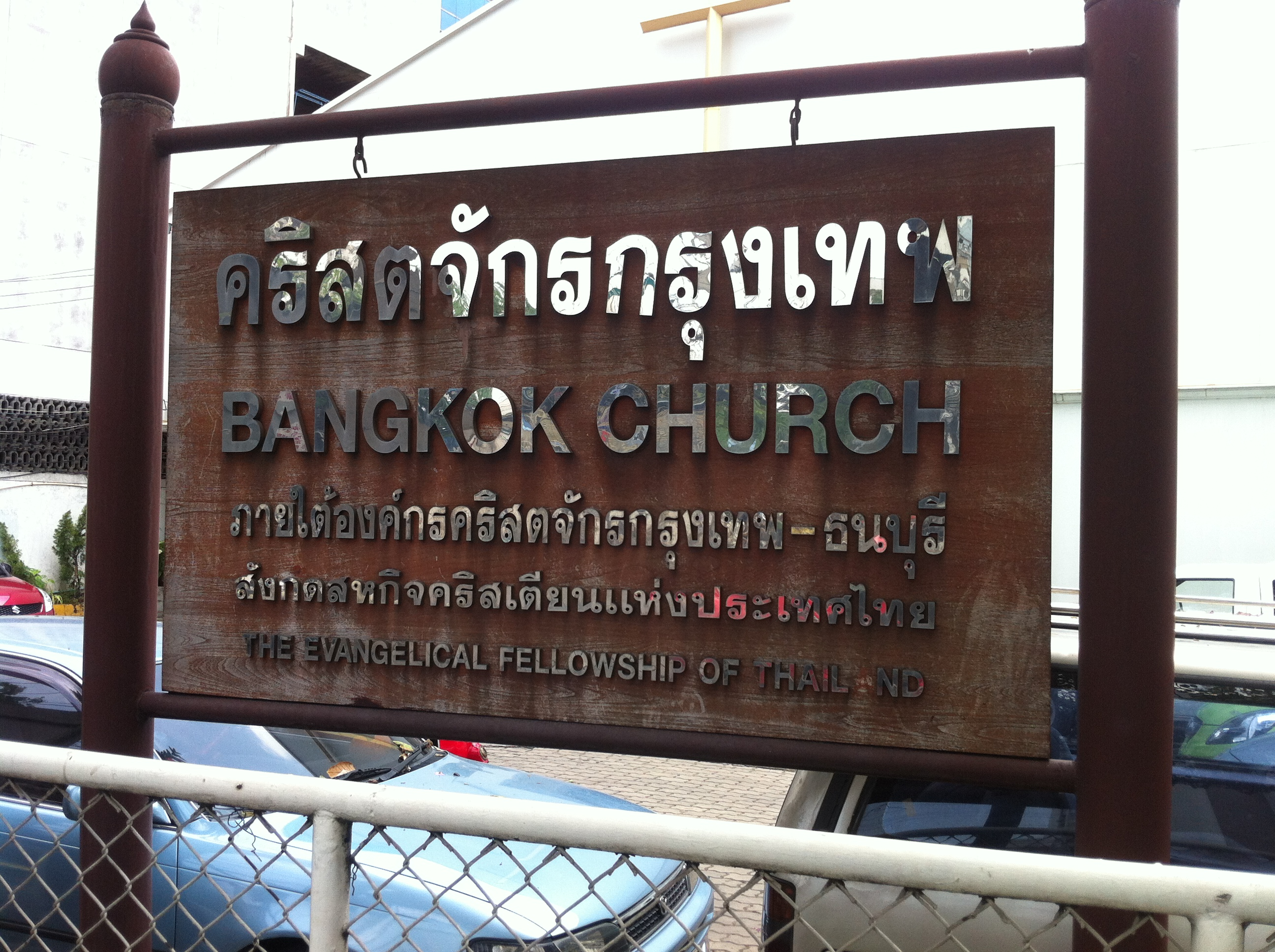
Bangkok Church

In 1957, Boon Mark founded Bangkok Church, the first independent church in Thailand. He also founded the Association of Independent Churches in Thailand, of which he served as general secretary.

=== Death ===
Boon Mark Gittisarn died on May 20, 1987.
