= Andrew Gih =

Chinese Christian evangelical leader (1901–1985)

Rev. Andrew Gih
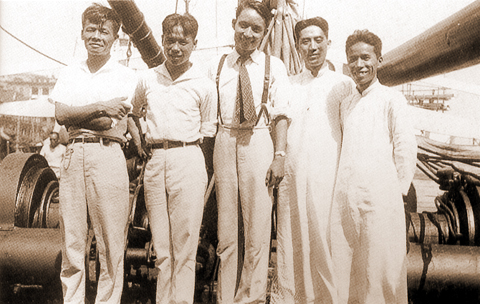
- The Bethel Evangelistic Band: Andrew Gih is second from the right. Leftmost is John Sung.
- Born: Chi Chih-wen; January 10, 1901; Shanghai, Qing China
- Died: February 13, 1985 (aged 84); Los Angeles, California, U.S.
- Occupation: Evangelist

Andrew Gih or Ji Zhiwen (traditional Chinese: 計志文; simplified Chinese: 计志文; pinyin: Jì Zhìwén; Wade–Giles: Chi Chih-wên; January 10, 1901 – February 13, 1985) was a Chinese Protestant evangelist who cofounded the Bethel Worldwide Evangelistic Band in the early 1920s with Leland Wang, and founded the Evangelize China Fellowship in 1947, both initially based in Shanghai. The Bethel Evangelistic Band, a significant Christian movement in 1920s China, played a crucial role in spreading the faith, with Beatrice Chung as one of its prominent members. After the political situation worsened in China due to the communist revolution, he and his wife Dorcas Zhang would move to Hong Kong and eventually retire at the Los Angeles headquarters of Evangelize China Fellowship in 1978.

== Biography ==
Andrew Gih was born in Shanghai. His father was a Confucian scholar who offered Gih a traditional Confucian education, and his mother was a Buddhist who practiced Chinese folk religions. He would attend a China Inland Mission middle school when he was 18 to learn English, but was introduced to Christianity and was eventually baptized as a Christian.

After gaining an interest in evangelistic activities under the influence of the preaching of Paget Wilkes, Gih was initially associated with the Bethel Mission in Shanghai, founded by the Chinese medical doctor, Mary Stone, and the American missionary, Jennie Hughes. Gih, together with John Sung and three other men from the Bethel Mission, would establish the Bethel Worldwide Evangelistic Band in 1931 in Shanghai. Between 1931 and 1935, their band reportedly traveled over 50,000 miles, visited 133 cities, held nearly 3,400 revival meetings throughout China, and saw an estimated 50,000 Christian converts.

In 1933, Sung left the movement, and Gih continued it by using again the name Bethel Mission until 1947, when he founded the Evangelize China Fellowship (ECF) and the Mandarin Church in Shanghai. After the Communist victory in China's civil war, he moved to Hong Kong, and asked his co-worker Paul Shen to establish ECF in Taiwan, where he also opened an orphanage. Despite his short stay in Hong Kong until 1951, his revivalist message has impacted his followers to create independent denominational churches in Hong Kong.

Andrew Gih would become well known as an evangelist in mainland China and amongst overseas Chinese communities. In 1950, he received an honorary doctorate from Oregon Bible Seminary in the United States and, in the next year, he began an evangelistic tour in Southeast Asia, traveling to the Philippines, Indonesia, Singapore, and Malaysia.

Throughout his years, Gih would establish a number of orphanages, primary and secondary schools, and bible colleges. One of them is Southeast Asia Bible College in Bandung, Indonesia, later renamed Southeast Asia Bible Seminary and moved to Malang.

He would eventually retire in 1978 and move to the Los Angeles headquarters of the Chinese Evangelization Society. However, after suffering from tuberculosis and lung cancer, Andrew Gih died on February 13, 1985. During his lifetime, the ECF has grown to include 375 churches, two seminaries and seven schools in seven Asian countries in addition to the United States.

== Bibliography ==
- Ji, Zhiwen (1975). Wushi nianlai shi feng Zhu [Serving the Lord for Fifty Years] (in Chinese). Hong Kong: Sheng Dao Chubanshe.

== See also ==
- Mary Stone (Shi Meiyu, 1873–1954)
- John Sung (Song Shangjie, 1901–1944)
