= Paget Wilkes =

English Christian evangelical missionary

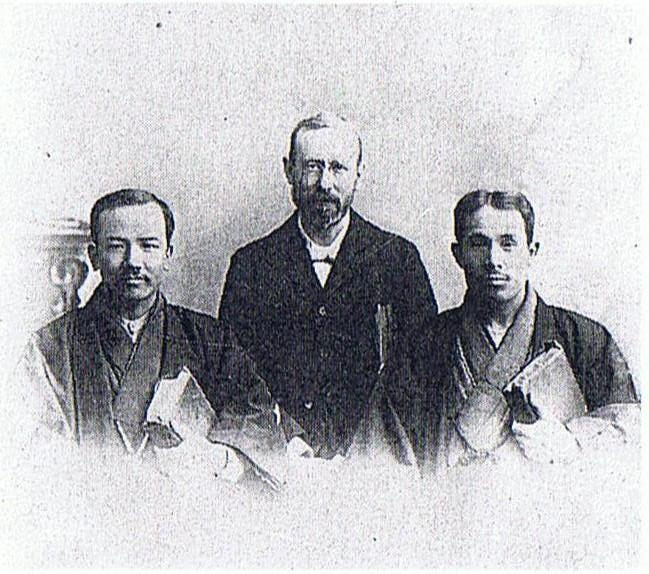
NAKADA Juji, Paget Wilkes, MITANI Tanekiti,1902

Alpheus Paget Wilkes (19 January 1871 – 5 October 1934) was an English evangelical Christian missionary to Japan who was one of the founders of the Japan Evangelistic Band in 1903. In addition to extensive mission work in Japan, and touring South East Asia, he wrote a number of penetrating expositions of Christian scriptures.

== Early life ==
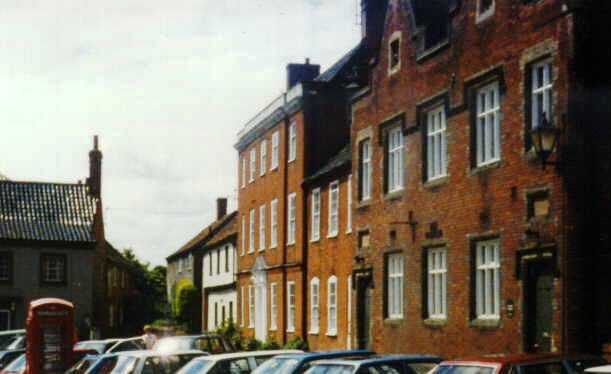
Walsingham Grammar School buildings

Wilkes was born at Titchwell, Norfolk, the second son of the Rev. Alpheus Wilkes and his wife Mary Davies. He was and brought up in Little Walsingham where his father, an austere evangelical from Yorkshire, was headmaster of the Grammar School and also vicar of West Barsham. His mother was the daughter of Henry Davies, bookseller, publisher and newspaper editor of Cheltenham. She was vivacious and nicknamed "y Deryn" for her lovely singing voice, while Wilkes was heavy and serious, a contrast that was too marked to make for harmony. Paget Wilkes and his elder brother Lewis were initially taught at home in an environment of strict simplicity and discipline. Few pleasures were permitted, and little variety came into their lives. Their mother died when Paget was thirteen and following the remarriage of his father in 1886, the family home became a centre for highly religious spinsters. Wilkes went to Bedford School and Lincoln College, Oxford. Inspired by a meeting led by Frederick Brotherton Meyer, he became a devoted Christian and during his three years at Oxford he spent part of his vacations in Christian work helping in the work of the Children's Special Service Mission. There was a strong Christian zeal at Oxford at the time, and in those ten years 60 missionaries went from Oxford. Wilkes was particularly inspired by Richard Reader Harris and his Pentecostal League.

== Mission work ==
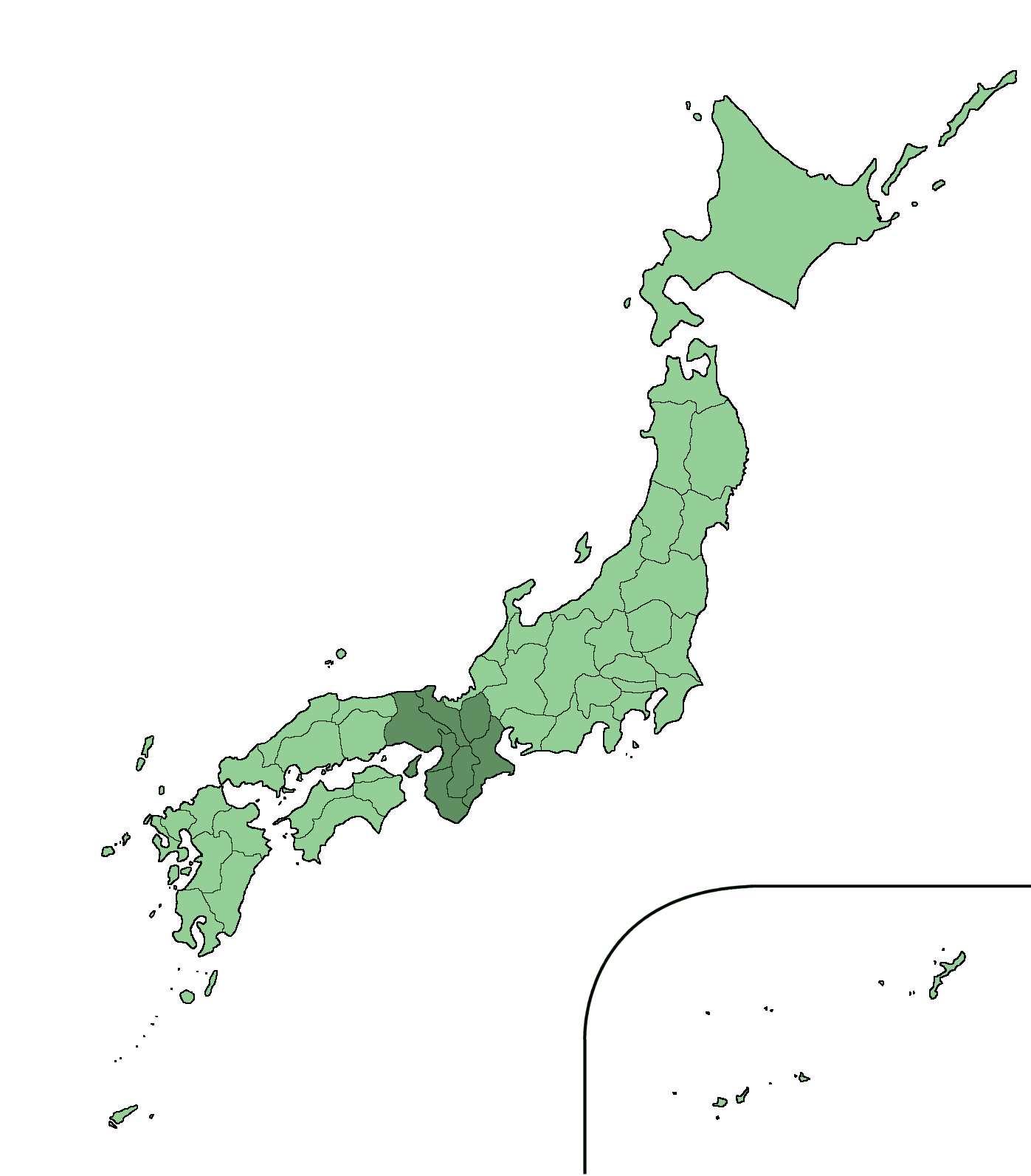
Japan, with the Kansai region containing Kobe highlighted

In 1898 Wilkes began his mission work in Japan at Matsue and Osaka on the invitation of Barclay Buxton, who first went to Japan in 1890. They returned to England in 1902. In 1903 at the Keswick Convention, Wilkes and Buxton founded the Japan Evangelistic Band (or JEB). The Band was devoted to aggressive evangelism and personal holiness. The work of the JEB, now known as JCL, has led to the establishment of the Kansai Bible College in Kobe and over 150 churches in Japan.

Over the next 20 years Wilkes and his wife spent their time alternating between England and Japan where he was based at Kobe. In 1907 the Japanese climate was affecting their son's health and he needed to go to school in England, so Mrs Wilkes returned to England and the following year Paget followed them back and stayed in England for 18 months.

In April 1910, Wilkes returned to Japan on a tour described in his "Missionary Joys in Japan". He travelled via Moscow and the Trans-Siberian Railway and reported floods at Karuizawa, the convention at Arima Onsen and a tour which included Kōfu, Yamanashi Nagasaki, Fukuoka and Nakatsu. In 1911 he visited Korea and made a tour in the north of Japan taking in Morioka. He returned to England in June 1912.

The Wilkes were back in Kobe at the beginning of 1913 and returned to England on 1915, to be with their son. Wilkes went back to Japan on his own in 1918 via North America through New York City and San Francisco. His son was at the Front in Flanders and Wilkes received cables, one saying he had been gassed and was in hospital in Liverpool and another later one that he had been captured at the Front and sent to Germany.

After returning to England, Wilkes went back to Japan in August 1923 and in July 1925 landed at Shanghai on a mission to China. It was there that he inspired Dr. Ji Zhiwen (计志文, anglicised as Andrew Gih), the founder of the Evangelize China Fellowship, and Zhao Shiguang, the founder of the Bread of Life church. In 1926 Wilkes and his wife were back in England and then visited his sister Mary Dunn Pattison, then leading a Christian group at Chalet Point du Jour near Geneva. After visiting South Africa in the spring of 1927 for six months, Wilkes revisited Switzerland in Autumn 1927. He was particularly active, travelling over 4,000 miles and holding 220 meetings, and as a result his health was impaired. He left England in February 1928 but was taken ill on arrival in Canada. So he returned to England and then Switzerland where he stayed at the Spiritual centre at Vennes. His activity was much reduced but he still revisited Japan for the last time in 1930.

== Writing ==
Wilkes produced a number of significant expositions of the scripture including the "Dynamic" series, "Salvation" and "Sanctification". R. A. Torrey said that if he could put only one other book besides the Bible into the hands of his students it would be The Dynamic of Service by Paget Wilkes. Wilkes also wrote poetry and hymns and translated many Japanese poems into English.

== Personal life ==
Paget Wilkes married Gertrude Hamilton Barthorp who supported him in loyally his work. Their son Arthur Hamilton Paget Wilkes became a missionary in Africa, RAF Chaplain and Anglican vicar. Their grandson Michael Paget-Wilkes became Archdeacon of Warwick. Paget Wilkes' brother Lewis Vaughan Wilkes founded and ran St Cyprian's School, Eastbourne, a very influential prep school.

== Selected publications ==
- Missionary Joys in Japan (1913)
- The Dynamic of Faith (1916)
- The Dynamic of Service (1924)
- The Dynamic of Redemption (1924)
- Salvation (1928)
- Modern Thought (1929)
- The Dynamic of Life (1931)
- Sanctification (1931)
