= John Sung =

Chinese evangelist

Rev. John Sung
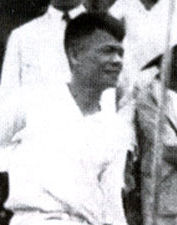
- Rev. John Sung after his first Singapore visit in 1935, about to sail for Shanghai
- Born: Sung Shang-chieh; September 27, 1901; Hinghwa, Fujian, Qing China
- Died: August 18, 1944 (aged 42); Beijing, Republican China
- Education: Ph.D. in chemistry
- Alma mater: Ohio State University
- Occupation: Evangelist
- Spouse: Yu Jinhua
- Children: 5

John Sung Shang Chieh
- Traditional Chinese: 宋尙節
- Simplified Chinese: 宋尚节
Transcriptions
Standard Mandarin
- Hanyu Pinyin: Sòng Shàngjié
- Wade–Giles: Sung Shang-chieh

John Sung Shang Chieh (Chinese: 宋尙節, 27 September 1901 – 18 August 1944) also John Sung, was a renowned Chinese Christian evangelist who played an instrumental role in the revival movement among the Chinese in mainland China, Taiwan, and Southeast Asia during the 1920s and 1930s.

== Career ==
John Sung was born in Hinghwa (now Putian), Fujian, China.

He grew up with a Christian upbringing. His father was a pastor of the local American Wesleyan Methodist Church. Sung also helped his father in church duties. On certain evenings when his father was either too busy or was too ill, Sung would have to lead the sermons as a substitute instead. Because of his early contributions to the church work, many church members referred to him as "Little Pastor". On April 9, 1909, the nine-year-old Sung witnessed an "unprecedented revival" during a Good Friday sermon preached by Pastor Lim Hongban in Hinghwa which left a lasting impression.

However, Sung had to go through a few years of testing before he was widely recognized as a prominent evangelist. In 1920, he was sent to America to pursue his higher education. He studied at Ohio Wesleyan University and Ohio State University. He was a brilliant student who earned a doctorate in chemistry in five years. His chemistry essays and research documents can still be seen in the university library today.

Despite the array of career opportunities in front of him, Sung believed that he was called by God to commit himself to work for Jesus Christ. In 1926 he went to Union Theological Seminary in New York City for theological studies.

== Transformation ==
With his advanced degrees, he was able to secure full tuition and a $400 annual living allowance. Union Theological Seminary prided itself on a "progressive outlook." Its professors publicly called for Christian unity, lobbied for international peace and discouraged the use of "imperialist force" in the various crises that were occurring worldwide. Among the lecturers was Harry Emerson Fosdick, who challenged traditional Christian beliefs such as the bodily resurrection of Christ. While still at the seminary, Sung set aside much of his Christian faith and chanted Buddhist sutras, studied mysticism, investigated the theosophic societies and other sects that were found in New York. He translated Laozi's Tao Te Ching into English and pondered if Laozi's teachings might be for him. Sung later wrote, "My soul wandered in a wilderness." During Christmas break in 1926, Sung attended an evangelistic meeting with fellow students and unexpectedly saw fifteen-year-old evangelist Uldine Utley give the presentation. Feeling Utley had awakened something within his soul, Sung returned four more times to hear her preach. "Even I, a proud man, was moved by her," said Sung. The Gospel message of Jesus Christ was delivered clearly and persuasively. Sung was determined to discover for himself the power that motivated the young evangelist.

As later recounted by Sung, on 10 February 1927, during a time of prayer, he was baptized in the Holy Spirit. He continued, "This was my spiritual birthday! Although I already believed in Jesus since my early childhood days, this new experience is a life changing one for me." John Sung described that "The Holy Spirit poured onto me, just like water, on top of my head", then "The Holy Spirit continuously poured onto me wave after wave".

It was then that he claimed to have been born again. "At first it seemed that there was no way to get rid of [his sins] and that he must go to Hell… He turned to the story of the cross in Gospel of Luke 23, and as he read the story came alive. So vivid was the sight of the Savior dying for his sins that he seemed to be there at the foot of the Cross and pleading to be washed from all his sins in the precious Blood… Then he heard a voice saying, 'Son, thy sins are forgiven.'"

After this experience John Sung now felt that he possessed more strength and enthusiastically preached the Gospel to people he met. John became a radically changed man and began to preach fervently to his peers and lecturers in the seminary. It was such a drastic change in the man that his fellow liberal theology students reckoned that he had gone out of his right mind, and the seminary authorities confined him in an insane asylum, where he stayed for 193 days.

Despite this period of isolation, John Sung set himself to read the Bible. It was during this stay that he read through the entire Bible 40 times and soon became very familiar and well versed in its teachings. This period of Scriptural reading and spiritual renewal laid the foundations for one of the major revivals of the 20th century.

== Return to China and gospel ministry ==
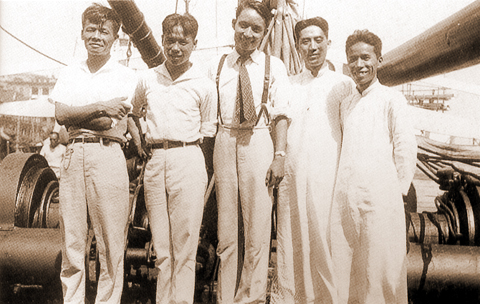
Bethel Worldwide Evangelistic Band, with John Sung on the left, Andrew Gih the second from right

The Chinese Consulate managed to arrange for Sung's release and he returned to China in November 1927, without graduating from Union Theological Seminary. Before stepping on Chinese soil after an almost eight-year absence, he threw all his academic awards into the sea, only keeping the doctorate diploma for his father. This action he intended to signify his full commitment to the Gospel.

After his return to China, he began preaching in the Min-nan region for three years. His main topics at that time were "The Crucifix " and "The Blood of Jesus". His messages were based on Bible teachings concerning spiritual rebirth, salvation, and bearing a cross.

In 1930 or 1931, he joined Bethel Bible School in Shanghai, where, with Andrew Gih and three other graduates, he formed a Bethel Worldwide Evangelistic Band in 1931. The topic of his sermons were now mainly about how to deal with sin. A summary of his teaching during this period was that people admitting their sins is not enough, they must "repent of their sins" and after repentance should come a time to "Correct your sins". He went on to say that after one has changed sinful habits comes a time to "Repay your sins".

Sung also believed that by saying "Lord, forgive me for I am a sinner" is insufficient. He emphasized that during prayers, repentance should be made as a whole group and done step by step in minor detail. In fact, Sung listed twenty major categories of sins and if one had committed one of those sins listed within a category then one must admit and repent of that sin during a group prayer session.

Sung was sometimes so excited that he often jumped onto the pulpit to preach; in the middle of the sermon he would always sing a hymn for up to twenty or thirty minutes. John Sung also made use of props during sermons. On one occasion during a sermon, he brought a coffin, placed it under the pulpit, and shouted, "Get rich, get rich, get the coffin!". (This was a play on words in the original Chinese, used to convey the idea that pursuing money will not bring you eternal life.) After exclaiming this statement, he then went and lay down in the coffin himself.

Sung proved to be a zealous and compelling preacher. His name spread throughout China and invitations soon poured in, requesting him to spread the gospel to other regions as well. By 1936, it was believed more than 100,000 Chinese were converted through his ministry. His missionary work spread beyond China and he was actively preaching to overseas Chinese population in Southeast Asia.

Sung preached revival meetings in Thailand during 1938 and 1939. He spoke at both Chinese churches (mostly in Bangkok), and at many Thai churches nationwide, from Trang province in the south to Prae province in the north. Thai church leaders Suk Phongnoi and Boon Mark Gittisarn served as Sung's translators at different times during his evangelistic tours in Thailand. Sung's preaching in Thailand resulted in nominal Christians returning to the faith and non-Christians becoming born again.

Sung's Bible messages were focused on the need for repentance. He took the issue of sin very seriously and often invited his audience to repent to a list of specific sins that he read out. He spoke out against sin and hypocrisy, even at the ministers and pastoral staffs who were with him at the meetings. As such, he often offended many. His sermons regularly moved his audience to tears with the message of Christ's love.

Sung was a man of prayer. He actively compiled a list of prayer requests given by fellow Christians and would spend many hours praying for them.

Sung read only the Bible and a daily newspaper.

His preaching ministry meant that he was away from his wife and children for very long periods.

Sung was quoted as defining faith as "watching God work while on your knees".

== Last years and legacy ==
Towards the last years of his life, intestinal tuberculosis plagued him and deeply affected his work. Despite this, he continued to preach and even had to speak in a leaning position to lessen the pain. He succumbed to the disease at the age of 42. It is claimed that John Sung was the most influential Chinese evangelist during the 1930s and his ministry had a profound impact on Christianity, especially in the Chinese-speaking world in China and Southeast Asia. He also helped found the Church Assembly Hall along with Watchman Nee and others. Countless Chinese were converted and revived through his ministry and they would play a significant role in the growth of Christianity in the region.

A confession from a woman in Indonesia when John Sung entered the church from the door, sick people nearby suddenly healed as he walked forward to the altar. It happened in a service in the Portugeesch buitenkerk (known today as Gereja Sion) in Jakarta, Indonesia, in the 1930s (it was Batavia, Dutch Indies, on that time). There were numerous reports of other apparently miraculous healings taking place in various areas under Sung's ministry. The blind were made to see, the lame walked, dumb people recovered their speech, and many kinds of sickness were removed. However, there were a "large percentage of sufferers who derived no benefit at all."

== See also ==
- Chinese Independent Churches
- Protestant missions in China 1807-1953
- Andrew Gih
- Watchman Nee
- Ming-Dao Wang

== Bibliography ==
- Lim, Ka-Tong. The Life and Ministry of John Sung, Armour Publishing, Singapore, 2011.
- Lim, Ka-Tong. "The Life and Ministry of John Sung: Sowing Seeds of Vibrant Christianity in Asian Soil." Ph.D. Dissertation, Asbury Theological Seminary, 2009.
- Lyall, Lesile T. A Biography of John Song. London: China Inland Mission, 1954.
- Smithers, Dave John Sung - Apostle of Revival, retrieved from:
- Sng, Bobby E.K. In His Good Time: The Story of the Church in Singapore 1819–2002, (3rd ed.), Singapore Bible Society, Singapore 2003, pp. 172–179.
- Tow, Timothy John Sung – My Teacher, Christian Life Publishers, Singapore 1985.
