= Ida Kahn =

Chinese doctor (1873–1931)

- Kang Cheng
- Born: 6 December 1873; Kiukiang (Jiujiang), Qing Dynasty
- Died: 9 November 1931 (aged 57); Shanghai, Republic of China
- Other name: Kang Cheng (Chinese: 康成)
- Education: University of Michigan, Ann Arbor (MD); Northwestern University (BA)

Ida Kahn (simplified Chinese: 康爱德; traditional Chinese: 康愛德; December 6, 1873—November 9, 1931), born Kang Cheng (Chinese: 康成), was a Chinese medical doctor who, along with Mary Stone, operated dispensaries and hospitals in China from the late nineteenth to the early twentieth century. Kahn was most known for expanding the presence of Chinese women in the workforce. This work, along with that of her colleague Mary Stone, established the first corps of Chinese women medical professionals.

== Early life ==
Ida Kahn was born on December 6, 1873, in Jiujiang, Jiangxi, China, the sixth girl in the family. After her parents failed to betroth her, they became convinced by an "unfavorable horoscope" that she was bad luck. Consequently, Kahn's father gave her up for adoption, and his employer, Gertrude Howe, adopted her and renamed her Ida Kahn.

Howe was a member of the Women's Foreign Missionary Society (WFMS), the women's board of the Methodist Episcopal Church; an organization that Kahn would keep close ties with as she pursued her missionary work. From a young age, Kahn learned English, and worked as a translator for foreign doctors. Due to her adoptive mother's faith, Kahn grew up Christian, an element that became a defining characteristic of her missionary work. Kahn remained active within the WFMS, and drew upon the organization for financial support of her hospital and dispensaries.

== Education ==
At the age of nineteen, Kahn, along with Mary Stone, was brought to the U.S. to obtain a degree in medicine, which was sponsored by the Methodist Episcopal Church. They started at the University of Michigan, Ann Arbor Medical School in 1892, and graduated with honors four years later. While there, she also did Christian work with her church.

Kahn took a short break from her work in Nanchang, and went back to the United States between 1909 and 1911 to receive a Bachelor's degree in English literature from Northwestern University. She also pursued postgraduate work in London.

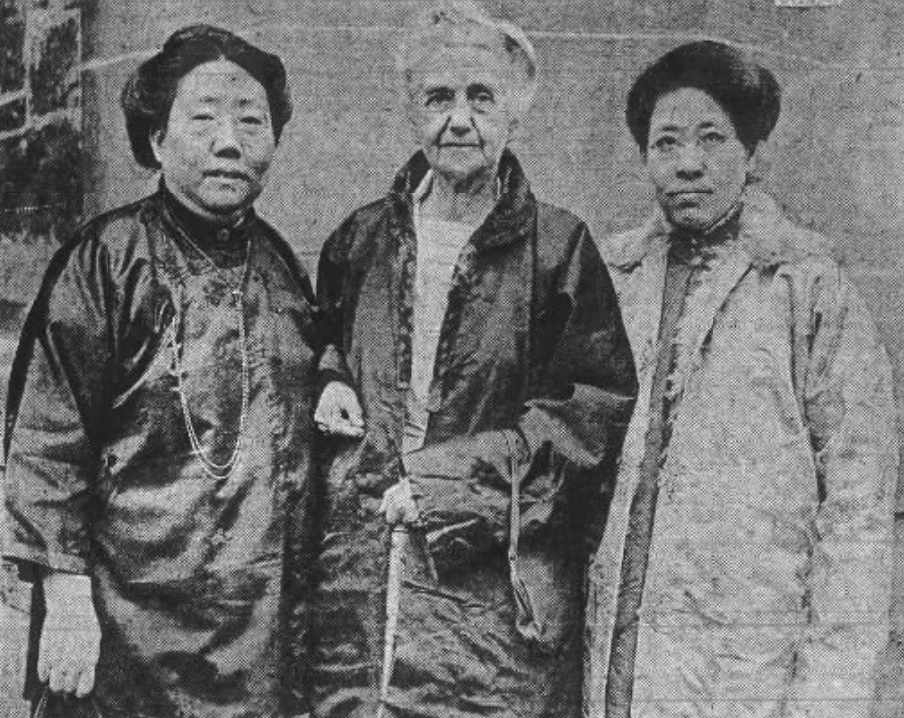
Ida Kahn, Gertrude Howe, and Li Bi Cu, at a 1919 meeting of Methodist missionaries in Brookline, Massachusetts.

== Personal life ==
Aside from her, Gertrude Howe also adopted three other girls, Fannie, Julia, and Belle. Kahn never married, though some of her adoptive family did.

== Missionary service ==
=== Work in Jiujiang ===
Kahn returned to China following her graduation from University of Michigan, Ann Arbor School of Medicine in 1896 and opened a dispensary along with Mary Stone in Jiujiang. After curing the wife of a notable Nanchang official, wealthy women—dubbed "Tai Tai"—started traveling from Nanchang to Jiujiang just to receive medical consultation from Kahn. These women were instrumental in increasing the revenue and notoriety of Kahn and Stone in their first few years of medical work, as there was a marked increase over the next few years in the number of patients they received. In 1904, Kahn saw 6,112 patients, and in 1905 she saw 5,907 patients.

After about four years of successful work, the Boxer Rebellion disrupted Kahn and Stone's work in Jiujiang. The persecution of Chinese Christians made it an unsafe environment for Kahn and Stone to work in. Though Kahn wanted to stay, it eventually became too dangerous; she then went to Japan to seek refuge.

=== Work in Nanchang ===
After returning to China, Kahn was called by government officials to open a hospital in Nanchang. The officials gave Kahn the land for the hospital, but would only give her full support for the hospital if she refrained from making it Christian. Kahn refused to bend her faith, and as thus, had to fundraise the funds needed for the hospital on her own. The people of Nanchang, along with the WFMS, eventually contributed to money to get the hospital a rented building. With $10,000 donated by Kahn's American friends and sponsorship by the Methodist Episcopal Church, Kahn was able to build the Nanchang Women and Children's Hospital—later renamed the Ida Kahn Hospital in her honor. As a result of the political instability of China during that time period, it was not always peaceful at the hospital; frequently, military officers ran her hospital, and at times, even occupied her home.

By the time she returned to China from Northwestern, the Revolution of 1911 had completely disrupted the existing political order. Kahn sheltered some of the most distinguished political officials of the province, proving her status and influence in China. Among those refugees were "the literacy chancellor, the provincial judge, and the family of the provincial salt commissioners, both the retired and the entering men."

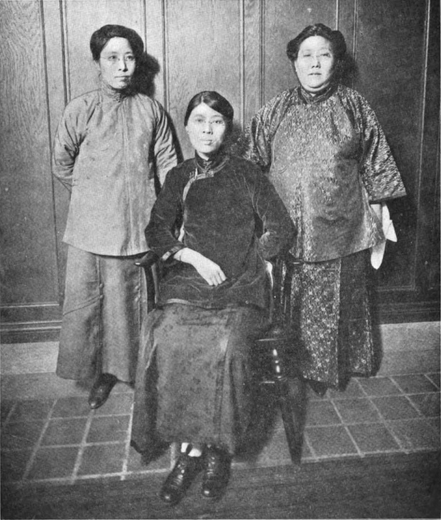
Dr. Li Bi Leu, Dr. Dau Se Zals, Dr. Ida Kahn (l-r) at the International Conference of Medical Women (1919)

From March 1912, when some stability had come to China, to her death in 1931, Kahn worked in the hospital providing care to patients of all socioeconomic backgrounds. Kahn had clientele from among the highest families and government circles within China, and counted among her patients the family of the governor. In fact, she used her connections as a doctor to important political figures to develop popular support for the health of women and children within the province.

=== Illnesses and conditions treated ===
Kahn worked mostly with women and children's health, and a lot of the medical work and medical training she did centered around that area. Kahn performed many Caesarean sections on her own and often shared stories of dramatic childbirth cases, but she also dealt with other illnesses as well, especially a type of infection known as carbuncles. Carbuncles were common in those with a weakened immune system, especially those who suffered from malnutrition and occurred most with the Nanchang poor.

== Shanghai exploration and death ==
Kahn had been actively working out of Nanchang, when she finally relented to the missionaries asking her to visit a sanatorium in Shanghai in late 1931. Kahn, at this point, was battling stomach cancer, and died shortly after arriving, on December 9, 1931.

== Hospital legacy ==
After Kahn's death, Huang Yanyu (Alice Huang), a doctor who graduated from the Woman's Medical College of Pennsylvania and had previously worked with Kahn, took over the hospital. The hospital remained a hospital for women until the outbreak of the Second Sino-Japanese War caused both the WFMS and the General Hospital to evacuate to an area in Jiangxi safe from Japanese control, where Huang worked in a refugee camp.

Kahn's hospital merged with another hospital named the General Hospital in 1949, when they both relocated to Nanchang. After the Chinese Communist Revolution, foreign missionaries left China over the next few years. Kang's Hospital ended up becoming a predecessor of the Jiangxi Gynecological Hospital.

== Ideological and physical contributions ==
Prior to Ida Kahn and Mary Stone, Chinese women in the medical field were unheard of, those practicing Western medicine in particular. As one of the first in her field, Kahn's vision for the future of Chinese women in medicine in China was especially novel and important.

Ida Kahn was a huge proponent of "self-supporting" medical work, where she believed that China could provide for itself. To this end, Kahn, along with her colleague, Mary Stone, trained a "Chinese corps" of nurses, which would help in building a strong "new China." Her ideals reflect a blending of Western and Eastern cultures: she mixed classic Chinese gender roles with separate "healing spheres" with Western self-reliance to create self-support. Her 1921 report, where she stressed "By Chinese Women for Chinese Women," affirms this ideology. Kahn's goal was for a corps of Chinese women professionals extended beyond its rhetorical value. She fought to keep raising the standards of her nursing school, and graduated about three to four nurses each year, following the guidelines of the Nurses Association of China; in 1930, she graduated a class of ten. Kahn also made sure to give the nurses and the physicians that helped in her hospital and nursing school a chance to study in the United States; she often wrote to her American physician friends to help her secure them postgraduate training opportunities.

Kahn's annual reports confronted important social, religious, and political issues. Her writing challenged then common views of Chinese women as victims in need of rescue. She sought for China to be a place where its women could serve the nation in a good way, while simultaneously presenting a view of where they were saviors rather than victims in the eyes of Kahn's American audience.

Kahn was known for exemplifying a different path that Chinese women could take. At the time, women didn't have much to do outside of the family, but Kahn showed that missionary work, both religious and medical, was a viable path.
