= SS Manchuria =

Passenger and cargo liner

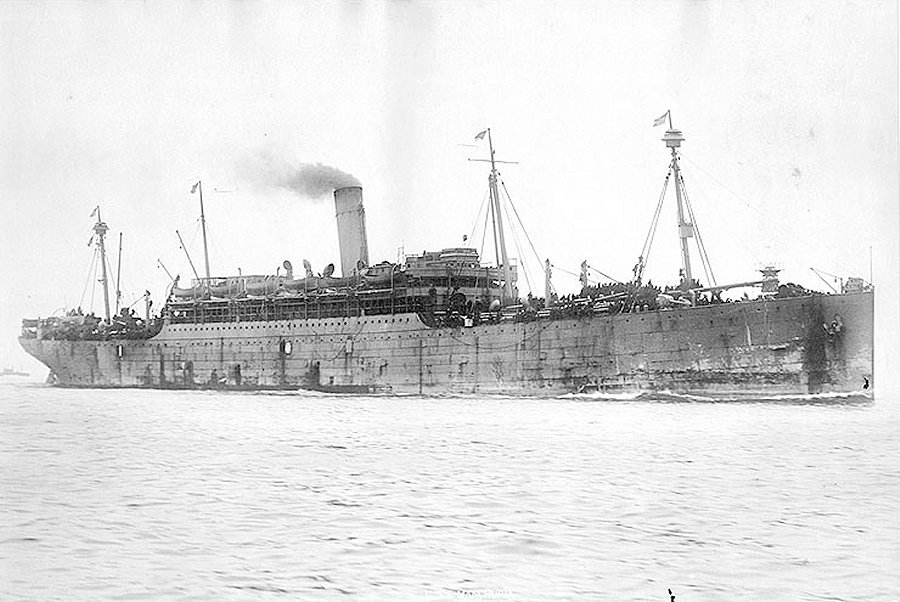
- USS Manchuria (ID-1633) underway in 1919

History
- Name: Manchuria
- Namesake: Manchuria
- Owner: 1902: Pacific Mail Steamship Co.; 1915: International Mercantile Marine Co.
- Operator: 1902: Pacific Mail Steamship Co.; 1915: Atlantic Transport Line
- Laid down: 3 September 1902
- Launched: 2 November 1903
- Sponsored by: Miss Laura Wick
- Fate: Expropriated by U.S. Navy, 1918

United States
- Name: Manchuria
- Acquired: 10 April 1918
- Commissioned: 25 April 1918
- Decommissioned: 11 September 1919
- Identification: ID-1633
- Fate: returned to IMM
- Name: 1919:Manchuria; 1928:President Johnson; 1948:Santa Cruz
- Namesake: 1928: President Andrew Johnson
- Owner: 1919: International Mercantile Marine Co.; 1928: Dollar Steamship Lines; 1938: United States Maritime Commission; 1948: Tagus Navigational Co.
- Operator: 1919: Atlantic Transport Line; 1923: Panama Pacific Line; 1928: Dollar Steamship Lines; 1938: American President Lines (through WSA); 1948: Societa Saicen
- Route: 1919: New York–Hamburg; 1923: New York–Panama Canal–San Francisco; 1928: round-the-world service; 1931: (Laid up)
- Fate: Scrapped 1952

General characteristics
- Tonnage: 13,639 GRT (1904 design) to 16,111 GRT Lloyd's Register 1945–46
- Displacement: 27,000 tons
- Length: 615 ft 8 in (187.66 m)
- Beam: 65 ft (19.8 m)
- Draft: 33 ft 6 in (10.21 m) (load mean)
- Speed: 16 knots (18 mph; 30 km/h)
- Armament: 1 × 6-inch (150 mm) gun; 2 × 4-inch (100 mm) guns; 1 × 1-pounder guns; 2 × machine guns

SS Manchuria was a passenger and cargo liner launched 1903 for the San Francisco-trans Pacific service of the Pacific Mail Steamship Company. During World War I, the ship was commissioned from 25 April 1918 to 11 September 1919 for United States Navy service as USS Manchuria (ID-1633). After returning to civilian service, the ship was acquired by the Dollar Steamship Line in 1928 until the line suffered financial difficulties in 1938 and ownership of Manchuria was taken over by the United States Maritime Commission, which chartered the ship to American President Lines, operating her as President Johnson. During World War II, she served as a War Shipping Administration transport with American President Lines as its agent, allocated to United States Army requirements. After World War II, she was returned to American President Lines, then sold and renamed Santa Cruz. The liner was scrapped in Italy in 1952.

== Construction ==
Manchuria was laid down by the New York Shipbuilding Company of Camden, New Jersey, for the Pacific Mail Steamship Company on 3 September 1902, among the first ships built at the yard as contract number six. An attempt to launch the ship on 31 October 1903 failed when the ship stuck on the ways. The ship was successfully launched on 2 November having been sponsored by Miss Laura Wick.

The design of Manchuria was identical to Mongolia which was delivered as Manchuria was being fitted out. Both were among the largest ships being built in the United States as had been the line's previous trans Pacific liners Korea and Siberia of 1902 and both were given the American Bureau of Shipping rating and Lloyd's Register classification of 100-A1. At the time of construction the two vessels were the largest passenger ships built in the United States and were built for 346 first class, 66 second class and 1,300 steerage passengers.

The ships' design tonnage was 13,639 GRT with tonnage for Manchuria increasing with modifications. On completion of a major refit 19 January 1929 for Dollar Line's around the world service the ship's tonnage is noted as being 14,328 GRT with a "sea speed" of 18 knots (21 mph; 33 km/h) indicating possible propulsion upgrades. Lloyd's Register of 1932–33 shows the ship, then President Johnson, at 15,543 GRT and in the 1945–46 register as 16,111 GRT. (Note: The Lloyd's change is shown between the 1940–41 and 1941–42 register issues.)

The hull was double bottomed with a capacity of 2,270 tons of fresh water for boilers or ship use with trimming tanks in the peaks and three deep tanks, one forward and two aft of the engine room, for a total water ballast of 4,600 tons. There were five complete decks composed of orlop, lower, middle, upper and shelter decks with the strength deck at the shelter deck rather than usual upper deck with ten watertight bulkheads running up to the upper deck. Normal coal capacity was 1,950 tons but that could be increased by use of reserve bunkers to 2,800 tons.

Two 10,000 indicated horsepower (7,500 kW), quadruple expansion four cylinder (30 inches (76.2 cm), 43 inches (109.2 cm), 63 inches (160.0 cm) and 89 inches (226.1 cm) all 5 feet (1.5 m) stroke) engines drove twin three bladed propellers with manganese bronze blades of 18 feet 6 inches (5.6 m) diameter with adjustable pitch from 21 feet 8 inches (6.6 m) to 25 feet 4 inches (7.7 m) on a cast iron hub. Electrical power was provided by three General Electric 25 kilowatt direct connected generators located in a recess aft of the main engine room and refrigeration by a carbonic anhydride plant, built by the British company J & E Hall, located below and aft of the engine room in a space between the shafts cooling about 9,000 cubic feet (254.9 m^{3}) of space and capable of producing up to 560 pounds (254.0 kg) of ice. Steam powering main engines and auxiliaries was provided by eight main, forced draft boilers; four double end and four single end, delivering steam at a working pressure of 215 pounds (97.5 kg). There was a small auxiliary boiler located on the middle deck aft of the after fire room hatch. A combined fire extinguishing and fumigation system could send gas for either purpose throughout the ship.

First-class passengers had quarters in the midship house on the bridge and shelter decks with access to a saloon lighted by a skylight and dining room. Some rooms had private lavatories, but lavatories for men and another for women were located aft of the engine casing on the shelter deck with another set in the center of the bridge deck accommodations. The upper deck was fitted for either light cargo or steerage passengers and, in the event of Chinese steerage passengers, had provision for a Chinese galley and wash area.

== Early career ==
Manchuria departed New York on 9 June 1904 for San Francisco to begin Pacific service with sister ship Mongolia. In connection with the United States recently having acquired territories of the Philippines, Guam and Hawaii and President Theodore Roosevelt wanted to show American influence in the area. He decided to send a diplomatic delegation to the area. On 8 July 1905 the Manchuria left San Francisco with a delegation led by Secretary of War William Howard Taft. As of 1907 Pacific Mail shows Manchuria, along with Mongolia, as being chartered vessels, though the company had paid for both Korea and Siberia, thus adding to an operating deficit for the period. Additional problems had fallen on the company, the disruption of the 1906 San Francisco earthquake and fire, political instability in Central American republics and specific "disasters" to Manchuria and Mongolia in Hawaiian waters. Manchuria was disabled at Oahu and had to be put into dry dock in November 1906 for repairs that were completed by 1 June 1907 but her exit was delayed by San Francisco strikes and delayed permanent repairs to Mongolia that had been damaged in an incident at Midway.

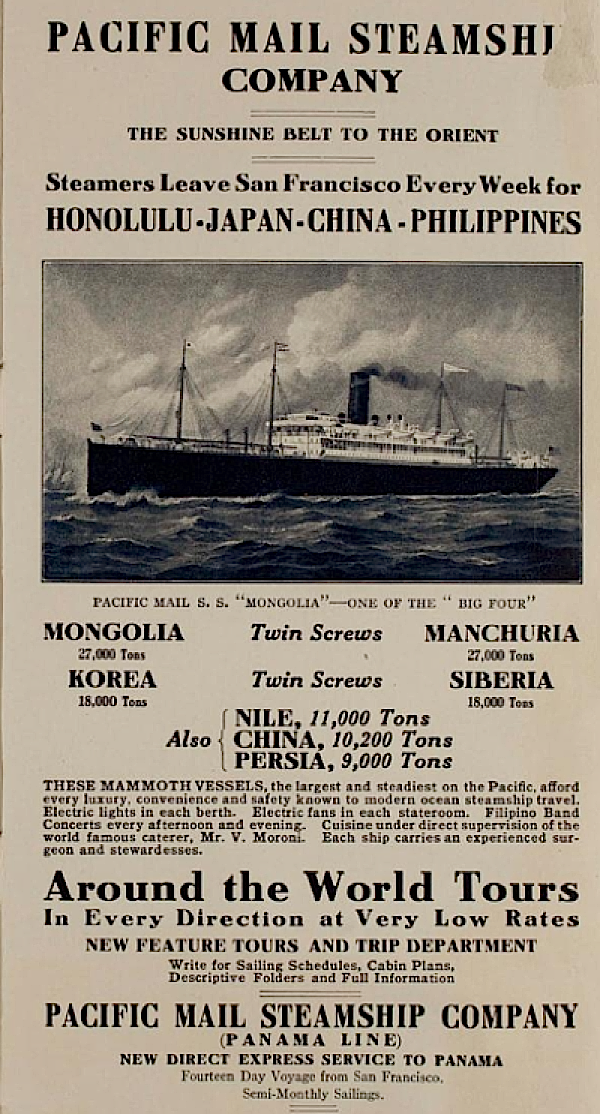
1915 advertisement shortly before the ships were sold

The disaster to Manchuria occurred at 4:10 in the morning on 20 August 1906 when the ship went aground between Rabbit Island and Oahu resulting first in evacuation of passengers and mail during the day as efforts were organized to pull the ship off the reef. Damage progressed even as the efforts to pull the ship off the reef continued over a period of days with mention "boilers are starting from their foundation and may go out of commission" in a communication dated 23 August. At 12:50 in the afternoon of 16 September Manchuria is noted as "coming off the reef" and being towed stern first. It had taken a small fleet of vessels, including the Commercial Pacific Cable Company's CS Restorer, "USS Manning" (Note: Manning, despite court references, was not in U.S.N. commission at the time but was under the United States Revenue Cutter Service and taking her 13 December 1905–8 May 1907 Hawaiian break from Bering Sea Patrol duties.) and USS Iroquois among various commercial and government vessels involved in taking off passengers, luggage, mail and cargo, delivering water and supplies and other functions. The apparent misunderstanding of the arrangements for Restorer in the salvage resulted in claims in court.

The strange coincidence of two of the company's ships stranding in the Hawaiian Islands within hours and the brief stranding of the Army transport from the Philippines, USAT Sheridan, also aground on Oahu, was likely not coincidental. The 1906 Valparaíso earthquake had occurred hours earlier and mariners' descriptions of a "tremor" spreading on the Pacific's bed and "disturbing currents" at the time of the strandings would now be recognized as indications of tsunami effects.

By 1907 predictions of economic trouble had become fact with the consequence, in the words of His Majesty's consul in Manila in his report for 1907, that "the American flag disappears from the Pacific trade with the single exception of the Northern Pacific Steamship Company's passenger-freighter Minnesota." (Note: The Minnesota referenced would be the 20,602 ton ship of 1904, a predecessor of Northern Pacific's Great Northern and sister of Dakota, that was built by Eastern Shipbuilding Company, New London, Connecticut and sold for scrap in 1923.) Robert Dollar noted that Pacific Mail anticipated enforcement of a seamen's act that would "make it impossible to operate American ships profitably in foreign trade" competing with foreign lines and sold its ships before waiting until the act was actually enforced—as it was not. In a Pacific left "almost devoid of the American flag" by 1916 the five ships Korea, Siberia, China, Mongolia and Manchuria had been sold in the fall of 1915 to International Mercantile Marine Company for $5,250,000 (£1,075,000) which registered most of its ships under the British flag. The ship began service with one of International Mercantile Marine's subsidiary companies, the American Line, in 1915. (Note: In 1921 International Mercantile Marine Company owned all stock in the American Line, Atlantic Transport Line, George Thompson and Company, Ltd., Leyland Line, Panama-Pacific Line, Red Star Line, White Star Line, White Star—Dominion Line and held minority interest in Shaw, Savill and Albion Company, Ltd., Holland-America Line and the New York Shipbuilding Corporation. The fleet total was 120 ocean-going ships aggregating not less than 1,300,000 gross register tons.(Pacific Marine Review, November 1921, page 654.))

At 19:16 on 13 June 1917, Manchuria was standing out of New York Harbor in a thick fog when she collided with the United States Navy monitor USS Amphitrite, suffering damage below the waterline. Attempting to clear, Manchuria scraped the Amphitrite′s bow, and her propeller strut fouled her cable, holding her fast for 20 minutes. Manchuria lowered her boats and her crew abandoned ship; two section patrol boats and a motor sailer stood by and took her lifeboats in tow. Ultimately, Manchuria was towed and beached off Tompkinsville, Staten Island, New York.

== World War I ==
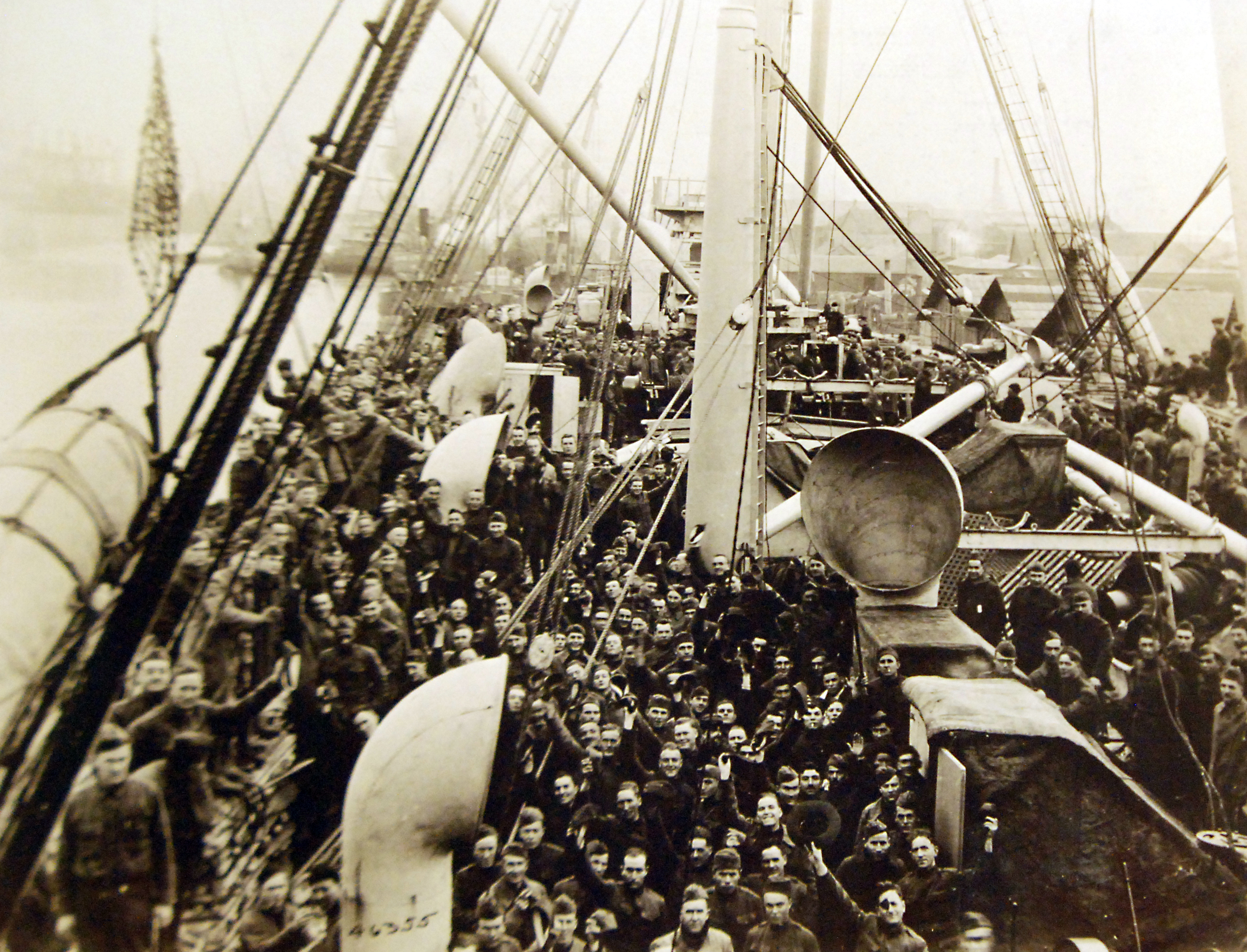
U.S. Army troops on board Manchuria leaving France to return to the United States.

The United States Shipping Board requisitioned Manchuria and Mongolia from the Atlantic Transport Line, a subsidiary of International Mercantile Marine, and turned the ships over to the Army in January and February, 1918. (Note: Both American Line and Atlantic Transport Line were subsidiaries of the International Mercantile Marine Company (see article) and exactly which line "owned" the ship's hull is perhaps the reason for the apparent difference in ship's operation by American Line and references having the ship "acquired" from Atlantic Transport Line.) The two ships were among the largest transports with a troop capacity of around 5,000. In late January 1918, with the "shipping situation getting out of hand" the regular meeting of top government and military logistics people decided to create the Shipping Control Committee (SCC) that was ratified in early February with the consequence the Army turned its entire fleet over to the SCC resulting in the Navy operating those ships.

Manchuria was acquired by the Navy from the United States Shipping Board on 10 April 1918 and commissioned USS Manchuria (ID-1633) at New York on 25 April 1918 and assigned to the Cruiser and Transport Force. Manchuria departed New York with a convoy on 30 April with the 18th Field Artillery and the 153d and 154th Infantry Battalions embarked for Europe arriving in Saint-Nazaire, France, on 13 May to debark her passengers. Five days later she returned to the east coast, arriving at New York on 30 May.

The troop transport made 13 round trips to Europe with nine of them after the Armistice, bringing approximately 39,500 troops home. On 25 August 1919 she arrived New York, decommissioned there 11 September, and was returned to her owner.

== Interwar years ==
Manchuria began service on the New York to Hamburg with the American Line in December 1919.

In 1923 she was shifted to New York–Panama Canal–San Francisco run to operate under another subsidiary of International Mercantile Marine Co., the Panama Pacific Line.

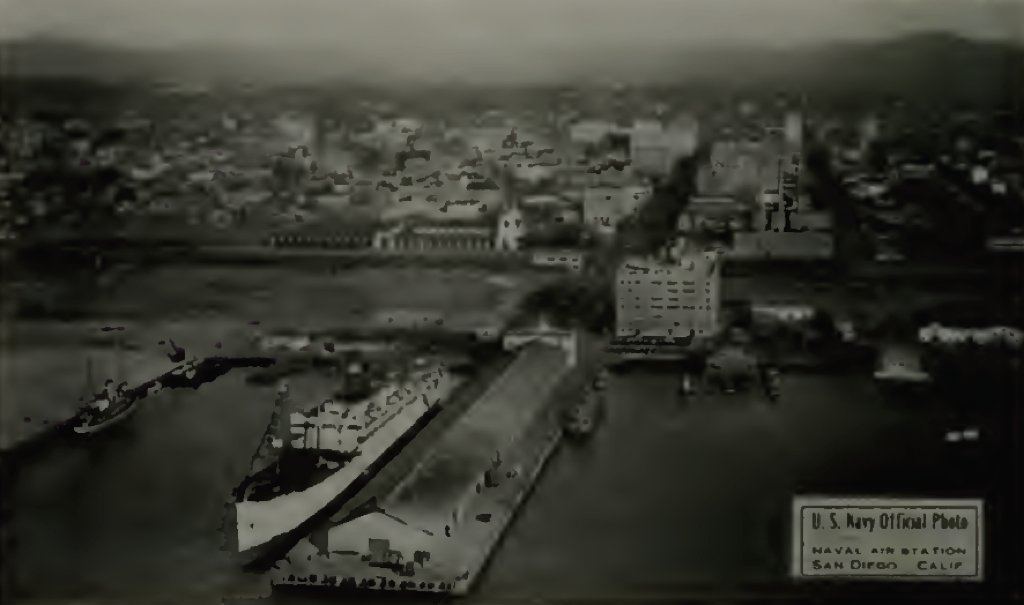
Manchuria at new municipal pier, San Diego, California 1925, where increased demand made San Diego a Panama Pacific port of call.

In November 1924 the ship and line's regularly scheduled ports of call for Manchuria, Mongolia, Finland and Kroonland included San Diego, with the new schedule being New York and San Diego, Los Angeles, San Francisco and Oakland, California, Portland, Oregon and Seattle and Tacoma, Washington. Until the scheduled departure of Manchuria from New York on 12 February 1925 only passenger traffic had been accepted for San Diego, but with regional and city leaders urging service the line began accepting freight as well beginning that departure.

On 1 November 1928 she was renamed President Johnson and sold seven days later to Dollar Steamship Lines for round‑the‑world cruises. On 3 November 1928 Dollar delivered the ship to Newport News Shipbuilding & Drydock Company for a major refit and passenger space renovation that was completed 19 January 1929. All old first class quarters were stripped and replaced with seventy-five staterooms and twenty-five new private baths for 175 first class passengers. All public rooms were renovated, a new deck house was built on the boat deck for a smoking room and verandah cafe with a 40 feet (12.2 m) by 60 feet (18.3 m) "play ground" atop. Much of the interior decoration and furnishing was done in San Francisco and shipped east to the shipyard for installation. A steel tank swimming pool was added on top of the after deck house.

President Johnson was being featured in the first class only around the world service "as you please" with 1930 fares as low as $1,110 or $1,370 with private bath and tickets good for two years for visiting twenty-two ports in fourteen countries. Departures from the United States by a President liner every two weeks from the Puget Sound ports for Japan and around the world while another President liner departed New York every two weeks for Cuba and California by the Panama Canal and then from Seattle and Vancouver, Canada for the voyage to Japan and around the world. In 1933 the ship was chartered for the 7th Annual Floating University around the world voyage of 137 days visiting 37 countries and islands, 45 ports and 140 cities and places with credit granted by special arrangement throu universities. The ship, to depart 4 February from New York, is described as a "floating campus" with class rooms, library, athletic facilities with student fares as low as $1,325 including tuition and shore trips. (Note: A number of student newspaper announcements during late 1932 to January 1933 with more detail note this is the first annual trip on a United States registered ship.)

The Dollar Steamship Company, along with other Dollar companies and the ships were acquired by the United States Maritime Commission in an Adjustment Agreement on 15 August 1938 in which stock in the line was transferred to release $7,500,000 of the line's debt. The commission invested $4,500,000 in the new American President Lines with, over the years, $20,000,000 in grants to the line.

== World War II ==
On 29 November 1941 the War Shipping Administration (WSA) took control of President Johnson from American President Lines and allocated the ship for Army use, though the ship was operated by American President Lines as the WSA agent. (Note: The Army never operated the ship under a bareboat charter and thus strictly speaking the ship was never formally a United States Army Transport (U.S.A.T.). American President Lines operated the vessel under various agreements until the ship was redelivered to the company by WSA.)

President Johnson, along with the Army chartered Etolin and the Army transport Tasker H. Bliss, departed from San Francisco for the Philippines on 5 December with 2,500 troops, the 2d Battalion of the 138th Field Artillery Regiment and three squadrons of the 35th Pursuit Group aboard. Upon the attack on Pearl Harbor the ships, including the WSA transport President Garfield which had departed 6 December, turned back and unloaded the some 15,000 troops and supplies aboard the ships 8–9 December. (Note: President Garfield had come under War Shipping Administration control on 29 November 1941 and was operated by American President Lines as a troop transport until acquired by the Navy 1 May 1943 to be USS Thomas Jefferson the remainder of the war. (MARAD Vessel Status Card information)) On 31 January 1942 the ship left San Francisco transporting the garrison for Christmas Island, code named BIRCH, that was a critical link in the South Pacific lines of communication to Australia. The garrison, designated Task Force 4591, transported was composed of an infantry battalion, two battalions of coast artillery, the 12th Pursuit Squadron and the 150-bed 1st Station Hospital composed of 14 officers and 100 enlisted men for a total of about 2,000 troops that arrived at the island 10 February.

President Johnson continued transporting troops for the next two years in support of the amphibious operations which had penetrated by July 1945 to the Japanese home islands. With stops at Eniwetok and Guam, Marshalls; Ulithi, Carolines; Peleliu, Palaus; and Espiritu Santo, New Hebrides, long behind her, President Johnson returned to San Francisco 14 January 1946 to end her World War II service as a troop transport.

== Later career ==
President Johnson was redelivered to control of American President Lines on 2 March 1946. The Maritime Commission approved the sale of the ship to Transmar Ltd. of Lisbon and change to Panamanian registry. On 10 January 1947 President Johnson was sold to Tagus Navigational Co. of Panama City, Panama and renamed Santa Cruz. The ship was intended for general trade between Portugal and South American ports in Brazil and Argentina with particular attention to emigrants from Portugal to those countries. General Engineering & Dry Dock Company was contracted to remove all armament and military equipment, convert the troop berthing spaces into spaces for 1,200 steerage passengers, convert the troop ship officer's quarters into space for 134 cabin class passengers and restoration of the public spaces (Social Hall, Tea Room Verandah, Smoking Room and dining) of the ship to civilian levels. Machinery was examined, overhauled and replaced where necessary and the ship's plumbing and electrical systems modified for the rearranged spaces. The work, costing well over $1,000,000 was completed in thirty-eight days. She was chartered to Societa Saicen of Savona, Italy, in 1948 to transport Italian war refugees to South America. The transport was scrapped at Savona on 12 January 1952.

== Notable passengers ==
- Li Bi Cu, medical doctor, 1905

== Bibliography ==
- American International Corporation (1920). History and development of New York Shipbuilding Corporation.
- American Mail Line & Dollar Steamship Lines (1904). "(advertisement) Oh the Monkeys Have No Tails in Zamboanga". House & Garden. 58 (September 1930). Greenwich, Connecticut: Condé Nast Publications, Inc.
- Condon-Rall, Mary Ellen; Cowdrey, Albert E. (1998). The Technical Services—The Medical Department: Medical Service In The War Against Japan. United States Army In World War II. Washington, DC: Center Of Military History, United States Army. LCCN 97022644.
- Crowell, Benedict; Wilson, Robert Forrest (1921). The Road to France : The Transportation of Troops and Military Supplies. How America Went to War. Vol. 2. New Haven: Yale University Press. LCCN 21004109.
- Grover, David (1987). U.S. Army Ships and Watercraft of World War II. Naval Institute Press. ISBN 0-87021-766-6. LCCN 87015514.
- Dollar, Robert (1931). One Hundred Thirty Years of Steam Navigation. San Francisco: Robert Dollar Company. LCCN 89894952.
- Baker, Bernard Nadal; Essary, J. Frederick (1916). Ships. Baltimore: John Murphy Company. LCCN 16003124.
- Coffee, Frank (1920). Forty years on the Pacific. New York: Oceanic Publishing Company. LCCN 20013140.
- Horne (Acting Consul General, Manila), H. (1908). Report on the Trade and Commerce of the Philippine Islands for the Year 1907. Diplomatic and Consular Reports. Annual Series. London: His Majesty's Stationery Office.
- Lloyds. "Lloyd's Register 1932–33" (PDF). Lloyd's Register (through PlimsollShipData).
- Lloyds. "Lloyd's Register 1945–46" (PDF). Lloyd's Register (through PlimsollShipData).
- Marine Engineering (1904). "Steamship Manchuria". Marine Engineering. 9 (January 1904). New York: Marine Engineering Incorporated: 121.
- Marine Engineering (1904). "New Steamship Mongolia for the Pacific Mail Steamship Company". Marine Engineering. 9 (April 1904). New York: Marine Engineering Incorporated: 151–159.
- Marine Engineering (1904). "Pacific Mail Steamship Manchuria". Marine Engineering. 9 (July 1904). New York: Marine Engineering Incorporated: 306.
- Marine Engineering (1916). "Japanese Line Buys Former Pacific Mail Steamers". Marine Engineering. 21 (June 1916). New York: Marine Engineering Incorporated: 310.
- Maritime Administration. "President Johnson". Ship History Database Vessel Status Card. U.S. Department of Transportation, Maritime Administration.
- Maritime Administration. "President Garfield". Ship History Database Vessel Status Card. U.S. Department of Transportation, Maritime Administration. Archived from the original on April 2, 2015.
- Matloff, Maurice; Snell, Edwin M. (1953). The War Department: Strategic Planning For Coalition Warfare 1941–1942. United States Army In World War II. Washington, DC: Center Of Military History, United States Army. LCCN 53061477.
- Naval History And Heritage Command. "Manchuria". Dictionary of American Naval Fighting Ships. Naval History And Heritage Command.
- "The New York Shipbuilding Corporation". Pacific Marine Review. 22 (April 1921). San Francisco: J.S. Hines. 1921.
- "Panama Pacific Line". Pacific Marine Review. 18 (February 1925). San Francisco: J.S. Hines. 1925.
- "Art Modern in Passenger Accommodations". Pacific Marine Review. 26 (March 1929). San Francisco: J.S. Hines: A—F following p. 100. 1929.
- "President Johnson Reconverted for Portugal-South American Route". Pacific Marine Review. 44 (April 1947). San Francisco: J.S. Hines. 1947.
- Pacific Mail Steamship Company (1907). "Annual Report, Year ended April 30, 1907". [New York?.
- United States Court of Appeals For the Ninth Circuit (1909). "Apostles on Appeal—Pacific Mail Steamship Company vs. Commercial Pacific Cable Company".
- United States Court of Appeals For the Ninth Circuit (1909). "Apostles on Cross Appeal—Commercial Pacific Cable Company vs. Pacific Mail Steamship Company".
- United States Court of Appeals For the Ninth Circuit No. 13130 (1952). "United States of America vs. R. Stanley Dollar, Dollar Steamship Line, The Robert Dollar Company, etc".
- University Travel Association (January 17, 1933). "(advertisement) The Floating University World Cruise". The Cavalier Daily.
- Zirinsky, Steve (2013). "SS Manchuria" (PDF). The Informer. 77 (January 2013): 8.
