= Bread of Life Church =

Chinese church

The Bread of Life Church (Chinese: 靈糧堂; pinyin: Ling Liang Tang) is an independent Chinese church founded in Shanghai, Republic of China, in 1942, which now has churches in Asia, Australia, and North America.

== History ==
During the Second Sino-Japanese War, the International Settlement in Shanghai was seized by Japanese troops in December 1941, putting a stop to Western missions in the region. The next year, in June 1942, the Christian and Missionary Alliance pastor Timothy Dzao (Chinese: 趙世光; 1908–1973) established the Bread of Life Church in Shanghai. It aspired to be an indigenous church which followed the three-self principle.

By the time of the communist victory in mainland China, Dzao moved his headquarters first to Hong Kong in 1949, before moving it to Taipei, Taiwan in 1954. When Nathaniel Chow (周神助; born 1941) became the senior pastor of the Bread of Life Church in Taipei (1977–2011), the church began have a stronger emphasis on a charismatic infilling of the Holy Spirit.

The church started a seminary in 1990 and, in 2005, the church was reported to have 33,132 members in Taiwan and 134 churches worldwide.
