= Bethel Bible Seminary =

Seminary in Hong Kong

Coordinates: 22.331516°N 114.186331°E

- Traditional Chinese: 伯特利神學院
Transcriptions
Yue: Cantonese
- Yale Romanization: Baak dahk leih sàhn hohk yuhn
- Jyutping: Baak3 dak6 lei6 san4 hok6 jyun6

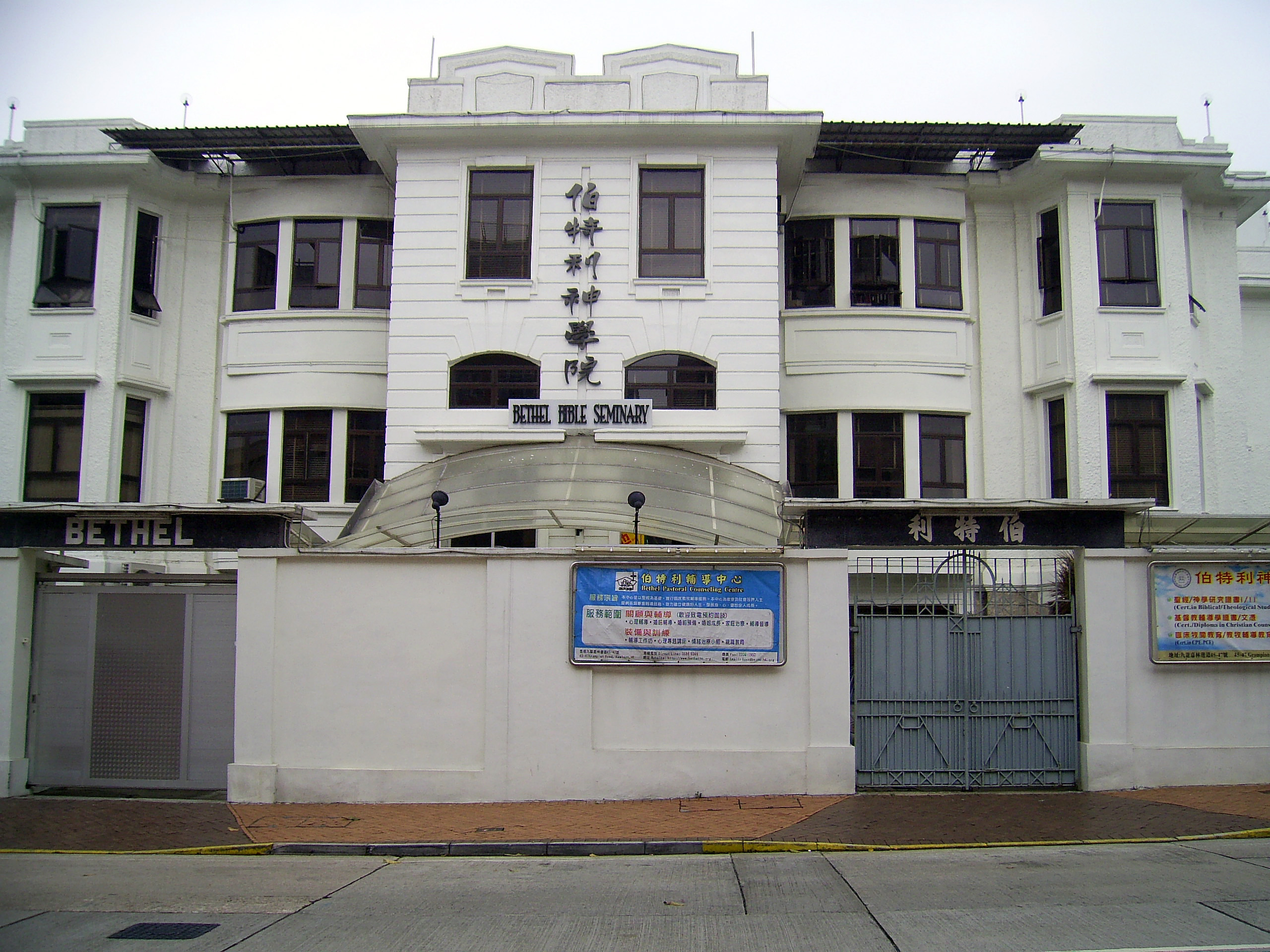

Bethel Bible Seminary is located at 45-47 Grampian Road Kowloon in Hong Kong. It was founded in 1925 as part of the Bethel Mission in Shanghai. It was first named Bethel Bible College, offering a three-year curriculum. It moved to Hong Kong in 1938 and was renamed Bethel Bible Seminary in 1947, changing to a four-year curriculum offering a Bachelor of Theology degree.

== Principal and dean ==
- 1930-1973: Dr. Alice Lan (藍如溪院長)
- 1973-1990: Rev. Donald C. Y. Wong (黃卓英院長)
- 1990-2008: Rev. Gaspard K.T. Lam (林錦濤院長)
- 2008-2009: Rev. Yiu Kam Hung - Acting (姚鏡鴻署理院長)
- July 2009 – June 2019: Dr. Fai Luk (陸輝院長)
- June 2019 – Present: Rev. Dr. Wat Wai Ho (屈偉豪院長)

== Grade 2 Historic Building ==
Its building was listed as historic building in 1993, and on 18 December 2009, was recognized as a Grade II historic building by Leisure and Cultural Service Department - HKSAR Government.

== Building redevelopment plan ==
For development, Board of Director of Bethel Church decided to redevelop the seminary building.

Regarding to the Minutes of 470th Meeting of the Metro Planning Committee of Town Planning Board (HKSAR Government) on 7 September 2012, the application was approved in principle.

== Course development ==
- In 1989, set up Certificates in Biblical/Theological Studies for Church Leaders.
- In 1994, set up Certificates/Diploma in Christian Counseling, Clinical Pastoral Education and Pastoral Counseling Education.
- In 1997, affiliated with Acadia University and Started offering Master of Divinity, Master of Art (Theology) and Master of Theological Studies.
- In 1998, registered as a professional organization {The Association for Clinical Pastoral Education and Pastoral Counseling Education (Hong Kong) Limited.} HKACPE/PCE, hoping that this organization will help promote the training.
- In 1998, set up Bethel Pastoral Counseling Centre to promote a Bible-based counseling to integrate our faith with counseling and to serve the community at large.
- In 1999, set up a new program in Bachelor of Theological Studies for lay leader to do move in depth research and studies in Bible and in Theology.
- In 2004, set up Master of Christian Marriage & Family Therapy
- In 2006, set up Master of Christian Counseling & Social Service
- In 2007, set up Bachelor of Christian Counseling and Christian Education
- In 2012, set up Doctorate program in Ministry, Transformational Leadership
