= Jennie V. Hughes =

American Methodist missionary in China (1873–1951)

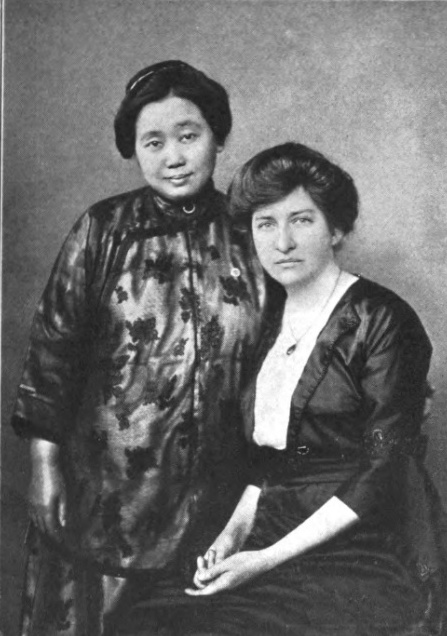
- Shi Meiyu and Jennie V. Hughes, from the frontispiece of their book Chinese Heart-Throbs (1920)
- Born: Jennie Van Name Hughes; March 9, 1873; Woodstown, New Jersey, U.S.
- Died: November 29, 1951 (aged 78); Los Angeles, California, U.S.
- Occupation: Christian missionary in China

Jennie V. Hughes (胡遵理; March 9, 1873 – November 29, 1951) was an American Methodist missionary in China. She co-founded the Bethel Mission in Shanghai with Chinese doctor Shi Meiyu (Mary Stone).

== Early life ==
Jennie Van Name Hughes was from Ocean Grove, New Jersey, the daughter of George Hughes (1823–1904) and Abby Townley Van Name Hughes. Her father was an English-born Methodist minister and editor. Her older sister Eliza Ann Hughes Davis was also a missionary in China, her older sister Mary Ernsberger was a missionary in India, and her older brother George Mead Hughes was a Methodist minister. Her maternal aunt, Nettie Van Name, was an evangelical singer.

== Career ==
Hughes went to China as a missionary in 1905, commissioned by the Woman's Foreign Missionary Society of the Methodist Episcopal Church to teach in Jiujiang. Hughes was principal of the Knowles Bible Training School at Jiujiang. She worked with Shi Meiyu (Mary Stone), and the two traveled to the United States together in 1907 for Stone's health. Hughes was in the United States from 1910 to 1912, for the Woman's Missionary Society's jubilee celebrations, touring with other American women missionaries to speak at events in different cities, including Pittsburgh Washington, D.C., and Oakland.

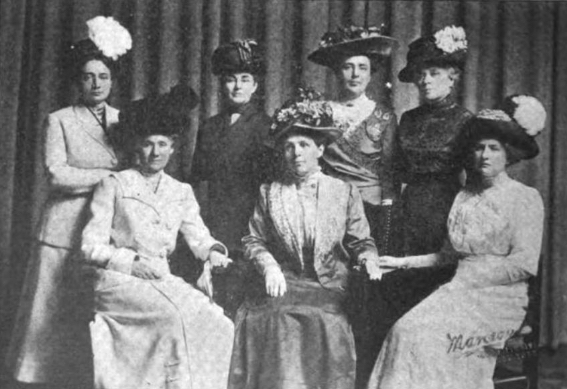
American women missionaries speaking at jubilee celebrations in 1911. Front row: Florence Miller, Helen Barrett Montgomery, Jennie V. Hughes; Back row: Mary Riggs Noble, Etta Doane Marden, Mrs. W. T. Elmore, and Mary E. Carleton.

In 1915 Hughes and Stone were injured in a car accident in La Jolla, California, and stayed in the United States into 1916 to recover. After another leave and lecture tour in the United States in 1919, the pair left the Methodist mission at Jiujiang in 1920, over a disagreement about doctrine.

Hughes and Stone, along with Mary Stone's sister Phoebe Stone, began the non-denominational Bethel Mission in Shanghai in 1920. Bethel Mission included a chapel, a hospital, schools, an orphanage, a printing service, and housing for staff and students. Hughes wrote a book of short stories, Chinese Heart-Throbs (1920), with an introduction by Stone. In October 1920, the pair toured several Chinese cities, "combining lectures on health with evangelism", at schools and YMCA halls, and to nursing groups.

In 1925, the Bethel Mission helped treat wounded soldiers during unrest in Shanghai. "All our remaining schoolgirls are sleeping here," Hughes wrote in a report from the scene. "The teachers and a few boys will come here if firing begins, and we will hide in the cellar. We have wounded soldiers from both sides. One officer is very bad and will likely die tonight."

== Personal life ==
With increasing danger from war, Hughes and Stone moved their mission to Hong Kong in 1937, and left for America. In 1939 they moved to Pasadena, California with their three adopted daughters, Mary, Grace, and Norma, and two other girls, Loretta Soong and Eileen Chen Lin. Hughes died in California in 1951, aged 77 years. Some of her letters are in the Eliza Ann Hughes Davis papers at the University of Oregon Libraries. One historian describes Hughes and Stone's 45-year professional and personal partnership as "the most notable special friendship on the mission field."

Bethel Mission continues in the form of Bethel High School in Hong Kong.
