= Mary Stone (doctor) =

Chinese medical doctor (1873–1954)

- Shi Meiyu
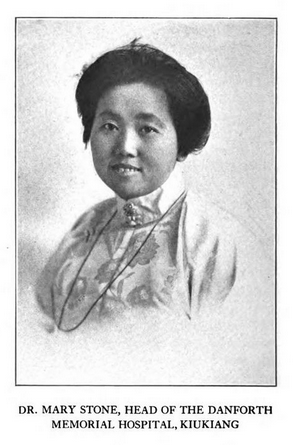
- From a 1918 publication
- Born: 1 May 1873; Kiukiang (Jiujiang), Jiangxi, Qing China
- Died: 30 December 1954 (aged 81); Pasadena, California, United States
- Other name: Shi Meiyu (Chinese: 石美玉)
- Education: University of Michigan, Ann Arbor (MD)

Mary Stone (May 1, 1873 – December 30, 1954), also known as Shi Meiyu (Chinese: 石美玉), was a doctor of medicine graduated from the University of Michigan. She founded Danforth Memorial Hospital in Kiukiang (now called the Women and Children's Hospital of Jiujiang).

== Life ==
Born to a Chinese Christian family in Kiukiang (now called Jiujiang) on May 1, 1873, Stone's father was a Methodist pastor and mother was the principal of a Methodist school for girls. She attended Rulison-Fish Memorial School (now called Jiujiang Tongwen Middle School), established by American missionary Gertrude Howe, in Jiujiang for ten years. Inspired by the American medical missionary Dr. Kate Bushnell, her father hoped to train her as a medical doctor.

In 1892, she was brought to Ann Arbor, Michigan by Gertrude Howe, together with Ida Kahn (Kang Cheng), for professional training in the west, where she and Kahn became "not only the first Asians to earn degrees at the University of Michigan, but they were also among the first Chinese women ever to become Western-trained physicians" in 1896.

In the Fall of 1896, she and Ida Kahn returned to Kiukiang as medical missionaries of the Women's Foreign Missionary Society of the Methodist Episcopal Church. Two years later, with donations from Dr. I. N. Danforth of Chicago, they established Elizabeth Skelton Danforth Hospital in Jiujiang, named after Dr. Danforth's wife, which later became the Jiujiang Women and Children's Hospital.

Between 1918 and 1919, she received the Rockefeller Foundation scholarship to do postgraduate work at Johns Hopkins University, where her sister, Phebe Stone, was a medicine graduate. During her time in Hopkins, Phebe was in charge of the Elizabeth Skelton Danforth Hospital.

Stone was not only well known as a medical professional, but also for her Christian missionary work. Between 1920 and 1937, she was involved in starting multiple hospitals, schools and churches in China. In particular, she partnered with Phebe and the former American Methodist Episcopal missionary Jennie V. Hughes and established the Bethel Mission in Shanghai in 1920, which would later be the basis for Andrew Gih's Bethel Worldwide Evangelistic Band. She is also a member of the China Continuation Committee of the National Missionary Conference after the Edinburgh World Missionary Conference of 1910.

She returned to California after World War II, where she later died on December 30, 1954, in Pasadena at the age of 81.
