= Spuistraat =

Former canal, now street, in Amsterdam

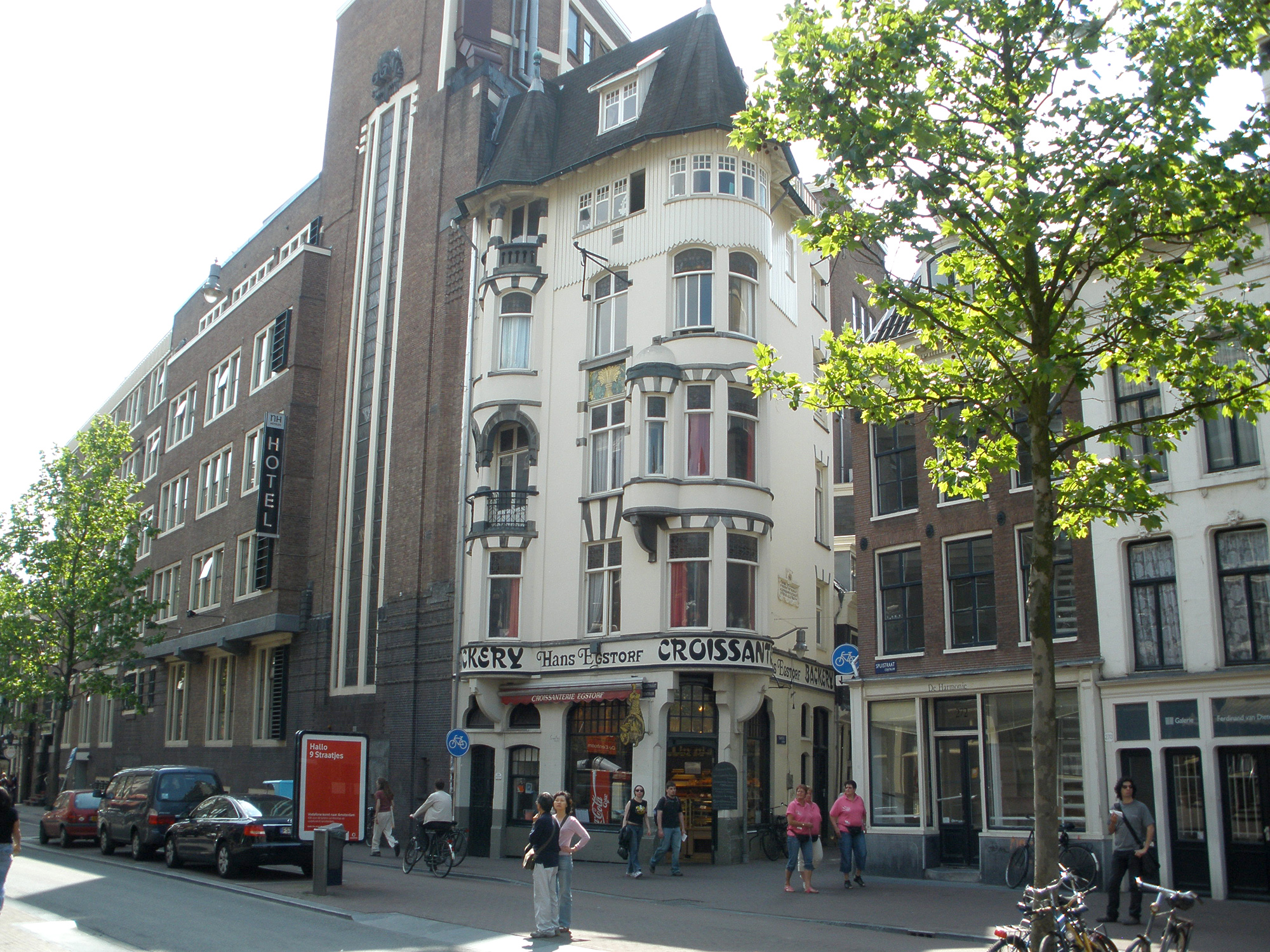
- Bakery D.C. Stähle on Spuistraat 274, a Jugendstil design from 1898 by Gerrit van Arkel. On the left, the 1924 Gerzon building
- Location: Amsterdam, Centrum
- Postal code: 1012
- Coordinates: 52.373056°N 4.889444°E
- From: Spui
- To: Hekelveld

Construction
- Inauguration: Named in 1867

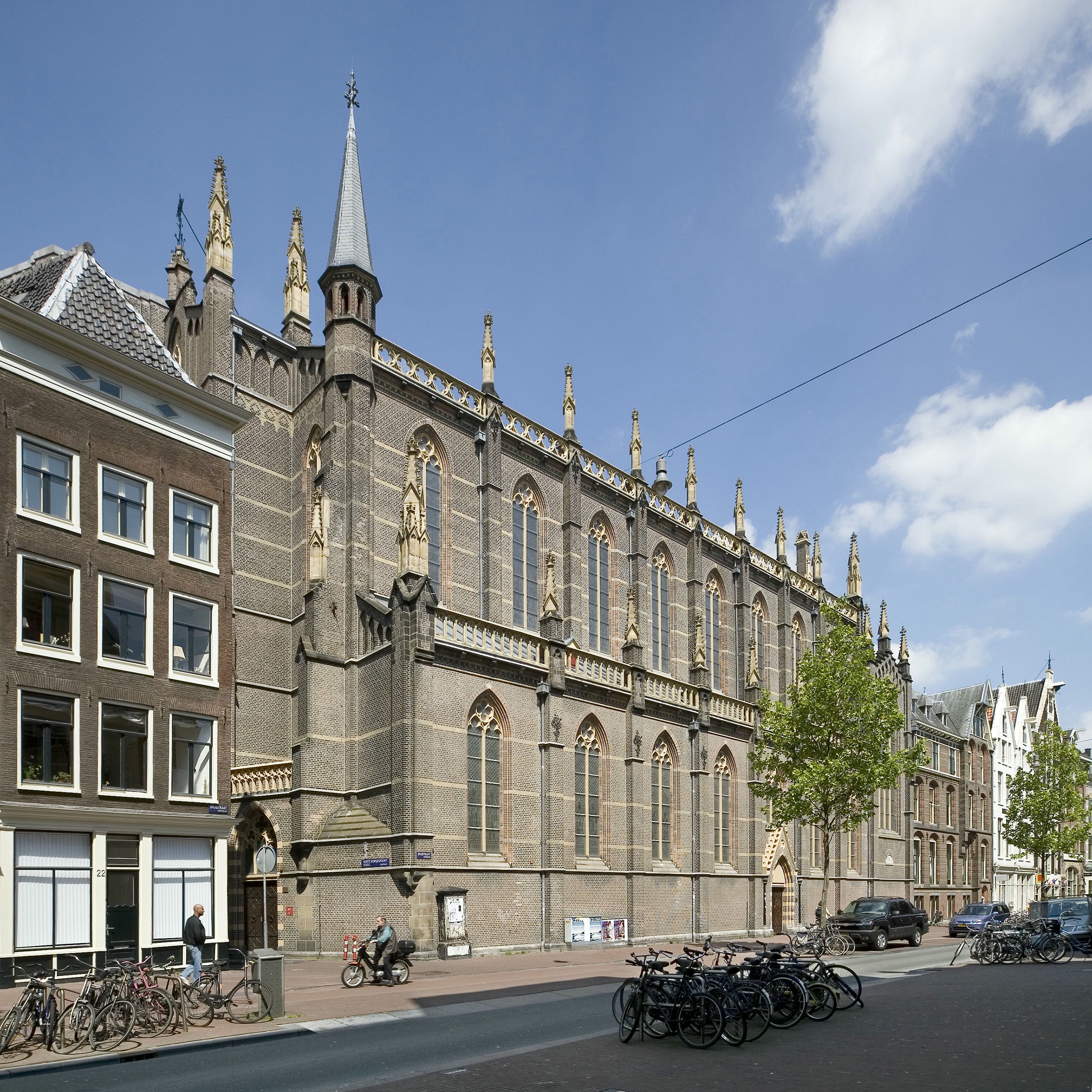
Roman Catholic Dominicus church, southern gable on the Spuistraat.

The Spuistraat in downtown Amsterdam connects the Hekelveld to the Spui. It runs roughly north to south, parallel to the Singel and the Nieuwezijds Voorburgwal. At the Royal Palace of Amsterdam, the Spuistraat crosses the Raadhuisstraat and Paleisstraat. Originally the Spuistraat was a canal, the Nieuwezijds Achterburgwal. The canal was filled up in 1867, and the street was then renamed.

== History ==
=== Nieuwezijds Achterburgwal ===
The Nieuwezijds Achterburgwal (New Side Behind Bastion Wall (Note: In the Middle Ages Amsterdam lay on both sides of the Amstel river where it entered the IJ body of water from the south. The eastern part was the Oudezijd (old side) and the western part was the Nieuwezijd (new side). When the first burgwal (bastion wall) was built, the Voorburgwal ran in front of it as a moat. When the second bastion wall was built further out, the Achterburgwal ran behind it, on the town side. The name "Nieuwezijds Achterburgwal" refers to the canal that ran behind (on the city side of) the second bastion wall on the new side of Amsterdam.)) is a former canal in Amsterdam, the Netherlands. From around 1380 to 1450 it was part of the town's defenses, forming the western limit of the medieval city of Amsterdam.

Until about the 14th century, the river Amstel divided the city in two roughly equal parts—the Oudezijde with the Oude Kerk and the Nieuwezijde with the Nieuwe Kerk. In 1342 a simple earthen embankment was raised to protect the small town of Amsterdam, with a narrow canal in front of it where the Oudezijds Voorburgwal and Nieuwezijds Voorburgwal are today.

As the town grew, new defenses were built further out: the Oudezijds Achterburgwal in 1367 and the Nieuwezijds Achterburgwal in 1380.

At this time the town's population was between 3,000 and 5,000, so construction of the fortifications would have been a huge effort. To protect the city, a canal was dug on each side, with a city wall behind it made of dirt with a wooden palisade. When new fortifications were built around 1385, the existing ones became "Voorburgwal" ("voor" meaning "in front"), and the new ones "Achterburgwal" ("achter" meaning "behind"), on both the old side and the new side. This created the Oudezijds Voorburgwal, Oudezijds Achterburgwal, Nieuwezijds Voorburgwal, and Nieuwezijds Achterburgwal, dug in 1380.

Amsterdam continued to grow, and in 1425 a broad new canal was dug further east of the town, where the Geldersekade and Kloveniersburgwal are today. Twenty-five years later the Singel was completed round the west side of the city from the IJ to the Amstel.

The Nieuwezijds Voorburgwal no longer had a defensive purpose.

The brewery "De Hooiberg" was established on the Nieuwezijds Voorburgwal in 1592 on the site now occupied by the Hotel Die Port van Cleve. It was very successful, and in the years that followed, the building was expanded between the Nieuwezijds Voorburgwal and Nieuwezijds Voorburgwal. In 1863 the building complex was bought by Gerard Adriaan Heineken. After the canal was filled in, Heineken moved his brewery to the Stadhouderskade in Amsterdam.

The Nieuwezijds Achterburgwal had warehouses and stables that belonged to the larger houses on the Nieuwezijds Voorburgwal.

In May 1621 the printer and newspaper publisher Broer Jansz (1579–1652) settled on the Nieuwezijds Achterburgwal in a house named the "Silvere Can". He remained here for the rest of his career.

The Donkere Sluis was built between 1625 and 1657 connecting the Singel to the Nieuwezijds Voorburgwal via the Nieuwezijds Achterburgwal. It provided a water route between the old city and the expansion beyond the Singel. Without it, water traffic had to use the Kattengat or the Boerenverdriet.

With the third expansion, the grachtengordel (canal belt) had cross-canals at regular intervals, solving the problem. Since land was in short supply, in the 1661 the City horse stables were built over the Donkere Sluis.

By the mid-1800s, the canal mainly held warehouses and stables near the houses on Nieuwezijds Voorburgwal. The canal was a long, smelly ditch with uneven and narrow quays.

The city council decided to fill in the Nieuwezijds Achterburgwal on 28 January 1866. The canal was filled in 1868 at the same time as the Kattegat, a ditch between Nieuwezijds Achterburgwal and the Stroomarkt. The purpose was to improve public health and to make the city more accessible. The change seems to have been popular with the residents. The name was changed to Spuistraat in November 1867 and a double row of chestnut trees was planted along it. On the south side, the street ends at the Spui.

=== As a street ===
Among the many alleys and streets connecting the Nieuwezijds Voorburgwal and Achterburgwal was the Stilsteeg; it and Korte Gasthuismolensteed were widened in 1875 to create the Paleisstraat. Around 1895 the Huiszittensteeg and the Korte Huiszittensteeg were widened to create the Raadhuisstraat.

The first horsecar ran through the Spuistraat in 1877, from the Dam Square to the Leidseplein. It was replaced in 1903 by an electric streetcar, line 2, which ran to the Leidseplein by way of the Nieuwezijds Voorburgwal and Spui; in 1904 line 2 was added. The streetcar (electric tram) Amsterdam - Haarlem - Zandvoort (the Blue Tram) ran from 1904 to 1957 from the Raadhuisstraat through the southern end of the street, and from 1914 to 1957 it ended on the Spuistraat. From 1961 to 1974 a number of bus lines of the Gemeentelijk Vervoerbedrijf ended on the Spuistraat. These days, the street is part of the city loop that guides traffic through downtown. Attempts by locals to have that loop shifted to the (wider) Nieuwezijds Voorburgwal have failed.

== Notable buildings ==
- Spuistraat 12: Dominicus church, designed by Pierre Cuypers, built in 1886 on Spuistraat 12 / Korte Korsjespoortsteeg / Teerketelsteeg. Between 1845 and 1884 this was the location of the Roman Catholic clandestine church, designed by R. van Zoelen, the Dominicus Schuilkerk. Before that, there was another clandestine church, the "Stadhuys van Hoorn", built by the Dominican order in 1624.
- Spuistraat 111-123: the back of the Handelsvereniging Amsterdam, built in the style of the Amsterdamse School. The front of the building is in the style of the neorenaissance, on the Nieuwezijds Voorburgwal 162–170.
- Spuistraat 137–139, corner of Raadhuisstraat, is the backside of the Magna Plaza department store, formerly the main post office, built 1895–1899, designed by Cornelis Peters.
- Spuistraat 175: one side of the monumental building, behind the Royal Palace on the Dam, built around 1924 by royal architect Joseph Crouwel as the Rijkskantoorgebouw voor het Geld- en Telefoonbedrijf. It was turned into a supermarket in 2000, with offices on the upper floors.
- Spuistraat 172: corner of Paleisstra, a bank building designed in 1932 by Christiaan Posthumus Meyjes jr. for the N.V. Kasvereeniging.
- Spuistraat 210: Bungehuis, built in the 1930s by Adolf Daniël Nicolaas van Gendt and W.J. Klok, later used by the University of Amsterdam's Department of Humanities
- Spuistraat 216: the squat Vrankrijk. Opposite are the Tabakspanden, which had been mostly squatted from 1983 onwards. Slated for renovation (and luxury apartments), the squats were evicted in 2015.
- Spuistraat 134: P. C. Hoofthuis, built by Aldo van Eyck and Theo Bosch in 1984, also used by the University of Amsterdam's Department of Humanities.
- Spuistraat 274: bakery of D. C. Stähle, on the corner with the Raamsteeg, built in 1898 after a Jugendstil-design by Gerrit van Arkel.
- Spuistraat 297: Gerzon building, built in 1924 by A. Moen for the Gerzon Bros, a fashion retailer, now a hotel.

== Gallery ==
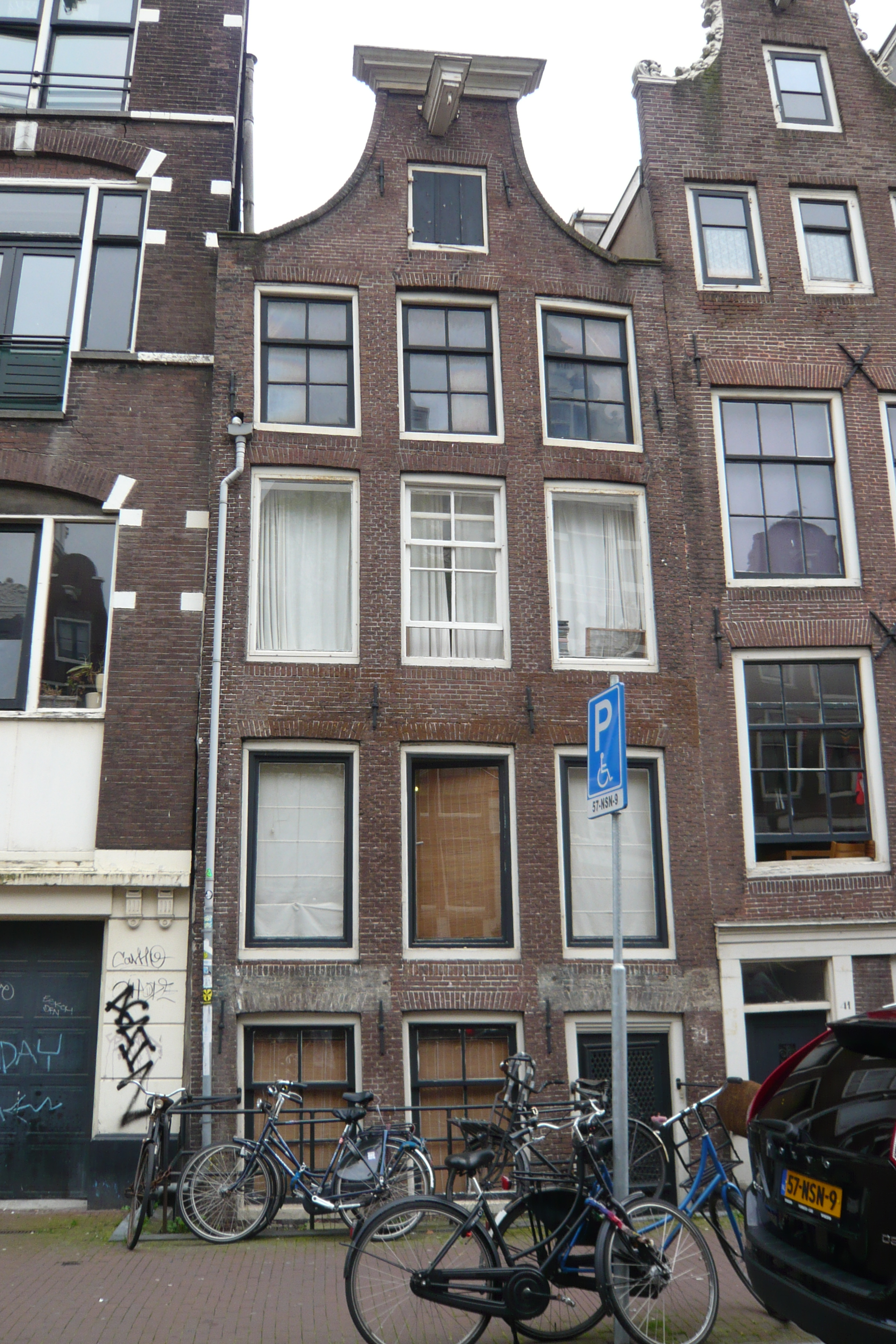
Rijksmonument Spuistraat 39

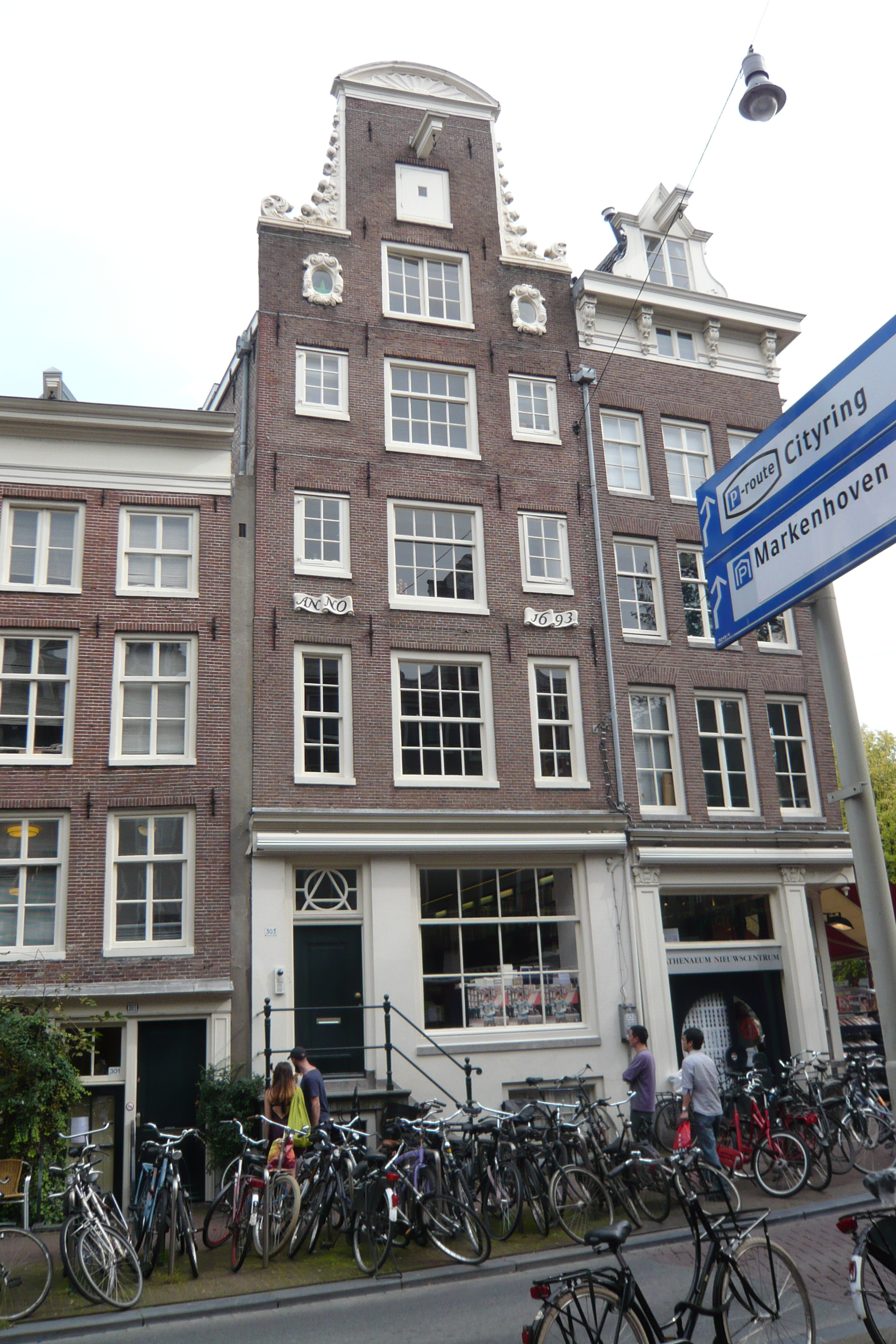
Rijksmonument Spuistraat 303

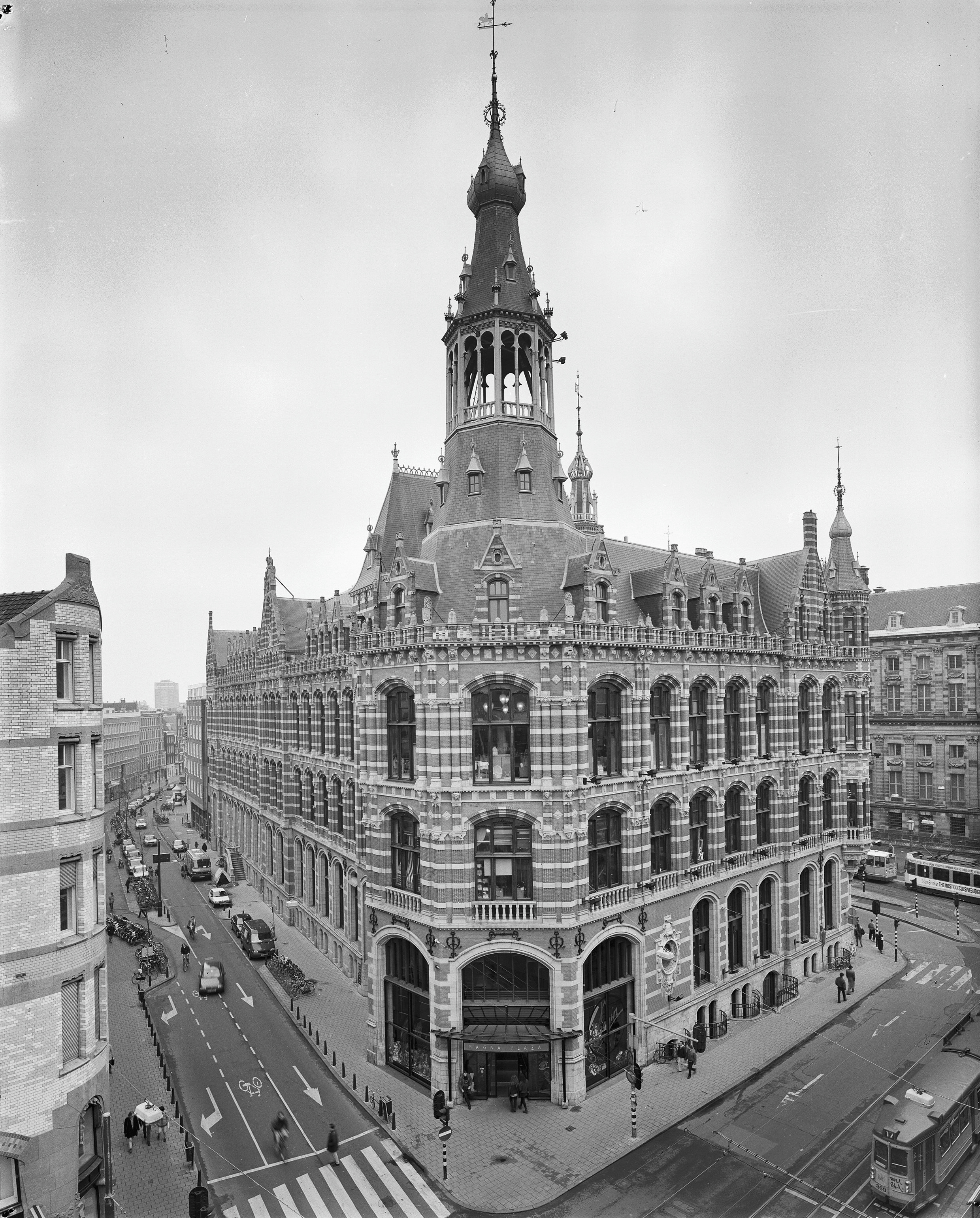
Former main post office, now Magna Plaza, corner of Spuistraat and Raadhuisstraat; March 1994

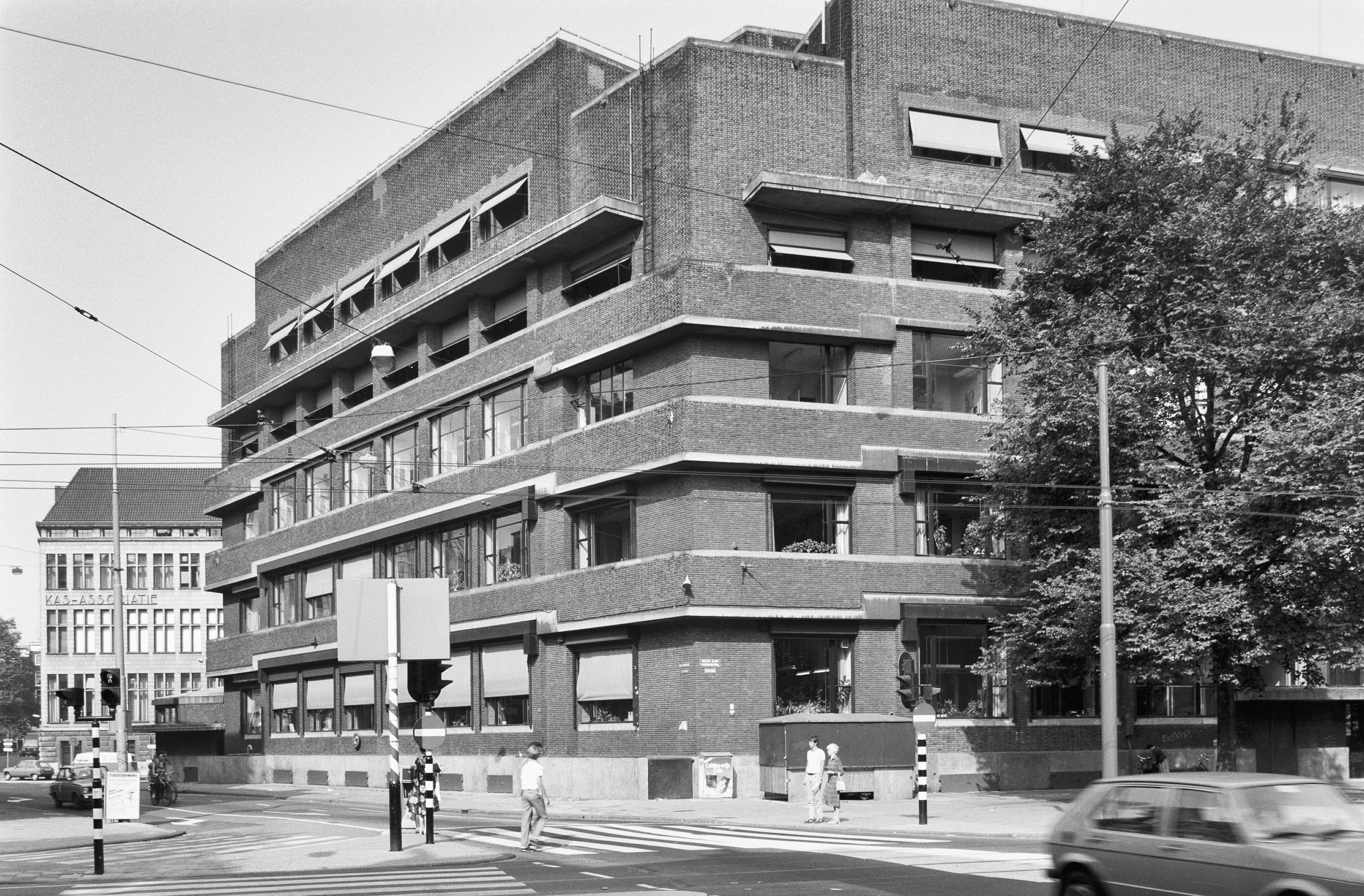
Spuistraat 175, Rijkskantoorgebouw voor het Geld- en Telefoonbedrijf; augustus 1983

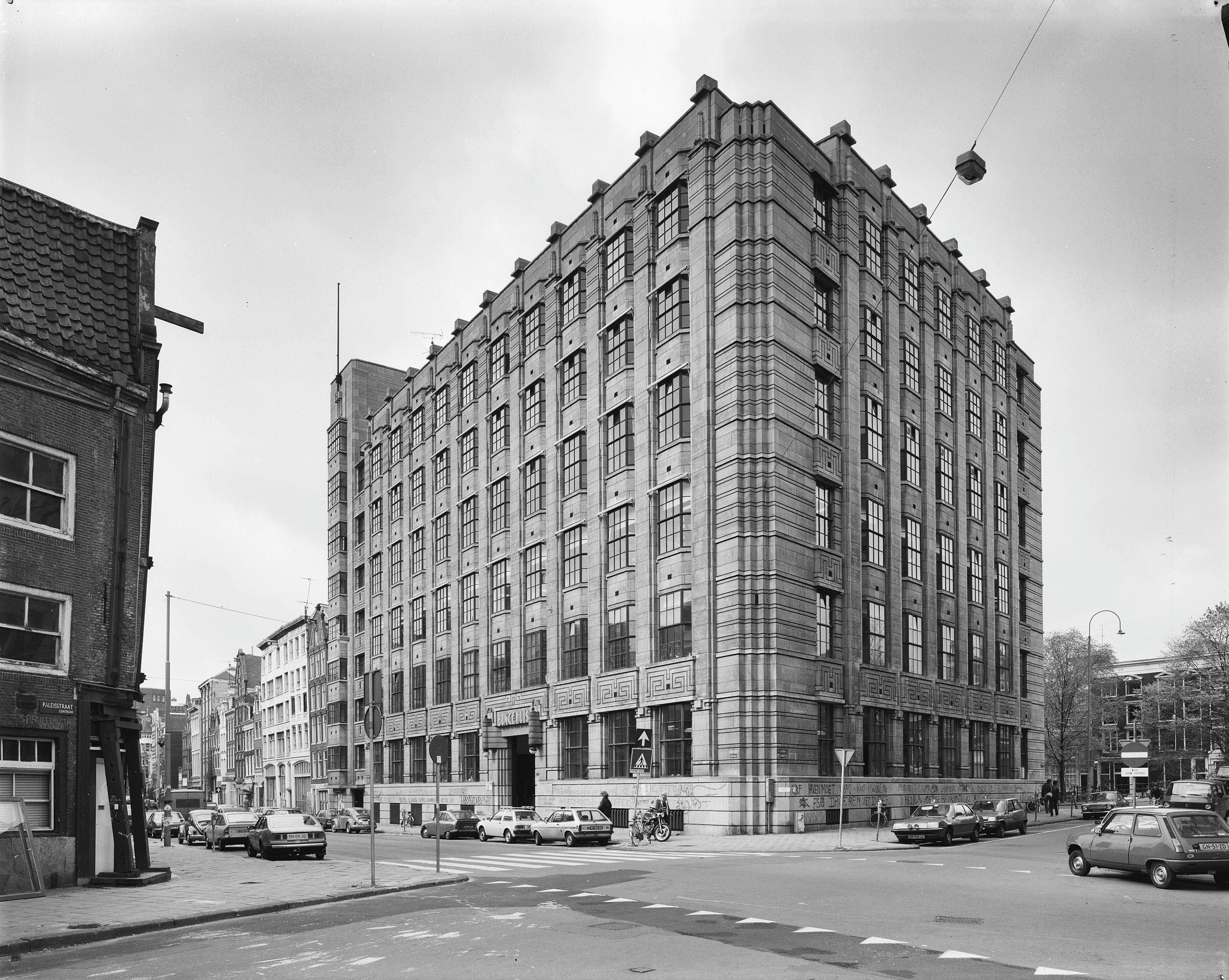
Spuistraat 220, front of Bungehuis, Department of Letters; October 1984

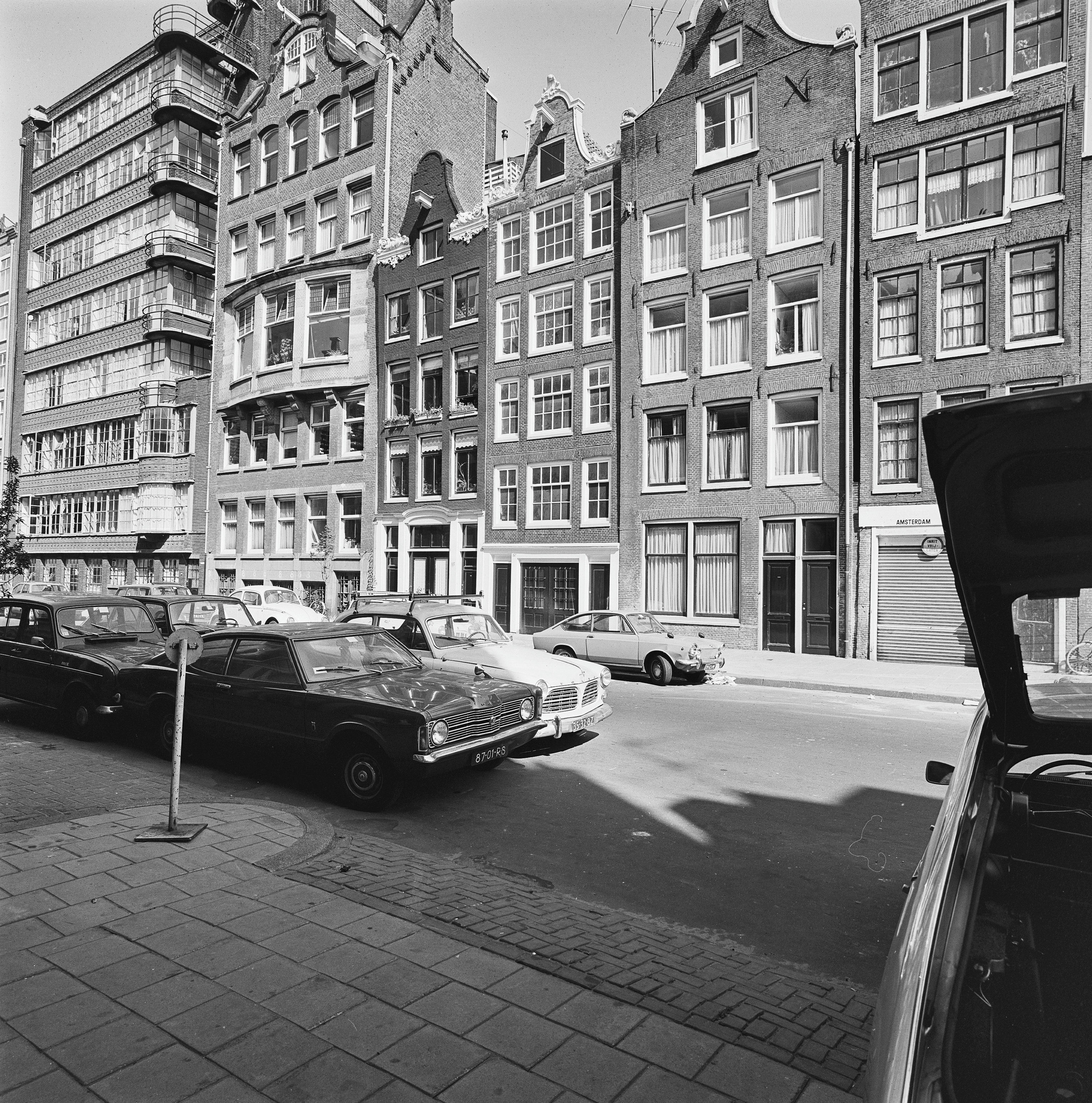
Spuistraat 85–87; April 1976

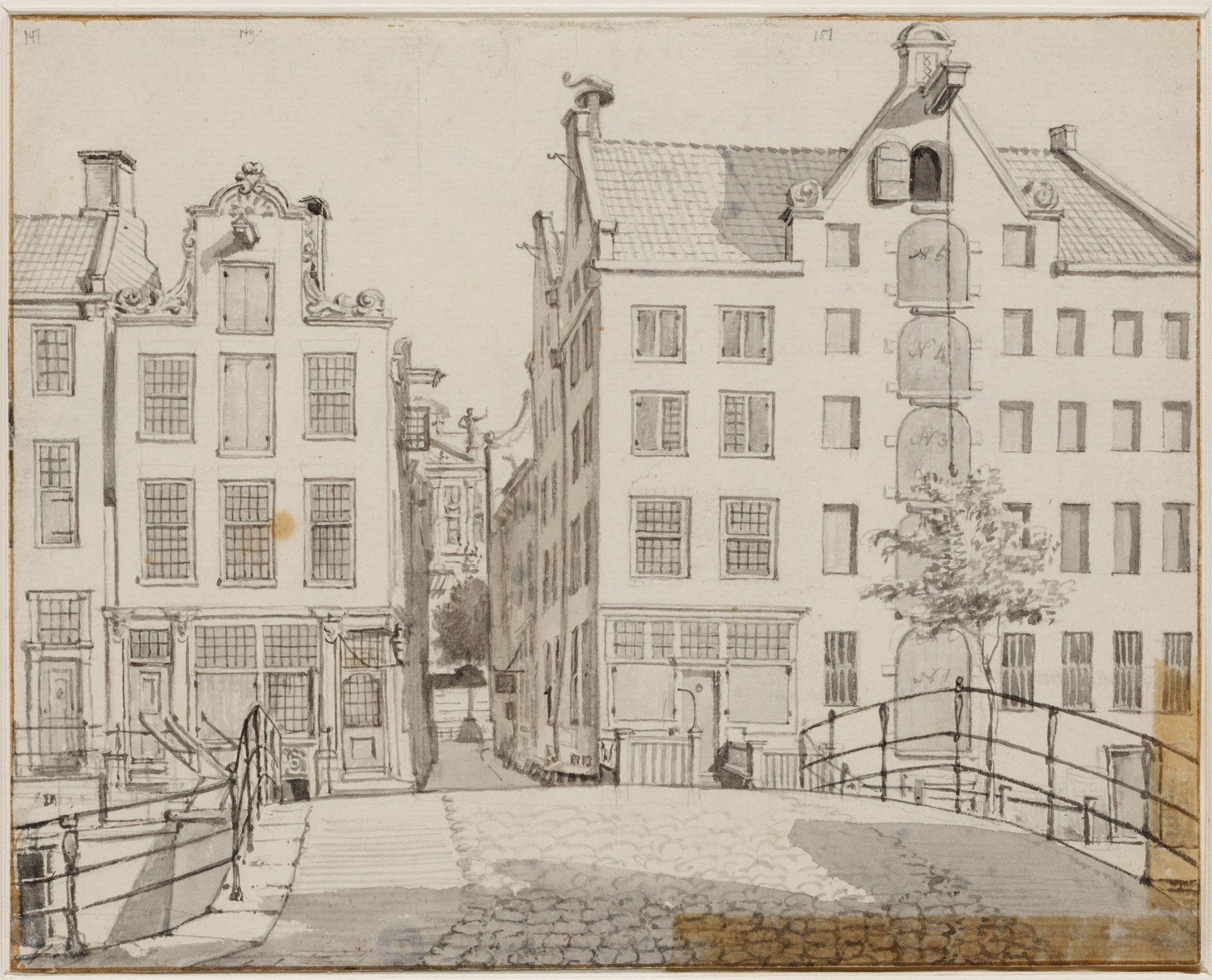
Nieuwezijds Achterburgwal, 147–151, with entrance to Huiszittensteeg. c. 1770. Gerrit Lamberts

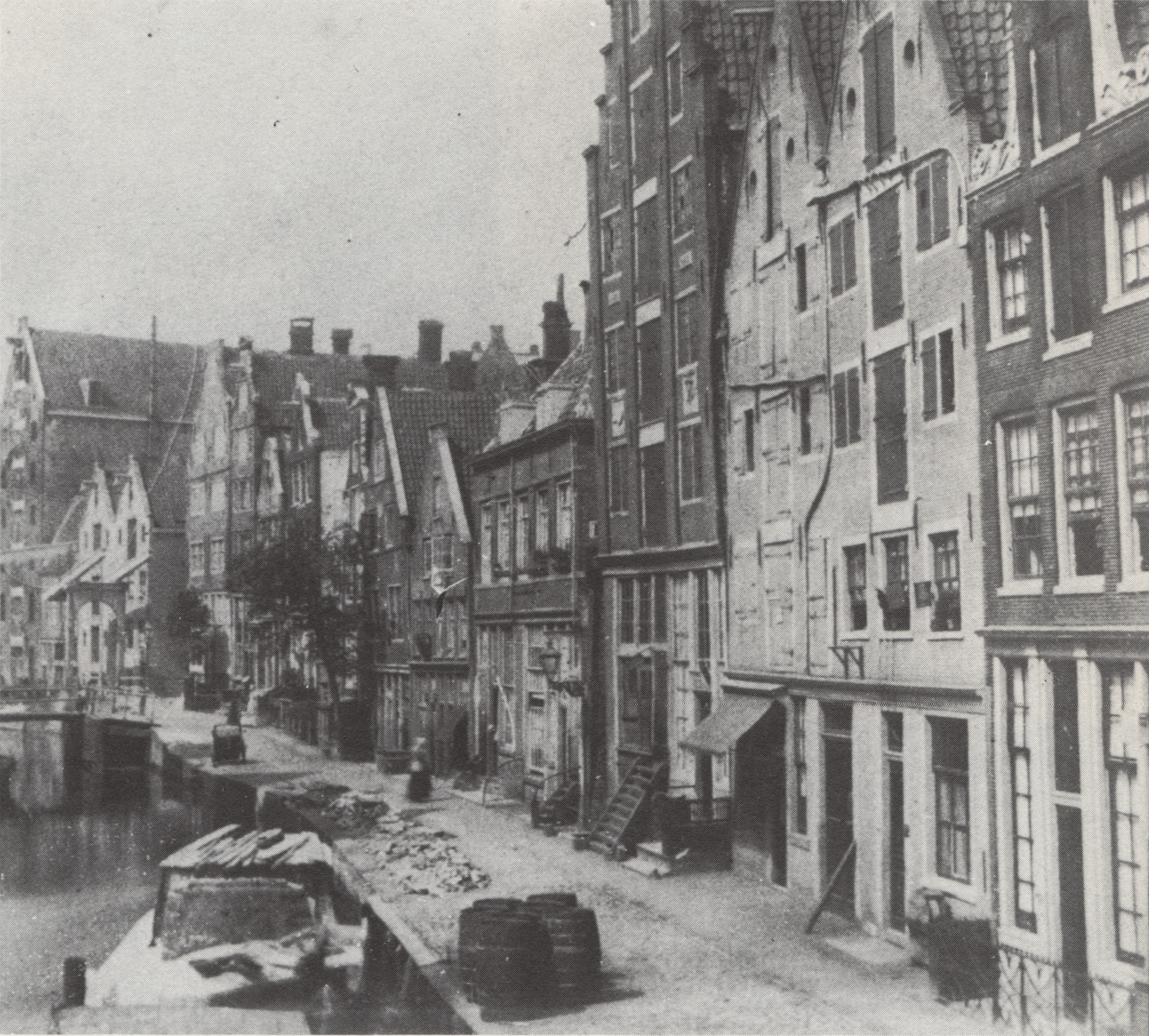
Nieuwe Zijds Achterburgwal, looking south, left bridge over Kattegat. Before 1900

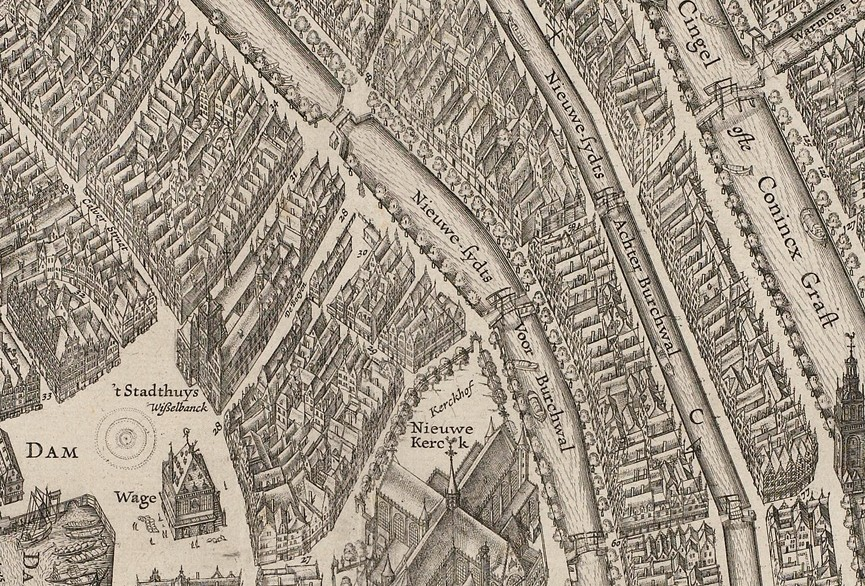
1625 map showing Dam Square, Nieuwezijds Voorburgwal, Nieuwezijds Achterburgwal and the Singel

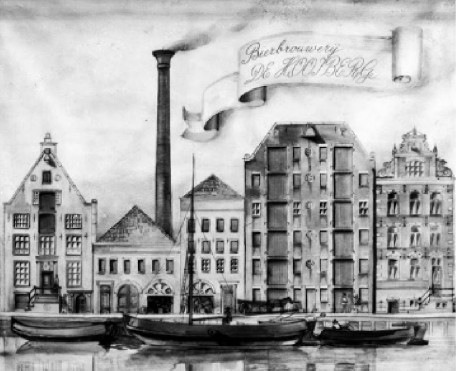
De Hooiberg brewery on Nieuwezijds Achterburgwal in 1864

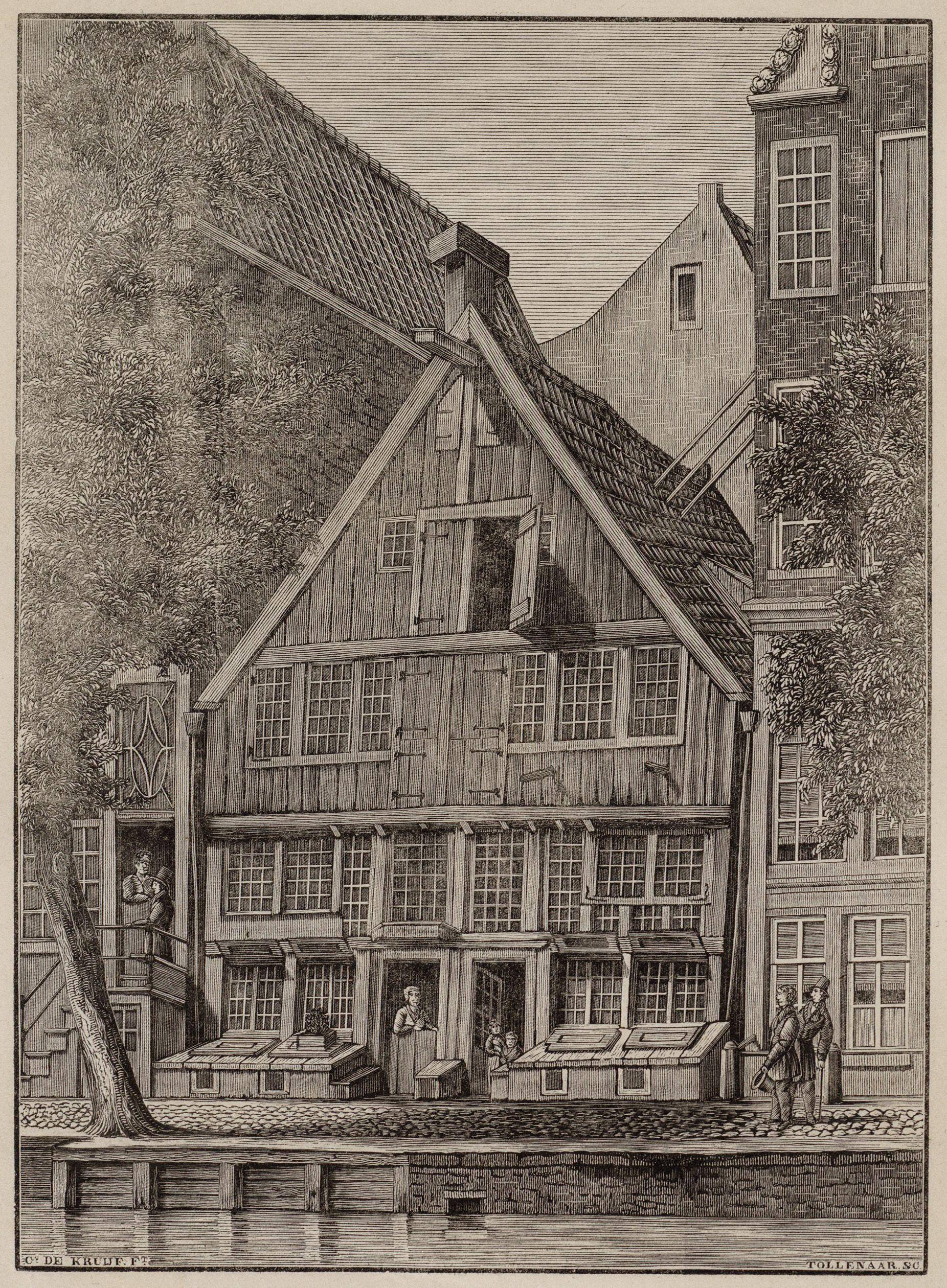
Vondel's home, Spuistraat 188, formerly Nieuwezijds Achterburgwal. Cornelis de Kruyff, c. 1800

== See also ==
- List of rijksmonumenten in the Spuistraat, Amsterdam

== Sources ==
- "400 jaar Amsterdamse grachten: Nieuwezijds Achterburgwal", De Echo, 16 April 2013
- Arthur der Weduwen (19 April 2017), Dutch and Flemish Newspapers of the Seventeenth Century (2 Vols.), BRILL, ISBN 978-90-04-34189-0
- Geert Mak (30 September 2010), Amsterdam: A brief life of the city, Random House, ISBN 978-1-4090-0085-3
- Gerrit_de_Broen (1737), Amsterdam
- Peter Paul de Baar (26 September 2018), "Stinksloot wordt Spuistraat", Ons Amsterdam
- Theo Bakker, het raadsel Donkere Sluis (PDF)
