= Hotel Die Port van Cleve =

Hotel in Amsterdam, Netherlands

Coordinates: 52.3741°N 4.8908°E

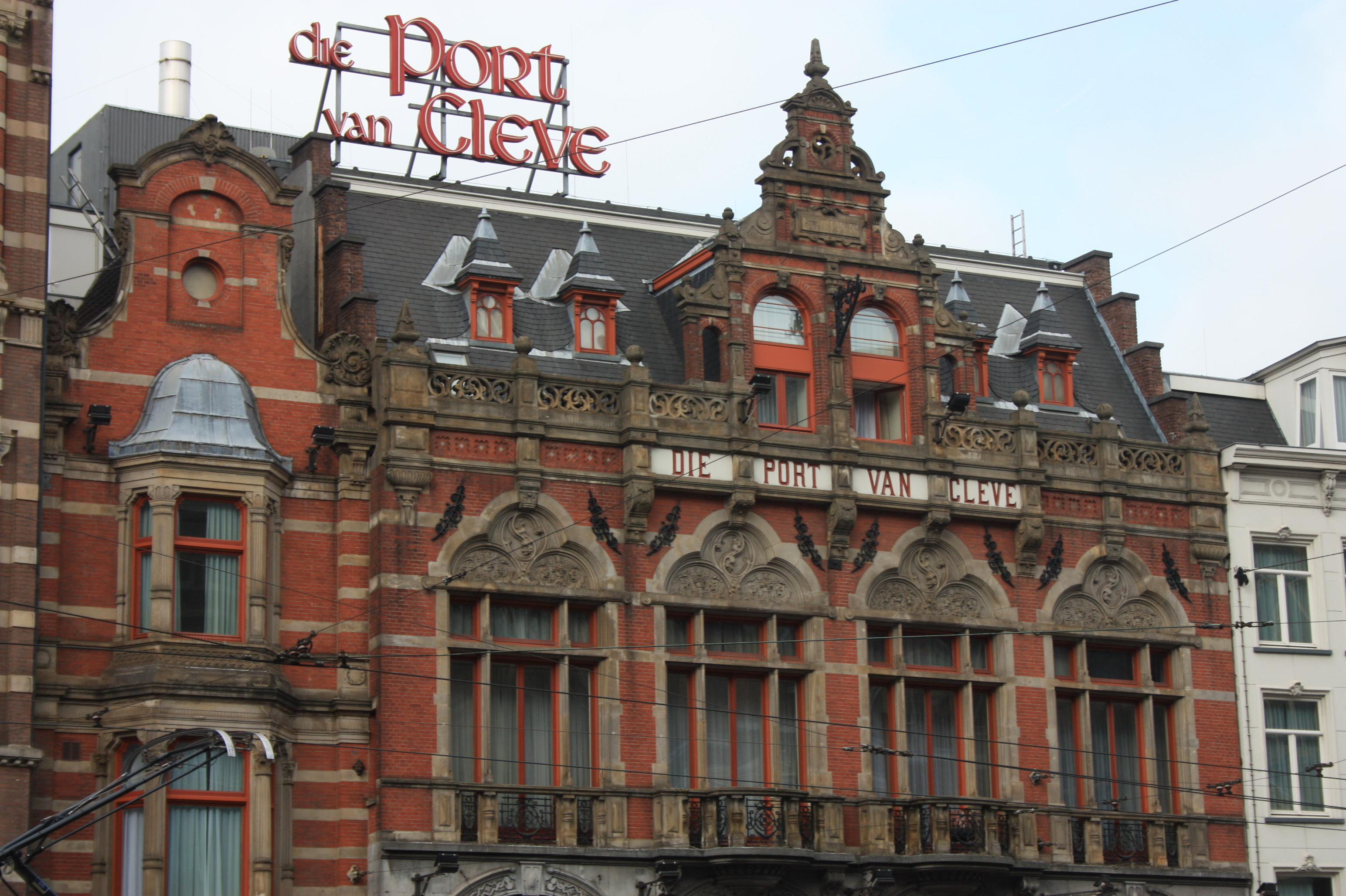
Hotel die Port van Cleve, Amsterdam

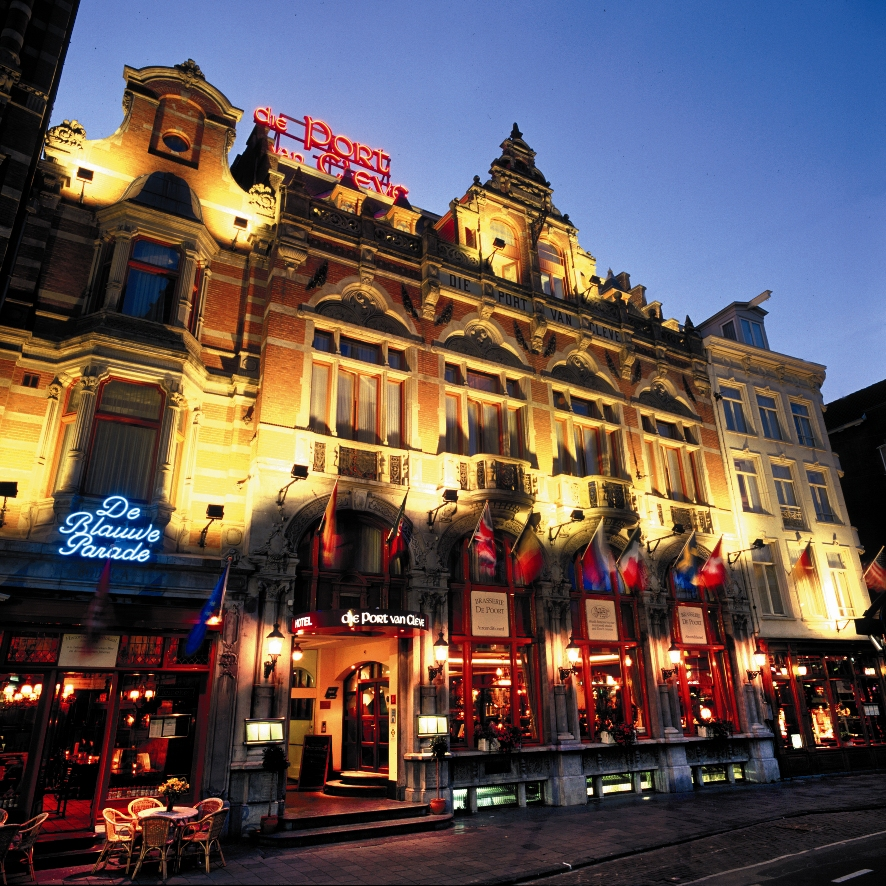
Monumental facade of Hotel Die Port van Cleve

Hotel Die Port van Cleve is a historical 4-star hotel on the Nieuwezijds Voorburgwal in Amsterdam. The hotel is situated in the centre of Amsterdam, immediately north of the Magna Plaza shopping centre, and west of the Royal Palace on the Dam Square.

The hotel offers 122 rooms, 1 meeting rooms The Brewery Club, restaurant Hulscher's renowned for the numbered steaks and authentic Bar-Bodega 'De Blauwe Parade' with a unique Delft Blue tile fresco from 1887.

== History ==
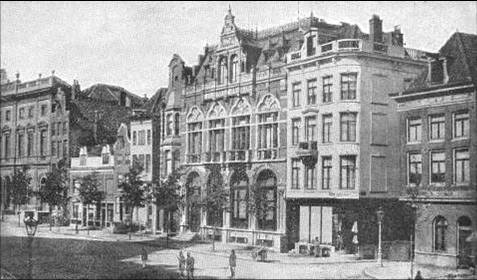
Historic picture of Hotel Die Port van Cleve & Nieuwezijds Voorburgwal

Hotel Die Port van Cleve owes its name to a plaque of 'Huys te Kleef', that was part of the building complex of brewery 'De Hooiberg'. The brewery was located here since 1592, when widow Weyntgen Elberts bought the building and established the brewery of her husband here. In the years that followed, the building was expanded between the Nieuwezijds Voor- and Achterburgwal.

Brewery 'De Hooiberg' was very successful and remained so until the 18th century. In 1863 the building complex was bought by Gerard Adriaan Heineken. Due to the filling of the canal and the name change of the Nieuwezijds Achterburgwal in Spuistraat, Heineken moved his brewery to its current location on the Stadhouderskade in Amsterdam.

=== Beerhouse 'Die Port van Cleve' ===
On the side of the Achterburgwal only the bottling room of the brewery remained in operation. For the buildings on the Nieuwezijds Voorburgwal, Heineken contracted the brothers G.J. and M.J. Hulscher to convert them into a beerhouse. During the renovations the Hulscher brothers found a memorial stone engraved with the text 'Die Port van Cleve', which also became the name for the establishment. On 5 September 1870 beerhouse Die Port van Cleve opened its doors.

=== Eating-house 'De Poort' ===
In 1874 the beerhouse expanded with a restaurant, eating-house 'De Poort', where typical Dutch dishes were served and the now still well-known numbered steaks. The service in 'De Poort' was renowned, just as 'the echo’ of de Poort. The eating-house 'De Poort' system, meant to serve the best possible food as fast as possible. The speed of the order was very important. After ordering, the waiters, of whom many could not read and write, continuously shouted their orders as loud as possible. The waiter behind the buffet, known as 'the echo', repeated these orders to the kitchen equally loud and preferably with the same intonation without missing a word. After the preparation in the kitchen, the whole order was echoed back to the restaurant.

In 1879 'De Poort' was the first building that was completely electrically lit.

=== Bodega 'De Blauwe Parade' ===
In 1888 the building was renovated. The façade was completely renovated in the Dutch neo-Renaissance style, with sandstone, brick and high windows. This architectural design came from Amsterdam architect Isaac Gosschalk (1838–1907). Gosschalk was also famous for the design of the Westergas fabriek and the Central Station of Groningen. The building was also expanded with the house on the Nieuwezijds Voorburgwal 180, 'De Zeven Keurvorsten'. On 3 juli 1888 a bodega was opened, Bodega 'De Blauwe Parade', decorated with a typical old-Dutch interior and a unique Delft Blue tile fresco of approximately 26 metres. The fresco, designed by the managing director of the Museum Lambert van Meerten, A. Le Comte, depicts a parade of children, simulating the historical triumphs from the Golden Age in honor of the Emperor Maximilian. The emperor is recognizable by his crown and the three crosses on his chest. These days the crosses are still visible in the Amsterdam city sign. They stand for heroism, determination and mercifulness. This tile fresco was produced in 1887 by the well known Delft stoneware factory ‘De Koninklijke Porceleyne Fles’.

=== Aeon Plaza Hotels ===
In 1996, Hotel Die Port van Cleve was purchased by its current owners, the shareholders of Aeon Plaza Hotels. Since then the building has undergone several structural changes. The building still has numerous authentic features. The unique façade of this historic hotel has remained unchanged and has obtained a monumental status. As well as the unique interior of Bar-Bodega 'De Blauwe Parade', with its Delft blue tile fresco.

Around the same period, a multi-year renovation of the hotel took place, completed in 2025 to coincide with the celebration of its 155th anniversary. For the renovation, eight historical stories about 'De Poort' were selected and incorporated into the design of the hotel rooms.

=== Bouillon d'Amsterdam ===
Since 1 March 2026, Bouillon d'Amsterdam has occupied space in Hotel Die Port van Cleve. The restaurant was founded by Michiel van der Eerde, Nick van der Meer, Tom de Rooij and Jasper Albers, replacing restaurant Hulscher's, which had operated on the site since 2018. The concept is based on the tradition of 19th-century Parisian bouillon restaurants. The traditional numbered steak remains on the menu, served as steak frites. Bar-Bodega De Blauwe Parade has since also been operated by the same hospitality group, as a cocktail bar led by Milos Stanisic. The bar's historic appearance has been preserved, including the Delft Blue tile frieze from 1887. Bouillon d'Amsterdam proved an immediate success, drawing around 60,000 guests in its first four months. Just six weeks after opening, the founders announced a second location in Amsterdam-Zuid, which opened in late June 2026.

== Sources ==
- Spies, P., K. Kleijn e.a., Het Grachtenboek II (SBV, Den Haag 1992) -
- Ons Amsterdam (Januari 2004)
- Diverse documentation from the Bureau Monumenten & Archeologie Gemeente Amsterdam
- Misset Horeca (Hulscher's since 2018): Restaurant Hulscher's (her)schrijft geschiedenis
- Tasty Trails (founders, opening, De Blauwe Parade): Bouillon d’Amsterdam brengt Parijse traditie naar Amsterdam
- I amsterdam (preservation of the historic interior, Delft tile frieze, numbered steak): https://www.iamsterdam.com/en/whats-on/calendar/accomodations/all-accomodations/hotel-die-port-van-…
- Dieportvancleve.com (numbered steak as steak frites): https://www.dieportvancleve.com/bouillon-d-amsterdam
- Entree Magazine (60,000 guests, second location): https://www.entreemagazine.nl/ondernemen/bouillon-damsterdam-geen-hype-maar-een-nieuwe-restaurantst…
- Missethoreca (second location, after one and a half months): Bouillon d'Amsterdam opent tweede vestiging
