= Vrankrijk =

Communal living space in Amsterdam

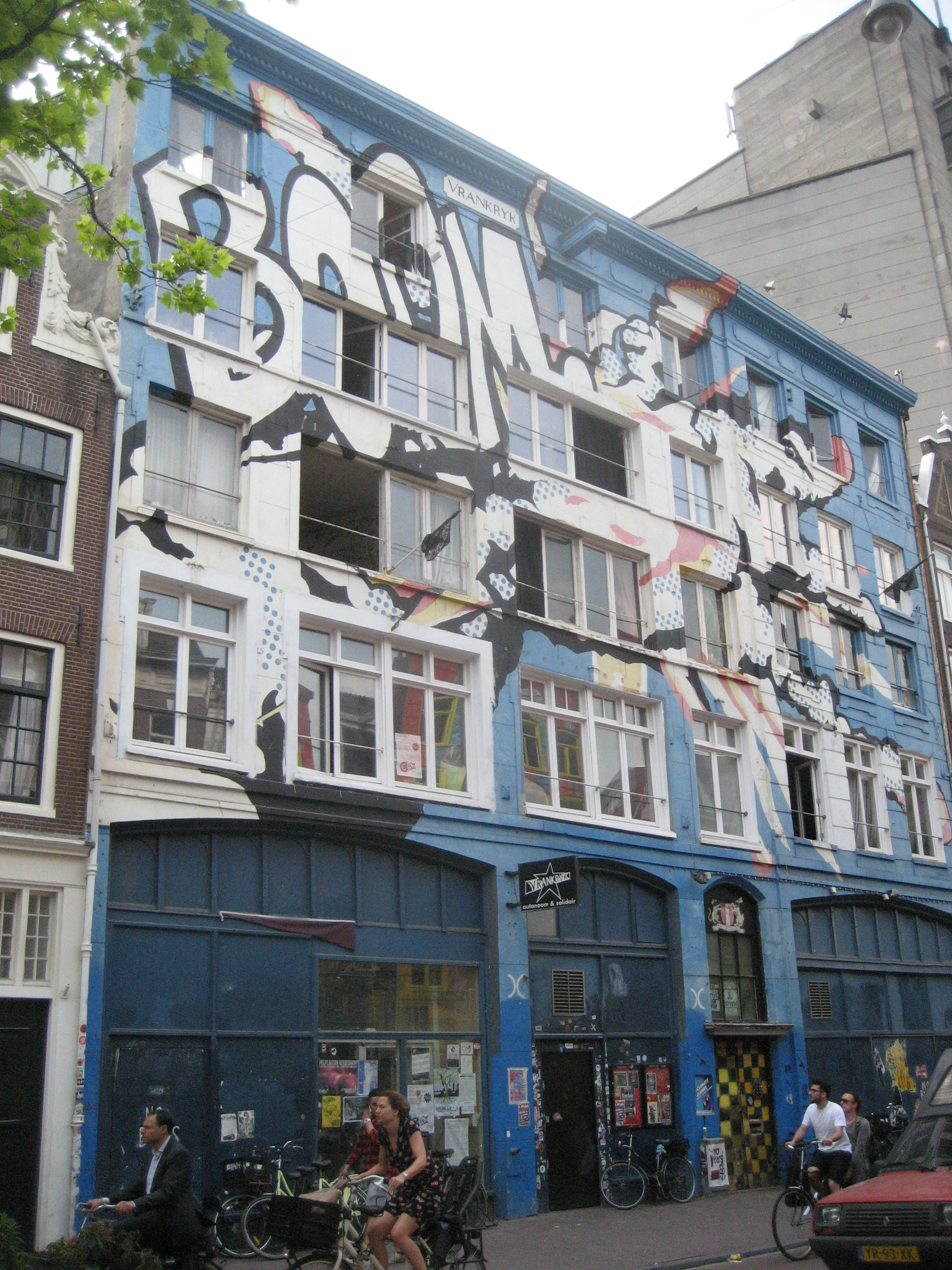
- Vrankrijk in 2015

General information
- Location: Spuistraat 216, Amsterdam, Netherlands
- Coordinates: 52.371667°N 4.889167°E
- Completed: 1875
- Opened: 1982 (squatted)

Website
- vrankrijk.org

Vrankrijk is a legalised squat and self-managed social centre on the Spuistraat in central Amsterdam. There is an events space on the ground floor and above it a separate housing group.

== History ==
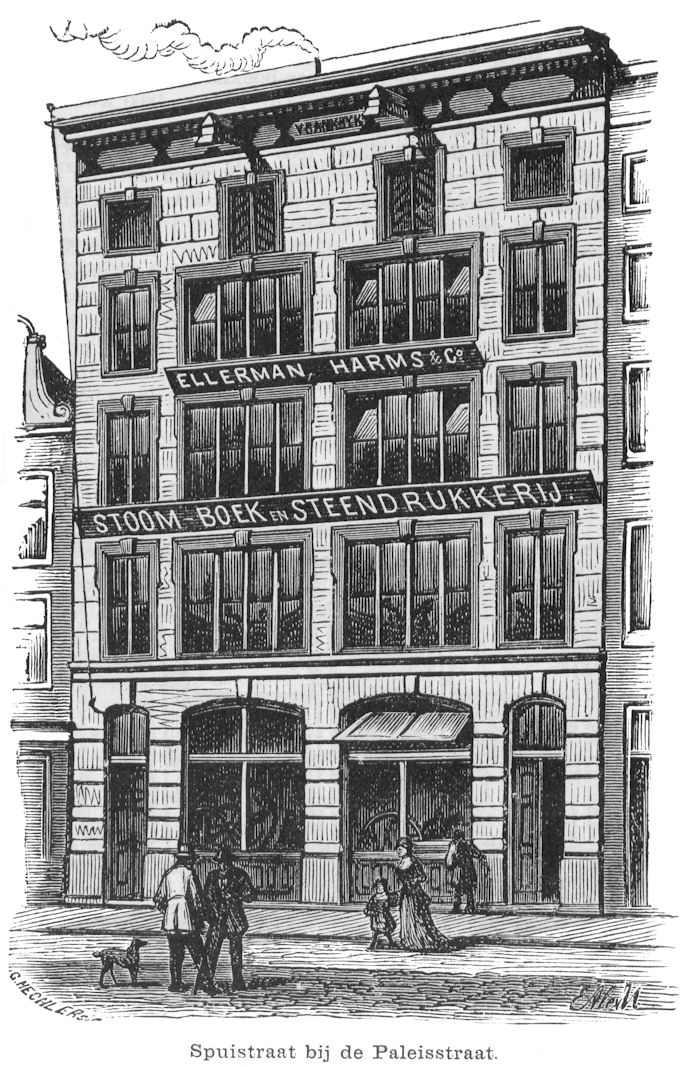
Vrankrijk as a printers in 1880

The building was constructed in 1875. It was called Vrankrijk (Frankrijk means 'France' in Dutch) from the very beginning. After first being a woodworking shop, it became a printers. During World War II it was used by Marten Toonder and others to print fake documents for the resistance.

== Occupation ==
Vrankrijk was squatted in November 1982 in order to stop its demolition. It had stood empty for 7 years and was in a very bad state. It was repaired by the occupiers and became a central meeting space for the Amsterdam squatters movement, still thriving after the coronation and Vondelstraat riots of 1980.

In 1991, the owner of the building at first threatened to evict the squatters and then offered to sell them the building. The first offer was rejected but after the owner's workplace was occupied by 50 people, he stated he would sell the building if certain conditions were met.

== Uses ==
Since 1984, the groundfloor functions as a non-commercial events space. Many groups have organised benefits and infonights there. The venue, which is separate to the living spaces above it, remains squatted. In the 2010s, Vrankrijk hosts mainly punk and queer parties. The building itself is well known in Amsterdam for its colourful facade and anarchist slogans beside the door.

The German NGO Sea-Watch, which supports the rescue of migrants in the Mediterranean, uses Vrankrijk as its official location.

In September 2008, an incident occurred late at night in which two people were thrown out of the bar. When they tried to re-enter, they were aggressive and caused a fight. One of the two, a squatter nicknamed Yoghurt, ended up unconscious and received serious injuries. In consequence Mayor of Amsterdam Job Cohen closed the bar. In 2009, two people were sentenced to two years in jail (8 months suspended) for attacking Yoghurt with a piece of scaffolding pipe. A third person was not punished, since the court decided he had hit Yoghurt but his violence was proportionate.

The bar reopened in 2012, run by a new collective (Stichting Tweeënveertig). Cohen's successor, Eberhard van der Laan, accepted this under the condition that all the people who were involved in the previous incident were excluded and that the collective made a business plan.

== European Council protests ==
The 1997 European Council meeting occurred in Amsterdam on 16 and 17 June, resulting in the Treaty of Amsterdam. On Sunday 15 June, a large police operation targeted Vrankrijk, which was a base for the planned counter-demonstrations. Police filmed everyone entering and leaving the building. Some people were arrested and charged with membership of a criminal organisation. Later on, a group of 350 people left Vrankrijk, heading to the police station to support the arrestees. The entire group was arrested and charged with the same crime, making it the largest mass arrest in the Netherlands since 1966. Vrankrijk itself was not raided. A judge was later highly critical of the actions of the police.

== Juanra ==
Juan Ramón Rodrìguez Fernández was arrested on January 17, 2001, in an Amsterdam supermarket by Dutch police acting on a Eurojust request from the Spanish Guardia Civil related to investigations concerning the Basque group ETA. Fernández, known as Juanra, was the singer of the Barcelona hardcore band KOP. As a result, the police raided Vrankrijk with 200 officers, checking all 14 bedrooms despite only having a warrant to search where Fernández had been staying.

== See also ==
- Anarchism in the Netherlands
