= Raadhuisstraat =

Street in Amsterdam, the Netherlands

Coordinates: 52°22′23″N 4°53′16″E

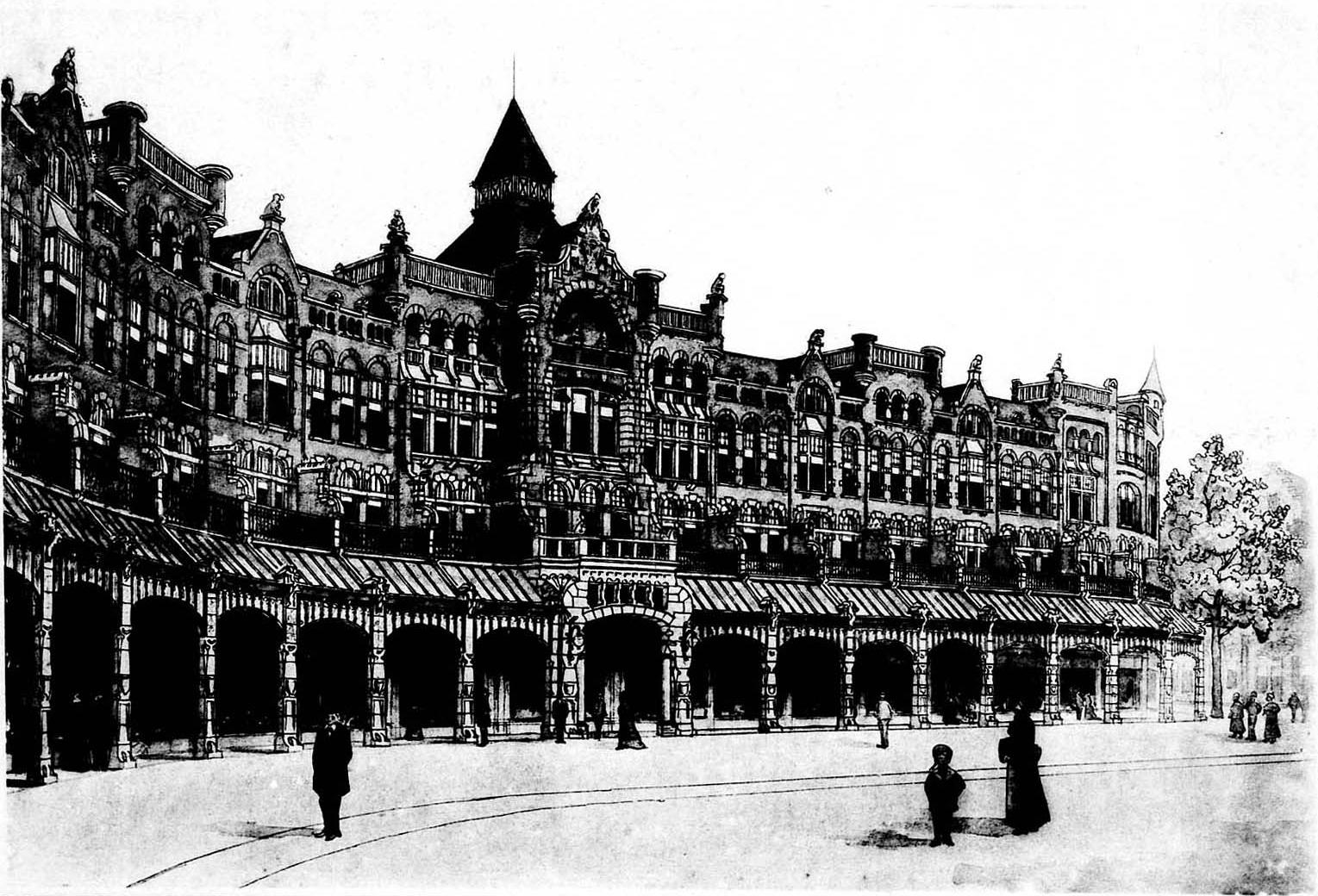
The street in 1898

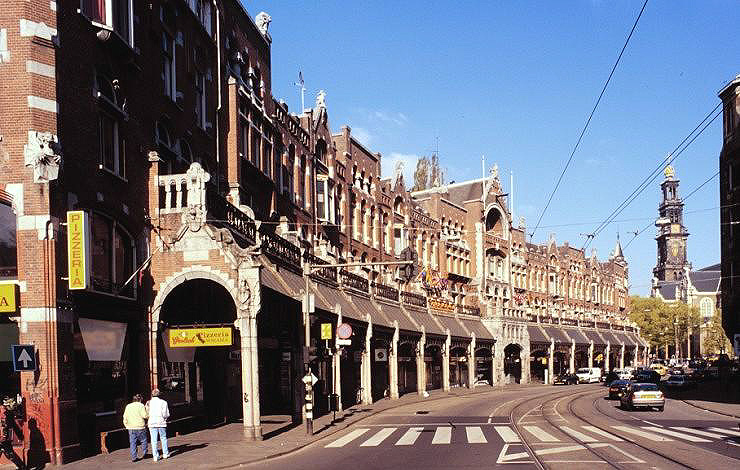

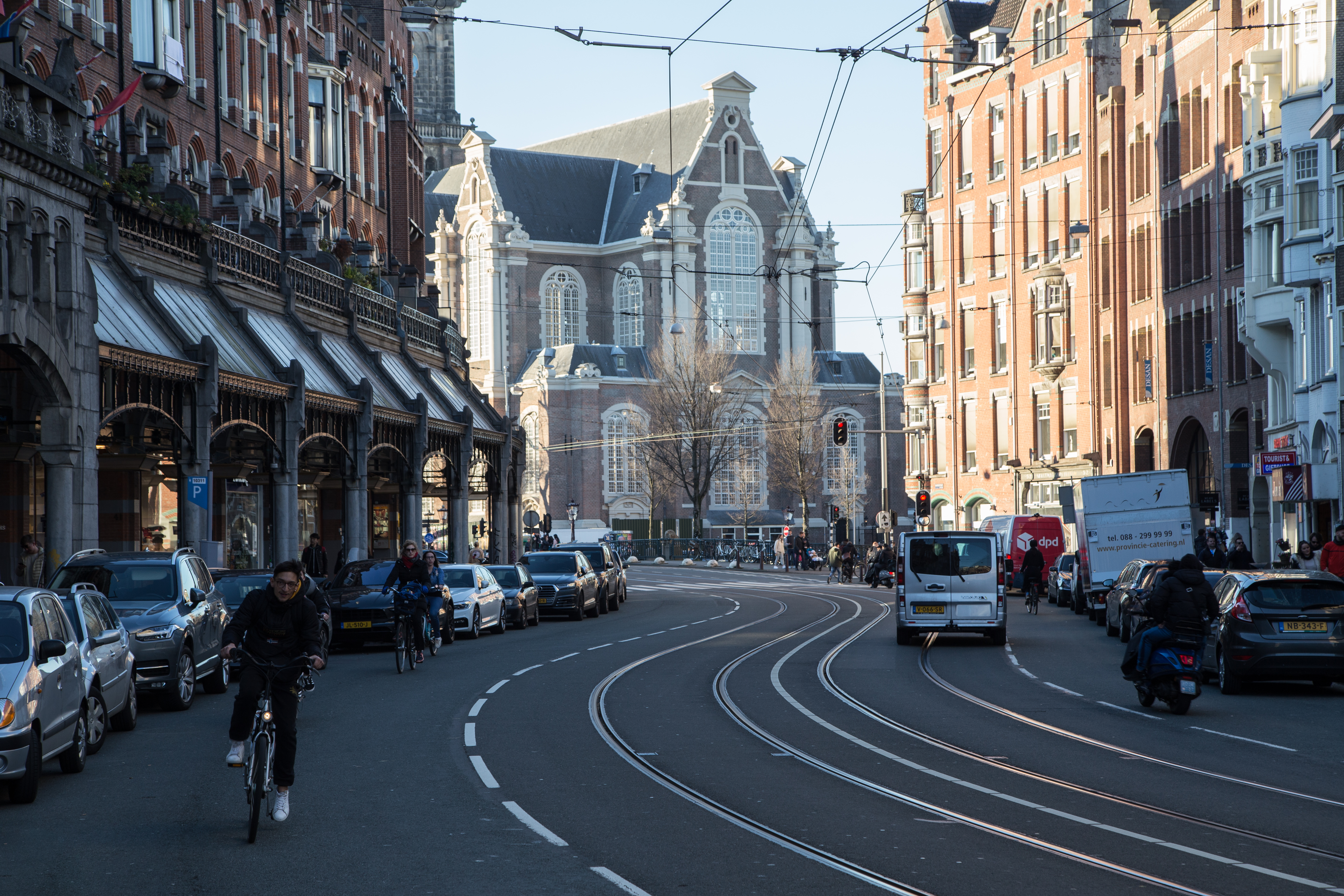
Raadhuisstraat in 2019

Raadhuisstraat is a street in Downtown Amsterdam, in the Netherlands. It is located between Nieuwezijds Voorburgwal and Prinsengracht. The street is named after the former City Hall or Town Hall, now the Royal Palace and it contains the gallery. It is the main thoroughfare into Old Centre.

Raadhuisstraat was built in 1895. Streets off of Raadhuisstraat are named after the many tanneries that used to be in the area. The street is noted for its shopping, a shopping area called the "Nine Streets," where vendors sell goods varying from handmade chocolates, high end personal goods and home decorum. A tramline was later introduced.

== Gallery ==
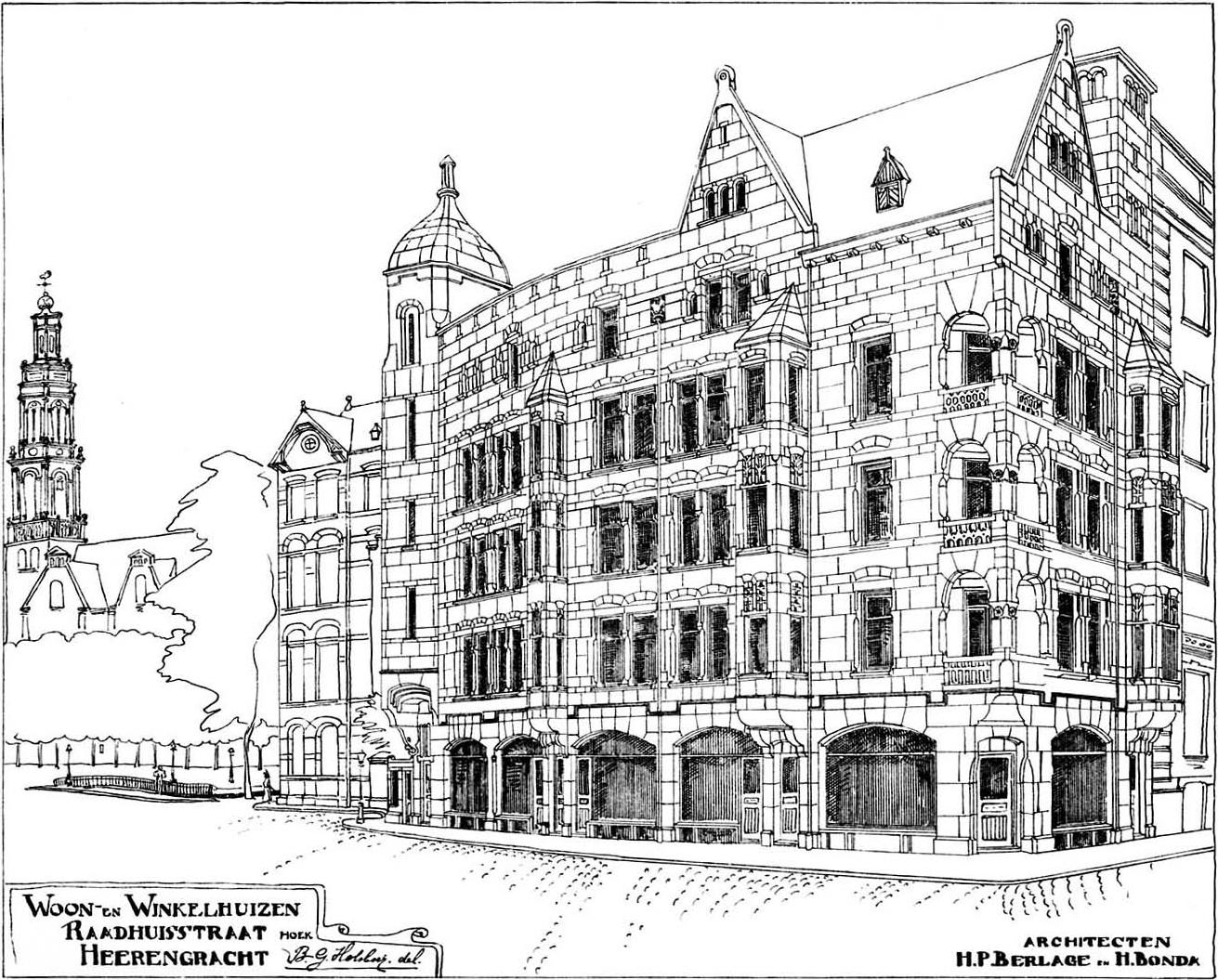
Houses on Raadhuisstraat designed by H.P. Berlage and H. Bonda.

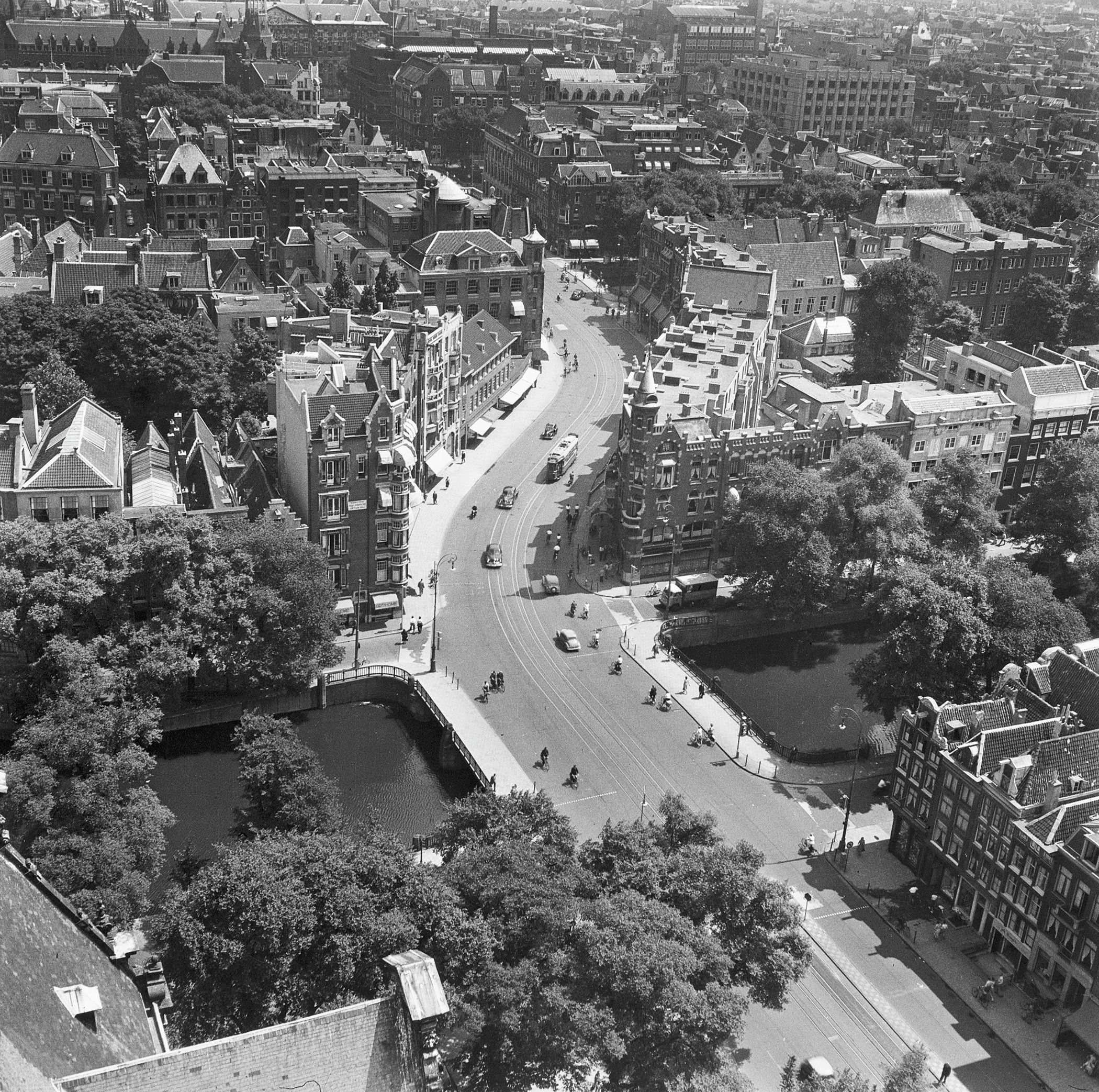
Overview from the Westertoren over Raadhuisstraat towards the southeast; 1954.

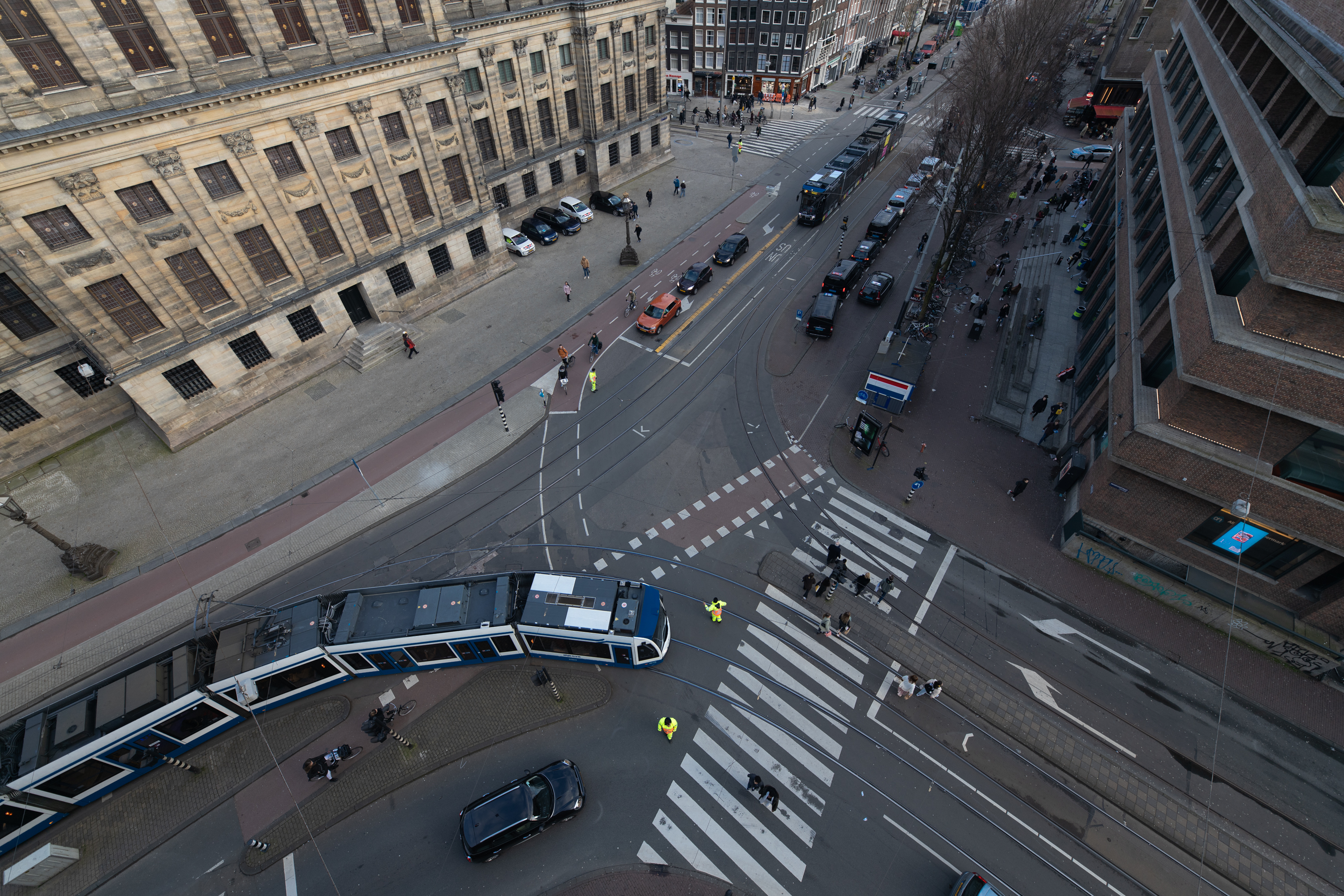
Intersection with Nieuwezijds Voorburgwal.

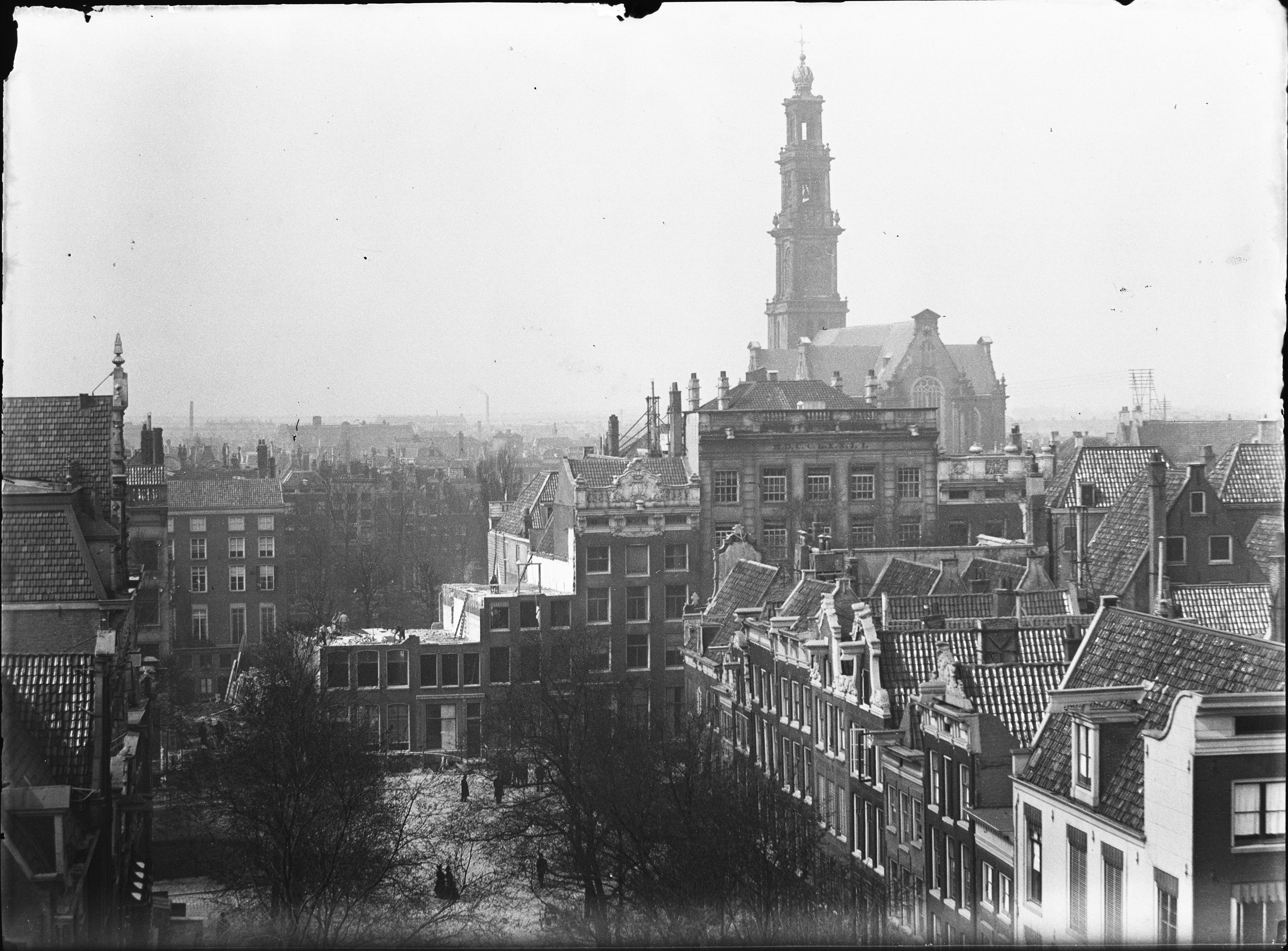
The demolition of houses on Herengracht for the construction of Raadhuisstraat (photo by Jacob Olie, April 1896). In the foreground, the filled-in Warmoesgracht.
