= Magna Plaza =

National monument in Amsterdam, Netherlands

Coordinates: 52.3736°N 4.8903°E

Magna Plaza, former Amsterdam Main Post Office building
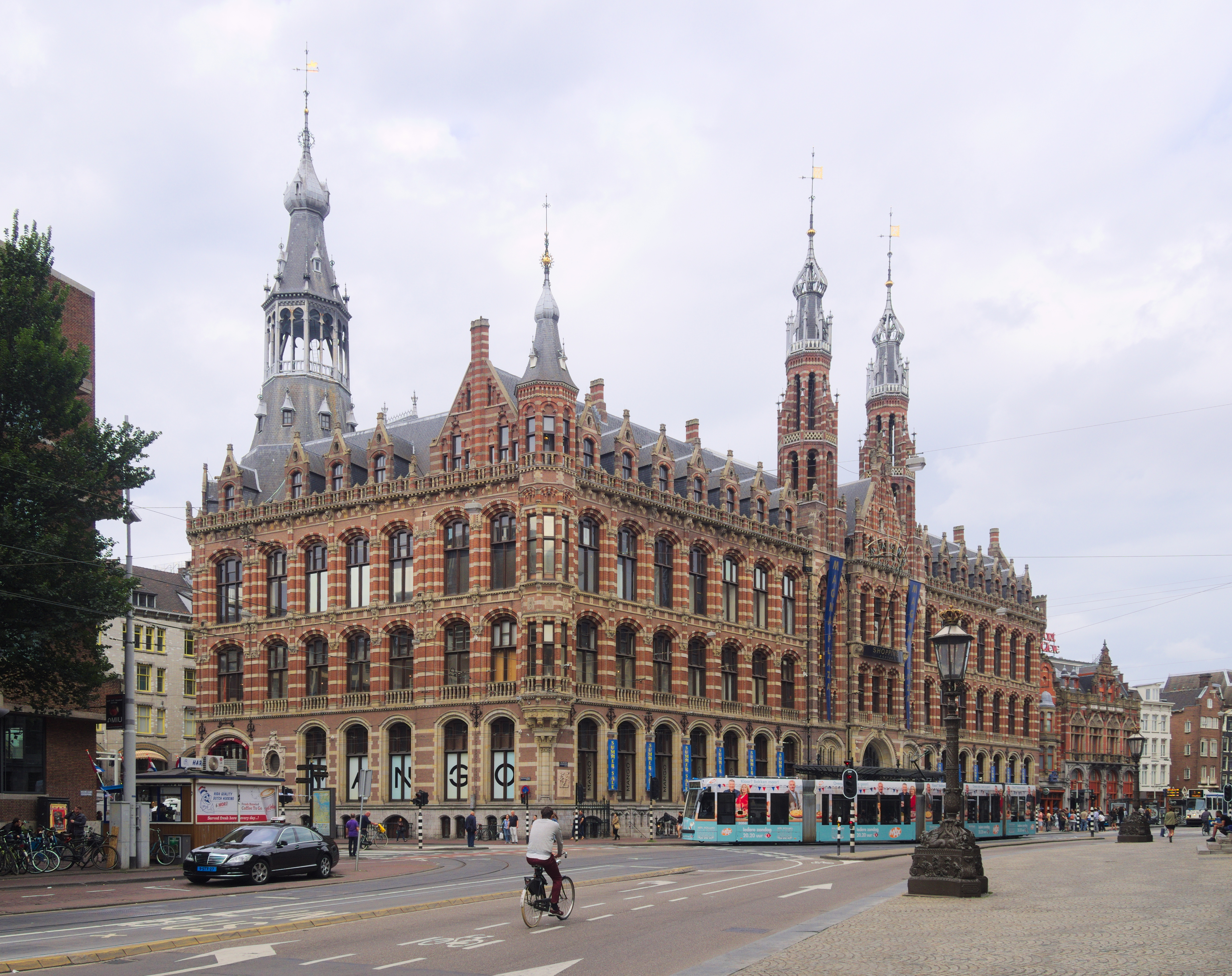
- The old Main Post Office Amsterdam, later Magna Plaza, viewed from the South, 2016.
- Interactive map of the Magna Plaza, former Amsterdam Main Post Office building area

General information
- Location: Nieuwezijds Voorburgwal 182, 1012 SJ Amsterdam. Corner Raadhuisstraat.
- Year built: 1895-1899

Technical details
- Floor area: 5,589 m² basement, ground floor, 1st and 2nd floor. The top floor 1,420 m² office space

Design and construction
- Architect: Cornelis Hendrik Peters (1847-1932)

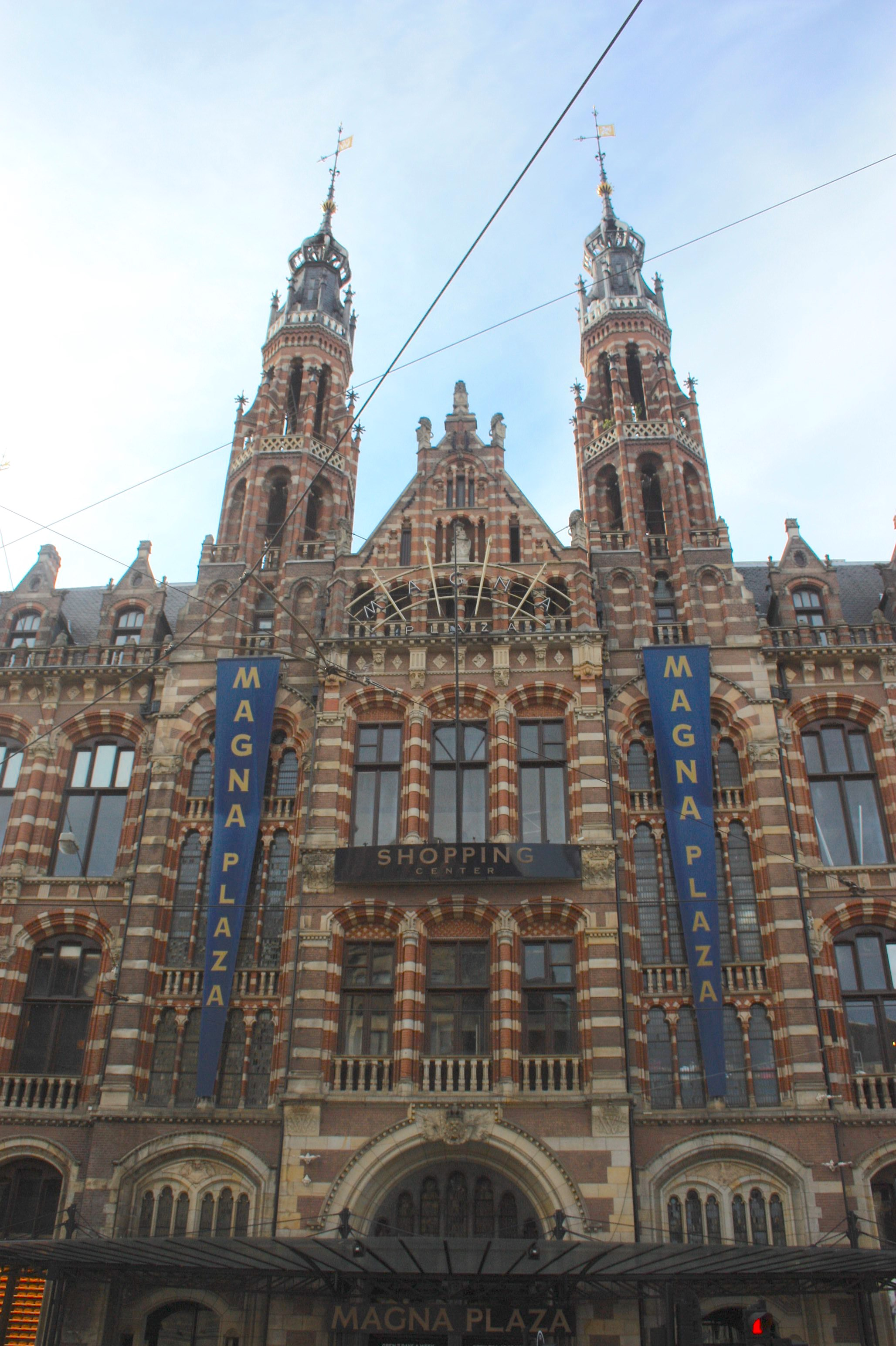
Entrance and central tower, Magna Plaza, Amsterdam, 2018.

The former Amsterdam Main Post Office, now the Magna Plaza shopping centre, is a monumental building located at Nieuwezijds Voorburgwal 182 in Amsterdam, Netherlands. It was built in 1895–1899 in neo-Gothic and neo-Renaissance style. The building has been a rijksmonument (Dutch national monument) since 9 July 1974, and is part of the Top 100 Dutch heritage sites.

== Construction ==
The Amsterdam Post Office was built in the period 1895–1899, designed by Cornelis Peters (Cornelis Hendrik Peters). It replaced the Royal Post Office of 1854, which was designed by Frederik Willem Conrad (1800-1870) and Cornelis Outshoorn, and served as a gallery shortly before being taken down in 1897.

== Exterior ==
The exterior is heavily decorated with polychromatic brick with details in dressed stone, including framing for all windows and doors. Across the roof edges are a large number of dormers, each with their own crow-stepped gable. Due to the pear shaped crowns on top of the towers the building is colloquially named ‘Perenburg’ (English: pearburg).

== Interior ==
The building's interior consists of a central hall with galleries on two upper floors, surrounded by arcades and crowned by a sunroof. The public function of the building was limited to the ground floor, while the rest of the building was only accessible to personnel of the PTT, then the national post, telegraph and telephone agency. In 1987, the PTT announced that it intended to vacate the building and it was sold the next year for 7.5 million guilders (about 3.2 million euro) to Larmag, a Swedish real estate developer, who intended to repurpose the building as a luxury shopping centre. Maintaining and optimally using the monumental building was a main criterion. The construction started in February 1991. The exterior work was mostly limited to cleaning, repair and restoration of the facades. The interior of the building was completely rebuilt, maintaining the carrying structures and decorative elements.

== Renovation and shopping mall ==
Unexpected technical problems delayed the work; the building's foundation had to be replaced, and several of the beams were found to be hollow. The floors of the new mall were connected by escalators and elevators. The existing stairways were maintained, two as emergency stairways, and one as a public stairway. Office spaces were created in the attic. The renovation was led by H.J.M. (Hans) Ruijssenaars. The Magna Plaza shopping centre, named after Larmag's CEO Lars-Erik Magnusson, was finally opened to the public on August 17, 1992.

In 2016, DPM Group sold Magna Plaza to institutional investors from Europe and Israel with a rumoured purchase price of around 63.5 million euro.

The gross leasable retail area is 5,589 square metres (60,160 sq ft) and there is additionally 1,420 square metres (15,300 sq ft) of office space.

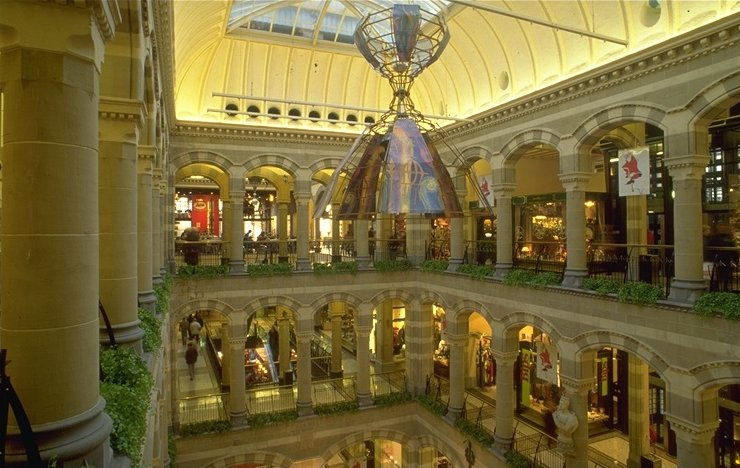
The great hall of Magna Plaza, around 2007.

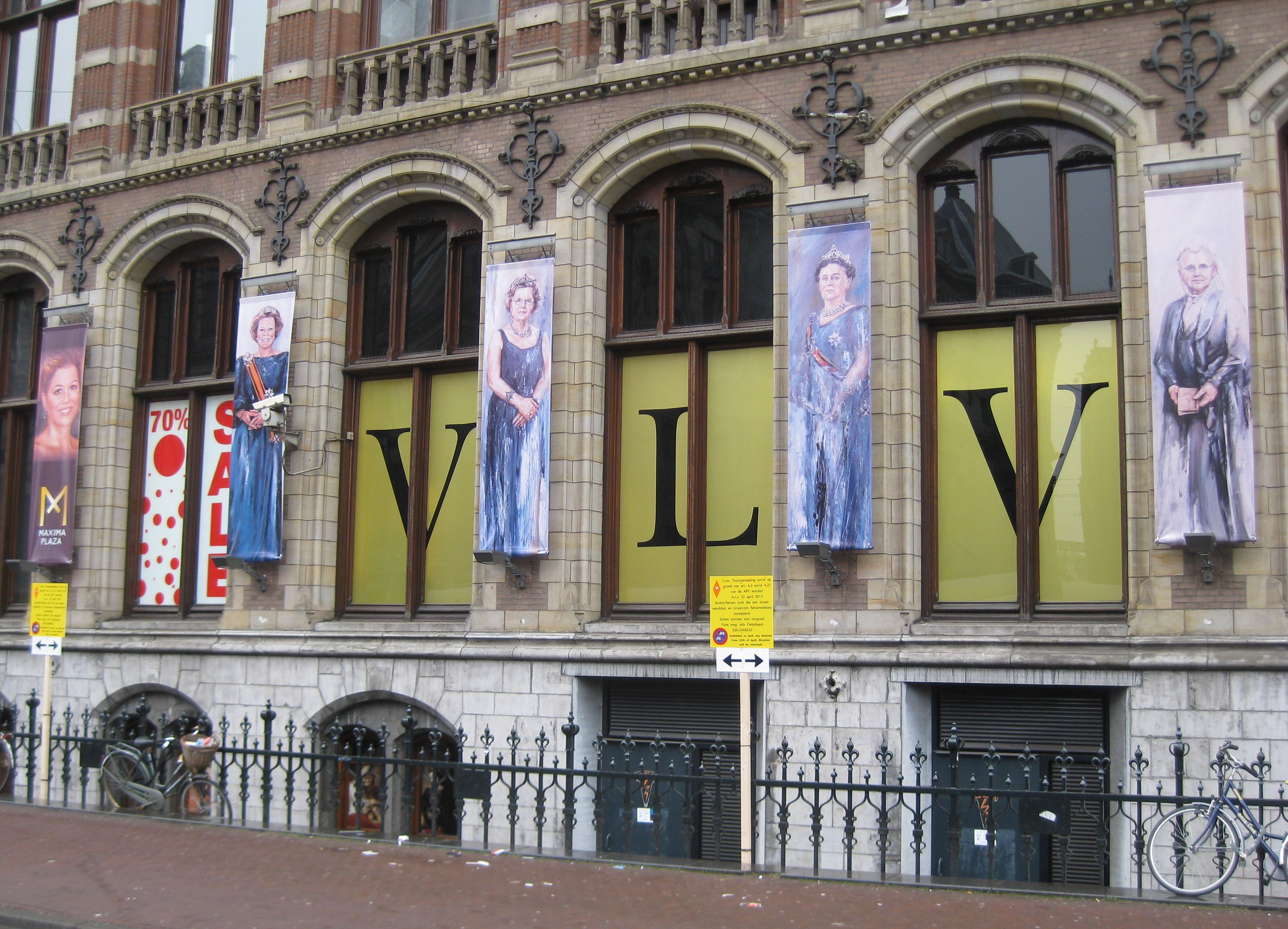
Decorations during the coronation of King Willem-Alexander, 2013.

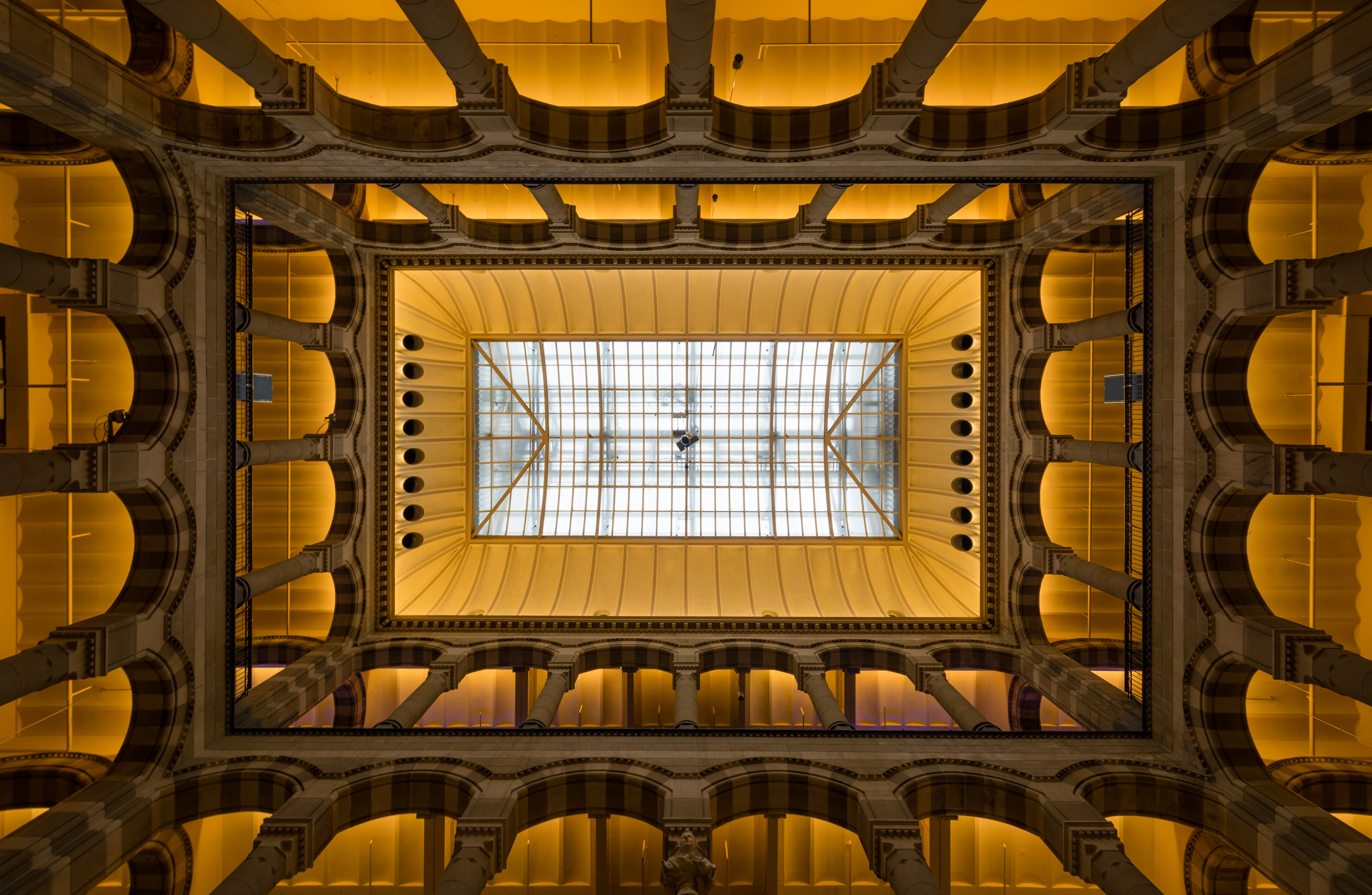
Interior view of Magna Plaza to the top with high ceiling and arcs, 2014.

== Historical images ==
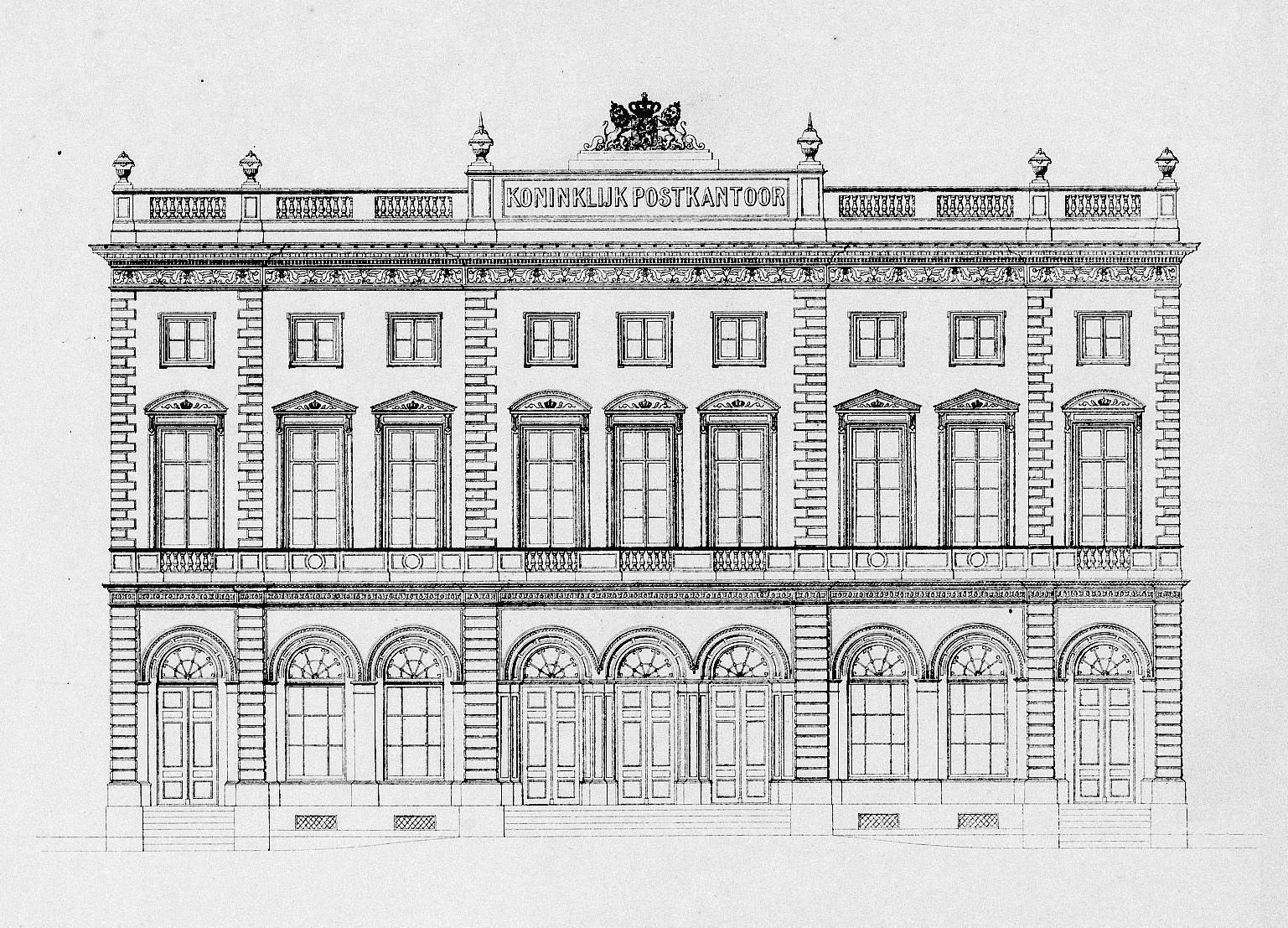
Cornelis Outshoorn (1812-1875) and Frederik Willem Conrad (1800-1870): Architect's drawing from 1854 of the older Royal Post Office at Nieuwezijds Voorburgwal 192, which was taken down in 1897.

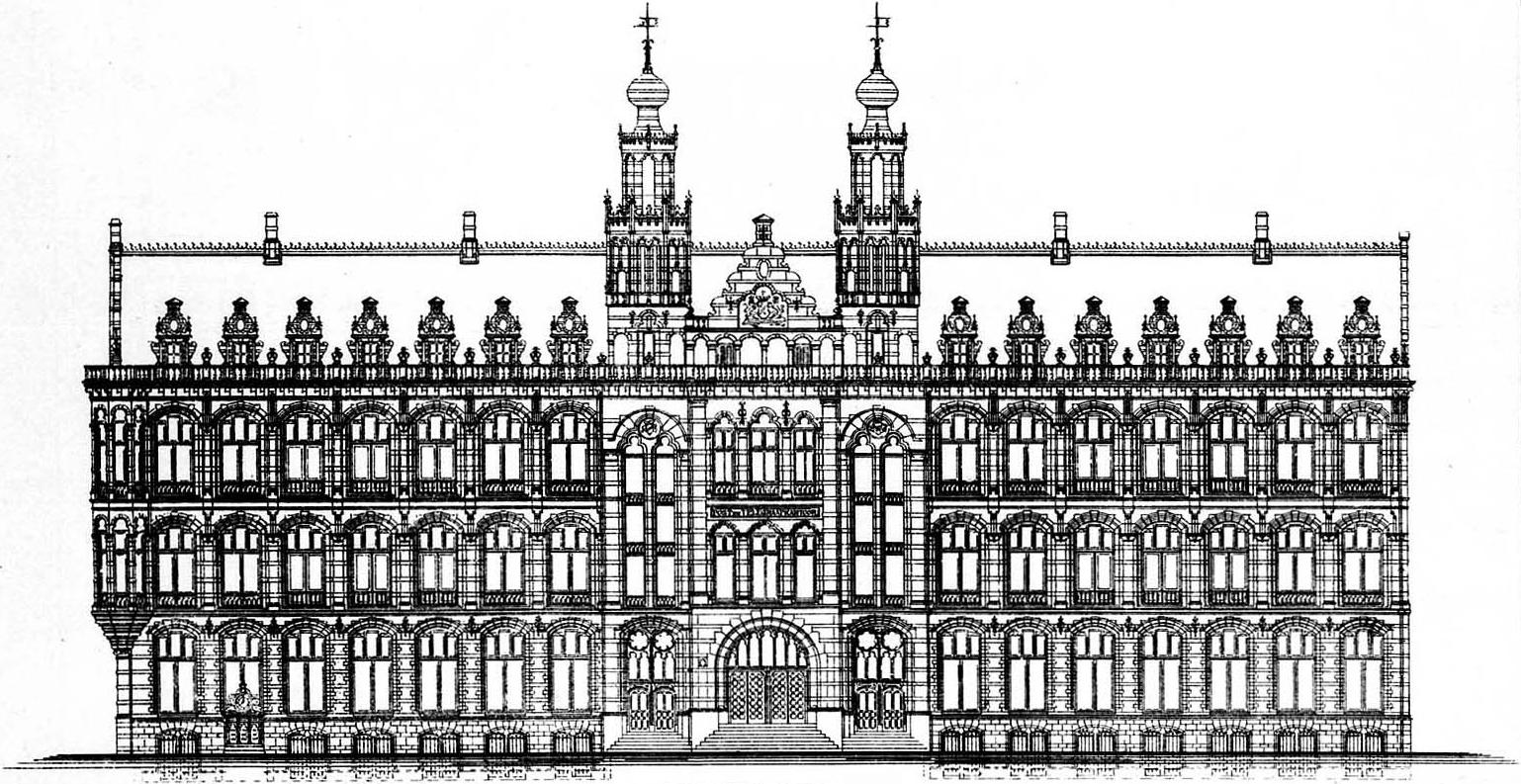
Cornelis Hendrik Peters (1847-1932): Architect's drawing of the Main Post Office as seen from the Nieuwezijds Voorburgwal, 13 July 1895.

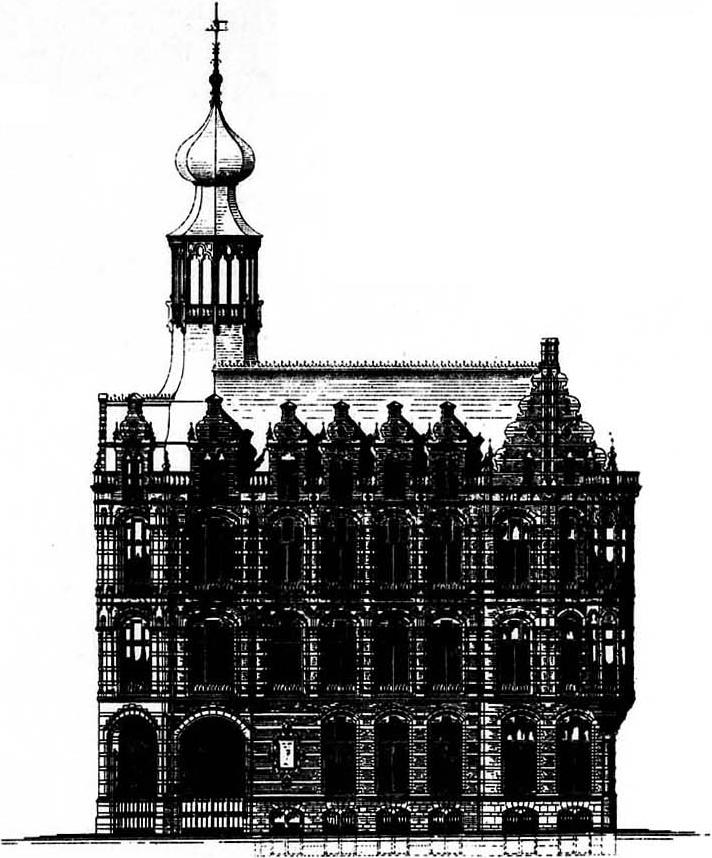
Cornelis Hendrik Peters (1847-1932): Architect's drawing of the side of the Main Post Office as seen from the Raadhuisstraat, 13 July 1895.

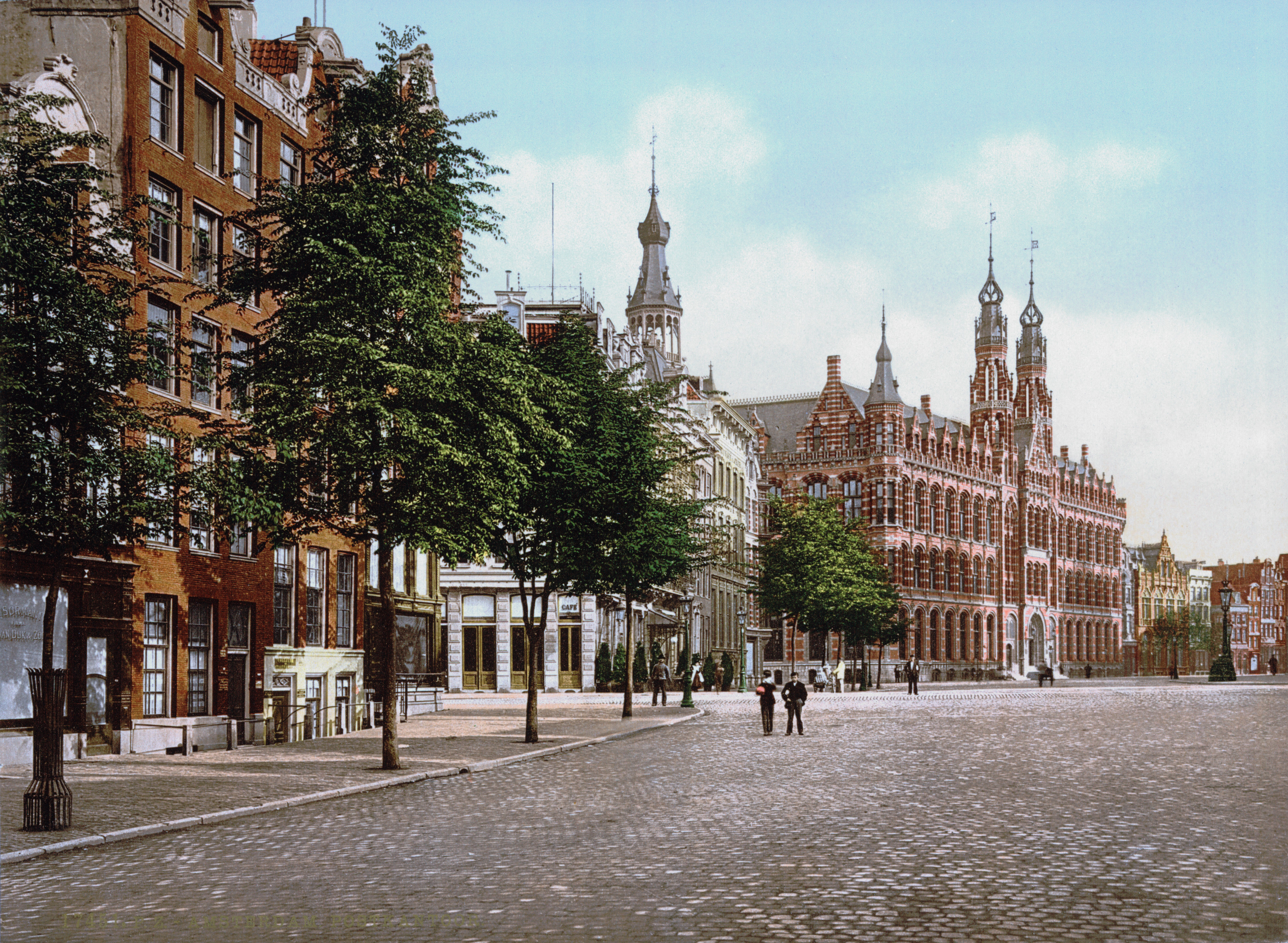
Amsterdam Main Post Office between 1890 and 1905. Photochrom print (color photo lithograph).
