= Elizabeth Blackwell Medal =

Awarded by the American Medical Women's Association

The Elizabeth Blackwell Medal is awarded annually by the American Medical Women's Association. The medal is named in honor of Elizabeth Blackwell, the first woman to receive a medical degree in the United States and a pioneer in promoting the education of women in medicine. Established by Elise S. L'Esperance in 1949, 100 years after Blackwell received her medical degree, the medal is granted to a woman physician "who has made the most outstanding contributions to the cause of women in the field of medicine." Before 1993, the medal was only awarded to members of the AMWA.

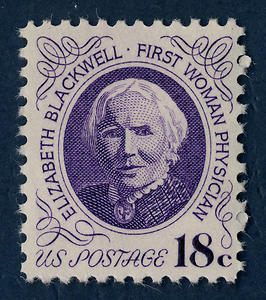
Elizabeth blackwell stamp

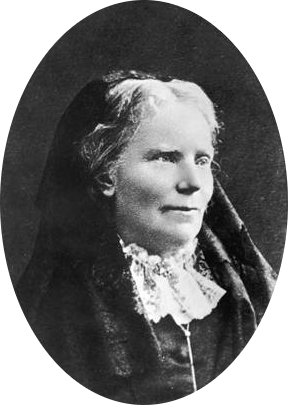
Elizabeth Blackwell

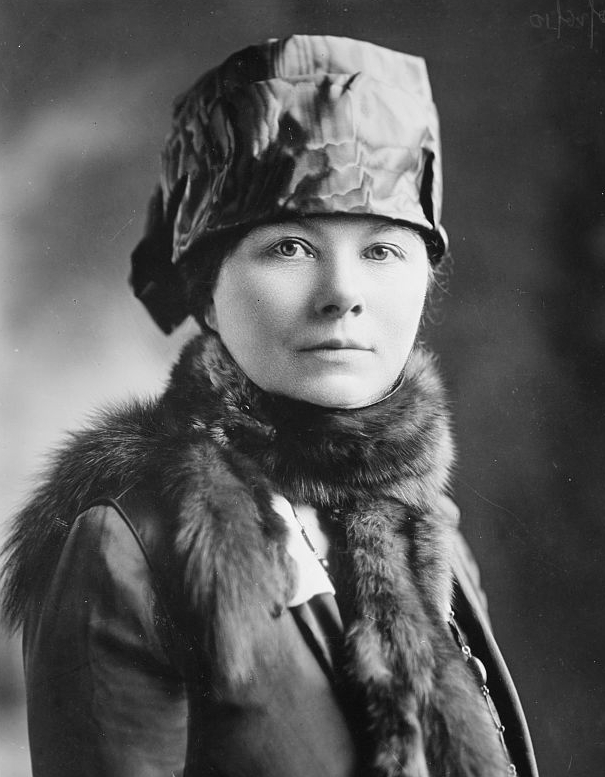
Esther Pohl Lovejoy received the award in 1951 and 1957.

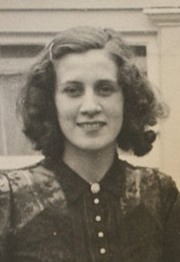
Dr. Tina Strobos was co-recipient of the award in 1998.

== Recipients ==
Source: AMWA

Year	Recipient
1949	Mary Riggs Noble
1950	Bertha Van Hoosen
1951	Esther Pohl Lovejoy
1952	Catharine Macfarlane
1953	Elizabeth Bass
1954	Mabel E. Gardner
1955	Elise S. L'Esperance
1956	Evangeline S. Stenhouse
1957	Esther Pohl Lovejoy
1958	Ada Chree Reid
1959	Helen F. Schrack
1960	Nelle Sparks Noble
1961	Elizabeth Kittredge
1962	Judith Emmelia Ahlem
1963	Elizabeth S. Waugh
1964	Helena T. Ratterman
1965	Camille Mermod
1966	Esther C. Marting
1967	Amey Chappell
1968	Margaret J. Schneider
1969	Katharine W. Wright
1970	Rosa Lee Nemir
1971	Frieda Bauman
1972	Alma Dea Morani
1973	Alice Drew Chenoweth
1974	Laura E. Morrow
1975	Ruth Hartgraves
1976	Claire F. Ryder
1977	Eva P. Dodge and Edith P. Brown
1978	Minerva S. Buerk
1979	Bernice C. Sachs
1980	Ann P.D. Manton
1981	Mathilda R. Vaschak
1982	Helen B. Taussig
1983	Clara Raven
1984	Charlotte H. Kerr and Helen M. Caldicott
1985	Carol C. Nadelson
1986	Luella Klein
1987	A. Lois Scully
1988	Claudine M. Gay
1989	Helen Octavia Dickens
1990	Lila A. Wallis
1991	Anne L. Barlow
1992	Roselyn P. Epps and Jane E. Hodgson
1993	Yoshiye Togasaki
1994	Anne H. Flitcraft
1995	Vivian W. Pinn
1996	Elizabeth W. Karlin
1997	LeClair Bissell
1998	Leah J. Dickstein and Tina Strobos
1999	Lila Stein Kroser
2000	Nanette Kass Wenger and Jeanne Spurlock
2001	No Annual Meeting, no selection
2002	Olga Jonasson
2003	Joanne Lynn
2004	Mary Jane England
2005	Sarah S. Donaldson
2006	Patricia Joy Numann
2007	Debra R. Judelson
2008	Elinor Christiansen
2009	Nancy Nielson
2010	Linda Clever
2011	Valerie Montgomery Rice
2012	Luanne Thorndyke
2013	Kimberly Templeton
2014	Mary Guinan
2015	Mae Jemison
2016	Padmini Murthy
2017	Marjorie Runyon Jenkins
2018	Michele Barry
2019	Alma Littles
2020	Darilyn Moyer
2021	Susan Thompson Hingle
2022	Julie K. Silver
2023	Nancy D. Spector

== See also ==
- List of medicine awards
- List of prizes, medals, and awards for women in science
- List of prizes named after people
