= Mary Riggs Noble =

American physician and state government official (1872–1965)

- Born: 1872; New Jersey, U.S.
- Died: 1965 (aged 92–93)
- Occupations: physician, medical missionary, hospital administrator, public health official
- Awards: Elizabeth Blackwell Medal (1949)

Mary Riggs Noble (1872–1965) was an American physician, hospital administrator, public health educator, and state official. She also served as a Christian medical missionary in Ludhiana, India. She was the first recipient of the Elizabeth Blackwell Medal in 1949.

== Early life ==
Noble was born in New Jersey and raised in Colorado Springs, Colorado. She graduated from Colorado College in 1896, and from the Woman's Medical College of Pennsylvania in 1901.

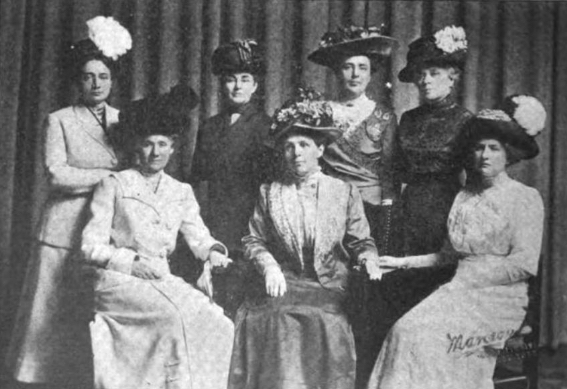
American women missionaries nicknamed the "Jubilee Troupe", speaking at missionary society celebrations in 1911. Front row: Florence Miller, Helen Barrett Montgomery, Jennie V. Hughes; Back row: Mary Riggs Noble, Etta Doane Marden, Mrs. W. T. Elmore, and Mary E. Carleton.

== Career ==
=== Mission work and tuberculosis clinic ===
Noble practiced medicine in Colorado after completing her medical degree. She taught and practiced at the Woman's Medical College in Ludhiana as a Presbyterian medical missionary from 1906 to 1909. She served women who would not, for religious reasons, be seen by male doctors. She published pamphlets based on this work, The Mission Station as a Social Settlement, Hospital Work in India, and Baby And Mother Welfare Work In India.

She settled again in Colorado Springs, where she was medical director at a free tuberculosis clinic in the 1910s. In 1911 she toured with other women missionaries nicknamed the "Jubilee Troupe" engaged to speak at the Woman's Foreign Missionary Society jubilee celebrations in various cities including Denver, Boston, New York and Washington. She addressed the annual conference of the Colorado State Union of Student Volunteers in Denver in 1914.

=== World War I ===
In 1917 and 1918, during World War I, she served on the YWCA's war council, and gave a series of talks on "sex hygiene" and "social morality" in southern and western cities, including Nashville, Salt Lake City, Tulsa, Austin, Topeka, and Wichita. "Her message will be most timely on account of the present emotional strain to which men and women are subjected," commented a Nashville newspaper. "Her lectures will urge morality as the greatest of all patriotic war work," explained a Utah newspaper.

=== Pennsylvania Department of Health ===
In the 1920s and 1930s, Noble was chief of the Preschool Division and head of the Division of Child Hygiene in the Pennsylvania Department of Health. In that role she wrote A Manual for Expectant Mothers, a brief publication on childbirth. She reported on the effort to regulate midwifery in Pennsylvania, and made reducing newborn and maternal mortality priorities of the state's health department. She encouraged churches to include health information in their education programs, and to open clinics for children. She testified at a Senate hearing on implementation of the Sheppard–Towner Act in 1932. She opposed "baby parades" as "deplorable exploitation of childhood" in a 1932 lecture at her alma mater, the Woman's Medical College in Philadelphia.

=== Professional honors ===
In 1937, Noble was elected treasurer of the American Medical Women's Association. 1949, she became the first recipient of the Elizabeth Blackwell Medal, for making "pathways for other women in medicine", and as a leader in women's health. She was a fellow of the American College of Physicians, a life member of the American Academy of Pediatrics, and a fellow of the American Medical Association.

Noble was a longtime volunteer with the Girl Scouts. When she retired from that work in 1958, she was presented with a bronze statuette from the Susquehanna Council of Girl Scouts.

== Personal life ==
Noble died in 1965, in her nineties. Some of her papers are at Drexel University.
