= Dickstein =

Dickstein is a surname. Notable people with the surname include:

- Leah J. Dickstein (1934–2019), American psychiatrist
- Mindi Dickstein, American lyricist and librettist
- Morris Dickstein (1940–2021), American literary scholar and cultural historian
- Samuel Dickstein (mathematician) (1851–1939), Polish mathematician
- Samuel Dickstein (1885–1954), American congressman and state supreme court justice
