= Etta Doane Marden =

- Born: Etta Charlotte Doane; April 20, 1851; Owosso, Michigan
- Died: March 23, 1946 (aged 94); Claremont, California
- Occupations: Christian missionary in Turkey, 1881-1925

Etta Doane Marden (April 20, 1851 – March 23, 1946) was an American Christian missionary in Turkey from 1881 to 1925.

== Early life ==
Etta Charlotte Doane was born in Owosso, Michigan, the daughter of Gilbert Griswold Doane and Lucy Guilford Doane.

== Career ==
Doane was commissioned by the American Board of Commissioners for Foreign Missions in 1881, in Boston, to be Congregationalist teacher in Turkey. She remained there from 1881 to 1825, serving first in Marash (Maraş), and later at a school in the Gedik Pasha (Gedikpaşa) quarter in Constantinople. The Gedik Pasha station offered meetings and vocational training for women, in addition to Bible lessons for men and women, a coffeehouse, public lectures, and a school for children and youths.

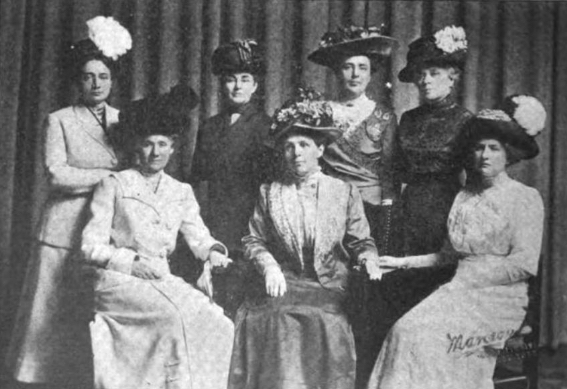
American women missionaries speaking at jubilee celebrations in 1911. Front row: Florence Miller, Helen Barrett Montgomery, Jennie V. Hughes; Back row: Mary Riggs Noble, Etta Doane Marden, Mrs. W. T. Elmore, and Mary E. Carleton.

Marden spoke about her work at a statewide women's mission gatherings in Iowa, Illinois, and Minnesota in 1902 and 1903. In 1910 she sailed from Liverpool to Boston on the Lusitania, and in 1910 and 1911 Marden toured in the United States with other American missionary women, including Jennie V. Hughes, Helen Barrett Montgomery, and Mary Riggs Noble, to speak at jubilee celebrations in various cities. She left Constantinople to spend a health leave in Switzerland in the summer of 1917, and was giving lectures in the United States the following spring.

Marden moved to southern California when she retired from Turkey in 1925. She spoke on her experiences at church events in California during her retirement. She wrote to the editors of the Los Angeles Times to protest unsubstantiated information they published about "Turkish harems". She donated an example of Turkish embroidery to the Art Institute of Chicago.

== Personal life ==
Doane became the third wife of fellow missionary Rev. Henry Marden in 1882, in Marash. She was widowed when Henry died from typhus in Athens in 1890. She died in 1946, aged 94 years, in Claremont, California.
