= Jeanne Spurlock =

American psychiatrist, professor, and author

- Born: July 19, 1921; Sandusky
- Died: November 25, 1999; Washington, D.C.
- Education: Spelman College, Roosevelt University, Howard University
- Occupation: Psychiatrist
- Employers: American Psychiatric Association; Michael Reese Hospital
- Awards: Elizabeth Blackwell Medal (2000); Strecker Award (1971); honorary degree from Spelman College (1984)

Jeanne Marybeth Spurlock (July 19, 1921 – November 25, 1999) was an American psychiatrist, professor and author. Her psychiatric work centered on the impact of prejudice and discrimination on the mental health of various minority groups, including racial minorities, children, and single mothers. She served as the deputy medical director of the American Psychiatric Association for seventeen years. She chaired the Department of Psychiatry at Meharry Medical College starting in 1968, and she taught at George Washington University and Howard University. She also operated her own private psychiatry practice, and she published several works.

== Early life and education ==
Jeanne Spurlock was born in Sandusky, Ohio in 1921. She was the oldest of seven children born to Frank and Glodene Spurlock. She broke her leg when she was nine years old, and had an unpleasant experience at a hospital. Feeling that there was a lack of caring doctors, but also thinking she would not be able to afford medical school, she decided to become a teacher.

Spurlock attended high school in Detroit, Michigan. She enrolled at Spelman College in Atlanta, Georgia in 1940, but despite a scholarship, could not afford to complete her education there. She moved to Chicago, Illinois, where she continued her undergraduate degree at Roosevelt University. In 1943, she entered an accelerated program at Howard University College of Medicine, and graduated with her medical degree in 1947.

== Career ==
Spurlock interned at Provident Hospital in Chicago, after graduating from Howard University. She became a resident in the psychiatry department of Cook County Hospital in Chicago, completing her residency in 1950. She took a fellowship in child psychiatry at the Institute for Juvenile Research, where she continued to work as a staff psychiatrist for some time after completing the fellowship. She later worked at the Mental Hygiene Clinic at Women's and Children's Hospital, and consulted for the Illinois School for the Deaf. She moved to the Chicago Institute for Psychoanalysis in 1953 to train in adult and child psychoanalysis, and she also directed the Children's Psychosomatic Unit at the Neuropsychiatric Institute at the University of Illinois. In 1960, she took a position at Michael Reese Hospital, where she was an attending psychiatrist and the chief of the Child Psychiatry Clinic until 1968. During this time, she also taught at Illinois College of Medicine as an assistant professor, and ran a private practice.

In 1968, Spurlock left her position at Michael Reese Hospital to become the chair of the Department of Psychiatry at Meharry Medical College. In 1973, she became a visiting scientist at the Division of Special Mental Health Programs at the National Institute of Mental Health. In 1974, she accepted the position of deputy medical director at the American Psychiatric Association, which she held until 1991. She also served as the director of their Office of Minority/National Affairs. During this time she continued to operate her private practice. She also continued to teach, working as a clinical professor at George Washington University and at Howard University.

Spurlock was also an activist, particularly when she was located near Washington, D.C. while working for the American Psychiatric Association. She often worked to convince legislators to provide funding for medical education, especially for minorities. She was a member of the boards of directors of the Carnegie Corporation, National Urban League, Physicians for Human Rights, and the Delta Adult Literacy Council. She was a member of the American College of Psychiatrists, National Medical Association, American Medical Women's Association, American Academy of Child and Adolescent Psychiatry, and the Black Psychiatrists of America. During the 1960s, she worked with other physicians to care for civil rights workers in Mississippi and Chicago.

Spurlock served on editorial boards, and she wrote academic articles, particularly on sexism, racism, and cultural misunderstanding within mental health. She published Culturally Diverse Children and Adolescents: Assessment, Diagnosis, and Treatment with Ian A. Canino in 1994. In 1999, she published Black Psychiatrists and American Psychiatry, a historical text detailing black psychiatrists who have influenced American psychiatry, and their experiences.

After attending the 1970 White House Conference on Children, Spurlock won the Edward A Strecker M.D. Award for excellence in psychiatry from the Institute of the Pennsylvania Hospital in 1971. She was both the first African American and the first woman to win this award. In 1989, Spurlock won the Agnes Purcell McGavin Award. In 1990, she was awarded the Guardian for Children Award from the National Black Child Development Institute. In 1992, she won a Special Presidential Commendation Award from the American Psychiatry Association. In 1996, the American Psychiatry Association awarded her the Distinguished Service Award. Spurlock also won the Solomon Carter Fuller Award.

== Legacy ==
The American Academy of Child and Adolescent Psychiatry created two fellowships in Spurlock's honor after her death: the Jeanne Spurlock Minority Medical Student Clinical Fellowship in Child and Adolescent Psychiatry, and, with the National Institute on Drug Abuse, the Jeanne Spurlock Research Fellowship in Drug Abuse and Addiction for Minority Medical Students. The American Psychiatric Association also created two fellowships: the Jeanne Spurlock Minority Fellowship Achievement Award and the Jeanne Spurlock Congressional Fellowship.

In 2000, Spurlock was posthumously awarded the Elizabeth Blackwell Award, the American Medical Women's Association's highest honor.
