= Alma Littles =

American physician

Littles speaks to the Senate Aging Committee in 2026

Alma Littles is a family medicine physician who is the Dean and Chief Academic Officer at the Florida State University College of Medicine. In 2019, Littles received the Elizabeth Blackwell Award from the American Medical Women's Association.

== Early life and education ==
Littles was born in Quincy, Florida as the youngest of 12 children in a family of rural farm workers. She is the first in her family to attend college, graduating with a Doctor of Medicine (MD) in 1986 from the University of Florida. In 1989, Littles completed her residency in family medicine at Tallahassee Memorial Hospital (TMH). After completing her MD, she returned to Quincy to practice family medicine.

In 1999, Littles completed a fellowship in Faculty Development at the University of North Carolina.

== Career ==
In 1996, Littles joined the faculty of the TMH Family Medicine Residency Program in 1996, and became the program's director in 1999. In 2016-17, she served as the Chair of the TMH Board of Directors.

Littles has served as President of the Florida Academy of Family Physicians and the Capital Medical Society, and as the Chair of the American Medical Association’s Academic Physicians Section.

Littles is a contributing author to the textbook Contemporary Challenges in Medical Education, published in 2019.

=== Florida State University ===
Littles was heavily involved in the creation and development of the Florida State University (FSU) College of Medicine. When the college opened in 2001, she was the founding chair of the college's Department of Family Medicine and Rural Health, and the acting assistant dean for the Tallahassee Regional Medical School Campus.

In 2003, Littles was appointed Senior Associate Dean for Medical Education and Academic Affairs. In this role, she led the implementation and development of the medical student curriculum, oversaw the college's first residency program, and led the school's accreditation process.

In February 2023, Littles was appointed the interim Dean of the FSU College of Medicine. As of February 2024, Littles is the college's interim Dean and Chief Academic Officer.

=== Awards and recognition ===
In 1993, Littles was named "Florida Family Physician of the Year" by the Florida Academy of Family Physicians. In 1997, Littles was recognized as a New Faculty Scholar by the Society of Teachers of Family Development.

The Tallahassee Democrat named Littles one of the "25 Women You Need to Know in Tallahassee" in 2010. In 2014, she was named by Black Health magazine as one of the country's "Top 15 most Influential African American Medical Educators." In the same year, Littles received the Outstanding Physician of the Year Award from Capital Medical Society.

Littles is the recipient of the 2019 Elizabeth Blackwell Award from the American Medical Women's Association, which is awarded annually to "the woman physician who has made the most outstanding contribution to the cause of women in the field of medicine."

== Personal life ==
Littles is married to Gentle Littles III and has a son named Gentle Germaine Littles.

== Selected publications ==
- Hurt, Myra M.; Littles, Alma B. (February 2009). "The Price of Changing the Status Quo". Academic Medicine. 84 (2): 151. doi:10.1097/ACM.0b013e31819398e4. ISSN 1040-2446. PMID 19174647.
- Bradley, Edward L.; Littles, Alma B.; Romrell, Lynn J. (2012-09-01). "The surgical clerkship: a contemporary paradigm". Journal of Surgical Research. 177 (1): 14–20. doi:10.1016/j.jss.2012.03.012. ISSN 0022-4804. PMID 22482766.
- Beitsch, Leslie; Geletko, Karen; Bellamy, Gail; Aubrey, Andree; Myers, Karen; Dunn, Luckey; Littles, Alma; Fogarty, John (2017-08-02). "Student and Preceptor Perceptions of the Summer Clinical Practicum: An Assessment of the First Year Clinical Skills Capstone". MedEdPublish. 6: 140. doi:10.15694/mep.2017.000140. ISSN 2312-7996. PMC 10885285. PMID 38406394.
