= Padmini Murthy =

Physician

Padmini Murthy is a physician, Professor and Global Health Director at New York Medical College. In 2016 she was awarded the Elizabeth Blackwell Medal by the American Medical Women's Association for her contribution to the field of women in medicine.

== Education ==
Murthy is a qualified physician who has been practicing for over 30 years. She attended medical school at Guntur Medical College in India, and she did her residency in Obstetrics and Gynecology. She has a Master's in Public Health from New York University and a Master's in Management from New York University's Wagner Graduate School of Public Service. During her time at New York University, she was on the Dean's list at the Steinhart School of Education and has been named as Public Service Scholar at the Wagner Graduate School of Public Service.

== Career ==
Murthy is a Certified Health Education Specialist with the National Commission for Health Education Credentialing. She services on United Nations NGO committees as a representative of the American Medical Women’s Association (AMWA) and has previously been a consultant to the United Nations. She was appointed Chair of the Committee on Women's Rights of the American Public Health Association for three consecutive terms, starting in November 2012. She is currently an associate professor in Health Policy and Management and Family and Community Medicine and Global Health Director at New York Medical College.

Murthy is an advocate for promoting safe motherhood initiatives. She focuses her research on human rights and women's health and works with underserved communities in India, Malawi, Grenada, and Nepal to educate others and focus on the social determinants of health and safe motherhood practices. She has supplied up to 5,000 safe motherhood kits to women in India, Malawi, Grenada, and Nepal. The Governor General of Grenada has acknowledged Murthy's public health efforts targeted towards the women of Grenada. Murthy has spoken on the radio show Millennium Development Goals on African Views Radio, where she was a host and a scriptwriter. She has given various talks as a keynote speaker at several universities and international conferences.

== Personal life ==
Murthy's hobbies include reading, cooking, doing yoga, and traveling. She has visited six out of the seven continents and has expressed that she would like to visit all seven continents. She has a daughter

== Works ==
Murthy has several works including blog posts written to the AWMA and 2 books.

2009: Women's Global Health and Human Rights

2020: Human Rights Including the Latest Technology and Global Public Health, "U.S. Picks Worst Possible Moment to Cut Funding to WHO", "Inter-Faith Teamwork Promoting Relief Efforts Globally"

^{2022: "Climate Crisis, Women’s Health and Gender Equity}

== Awards ==
Murthy became a Fellow of the New York Academy of Medicine in 2010.

She was awarded the National Council of Women USA Distinguished Leadership Award in 2011.

The National Association of Professional Women USA named Murthy as the Women of the Year for 2012-2013.

In 2013, she became the first U.S. physician to win the Jhirad Oration Award. She was awarded the Marie Catchatoor Memorial Award.

She was also named the best physician at the workplace by the Ministry of Health in Saudi Arabia.

In 2015 Murthy received the Millennium Milestone Maker Award. That same year she also was named Professional of the Year by the International Association of Who's Who, for her achievements in medicine, education, and public health.

Murthy received the Dr. Lata Patil Inaugural Oration Award in 2016, and the Dr. Homi Colabawalla Oration Award. She was also awarded the Sojourner Truth Pin, awarded to women who excel in community service.

In 2016 she was awarded the Elizabeth Blackwell Medal, the highest award given by the American Medical Women's Association, which recognizes annually a woman physician for her outstanding contribution to the cause of women in medicine. She was the first Indian-American awardee.

In 2022, Murthy was honored with the Presidential Lifetime Achievement Award by 46th American President Joseph R. Biden for her 4,000 hours of community service. This award recognized her volunteer public health work with the AMWA and various other organizations. During the COVID-19 pandemic, she worked to raise funds to support affected communities. She also supplied personal protective equipment (PPE) and oxygen concentrators to communities in India during this time.

On International Women's Day 2023, the FIAA and Consulate General of India NY recognized Murthy as an honoree.

The International Association of Top Professionals (IAOTP) selected Murthy as the Top Global Health Leader of the Decade for 2024.
