= Nanette Wenger =

American clinical cardiologist

- Born: September 3, 1930 (age 96); New York City
- Education: Hunter College 1951, Harvard Medical School 1954
- Known for: Focus on heart disease in women
- Medical career
- Field: Cardiology

Nanette Kass Wenger (born September 3, 1930) is an American clinical cardiologist and professor emerita at Emory University School of Medicine in Atlanta, Georgia. She is known for her work on heart disease in women.

== Early life and education ==
Nanette Wenger was born September 3, 1930, in New York City to parents who had emigrated from Russia to the United States and settled in New York. Her early education was in the New York City public schools. In 1951 she graduated summa cum laude from Hunter College in New York. She received her doctor of medicine degree from Harvard Medical School in 1954 as one of their first female graduates, and began her postgraduate work at Mount Sinai Hospital in New York, where she became the first woman to be chief resident in the cardiology department. After her residency, she moved to Emory University, where she started as an instructor and eventually was named full professor of medicine in 1971.

== Contributions to medicine ==
Wenger has been a leader in the cardiology field as she has authored and co-authored more than 1,300 scientific and review articles and book chapters. Over the course of her career, Wenger became one of the first doctors to focus on heart disease in women, since this disease was initially thought to primarily affect men. In 1993 Wenger co-wrote a landmark review article that demonstrated that cardiovascular disease does similarly affect women since, at the time, women were more likely than men to die from the disease. She also helped write the 2007 Guidelines for Preventing Cardiovascular Disease in Women. She has devoted the rest of her career to understand how heart disease, specifically coronary artery disease, affects women as well as advocating for the need to disaggregate study results and report gender-specific analyses from clinical trials.

Wenger was editor of the American Journal of Geriatric Cardiology for 15 years and was also a founder of the Society of Geriatric Cardiology, which is now the Council on the Cardiac Care of Older Adults at the American College of Cardiology.

== Personal life ==
She is married to Dr. Julius Wenger, a gastroenterologist; she has three daughters. In 1979, she founded the Atlanta Women’s Network, which continues to promote and enhance the success of professional women.

== Selected awards and honors ==
Some of the awards/honors Wenger has acquired include:

- 1993: Received the American Medical Women's Association's (AMWA) Woman in Science President's Award.
- 1998: Received the American Heart Association's Physician of the Year.
- 1999: Received the distinguished Achievement Award from the Scientific Councils of the American Heart Association.
- 1999: Received the Women in Cardiology Mentoring Award from the American Heart Association.
- 2000: Received the Elizabeth Blackwell Medal
- 2000: Received the James D. Bruce Memorial Award from the American College of Physicians.
- 2002: Received the Distinguished Fellow Award of the Society of Geriatric Cardiology.
- 2004: Received the Gold Heart Award, the highest award of the American Heart Association.
- 2009: Received the Lifetime Achievement Award from the American College of Cardiology.
- 2013: Received the Inaugural Distinguished Mentor Award of the American College of Cardiology.
- 2015: The American College of Cardiology Inaugural Bernadine Healy Leadership in Women's Cardiovascular Disease Award
