= Elise L'Esperance =

American pathologist and physician

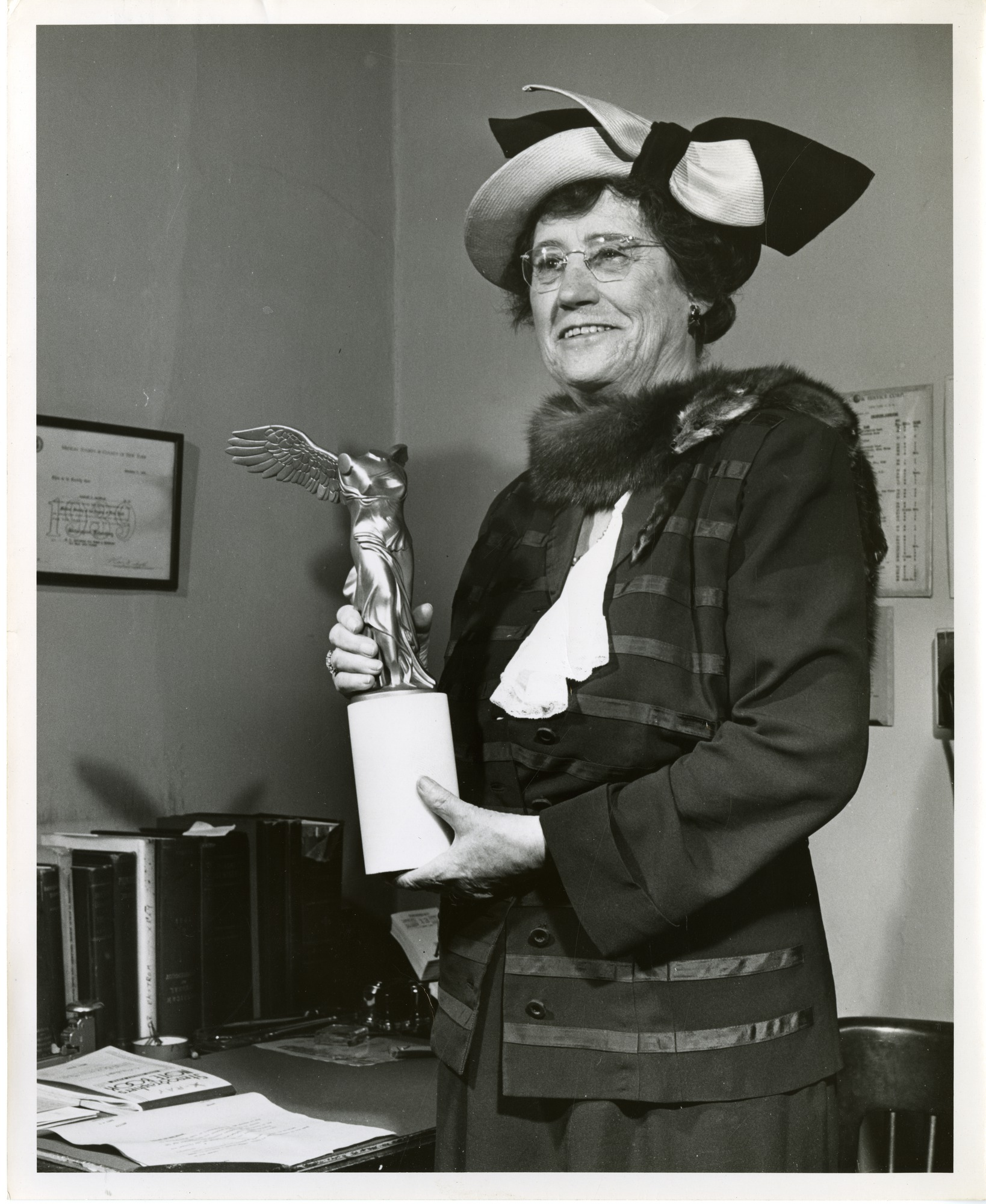
- L'Esperance in 1951
- Born: Elise Depew Strang; 1878; Yorktown, New York
- Died: 1958 (aged 79–80)
- Education: Woman's Medical College of the New York Infirmary for Women and Children
- Known for: Strang Tumor Clinic, Strang Cancer Prevention Clinic
- Scientific career
- Fields: Pathologist, physician
- Workplaces: Cornell University Medical College.

Elise Depew Strang L'Esperance (1878–1958) was an American pathologist and physician, a pioneer in establishing a preventive model of cancer treatment. She was a pathologist noted for establishing cancer prevention clinics in New York. She founded two clinics: the Strang Tumor Clinic in 1932 and the Strang Cancer Prevention Clinic in 1937, which operated out of the New York Infirmary. In 1940, L'Esperance opened a second branch of the Strang Cancer Prevention Clinic at the Memorial Center for Cancer and Allied Diseases. During her medical career, L'Esperance published her research prolifically, credited for approximately 30 articles in medical journals.

== Early life and education ==
Elise L'Esperance was born in Yorktown, New York, to Albert Strang, a physician, and Kate Depew Strang. Inspired by her father, she pursued a career in medicine and attended the Woman's Medical College of the New York Infirmary for Women and Children, earning her M.D. there in 1900. Interested in pediatrics, L'Esperance spent a year working at Babies Hospital in New York. She then worked for two years at a private pediatric practice in Detroit, Michigan.

== Career ==
In 1908, she turned to medical research. In 1920, she became professor of pathology at Cornell University Medical College. In 1948–1949, she was president of the American Medical Women's Association. In 1946, she was the first editor of the Journal of the American Medical Women's Association.
