= Julie K. Silver =

American medical researcher

- Born: 1965 (age 60–61); California, U.S.
- Education: University of California, Davis; Georgetown University School of Medicine
- Scientific career
- Workplaces: Harvard Medical School

Julie Kathleen Silver (born 1965) is an American medical researcher who is an associate professor in the Department of Physical Medicine and Rehabilitation at the Harvard Medical School. Her research considers musculoskeletal disorders and cancer rehabilitation. Silver is involved with several initiatives to improve gender equity in medicine. She is the 2022 recipient of the Elizabeth Blackwell Medal.

== Early life and education ==
Silver grew up in Northern California. Silver earned her bachelor's degree at the University of California, Davis. She was initially an engineering major, and while she enjoyed mathematics and science, Silver eventually studied medicine at the Georgetown University School of Medicine, and graduated in 1991. Silver has said that she enjoyed being in Georgetown because of the diversity of patients and medical conditions. She was a medical resident at the National Rehabilitation Hospital in Washington, D.C. in the early nineties. During her training she witnessed the impact of the gun violence and AIDS epidemic on public health.

In 2003 Silver was diagnosed with breast cancer, and following acute treatment, she recognised that there was not enough rehabilitation for patients recovering from toxic cancer therapies. She founded Oncology Rehab Partners in 2012, an organization which delivers oncology rehabilitation services to cancer centres and hospitals .

== Research and career ==
Silver concentrates her research on pre- and rehabilitation from cancer. She founded the Survivor Training and Rehab (STAR) programme certification, an evidence-based education scheme that looks to support physicians and healthcare workers with protocols to provide quality care for recovering cancer patients.

During the COVID-19 pandemic, Silver wrote an article for The BMJ outlining how prehabilitation could be used to protect people during the outbreak. She made use of social media to communicate recent coronavirus research findings with the public. Silver designed a guidelines on how to conduct telemedicine appointments during the pandemic.

=== Academic service ===
Silver became interested in gender equity in medicine when she was appointed associate chair of the Department of Physical Medicine at the Harvard Medical School. She makes use of data to document the disparities experienced by women physicians, including analysing how differences in how men and women are valued. Silver has investigated the rates at which men and women were honoured for their work, and found "a zero or near-zero" representation of women amongst the award winners. She directs a medical education course in women's leadership, where she discusses core competencies and equity. Silver has analysed how often women and men are mentioned in the newsletters of a medical professional society, and identified that over a five-year period, whilst men were mentioned in 100% of the newsletters, women were not mentioned in one third.

== Selected publications ==
- Essentials of physical medicine and rehabilitation : musculoskeletal disorders, pain, and rehabilitation. Frontera, Walter R., 1955-, Silver, J. K. (Julie K.), 1965-, Rizzo, Thomas D., 1959- (Fourth ed.). Philadelphia. 30 November 2018. ISBN 978-0-323-54947-9. OCLC 1081423365.
- Silver, Julie K.; Baima, Jennifer (2013). "Cancer Prehabilitation". American Journal of Physical Medicine & Rehabilitation. 92 (8): 715–727. doi:10.1097/phm.0b013e31829b4afe. ISSN 0894-9115. PMID 23756434. S2CID 21085439.
- Silver, Julie K.; Baima, Jennifer; Mayer, R. Samuel (2013-07-15). "Impairment-driven cancer rehabilitation: An essential component of quality care and survivorship". CA: A Cancer Journal for Clinicians. 63 (5): 295–317. doi:10.3322/caac.21186. ISSN 0007-9235. PMID 23856764. S2CID 12773186.

== Personal life ==
Silver is married with three children.
