= Rosa Lee Nemir =

American physician (1905–1992)

Rosa Lee Nemir, MD (July 16, 1905 - April 27, 1992) was an American physician working as a pulmonary and pediatrics specialist. She is recognized as one of the first women in America to achieve a complete professorship in pediatrics.

== Early life and education ==
Born in the city of Waco, Texas to Mr. and Mrs. David Nemir, Nemir attended Austin High School and graduated in 1922 with straight A's, receiving a university scholarship. She graduated in 1926 from the University of Texas and went on to further her education four years later at Johns Hopkins University Medical School in 1930.

== Career ==
Nemir is recognized as one of the first women in America to achieve a complete professorship in pediatrics, and as a former president of the American Medical Women's Association (1963–1964), she encouraged other American women to pursue careers in medicine and healthcare.

Nemir served as the vice president of the Medical Women's International Association (MWIA) on behalf of North America, medical director for the Judson Health Center's Adolescent Girls Clinic, officer for the Young Men's Christian Association (YMCA), manager for the Brooklyn chapter of the American Red Cross, head director of the Pediatric Laboratories at Gouverneur Hospital and Bellevue Children's Chest Clinic, and board member for the Brooklyn Kindergarten Society, Willoughby House Settlement, and Irvington House for Children.

During her professional career, Nemir worked at New York University's medical school and Belluvue Hospital Center until the onset of her lung fibrosis. The central interest of her research centered around acquiring knowledge on tuberculosis and how to cure this disease. Through studies conducted on tuberculosis patients, Nemir investigated the interaction between steroids and the disease, and she was also the first professional to administer the drug rifampin to treat TB in children. Additionally, Nemir analyzed the effects of rifampin in a thirty-year study following a set of TB patients from their childhood into adulthood. After years of data collection and research, rifampin is a standardized drug used to treat tuberculosis (often in combination with other drugs)

== Personal life ==
Residing in Brooklyn during the latter years of her life, Nemir died on April 27, 1992, at Tisch Hospital of New York University (NYU) in Manhattan at the age of 86. The cause of her death was from lung fibrosis. Her husband E. J. Audi died two decades prior in 1968. At the time of her death, she had three surviving children.
