= Nancy D. Spector =

American physician and professor

- Education: B.A. at Brown University M.D. at University of Massachusetts Medical School
- Occupation: Professor of Pediatrics
- Awards: Elizabeth Blackwell Award

Nancy D. Spector is a Doctor of Pediatric Medicine and the 2023 recipient of the Elizabeth Blackwell Award. Spector is most known for her contributions to gender equality and teaching in medical school management. Spector is currently a Professor of Pediatrics, Senior Vice Dean for Faculty, the Executive Director of Executive Leadership in Medicine program (ELAM), the Executive Leadership in Health Care Program (ELH), and the Lynn Yeakel Institute for Women's Health and Leadership (IWHL) at the Drexel University College of Medicine. Spector is also the Betty A. Cohen Chair in Women's Health at Drexel.

== Education and career ==
Spector received her Bachelor of Arts (B.A.) in General Biology from Brown University and attended the University of Massachusetts Medical School for her medical degree. Spector also completed a fellowship in faculty development at Michigan State University and completed coursework in leadership and faculty development at the Association of American Medical Colleges and the Harvard Macy Institute. Spector joined St. Christopher's Hospital for Children in Philadelphia, Pennsylvania in 1997, where she would go on to complete her residency, chief residency, and general academic pediatrics fellowship. At St. Christopher's, Spector served as a Vice Chair for Education and Faculty Development and Associate Director of the Pediatric Residency program from 2002 to 2012. Spector was also the Pediatric Residency program director from 2012 to 2016.

Spector grew up with strong ties to education and teaching, as both of her parents are educators. Spector realized her interests in education during her pediatric residency, where she was also introduced to the field of academic medicine. A mentor gave Spector the advice to take leadership courses, in which she realized her passion for medical education, faculty development, and equity in higher level management in medical schools.

In 2019, Spector claimed that only 12% of deans are women. In 2022, Spector reports that this number has grown to 19%. Spector acknowledges the lack of women in leadership positions within medicine, and aims to support women with the skills and network necessary for success as well as healthy support systems through ELAM. ELAM is a one-year fellowship that offers leadership training to support female candidates for leadership roles in academic medicine, dentistry, public health, and pharmacy.

== Awards ==
On February 3, 2023, which was also National Women Physicians Day, Spector was awarded with the 2023 Elizabeth Blackwell Award by the American Medical Women's Association for her contributions as a leader in academic medicine, particularly in gender equality and mentorship. The Blackwell award honors the first American female to receive a Doctor of Medicine degree, Dr. Elizabeth Blackwell, and is awarded to a female physician that has made significant contributions for women in medicine. Spector has also won other awards for her mentorship, such as the Robert S. Holm Award from the Association of Pediatric Program, the Elias Abrutyn Mentoring Award from Drexel University College of Medicine, the Miller Sarkin Mentoring Award from the Academic Pediatric Association, and the John M Eisenberg Award from the National Quality Forum.
