= Olga Jonasson =

American transplant surgeon

- Born: August 12, 1934; Peoria, Illinois
- Died: August 30, 2006 (aged 72)
- Education: Northwestern University; University of Illinois College of Medicine
- Medical career
- Institutions: University of Illinois; Ohio State University
- Awards: Elizabeth Blackwell Medal

Olga Jonasson (August 12, 1934 – August 30, 2006) was an American transplant surgeon. She performed the first kidney transplant in the state of Illinois. She was also the first woman to be appointed head of an academic department of surgery at a coeducational school of medicine (Ohio State University) and the first woman to be appointed chief of surgery of a major medical center.

== Early life and education ==
Olga Jonasson was born in Peoria, Illinois on August 12, 1934. During her childhood she moved with her family to Chicago, where her mother worked as a nurse and her father served as a Lutheran minister at Ebenezer Lutheran Church. Jonasson's family moved to Connecticut briefly when she was 16, but Jonasson remained in Chicago and began her studies at Northwestern University.

In 1956, Jonasson started medical school at the University of Illinois College of Medicine. While in medical school, Jonasson was elected to Alpha Omega Alpha, a national medical honor society. Jonasson completed her residency at the University of Illinois. After her residency, Jonasson spent a year at Walter Reed Army Institute of Research in Washington D.C. where she had a postdoctoral Fellowship under Dr. Elmer Becker in which she studied immunohistochemistry. She then had another year long research and clinical fellowship under at Massachusetts General Hospital in Boston where she studied transplantation immunobiology under Dr. Henry J. Winn and Dr. Paul S. Russell.

== Medical career ==
In 1963, Jonasson was named an instructor in surgery at the University of Illinois. In 1965, she was certified by the American Board of Surgery. She was the 37th women to be certified. In 1968, she developed the department of transplantation at the University of Illinois. In 1969, she performed the first kidney transplant in the state of Illinois. In 1974, she became a founding member of the National Tissue Typing and Histocompatibility Organization. In 1977, Jonasson was named chief of surgery of Cook County Hospital. This appointment made her the first woman appointed chief of surgery of a major hospital. In 1987, she left Cook County Hospital when she was named Robert M. Zollinger Professor of Surgery at the Ohio State University. This appointment conferred her as the first woman to head an academic department of surgery at a coeducational medical college.

== Personal life ==
Jonasson dedicated much of her free time to working for causes she cared about. In the 1990s she raised $3 million for the major reconstruction of her church, the Church of the Epiphany. She also volunteered hundreds of hours working on the interior of the church during its renovation. Jonasson invited students into her home for her monthly dinner, the Chief's club. During this dinner chief residents would be welcomed into her home and given the opportunity to speak with leading experts in the medical field. This tradition lasted for three decades. Olga Jonasson died at Northwestern Memorial Hospital of T-cell lymphoma, on August 30, 2006. At the time, few of her friends and colleague knew she was sick because she was known for not complaining about her own personal issues. She was survived by her two sisters.

== Awards and acclamations ==
- Honorary member of the American College of Black Academic Surgeons (now The Society of Black Academic Surgeons) for her work mentoring minority surgeons.
- 1971: Outstanding Educator in America Award
- 1988: Honorary Fellow of the Royal College of Surgeons of England
- 2002: Elizabeth Blackwell Medal
