= Nieuwezijds Voorburgwal =

Street in Amsterdam

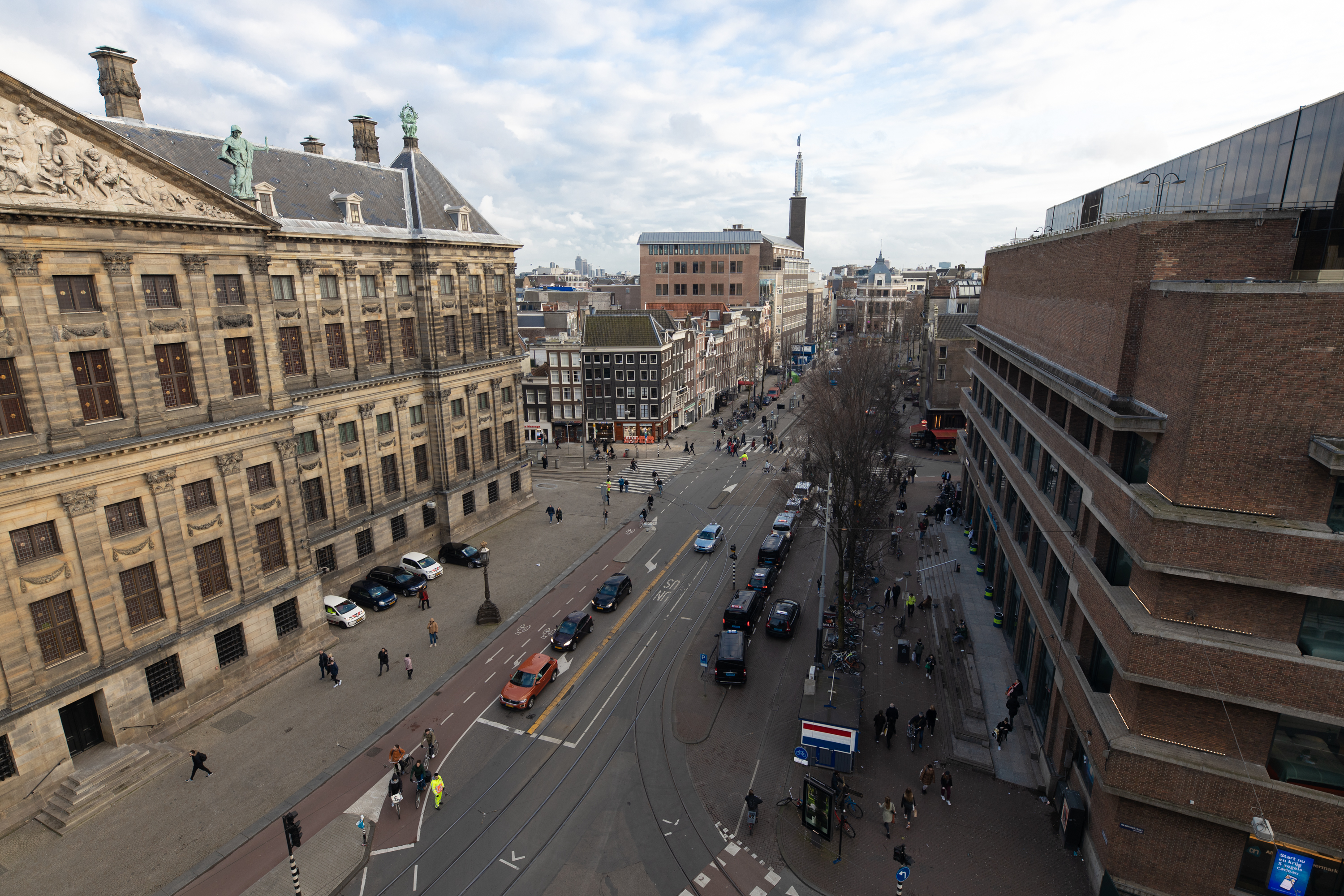

- Location within Amsterdam
- Location: Amsterdam, Netherlands
- Coordinates: 52.37365662663735°N 4.890814097456198°E

The Nieuwezijds Voorburgwal (Dutch pronunciation: [ˌniuəzɛitsˈfoːrbʏr(ə)xʋɑl]) is a street in the centre of Amsterdam. The street runs north-south without intersecting major streets other than the intersection with Raadhuisstraat at its halfway point, right behind the Royal Palace. On the eastern side, it has a number of alleys connecting to Kalverstraat and Nieuwendijk.

== Name ==
The street name means 'New Side Front Bastion Wall'. In the 14th century, the city of Amsterdam was equally divided into two parts, each on one side of the River Amstel. To defend the city against intruders, a canal with a bastion wall (burgwal) was built. The burgwal protecting the oldest of the two sides was called the Old Side Bastion Wall. The bastion wall at the new side was called the New Side Bastion Wall. When in 1385 a new bastion wall was built with a canal—behind the old bastion walls—those were now called New Side Behind Bastion Wall and Old Side Behind Bastion Wall. The original bastion walls were then renamed as New Side Front Bastion Wall and Old Side Front Bastion Wall. In Dutch, these names are often written as compounds, hence the rather long names for these four canal streets: Nieuwezijds Achterburgwal, Nieuwezijds Voorburgwal, Oudezijds Voorburgwal, and Oudezijds Achterburgwal. When the canals of the new side bastion walls of Nieuwezijds Voorburgwal and Nieuwezijds Achterburgwal were filled in, the latter was renamed Spuistraat, after Spui which both streets connect to. Nieuwezijds Voorburgwal kept its name.

== Traffic ==
Where the canal used to flow tram tracks were laid after the filling in. Nieuwezijds Voorburgwal is now one of two main axes carrying trams towards Central Station. It has tram stops at Raadhuisstraat, called Dam, and at Nieuwezijds Kolk. It used to also be a major route for regional buses before the city decided to decrease the number of buses running through the historic city centre. In 1996 the southern part from Roskamsteeg to Spui was converted to one-way traffic in the northward direction for private motor vehicles. In 2018 a new traffic plan went into effect making the southern part of the street and Spuistraat only accessible from Raadhuisstraat, cutting off private motor vehicle connections past Spui to Singel and Muntplein, thereby creating a loop. The northern part of Nieuwezijds Voorburgwal, parallel-running Spuistraat, and their connecting street of Martelaarsgracht were turned into one-way southward traffic from Prins Hendrikkade to Raadhuisstraat. The new traffic plan made a large-scale renovation of the street possible where more space was dedicated to cycling and pedestrian infrastructure and greenery rather than on-street parking and several lanes of motor traffic.

== Notable locations ==
Halfway along the southern part of Nieuwezijds Voorburgwal the street curves westwards. At that location the buildings on both sides of the streets are slightly recessed, creating a somewhat larger space, formerly used as a parking lot and colloquially called Postzegelmarkt (Post Stamp Market), named after collector markets that used to be held here.

Nieuwezijds Voorburgwal contains a number of notable buildings, including the Royal Palace of Amsterdam, the Nieuwe Kerk, the Amsterdam Museum and the former main post office which is now the Magna Plaza. Across from the royal palace on the corner with Raadhuisstraat W Hotel can be found housed in a 1930s telegraphy building. Central Amsterdam's police station can be found on Nieuwezijds Voorburgwal at Nieuwezijds Kolk. Dutch psychiatrist Tina Strobos, who rescued over 100 Jewish refugees from the Holocaust during World War II, lived with her family at Nieuwezijds Voorburgwal 282.

== Gallery ==
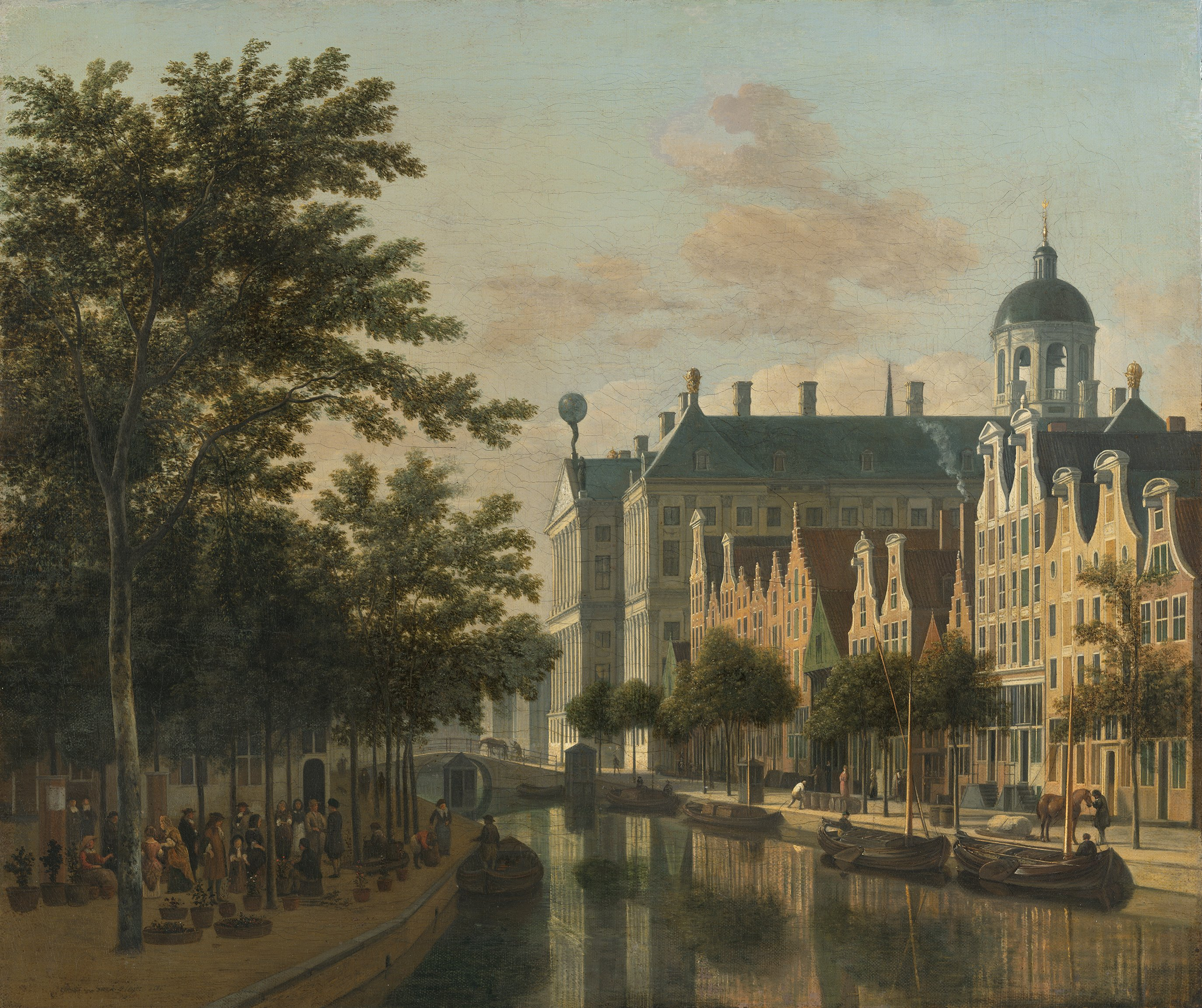
A view of the city hall from Nieuwezijds Voorburgwal by Gerrit Adriaenszoon Berckheyde, 1686

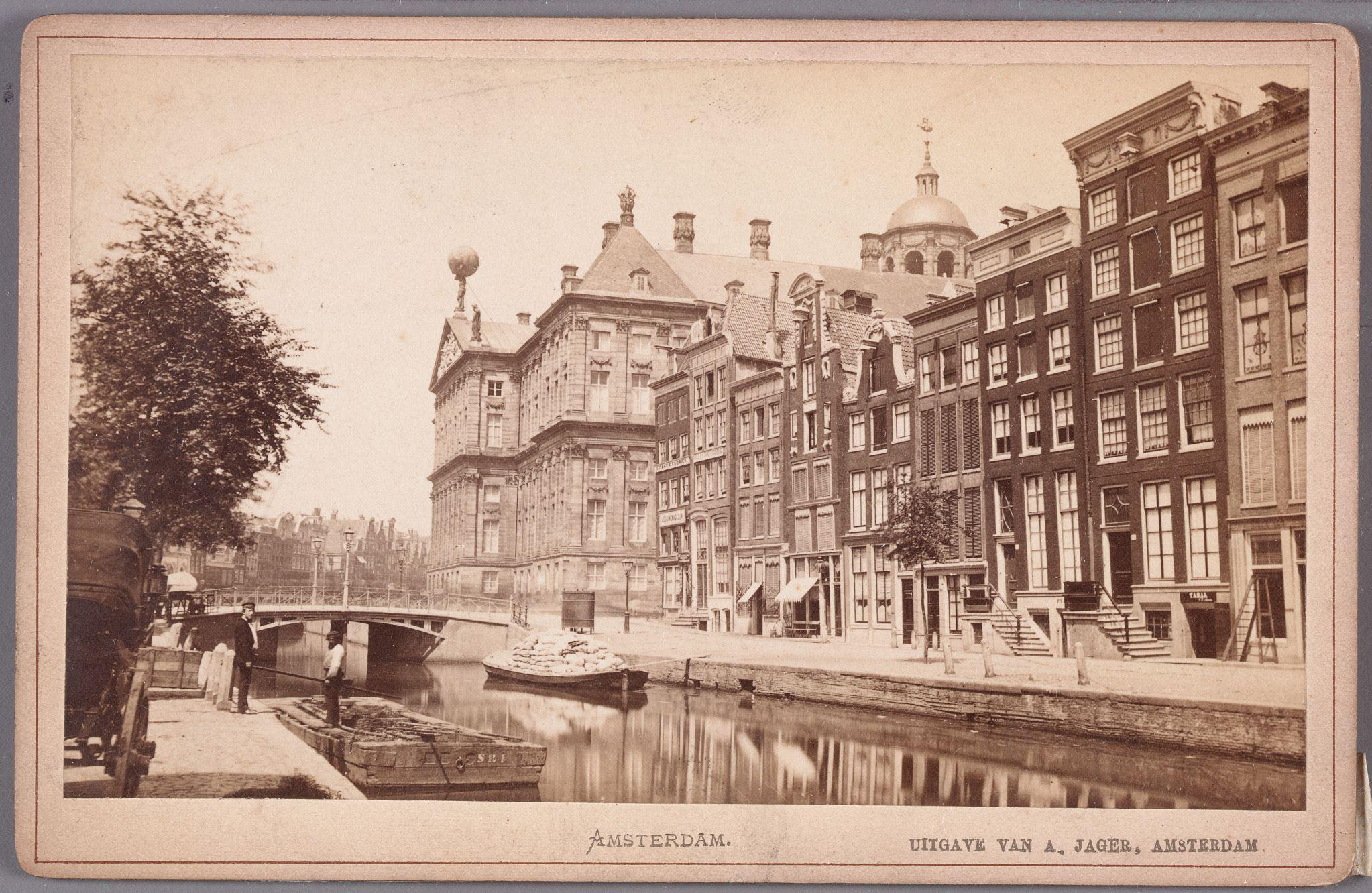
Nieuwezijds Voorburgwal before filling in the canal

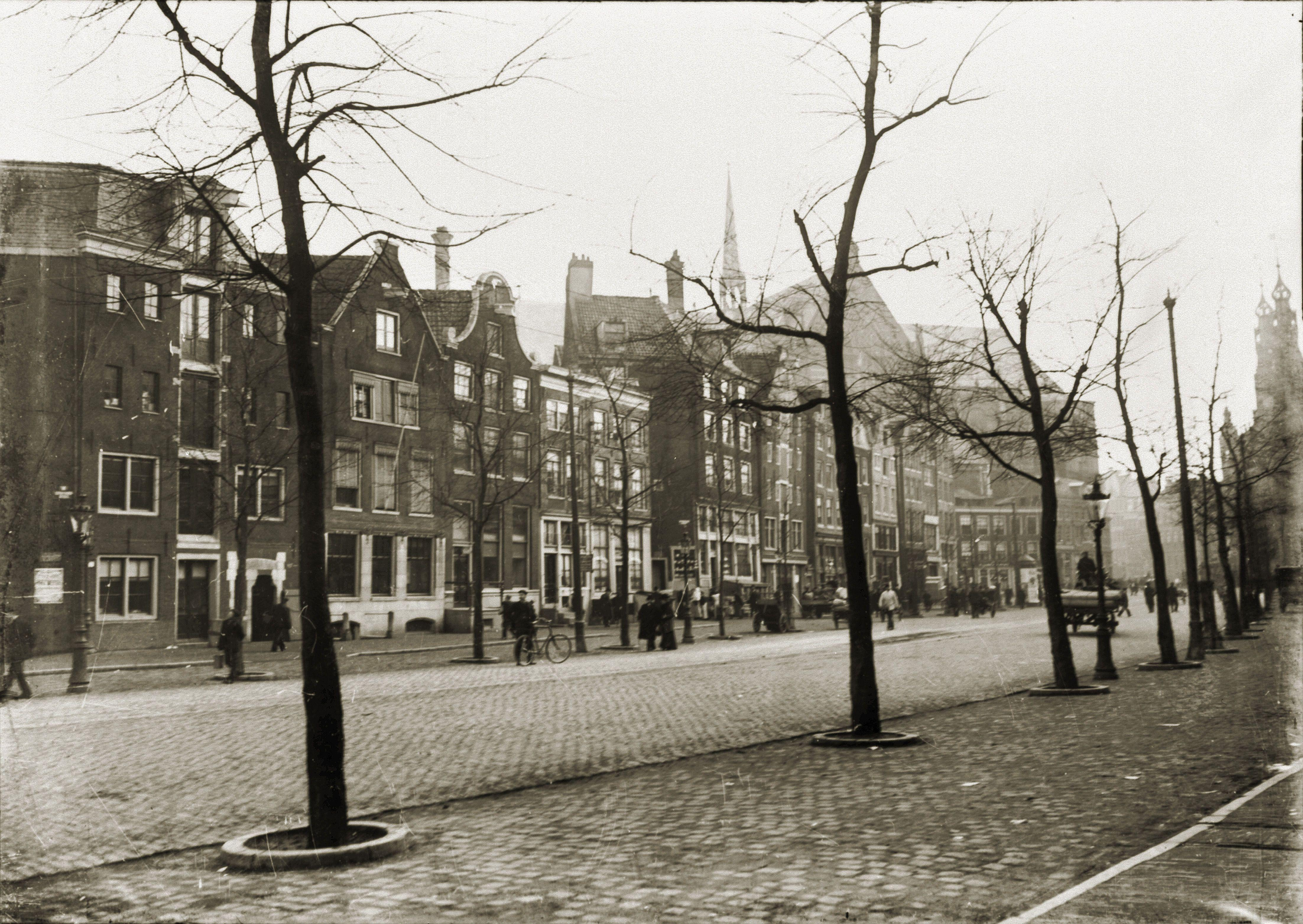
View towards Nieuwe Kerk after the canal has been filled in, circa 1900 by George Hendrik Breitner

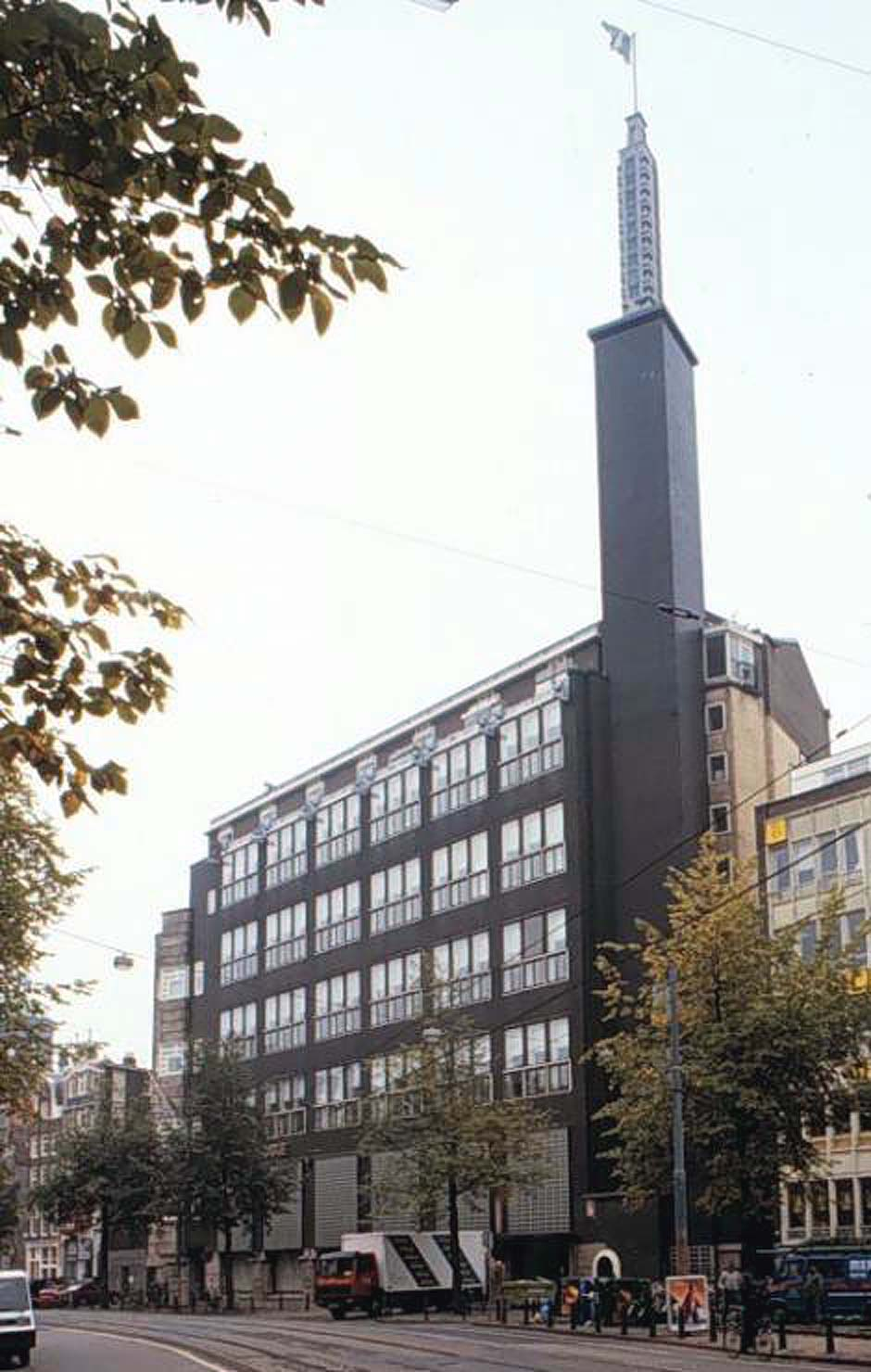
Former De Telegraaf head office and printing press building

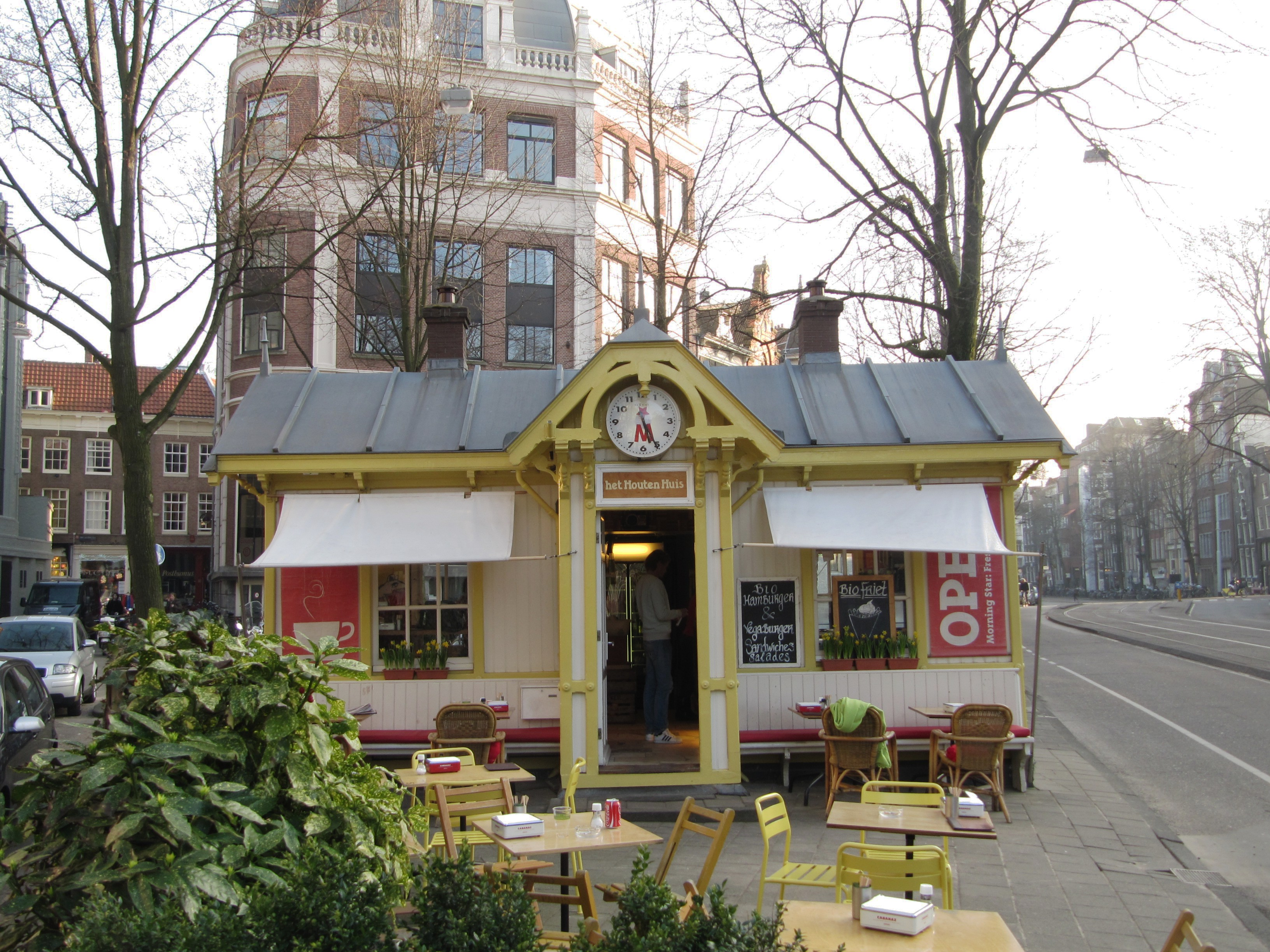
A former police outpost at Postzegelmarkt

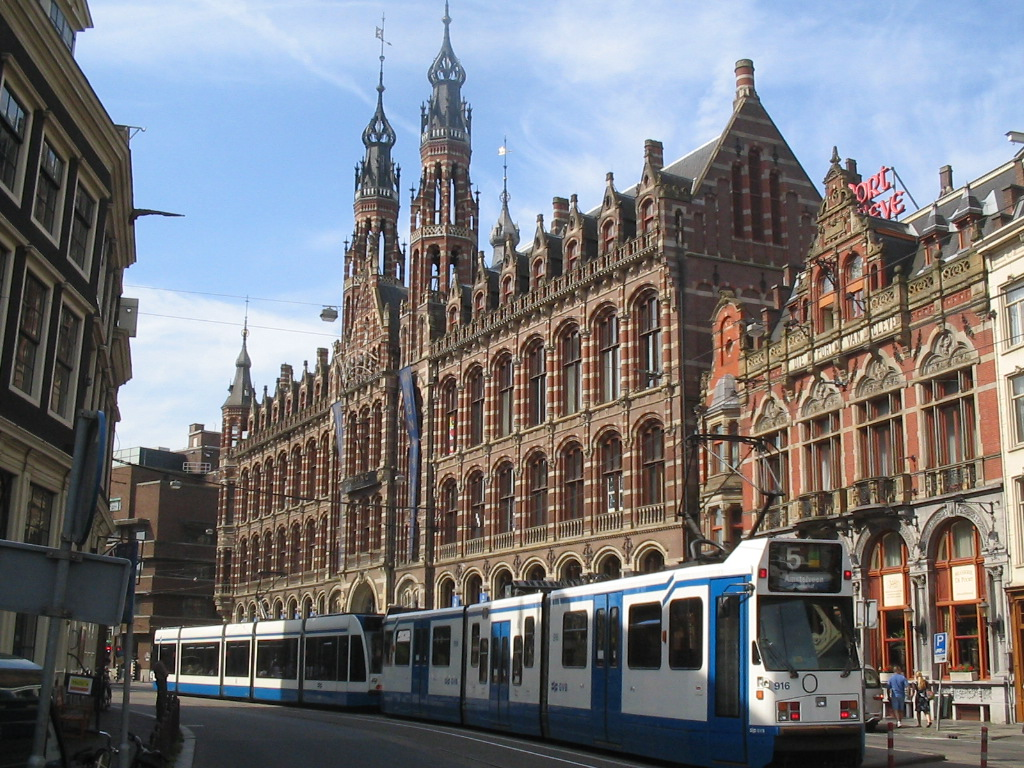
The old post office, now Magna Plaza
