= Florida State University College of Medicine =

Medical school of Florida State University

College of Medicine
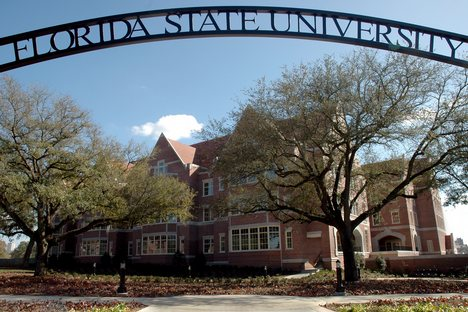
- Type: Medical School
- Established: 2000; 26 years ago
- Affiliation: Florida State University
- Dean: Alma Littles
- Students: 532
- Location: Tallahassee, Florida, U.S. 30°26′44.0″N 84°18′19.9″W
- Website: www.med.fsu.edu

The Florida State University College of Medicine, located in Tallahassee, Florida, is one of sixteen colleges composing the Florida State University. The college, created in 2000, is an accredited medical school, offering the Doctor of Medicine (M.D.) degree for physicians. The College of Medicine also offers a Ph.D. degree and a Physician Assistant program.

As of 31 December 2017, the school had 471 students, of which 465 were Florida residents, 135 were underrepresented minorities, and 195 were minority students. There were 224 men and 247 women.

== Accreditation ==
The College of Medicine is the first new medical school of the century to be reaccredited. The college was reaccredited in 2011 for the maximum eight years by the Liaison Committee on Medical Education. Also in 2011, it was reaccredited by the Accreditation Council for Graduate Medical Education. That means it can continue to be a sponsoring institution for residency programs.

== Academics ==
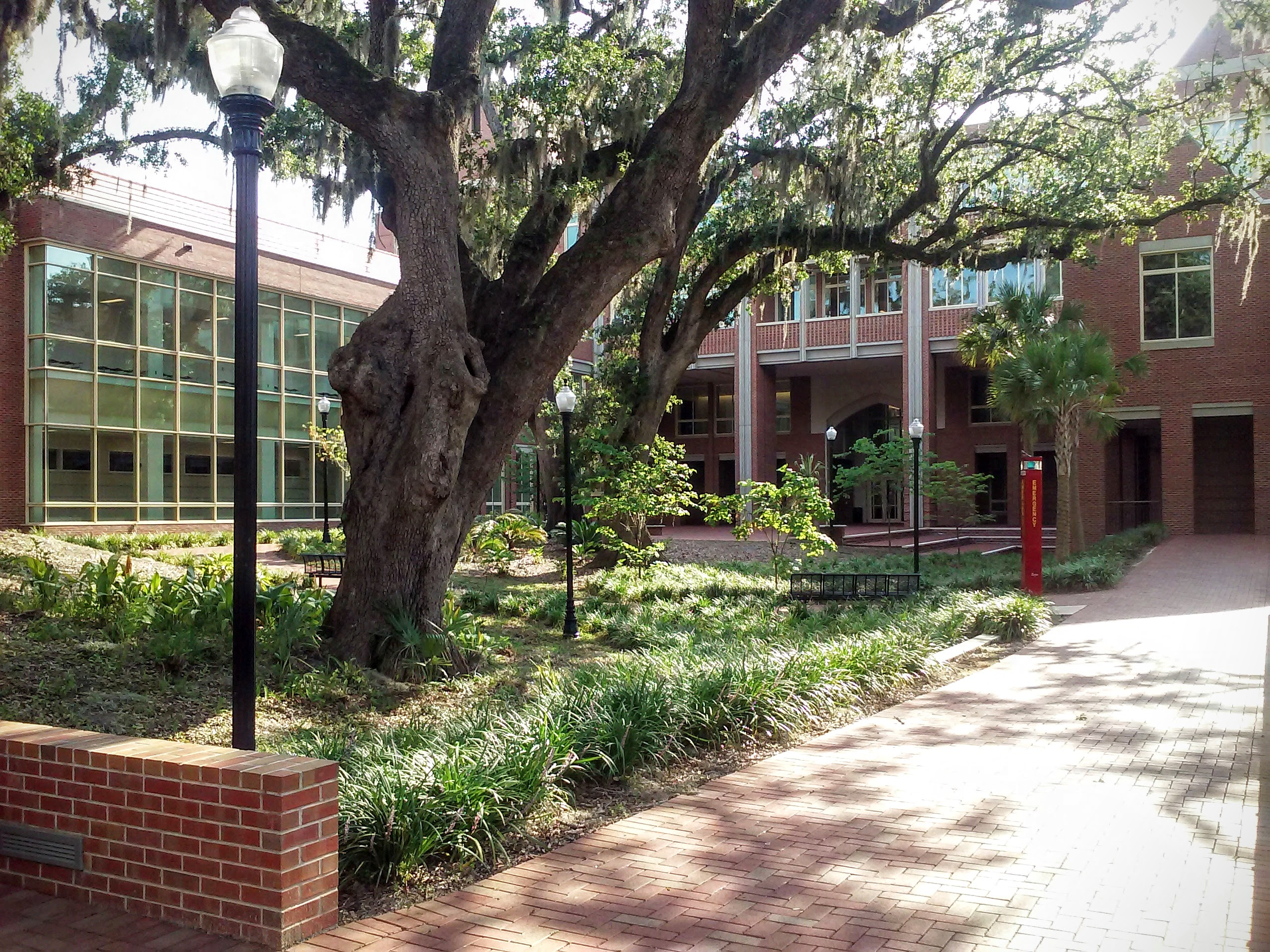
Health and Wellness Center

The five departments are:

- Behavioral Sciences & Social Medicine
- Biomedical Sciences
- Clinical Sciences
- Family Medicine & Rural Health
- Geriatrics

=== Residency programs ===
The College of Medicine has established an internal medicine residency at Sarasota Memorial Hospital. The College of Medicine has also collaborated with Sacred Heart Hospital in Pensacola, Florida to provide an obstetrics & gynecology and pediatrics residency. It developed a Family Medicine Residency Program at Lee Memorial Health System in Fort Myers, Florida. The College of Medicine offers a Dermatology residency as well as a procedural dermatology fellowship program with Dermatology Associates in Tallahassee. The College of Medicine has announced their newest residency program in emergency medicine in collaboration with the Sarasota Memorial Health Care System, for which they expect to be accepting their first residents in July 2019.

On February 12, 2018, Florida State University's College of Medicine announced the establishment of its 5th residency program in collaboration with Winter Haven Hospital which will acquire 18 residents each year.

=== Fellowship programs ===
The Florida State University College of Medicine has two fellowship programs: family medicine global health at Lee Health, and micrographic surgery and dermatology oncology at Dermatology Associates of Tallahassee.

=== School of Physician Assistant Practice ===
The program has received provisional accreditation from the Accreditation Review Commission on Education for the Physician Assistant. The College of Medicine welcomed their first class of 40 PA students in August 2017. 50 students have been accepted to the second class and the program anticipates accepting a maximum of 60 students to their third class.

== Campuses ==
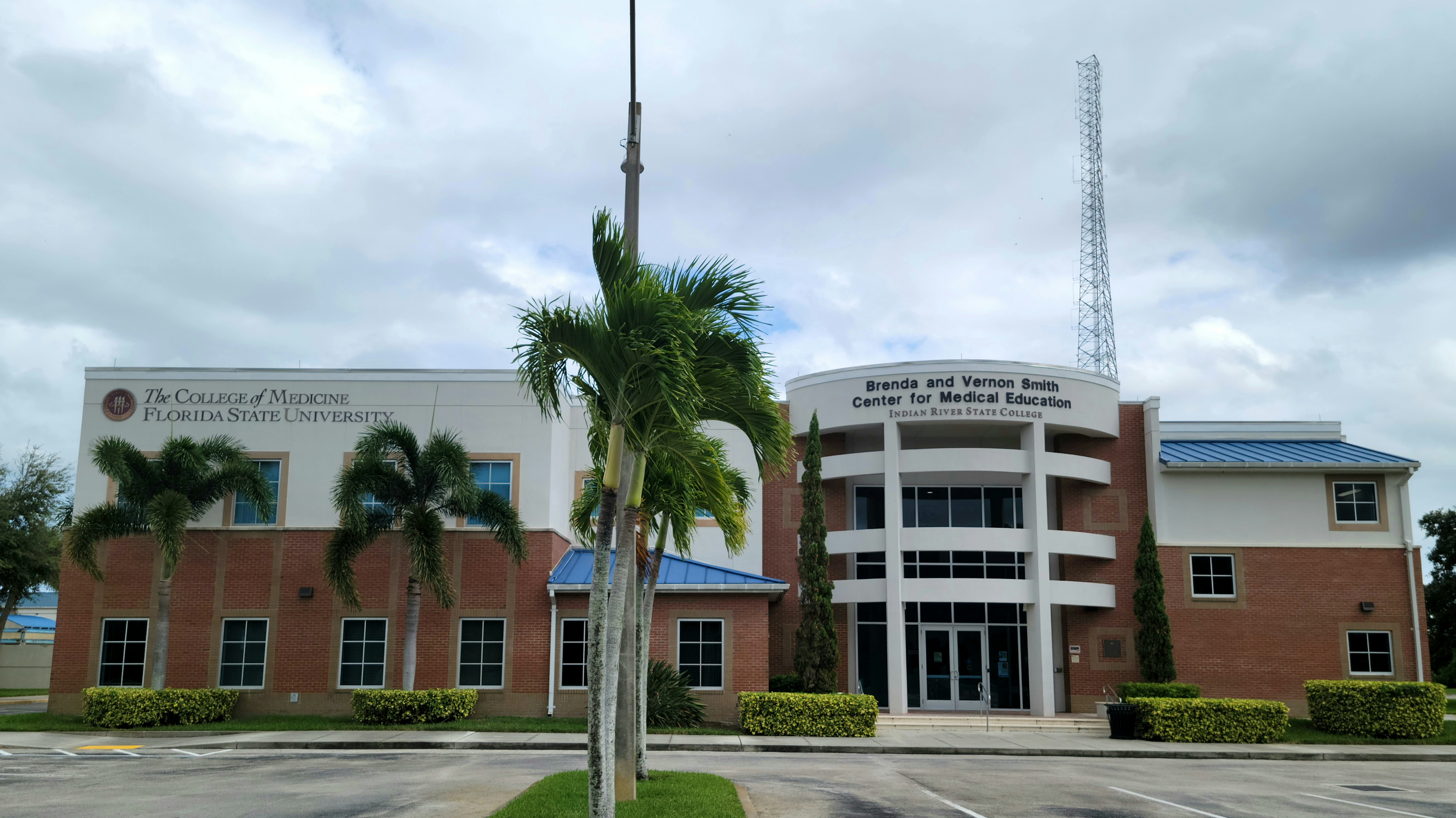
Regional Medical Center at the Massey campus of Indian River State College in Fort Pierce, Florida.

Students complete their first two years at the college's main campus in Tallahassee, which consists of a combination of traditional classroom instruction, as well as simulated clinical training at their Clinical Learning Center (CLC). At the CLC, medical students learn interviewing and physical exam skills by working with standardized patients in a simulated clinical environment. Adult and infant interactive mannequins are also utilized to simulate a variety of clinical scenarios, such as a heart attack or an asthma exacerbation, so that students can learn to determine and apply the appropriate treatment in a no-risk environment.

The Florida State University College of Medicine provides third- and fourth-year clinical training at regional medical school campuses in Orlando, Pensacola, Sarasota, Tallahassee, Ft. Pierce, and Daytona Beach, Florida. There are rural training sites in Marianna and Immokalee, Florida, in addition to Thomasville, Georgia. It is during these years that students work under the one-on-one supervision and instruction of local physicians at affiliated outpatient clinics and hospitals, through which they are actively involved in direct patient care.

== National rankings ==
In 2020, the U.S. News & Report ranked the FSU College of Medicine first out of the top 10 medical schools with the lowest acceptance rates.
