= Eliza Lo Chin =

American internist (born 1967)

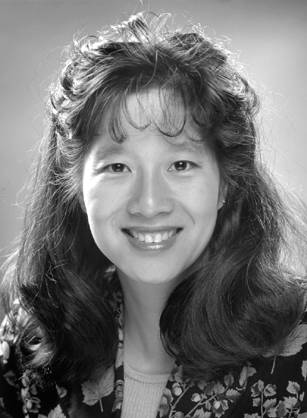
- Born: 1967 (age 58–59)
- Education: University of California, Berkeley; Harvard Medical School; Columbia University
- Children: 3
- Scientific career
- Fields: Internal medicine, women's health, geriatrics
- Workplaces: Columbia University Irving Medical Center; University of California, San Francisco

Eliza Lo Chin (born 1967) is an American internist with an interest in women's health. She is an assistant clinical professor of medicine at the University of California, San Francisco and the executive director of the American Medical Women's Association (AMWA). Chin was president of AMWA from 2010 to 2011. In 2002, she edited the anthology, This Side of Doctoring: Reflections From Women in Medicine.

== Early life and education ==
Chin was born in 1967. She earned a B.A. with honors in biochemistry from the University of California, Berkeley, in 1989. After graduating from Harvard Medical School in 1993, she completed an internal medicine residency with the Primary Care Program at Brigham and Women's Hospital. Chin earned a M.P.H. at the Columbia University Mailman School of Public Health.

== Career ==
In 1997, Chin was appointed assistant clinical professor of medicine at Columbia University Irving Medical Center. She also served as assistant attending physician at NewYork-Presbyterian Hospital, and course director for the Women's Health Elective at Columbia University College of Physicians and Surgeons. For her work on women's issues in medicine, Chin was nominated for the New York branch of the American Medical Women's Association's (AMWA) Outstanding Woman Physician Award for the year 2000.

In August 2000, Chin moved with her family to Northern California, where her husband, Douglas Chin, completed a fellowship in hand surgery. It was during this time that she became interested in the unique issues faced by women in medicine, particularly the challenge of balancing work and family, and she began collecting the other women's stories. Chin has three children.

A general internist with an interest in women's health, Chin draws inspiration from her female colleagues who combine family responsibilities with a career in medicine. She has collected their experiences in her anthology, This Side of Doctoring: Reflections From Women in Medicine, published in 2002. The idea for the book, she says, "was borne out of a personal need for mentoring. Being a young mother, physician, and wife, I found myself perpetually struggling to achieve some semblance of balance in my life. As a clinician-educator at Columbia University, I frequently encountered medical students and residents contemplating these very same issues. Yet how had other women physicians managed to structure their lives so admirably? Surely my situation was hardly unique, despite the realities of having two young children and a surgical resident husband. Thus the notion of collecting written experiences began to take shape." In 2003, Chin was featured in the United States National Library of Medicine's exhibition, Changing the Face of Medicine.

Chin is an assistant clinical professor of medicine at the University of California, San Francisco. From 2010 to 2011, she was president of the AMWA. She practices part-time with a focus on geriatrics. As of 2018, she is the executive director of the AMWA.
