= Leah J. Dickstein =

American psychiatrist (1934–2019)

- Born: August 17, 1934; Brooklyn, New York, US
- Died: December 16, 2019 (aged 85)
- Spouse: Herbert Dickstein (m. 1955)
- Awards: Elizabeth Blackwell Medal

Academic background
- Education: BA, MA, education, Brooklyn College; MD, University of Louisville School of Medicine

Leah Joan Dickstein (nee Chernoble; August 17, 1934 – December 16, 2019) was an American psychiatrist. She was the president of the American Medical Women's Association, Vice President of the American Psychiatric Association, and Founder and President of the Association of Women Psychiatrists.

== Early life and education ==
Dickstein was born on August 17, 1934, in Brooklyn, New York, to Russian-Jewish parents William David Chernoble and Sadye Rebecca Engelman. Her father was a printing press operator and her mother was a school teacher. Growing up she wished to become a psychiatrist after helping her mother through depression, but was discouraged from considering medical school by her advisor who did not believe she was scientifically gifted. She graduated from Erasmus Hall High School at the age of 16 and enrolled at Brooklyn College for her Bachelor of Arts degree and Master of Education degree. Following this, she married medical-student Herbert Dickstein in 1955 and travelled with him to medical school in Ghent, Belgium due to restrictive quotas for Jewish people. While in Belgium, she juggled seven jobs to support him, including selling girdles, and took Flemish-language courses in psychiatry and criminology. Despite not speaking the language, she passed the psychiatry course for no credit.

Upon returning to the Brooklyn, Dickstein accepted a position as a school teacher in Greenpoint, Brooklyn. In 1966, after six years working as a sixth-grade teacher, she chose to enroll in medical school. Dickstein attended night school for credits and only received three acceptance letters out of 22 schools she applied to over two years. She did not begin medical school until the age of 32. She originally accepted enrollment at Meharry Medical College but opted to join the University of Louisville School of Medicine after a spot opened up at the last moment. She attended the Institute for her entire degree and graduated in 1970 as one of only six women in a class of over 120. Throughout her time at the University of Louisville Dickstein was also busy raising her three sons. While she cared deeply about her studies she was adamant about making time for her children, reserving Saturdays and summer months for family time.

== Career ==
After interning in Louisville, Dickstein took off six months to have a second son before returning to the University of Louisville School of Medicine as a professor. She established the first University of Louisville student mental health service in 1975 before it was eliminated six years later. In spite of its dismantlement, she established a health-awareness laboratory course for freshmen medical students on a volunteer basis and an elective class for sophomores. Her concept, the Health Awareness Workshop Program, was recognized in 1987 with the H. Charles Grawemeyer Award for Instructional Development.

Dickstein was appointed associate dean for Faculty and Student Advocacy from 1989 through 2002 when she retired from full-time employment. In her role as associate dean, she designed several elective classes including ones focused on AIDS and substance-abuse education. Dickstein was recognized for her efforts in the medical field with the election as president of the American Medical Women's Association in 1992. It was during that time that the Leah J. Dickstein, M.D., Award was established by the Association of Women Psychiatrists, to reward female students who embody the features that Dickstein wanted to cultivate. During her tenure at Louisville, Dickstein was named to numerous organizations including vice president of the American Psychiatric Association, president of the Association of Women Psychiatrists, and president of the Kentucky Psychiatric Association. In 1998, Dickstein was one of five women honored by the Center for Women and Families as a "Woman of Distinction".

Dickstein died on December 16, 2019, in Cambridge, Massachusetts.
