= Tina Strobos =

Dutch resistance member (1920–2012)

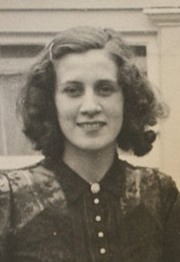
- Strobos in 1941
- Born: Tineke Buchter; May 19, 1920; Amsterdam, Netherlands
- Died: February 27, 2012 (aged 91); Rye, New York, US
- Education: University of Amsterdam
- Occupation: Psychiatrist
- Known for: Rescuing over 100 Jewish Holocaust refugees during World War II
- Spouses: Robert Strobos (c. 1947–1964); Walter Chudson (1967–2002)
- Children: 3 children and 2 stepchildren
- Parent(s): Marie Schotte and Alphonse Buchter
- Awards: Elizabeth Blackwell Medal
- Honors: Righteous Among the Nations

Tina Strobos (née Tineke Buchter; May 19, 1920 – February 27, 2012) was a Dutch physician and psychiatrist from Amsterdam, known for her resistance work during World War II. While a young medical student, she worked with her mother and grandmother to rescue more than 100 Jewish refugees as part of the Dutch resistance during the Nazi occupation of the Netherlands. Strobos provided her house as a hiding place for Jews on the run, using a secret attic compartment and warning bell system to keep them safe from sudden police raids. In addition, Strobos smuggled guns and radios for the resistance and forged passports to help refugees escape the country. Despite being arrested and interrogated nine times by the Gestapo, she never betrayed the whereabouts of a Jew.

After the war, Strobos completed her medical degree and became a psychiatrist. She studied under Anna Freud in England. Strobos later emigrated to the United States to study psychiatry under a Fulbright scholarship, and she subsequently settled in New York. She married twice and had three children. Strobos built a career as a family psychiatrist, receiving the Elizabeth Blackwell Medal in 1998 for her medical work, and finally retired from active practice in 2009.

In 1989, Strobos was honored as Righteous Among the Nations by Yad Vashem for her rescue work. In 2009, she was recognized for her efforts by the Holocaust and Human Rights Education Center of New York City.

== Early life ==
Tina Strobos was born Tineke Buchter on May 19, 1920, in Amsterdam. Her parents, Marie Schotte and Alphonse Buchter, were socialist atheists and fluent in four languages. Schotte supported the women's peace movement. Strobos' maternal grandfather founded a freethinking movement, and her maternal grandmother had been part of the labor movement in the late nineteenth century. The family had a history of offering shelter to those in need: Strobos' parents had previously taken in refugees from earlier conflicts, while Strobos' grandmother had sheltered Belgian refugees during World War I.

When Strobos was ten years old, her parents divorced. She lived with her mother.

By the age of sixteen, Strobos had decided she wanted to become a psychiatrist. At university, she began studying medicine, but her studies were interrupted after Germany invaded the Netherlands in 1940.

== World War II resistance work ==
When the Germans invaded the Netherlands in May 1940, Strobos was living with her mother and their maid in Amsterdam. She was about to turn twenty. University students were ordered to sign an oath of loyalty to Hitler, but Strobos and her classmates refused to sign. The medical school was subsequently shut down, and Strobos and many other students joined the underground movement.

=== Safehouse and secret compartment ===
Strobos began her rescue work by hiding her best friend, a Jewish girl named Tirtsah Van Amerongen. Family friend Henri Polak—a socialist writer and labor leader—also decided to go into hiding, and Strobos' grandmother agreed to help him.

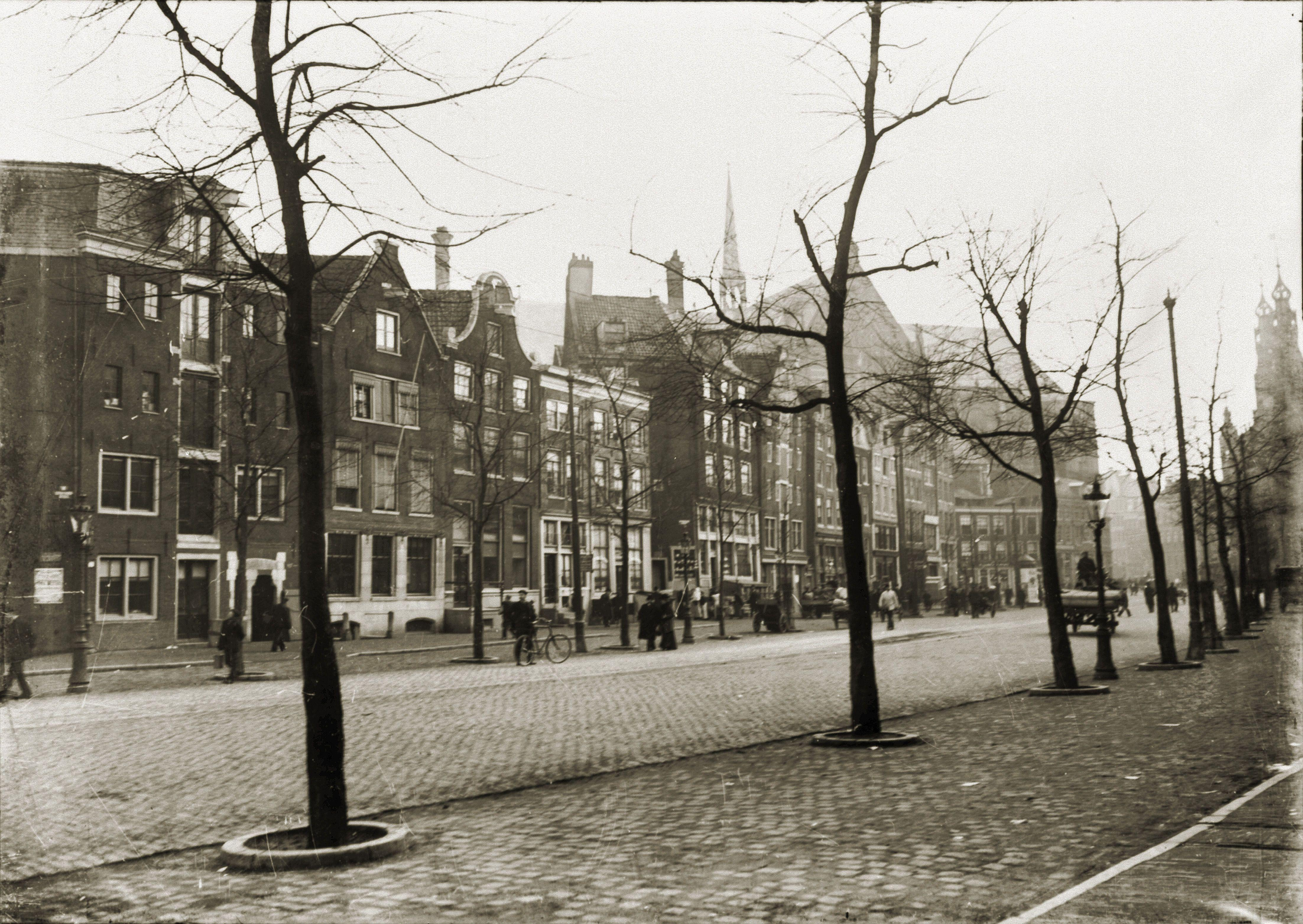
The Amsterdam street Nieuwezijds Voorburgwal where Strobos' house was located (photo c.1906–1910)

Working with her mother and grandmother throughout the war, Strobos rescued over 100 Jewish refugees by hiding them four or five at a time in the family's boarding house at 282 Nieuwezijds Voorburgwal. The house had once been a city school and had three floors. Once Strobos and her mother started hiding refugees, a carpenter from the Dutch underground arrived at their house and constructed a small hiding place in the attic. The secret compartment was located inside a gable. Although the Gestapo raided the house eight times, they never found this secret compartment. Strobos and her mother had a warning bell system installed in the house, which they used to warn refugees on the upper floors of unexpected Gestapo visits. If the Jews had no time to hide in the secret compartment, they could escape through the window to an adjoining building. The family was also assisted by an anonymous ally at the Gestapo headquarters, who sometimes phoned them to warn of an impending Nazi raid. They never learned the identity of this ally.

Although some Jews stayed at their house for extended periods, Strobos and her mother mostly used their house as a temporary safe space, sheltering Jews for a short time until they could be moved to a safer refuge. Some refugees were smuggled to Spain, Switzerland, or the Dutch countryside. Strobos and her mother often visited the people that they had arranged hiding places for, cycling miles out into the countryside to provide isolated refugees with valuable news and conversation. Among the refugees Strobos helped was impressionist painter Martin Monnickendam, who painted her portrait and gifted it to her. She kept the painting well into her old age.

The Strobos residence was only a ten-minute walk away from Anne Frank's hiding place at 263 Prinsengracht, Amsterdam. Although Strobos never met the Frank family, she later expressed her vexation at the fact that the Franks had not had an escape route built into their refuge: "If I knew they were there, I would have gotten them out of the country."

=== Gestapo interrogations ===
During the war, Strobos was arrested and interrogated by the Gestapo nine times. During these encounters, Strobos was seized by her wrists and thrown against a wall, and she was once knocked unconscious. She never once betrayed the whereabouts of any Jews. To pass interrogations safely, Strobos learned certain tactics. Despite being fluent in German, she always asked for an interpreter to buy extra time to compose herself. When a Nazi officer commented on her legs, Strobos gained more courage: "I realized that he was just a man and he was interested in my legs. So that gave me a sense of power. I got cocky. I could say 'I didn't know he was a Jew' in a stronger, more convincing way."

=== Abraham Pais ===
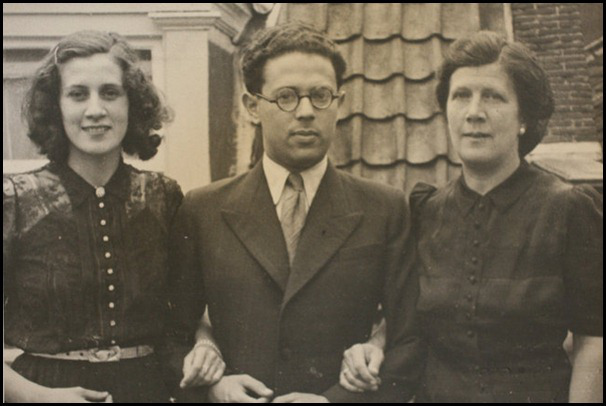
Tina Strobos (left), her fiancé Abraham Pais, and her mother Marie Schotte, c. 1941

During the early years of the war, Strobos was engaged to Abraham "Bram" Pais, a young Jewish particle physicist. She and her mother found hiding places for Pais and many of his relatives. Although they ended their engagement in 1943, Strobos and Pais remained friends.

In February 1945, Pais was hiding in an apartment with three Jewish friends: Tirtsah Van Amerongen, her sister Jeanne, and Jeanne's husband, Lion Nordheim. One of Pais' ex-girlfriends betrayed them, and all were arrested. When Strobos heard the news, she found the Gestapo official in charge and persuaded him to let Tirtsah and Jeanne go free, but she could not do the same for Lion. Rescuing Pais required a more complicated plan. Strobos had in her possession a letter from well-known physicist Niels Bohr, who had previously invited Pais to study with him in Denmark. Strobos took this letter directly to a high-ranking German official and asked him to free Pais, describing him as "a young genius in physics" who would go on to do great things. After making some phone calls, the official ordered Pais to be released. Pais later became a noted nuclear physicist and biographer, recording the life stories of Niels Bohr and Albert Einstein.

=== Other resistance activities ===
Strobos and her mother also hid critical members of the Dutch underground movement, including resistance leader Johan Brouwer. Brouwer's resistance group Binnenlandse Strydkrachten did militant work such as smuggling weapons and building bombs. At the beginning of her work for the Dutch resistance, Strobos smuggled weapons, radios, and explosives, traveling up to fifty miles with the contraband hidden in her bicycle basket. She brought news and ration stamps to Jews hiding on farms outside the city, as well as radios and firearms for the Dutch resistance. Sometimes, Strobos hid large boxes of guns in her house. As the resistance movement became increasingly violent, Strobos shifted her focus toward helping Jews escape. She also worked with the less militant Landelyke Organizatie (Country Organization) to shelter refugees and forge passports.

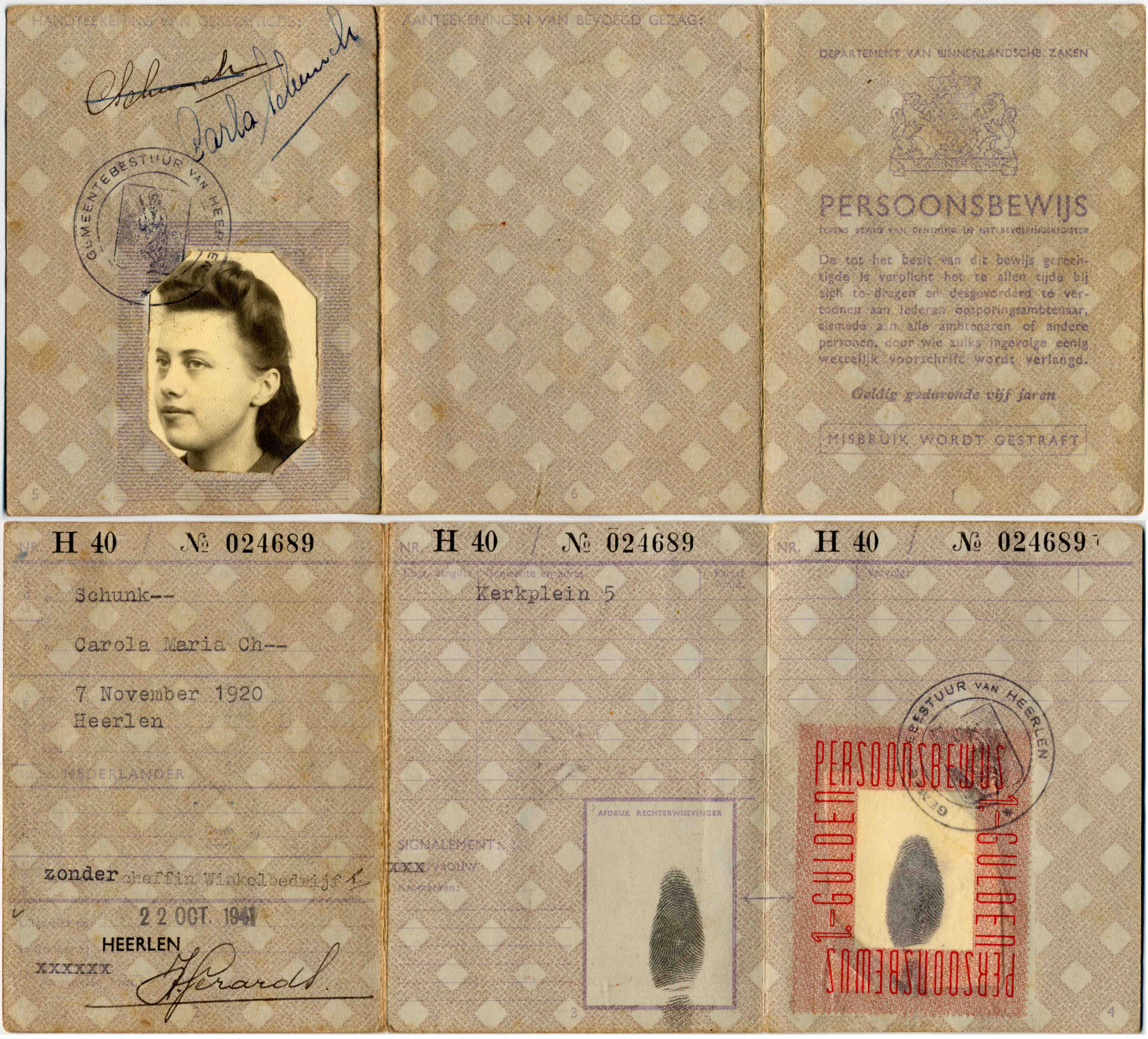
An example of Dutch identity paperwork during World War II

To forge paperwork to help Jews flee the country, Strobos stole identity cards from non-Jewish people at social gatherings, and replaced the photos and fingerprints with those of her Jewish refugees. She sometimes resorted to other measures to get the papers she needed: Strobos asked pickpockets to steal identity cards from travelers at train stations, and in 1941, she stole passports from the coat pockets of guests at her aunt's funeral.

Strobos' maternal grandmother, Marie Schotte Abrahams, had a radio transmitter hidden in her house, which was used to send encoded messages from the Dutch underground to the BBC in Britain. She kept this radio despite the Germans declaring a death penalty for any Dutch citizen guilty of hiding radio equipment. On one occasion, when a Nazi visited Abrahams's house and tried to interrogate her, she grasped his arm, looked him in the eye, and asked, "Did I not see you looting a Persian rug out of the Mendlessohns' apartment next door a few nights ago?" The Nazi officer collected his things and left quickly. Strobos later said of her grandmother: "She is the only person I know who scared the Gestapo."

Despite the closure of universities, Strobos continued to study medicine during the war. She sometimes offered her house as a meeting place for underground medical classes, hosting up to eighteen students every week. The local hospital allowed small groups of students to study pathology. She was taking her pharmacology exam at her professor's house in May 1945 and was interrupted when the Canadian Army arrived to liberate the Netherlands officially, and everyone raced outside to watch the tanks and soldiers come through the city gates.

== Post-war career and honors ==
After the war ended, Strobos obtained her medical degree from the University of Amsterdam in 1946 and went on to study psychiatry in London, England with Anna Freud. During the 1950s, Strobos went to Valhalla, New York, to undertake a residency in psychiatry and neurology at Westchester Medical Center. She studied child psychiatry with the support of a Fulbright scholarship.

Strobos built a career as a family psychiatrist, with a special focus on working with the mentally impaired. She received the Elizabeth Blackwell Medal for her work as a medical professional in 1998, and finally retired from active practice in 2009.

In 1989, Strobos and her mother, Marie Schotte, were officially recognized as Righteous Among the Nations by Yad Vashem. In 2009, Strobos was honored for her rescue work by the Holocaust and Human Rights Education Center of New York City. When asked in interviews about why she had risked her life to save others, Strobos said, "It's the right thing to do... Your conscience tells you to do it. I believe in heroism, and when you're young, you want to do dangerous things."

== Family and personal life ==
Strobos' first husband was Robert Strobos, a neurologist. They traveled to the West Indies in 1947, where Tina worked as a practicing psychiatrist for two years. After divorcing Robert in 1964, Tina Strobos later married economist Walter Chudson in 1967. Chudson was an American Jew who worked for the United Nations. Strobos and Chudson settled down in Larchmont, New York, and they stayed together until his death in 2002.

Strobos had two sons and one daughter from her first marriage, and two stepchildren from her second marriage. Her two sons became a physician and a paramedic, while her daughter became a psychoanalyst. At the time of her death, Strobos had seven grandchildren and two step-grandchildren.

== Death ==
Strobos died of cancer, aged 91, on February 27, 2012, in Rye, New York.
