= Faculty development =

The term faculty development is used similarly to staff development and professional development, in settings that pertain to educators.

Professional development for educators may include teacher training, and is usually considered pre-service, or before beginning teaching. However faculty development and professional development may both be used to refer to ongoing professional learning for educators. Such learning may take place during work hours, such as "in-service" within K-12 settings, or it may be beyond work hours. These learning pursuits may be for credit or noncredit; therefore they may be with a college or university, through a school district, or private consulting agency. Additionally educators may pursue self-directed learning professional development, although the term faculty development is less commonly applied to this scope of activity.

K-12 faculty development and professional development and higher education faculty development and professional development have very different traditions, practices and terminologies. Higher education faculty development is beginning to take place not just face-to-face but also online. Facilitated workshops, either in person or online, are the dominant forms of faculty development for instructors. Topics often include improving course design, learning assessment techniques, and innovative pedagogy.

Many higher education institutions in the United States have a center devoted to faculty development because faculty development is a key priority. Faculty development also is known as "educational development," which includes centers for teaching and learning (CTL). Some colleges and universities also refer to such services as faculty development centers (FDCs). The goals of CTLs and FDCs are diverse. In addition to instructional improvements, goals include faculty career advancement, development of the workplace and classroom climate and community, and graduate student professional development. In addition, some academic units have their own faculty development efforts to advance teaching and learning in their disciplinary, professional or field contexts. Further, academic librarians also have moved into faculty developer roles, bringing library training and experience to effective collaborations that support faculty development.
