= American Medical Women's Association =

Organization of women physicians and medical student

- Formation: 1915
- Type: Professional association
- Location: United States
- Members: 3,000 physicians and medical students
- Official language: English
- President: Connie Baum Newman
- Executive Director: Eliza Lo Chin
- Website: www.amwa-doc.org

The American Medical Women's Association (AMWA) is a professional advocacy and educational organization of women physicians and medical students.

== History ==
The Woman's Medical Journal began publication in the 1893.

As World War I broke out, medical women, though already 6% of the medical profession, faced severe discrimination, as they were barred from the American Medical Association and from the Army Medical Reserve Corps, effectively barring them from military participation as equals to medical men.

In response, the Medical Women’s National Association was founded in 1915 by Bertha Van Hoosen, MD, with the established journal as its official organ. In 1917, the association formed the War Service Committee, later renamed the American Women’s Hospitals Service (AWHS). It was later renamed the American Medical Women's Association. The AMWA works to advance women in medicine and to serve as a voice for women's health.

The association used to publish the Journal of the American Medical Women's Association; the Journal of Women's Health is now the official journal of the AMWA.

== Honors ==
The AMWA honors women physicians each year with four awards.

- The Elizabeth Blackwell Medal, named for Elizabeth Blackwell, the first woman awarded an M.D. from an American medical school, is granted to "a woman physician who has made the most outstanding contributions to the cause of women in the field of medicine."
- The Bertha Van Hoosen Award, named in honor of the Founder and first President of AMWA, honors "a woman physician who has demonstrated exceptional leadership and service to AMWA."
- The Lila A. Wallis Award, named for one of AMWA's Past Presidents, is given to an individual whose lifetime achievements and values reflect those of Wallis.
- The Woman in Science Award is given to a woman physician who "has made exceptional contributions to medical science, especially in women’s health."

The AMWA also established the International Women in Medicine Hall of Fame to recognize contributions made by women in the medical profession. The more than two dozen inductees include the first woman physician, Elizabeth Blackwell; and two former Surgeons General of the United States Antonia Novello and Joycelyn Elders. In 2010, the inductees were Linda A. Randolph, president and CEO of the Developing Families Center, an innovative model for healthcare delivery to poor families; and Diana Zuckerman, a health policy expert who is president of the National Research Center for Women & Families. The latter is the first non-physician inducted.

== Publications ==
The AMWA has published a number of books, primarily in the field of women's health.

- Dell, Diana L.; Judelson, Debra R. (1998). The Women's Complete wellness Book. New York: Golden Books. ISBN 0-307-44062-1.
- American Medical Women's Association (1996). AMWA Guide to Pregnancy and Childbirth. New York: Dell. ISBN 0-440-22246-X.
- American Medical Women's Association (1995). Women's Complete Health Reference. MJF Books. ISBN 1-56731-240-3.
- Stewart, Susan; Epps, Roselyn Payne (1997). Guide to Cardiovascular Health. New York: Dell. ISBN 0-440-22314-8.
- American Medical Women's Association (1995). The AMWA Guide to Emotional Health. New York: Dell. ISBN 0-440-22248-6.
- Stewart, Susan; Epps, Roselyn Payne (1997). Guide to Internal Disorders. New York: Dell. ISBN 0-440-22317-2.
- American Medical Women's Association (1995). The AMWA Guide to Nutrition and Wellness. New York: Dell. ISBN 0-440-22244-3.
- American Medical Women's Association (1996). AMWA Guide to Cancer & Pain Management. New York: Dell. ISBN 0-440-22250-8.
- Donna Shelley; American Red Cross Staff; Lenhart, Sharyn A.; Epps, Roselyn Payne (2001). The Complete Family Health Book. Golden Books. ISBN 0-312-25308-7.
- Epps, Roselyn Payne; Stewart, Susan (1995). The Women's Complete Healthbook. New York: Delacorte Press. ISBN 0-440-50723-5.
