= Squatting =

Unauthorized occupation of property

A symbol used by squatters in Europe

Squatting is the action of occupying an abandoned or unoccupied area of land or a building (usually residential) that the squatter does not own, rent or otherwise have lawful permission to use. Squatting typically occurs when people find empty buildings or land to occupy for housing.

In developing countries and the least developed countries, shanty towns often begin as squatted settlements. In African cities such as Lagos, much of the population lives in slums. There are pavement dwellers in India and in Hong Kong as well as rooftop slums. Informal settlements in Latin America are known by names such as villa miseria (Argentina), pueblos jóvenes (Peru) and asentamientos irregulares (Guatemala, Uruguay). In Brazil, there are favelas in the major cities and land-based movements in rural areas.

In industrialized countries, there are often residential squats and also left-wing squatting movements, which can be anarchist, autonomist or socialist in nature, for example in the United States. Oppositional movements from the 1960s and 1970s created freespaces in Denmark, the Netherlands and the self-managed social centres of Italy. Each local situation determines the context: in England and Wales, there were estimated to be 50,000 squatters in the late 1970s; in Athens, Greece, there are refugee squats. In Spain and the US, the 2010s saw many new squats following the 2008 financial crisis.

== Overview ==
Squatting is a phenomenon that has existed throughout history. The majority of squatting is residential in nature and occurs when a poor and homeless population makes use of derelict property or land through urban homesteading. According to a 2003 estimate by the United Nations Human Settlements Programme (UN-Habitat), there were about one billion people in squatter settlements and slums. According to housing researcher Kesia Reeve, "squatting is largely absent from policy and academic debate and is rarely conceptualised, as a problem, as a symptom, or as a social or housing movement."

In many of the world's poorer countries, there are extensive slums or shanty towns, typically built on the edges of major cities and consisting almost entirely of self-constructed housing built without the landowner's permission. While these settlements may in time become upgraded, they often start off as squats with minimal basic infrastructure. Thus, there is no legal link to sewerage, electricity or water. Such settlements also exist in industrialized countries, such as for example Cañada Real on the outskirts of Madrid.

Squatting can be related to left-wing movements, such as anarchist, autonomist, or socialist. It can be a means to conserve buildings or a protest action. Squats can be used by local communities as free shops, cafés, venues, pirate radio stations or as multi-purpose self-managed social centres. Adverse possession, sometimes described as squatters' rights, is a method of acquiring title to property through possession for a statutory period under certain conditions. Countries where this principle exists include England and the United States, based on common law.

Anarchist author Colin Ward asserts: "Squatting is the oldest mode of tenure in the world, and we are all descended from squatters. This is as true of the Queen [of the United Kingdom] with her 176,000 acres (710 km^{2}) as it is of the 54 percent of householders in Britain who are owner-occupiers. They are all the ultimate recipients of stolen land, for to regard our planet as a commodity offends every conceivable principle of natural rights." The public attitude toward squatting varies, depending on legal aspects, socioeconomic conditions, and the type of housing occupied by squatters. In particular, while squatting of municipal buildings may be treated leniently, squatting of private property can often lead to strongly negative reactions on the part of the general public and the authorities.

== By region ==
=== Africa ===
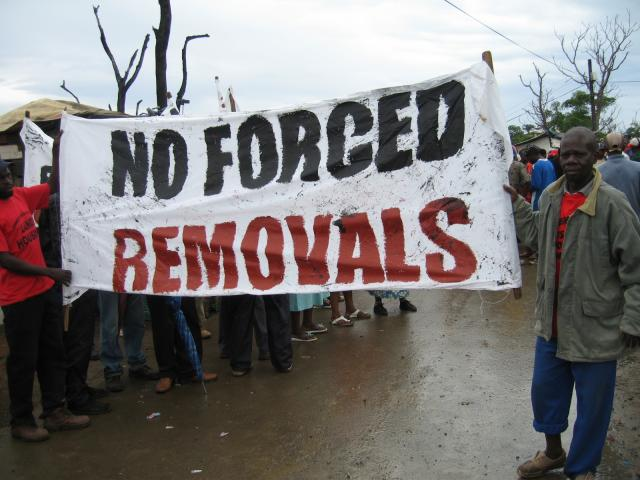
Abahlali baseMjondolo protest in Durban

In African countries such as Nigeria, informal settlements are created by migration from rural areas to urban areas. Reasons for squatting include the lack of low cost housing, unemployment and inability to access loans. In 1995, almost 70% of the population of the Nigerian capital Lagos were living in slums. The City of the Dead slum is a well-known squatter community in Cairo, Egypt. Between 1955 and 1975, the Cairo authorities built 39,000 public housing apartments but 2 million people moved there, mostly ending up in informal housing. In Alexandria, Egypt's second city, public housing was only 0.5% of the total housing stock, whereas informal housing was 68%. An estimated 3,500 people live in the Grande Hotel Beira in Mozambique. Informal settlements in Zambia, particularly around Lusaka, are known as kombonis. As of 2011, 64% of Zambians lived below the poverty line, whilst the United Nations predicted a 941% population increase by 2100.

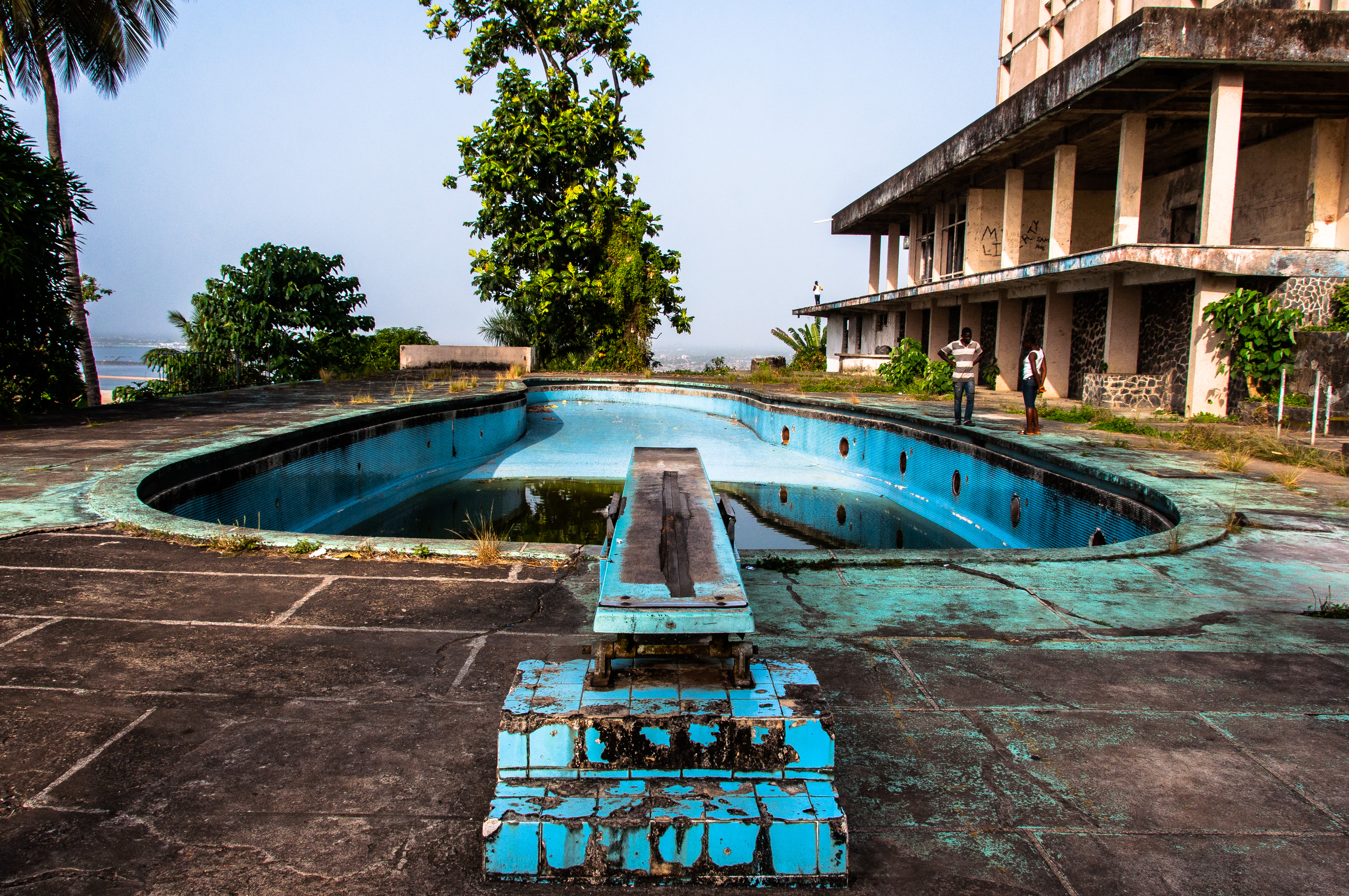
Derelict swimming pool at the Ducor Hotel (Liberia)

In Liberia, squatting is one of three ways to access land, the other being ownership by deed or customary ownership. West Point was founded in Monrovia in the 1950s and is estimated to house between 29,500 and 75,000 people. During the First Liberian Civil War 1989–1997 and the Second Liberian Civil War 1999–2003, many people in Liberia were displaced and some ended up squatting in Monrovia. The Ducor Hotel fell into disrepair and was squatted, before being evicted in 2007. Recently, over 9,000 Burkinabés were squatting on remote land and the Liberia Land Authority (LLA) has announced it will be titling all land in the country.

In South Africa, squatters tend to live in informal settlements or squatter camps on the outskirts of the larger cities, often but not always near townships. In the mid-1990s, an estimated 7.7 million South Africans lived in informal settlements: a fifth of the country's population. The figure was estimated to be 15 million in 2004. In Cape Town and Durban, there have been sustained conflict between the city council and a shack dwellers' movement known as Abahlali baseMjondolo. The organisation has represented the squatters in land occupations such as the Macassar Village in 2009 and the Cape Town and Durban Marikana land occupations in 2013 (both named after the Marikana massacre). It also successfully challenged the KZN Slums Act, which sought to mandate the eviction of slums but was eventually declared unconstitutional.

There have been a number of similar conflicts between shack dwellers, some linked with the Western Cape Anti-Eviction Campaign, and the city council in Cape Town. One of the most high-profile cases was the eviction of squatters in the N2 Gateway homes in the suburb of Delft, where over 20 residents were shot, including a three-year-old child. There have been numerous complaints about the legality of the government's actions. Many of the families then squatted on Symphony Way, a main road in the township of Delft, before being forced to move to a camp called Blikkiesdorp.

Squatting in Sudan is defined as the "acquisition and construction of land, within the city boundaries for the purpose of housing in contradiction to Urban Planning and Land laws and building regulations." These informal settlements arose in Khartoum from the 1920s onwards, swelling in the 1960s. By the 1980s, the government was clearing settlements in Khartoum and regularizing them elsewhere. It was estimated that in 2015 that were 200,000 squatters in Khartoum, 180,000 in Nyala, 60,000 in Kassala, 70,000 in Port Sudan and 170,000 in Wad Madani.

Land squats occurred in what would become Zimbabwe in the 1970s and were routinely evicted. Only Epworth persisted on account of its size (around 50,000 people). After Zimbabwe was created in 1980, peasant farmers and squatters disputed the distribution of land. Informal settlements have developed on the periphery of cities such as Chitungwiza and the capital Harare. In 2005, Operation Murambatsvina ("Operation Drive Out Filth") organised by President Robert Mugabe evicted an estimated 700,000 people and affected over two million people.

=== Middle East ===
Israeli settlements are communities of Israeli citizens living in the Palestinian territories. The international community considers the settlements in occupied territory to be illegal, In March 2018, Israeli settlers were evicted from a house they had illegally occupied in Hebron, a Palestinian city in the West Bank. The fifteen families had argued that they had bought the house, but the High Court of Justice ruled that they had to leave. The Israel Defense Forces declared the building a closed military zone and it was unclear if the Palestinian owners could regain possession. The settlers had already occupied the house and been evicted in 2012. In October 2018, Fatou Bensouda, the Chief Prosecutor of the International Criminal Court stated that Israel's planned demolition of Bedouin village Khan al-Ahmar could constitute a war crime.

Gecekondu is a Turkish word meaning a house put up quickly without proper permissions, a squatter's house, and by extension, a shanty or shack. From the 1960s onwards, these settlements have provided a means of housing for poor workers and new migrants arriving in cities such as Ankara and Istanbul. From the 1980s onwards, property developers have upgraded many gecekondu areas. Shortly after the 2013 Gezi Park protests in Istanbul, Don Kişot (Don Quixote) was squatted in the Kadıköy district. It was stated to be the city's first occupied and self-managed social centre; Caferağa Mahalle Evi (community centre Caferağa), also in Kadıköy, was squatted soon afterwards and evicted in December 2014. A place was occupied in Beşiktaş district of Istanbul on 18 March 2014, and named Berkin Elvan Student House, after a 15-year-old boy who was shot during the Gezi protests and later died. Atopya was squatted in Ankara in June 2014 by anarchists, who claimed it was the city's first political squat.

=== South and East Asia ===
Squatters in Malaysia live on both privately owned and government-owned land. Some squatters have lived on land owned by national electricity company Tenaga Nasional for over five decades. Squatters in Indonesia live on both privately owned and government-owned land. For example, the former Kalisosok Prison in Surabaya has been squatted since 2000s after being used as a prison for over 100 years. In Thailand, although evictions have reduced their visibility or numbers in urban areas, many squatters still occupy land near railroad tracks, under overpasses, and waterways. Commercial squatting is common in Thailand, where businesses temporarily seize nearby public real estate (such as sidewalks, roadsides, beaches, etc.) and roll out their enterprise, and at closing time they fold it in and lock it up, thus avoiding the extra cost of having to rent more property. In the early 2000s, the government estimated that 37% of the population lived in low-income urban communities, over half of which were squatting public land or renting precariously. The National Housing Authority stated over 100,000 families were living under threat of immediate eviction.

In China, informal settlements are known as urban villages. Squatter settlements occurred in Hong Kong in 1946, after its wartime occupation by Japan. After 700,000 people migrated from mainland China to Hong Kong between 1949 and 1950; the squatter population was estimated at 300,000, with people sleeping wherever they could find a space. A fire at Shek Kip Mei in December 1953 resulted in over 50,000 slum-dwellers being left homeless. Rooftop slums then developed, when people began to live illegally on the roofs of urban buildings. In addition, the Kowloon Walled City became an area for squatters, housing up to 50,000 people in Hong Kong.

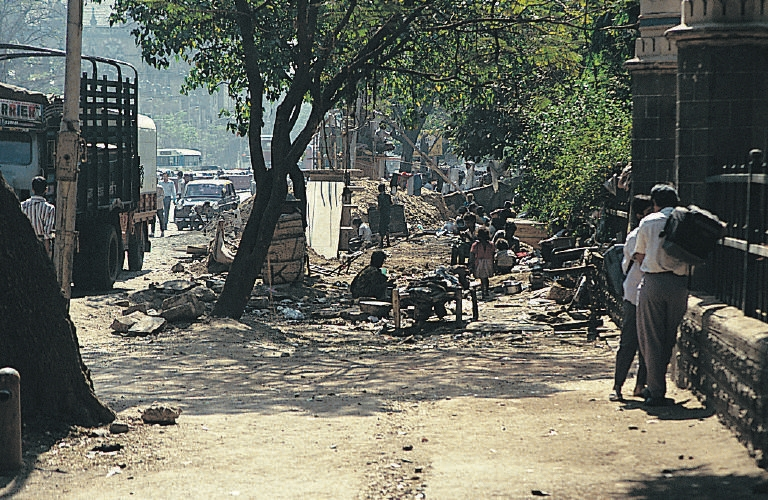
Street dwellers in Mumbai

In Mumbai, India, there are an estimated 10 to 12 million inhabitants, and six million of them are squatters. The squatters live in a variety of ways. Some possess two- or three-story homes built out of brick and concrete which they have inhabited for years. Geeta Nagar is a squatter village based beside the Indian Navy compound at Colaba. Squatter Colony in Malad East has existed since 1962, and now, people living there pay a rent to the city council of 100 rupees a month. Dharavi is a community of one million squatters. The stores and factories situated there are mainly illegal and so are unregulated, but it is suggested that they do over $1 million in business every day. Other squatters are pavement dwellers, with very few possessions. Activists such as Jockin Arputham, Prema Gopalan and Sheela Patel are working for better living conditions for slum dwellers, through organisations such as Mahila Milan and Slum Dwellers International. In the 2016 Mathura clash, members of Azad Bharat Vidhik Vaicharik Kranti Satyagrahi (Free India Legal Ideas Revolutionary Protesters) who had been living in Mathura's largest public park Jawahar Bagh for two years were evicted in a large police operation. At least 24 squatters were killed.

After World War II many people were left homeless in the Philippines and they built makeshift houses called "barong-barong" on abandoned private land. The first mass eviction on record in Manila was 1951 and the largest was in late 1963 and early 1964 when 90,000 people were displaced. By 1978, there were estimated to be two million squatters in Manila, occupying 415 different locations. The number of squatters grew during the early 1980s, and attempts to relocate squatters to low-cost housing projects were made by the national government. The sites were not received well, as it moved people far away from their employment and social networks. Projects included the redevelopment of the former Smokey Mountain landfill in Tondo, the BLISS housing project in Taguig, and the establishment of Barangay Bagong Silang as a resettlement area for slum dwellers residing in Manila. In 1982, Imelda Marcos referred to the latter group as "professional squatters [...] plain land-grabbers taking advantage of the compassionate society". Philippines-based media and journalists refer to squatters as "informal settlers". The Community Mortgage Program was set up in 1992, aiming to help low-income families transition from squatting to affordable housing. By 2001, around 106,000 families had found secure housing in over 800 separate communities.

=== Central and Eastern Europe ===
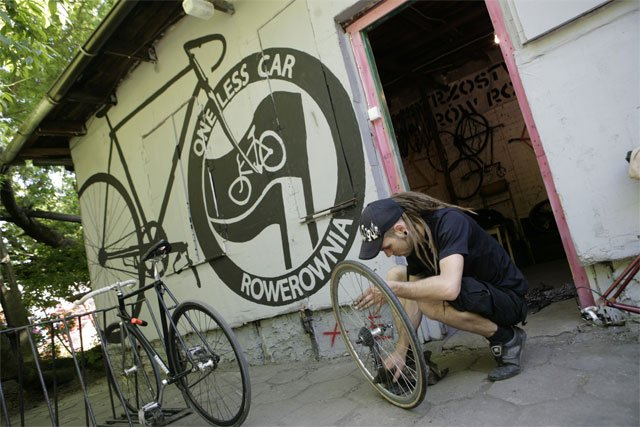
Rozbrat squat in Poznań.

The trajectory of squatting in central and eastern Europe is different from that of western Europe because, until recently, countries were part of the Communist Bloc and squatting is generally not tolerated.

- The first public squat in Romania was Carol 53 in Bucharest, occupied in 2012 by artists. This was a controversial project because in running the project, the artists evicted a Roma family which was already silently squatting there.
- In Moldova, homeless people live in state-run shelters or squatter camps. Squatters in Centro 73, Moldova's first squatted, self-managed social centre, attempted to prevent the historical building's demolition, but were quickly evicted and given another building for art events.
- The oldest squat in Poland, Rozbrat, was founded in 1994 through the occupation of a former paint factory in Poznań. There are also squats in Białystok, Gdańsk, Gliwice, Warsaw and Wrocław.
- In Slovenia, the capital Ljubljana has an occupied former military barracks called Metelkova and the recently evicted former bicycle factory called Rog.
- Croatia has social centres such as the former Karlo Rojc barracks in Pula and (AKC) Medika in Zagreb.
- In Serbia, shacks to be built as second homes or Roma people occupy buildings. A large Roma informal settlement called Cardboard city was evicted in 2009.

In 1980s Soviet Russia, there was a practice used by artists and musicians to acquire communal rooms and then expand into other rooms. Following the dissolution of the Soviet Union, there were many collectively organised housing occupations by families and refugees. The groups would attempt to legalise in some cases and not in others. There were also art squats, for example, in Saint Petersburg, there were Pushkinskaya 10, Na Fontanke and Synovia doktora Pelia. In the early 1990s, the Government of Moscow prepared to renovate buildings, but then ran out of money, meaning that squatters occupied prime real estate. By 1996, 40 percent of Tverskaya Street was rented illegally or squatted.

Squatting in the Czech Republic began in its modern form when anarchist and punk activists inspired by squatting movements in Amsterdam and Berlin occupied derelict houses following the 1989 Velvet Revolution. Ladronka (1993–2000) became internationally famous as a hub for counter-cultural activities and anarchist organisation. Squat Milada was occupied in 1997 and evicted in 2009. Its longevity was in part due to the building not existing in the cadastre. Klinika was an occupied social centre between 2014 and 2019. These three social centres, all in Prague, were the city's three most important political squats.

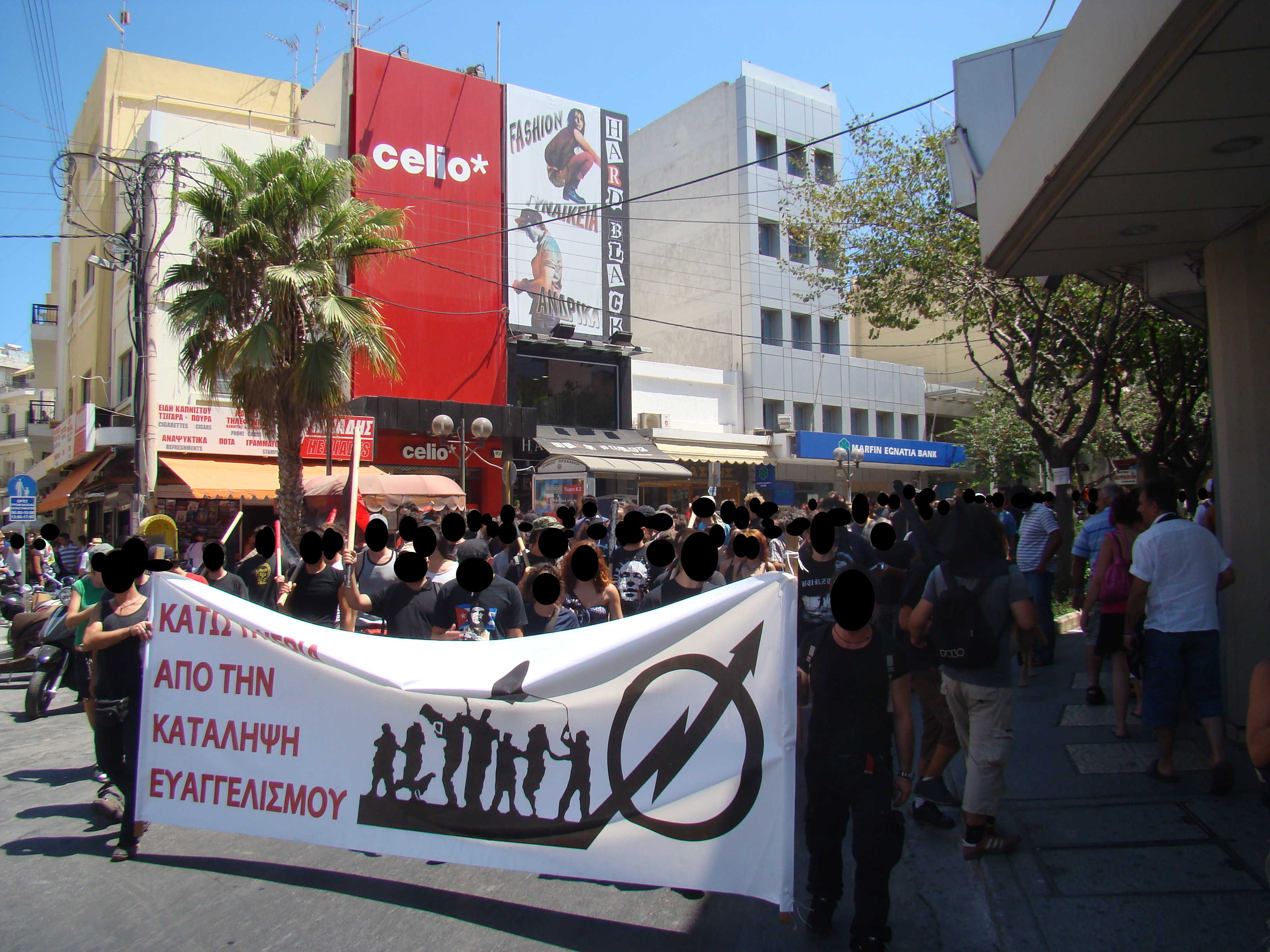
A pro-squatting protest in Greece, with participants carrying anarchist flags

Starting from December 2012, Greek Police initiated extensive raids in a number of squats in Athens, arresting and charging with offences all illegal occupants (mostly anarchists). Squats including Villa Amalia were evicted. A march in support of the 92 arrestees drew between 3,000 and 8,000 people. After Villa Amalia, Villa Skaramanga and then Villa Lela Karagianni were evicted. Lela Karagianni had been squatted since 1998 and was later reoccupied. The name came from the street, named for a Greek World War II resistance leader of that name. From 2015 onwards Athens has seen refugee squats in response to the European migrant crisis which are anarchist and self-organised. In 2019, several squats in Exarcheia were evicted by the Greek state. Some of the migrants evicted set up a camp outside the Parliament at Syntagma Square.

There was a large squatting movement in the newly formed state of Austria following the First World War. Famine was a significant problem for many people in Austria and the "Siedler" (settler) movement developed as these people tried to create shelter and a source of food for themselves. The Ernst Kirchweger Haus (EKH) in Vienna was squatted as a social centre in 1990 and legalised in 2008. In 2014, 1,500 riot police officers, a tank-like police vehicle, a police water cannon and helicopters were used to clear a building occupied by the group Pizzeria Anarchia in Vienna.

=== Western Europe ===
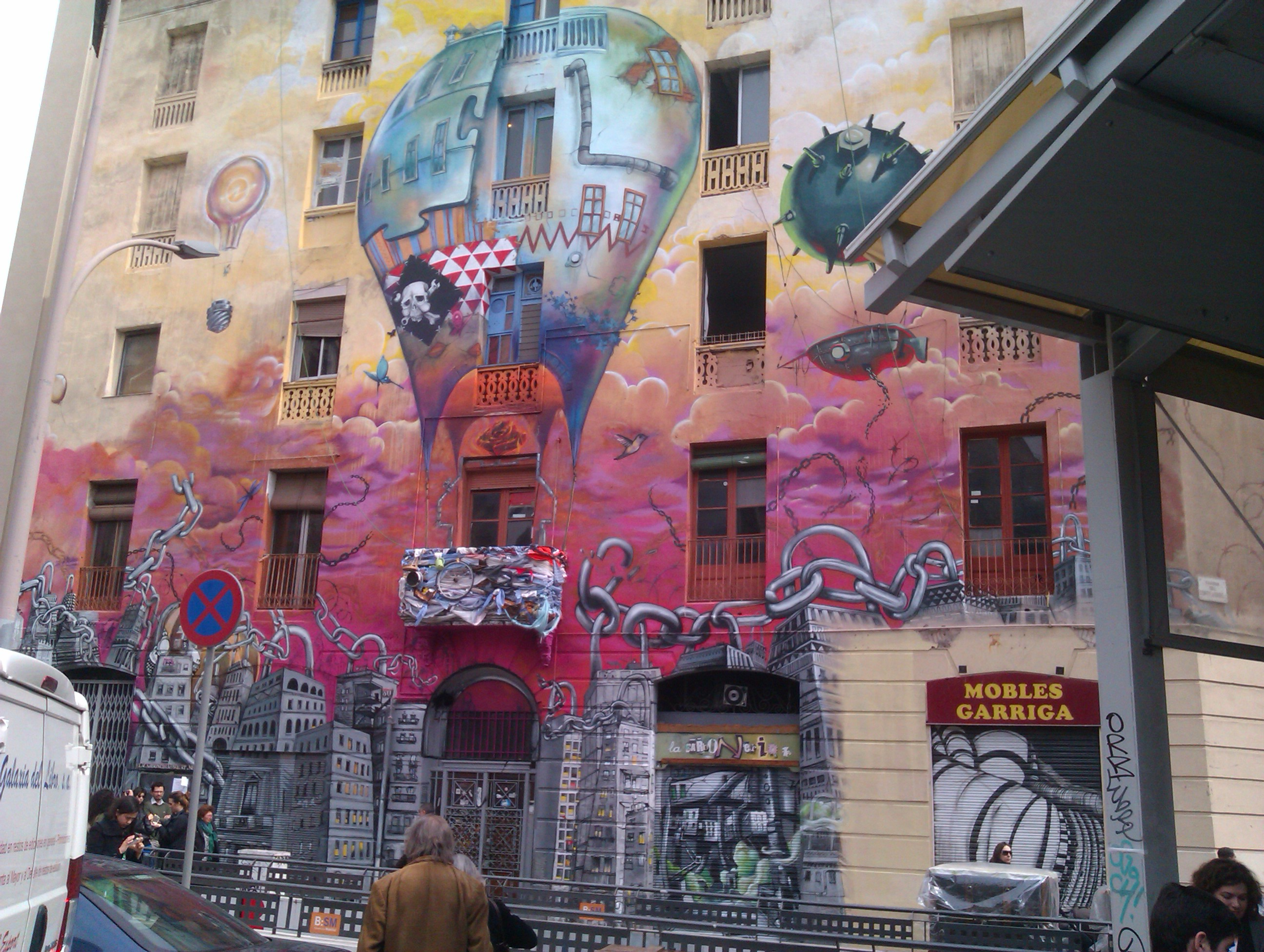
Facade of the evicted Carboneria squat in Barcelona

In many West European countries, since the 1960s and 1970s, there are both squatted houses used as residences and self-managed social centres where people pursue social and cultural activities. In Belgium, the village of Doel was slowly occupied by squatters and used by street artists after becoming a ghost village when the plans to expand Port of Antwerp stalled. Christiania in Copenhagen, Denmark, is an independent community of almost 900 people founded in 1971 on the site of an abandoned military zone. In Copenhagen, as in other European cities such as Berlin and Amsterdam, the squatter movement was large in the 1980s. It was a social movement, providing housing and alternative culture. A flashpoint came in 1986 with the Battle of Ryesgade. Another flashpoint came in 2007 when Ungdomshuset was evicted. While not technically a squat until 14 December 2006, it was a social centre used by squatters and people involved in alternative culture more generally. After a year of protests, the city council donated a new building. The Dublin Housing Action Committee (DHAC) was active between 1968 and 1971, occupying buildings to protest the housing crisis in Ireland. The Prohibition of Forcible Entry and Occupation Act of 1971 criminalized squatting. Squatters can gain title to land and property by adverse possession as governed by the 1957 Statute of Limitations Act. From the 1990s onwards, there have been occasional political squats such as Disco Disco, Magpie and Grangegorman.

In nineteenth century France, squatting was encouraged as a political practice by anarchist groups, such as the Ligue des Anti-propriétaires and the illegalist Pieds plats, of the concept of déménagement à la cloche de bois ('silent move-outs'), the act of leaving a residence without notifying the landlord and ceasing to pay rent. The following century, several artists who would later become world-famous, such as Guillaume Apollinaire, Amedeo Modigliani and Pablo Picasso squatted at the Bateau-Lavoir, in Montmartre, Paris. Paris moved to legitimize some popular artist squats in the mid-2000s by purchasing and renovating the buildings for artist–residents. An example is Les Frigos. In the 2010s there have been several land squats protesting against large infrastructure projects. These are known collectively as Zone to Defend or ZAD (French: zone à défendre). The first and largest was the ZAD de Notre-Dame-des-Landes, which successfully opposed an airport project near Nantes.

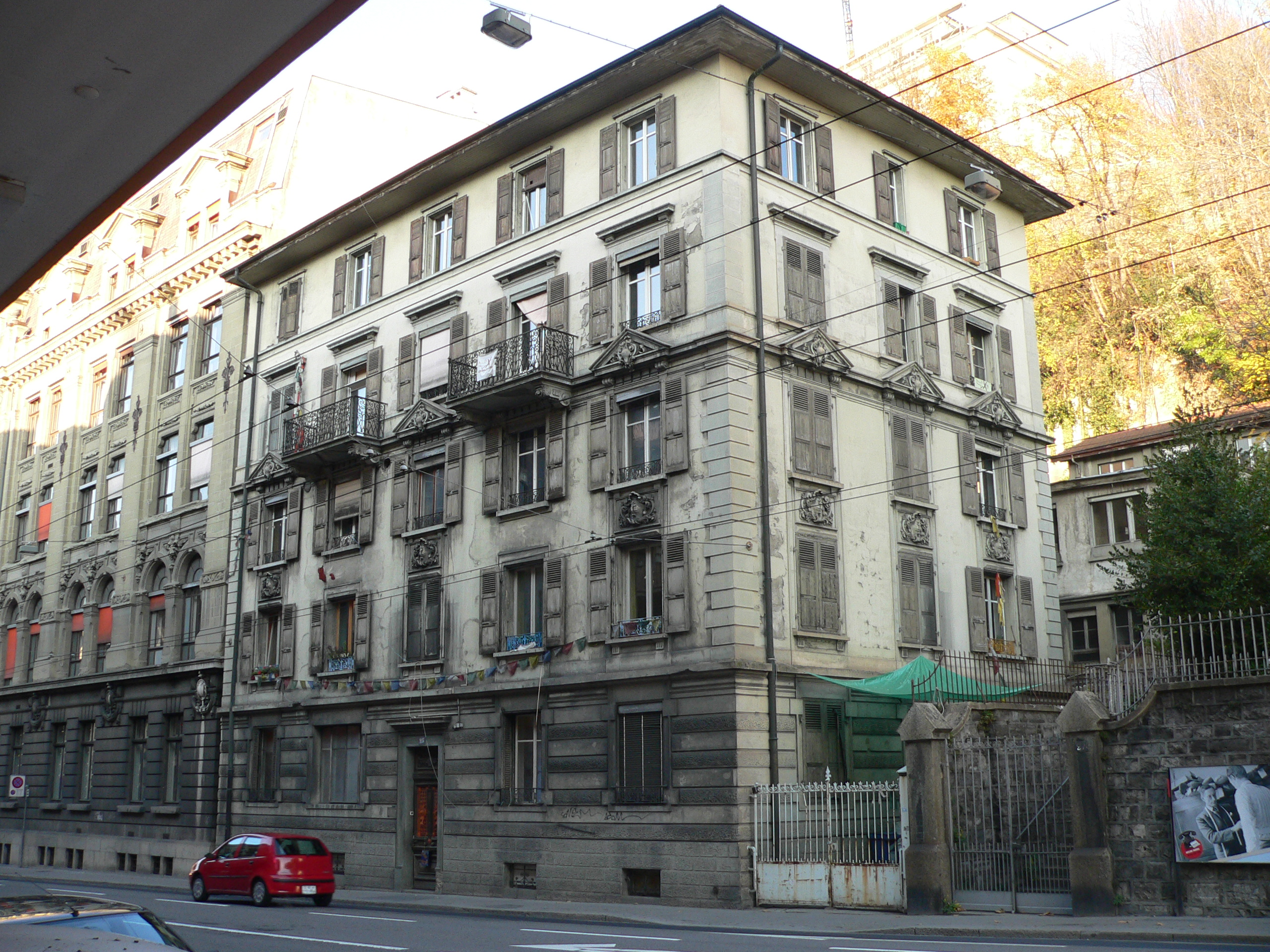
The Chien Rouge (Red Dog) in Lausanne, in a former hospital

Geneva in Switzerland had 160 buildings illegally occupied and more than 2,000 squatters, in the middle of the 1990s. The RHINO (Retour des Habitants dans les Immeubles Non-Occupés, in English: Return of Inhabitants to Non-Occupied Buildings) was a 19-year-long squat in Geneva. It occupied two buildings on the Boulevard des Philosophes, a few blocks away from the main campus of the University of Geneva. The RHINO organisation often faced legal troubles, and Geneva police evicted the inhabitants on 23 July 2007. There were large riots in Zürich when the Binz occupation was evicted in 2013. The squatters moved to another building.

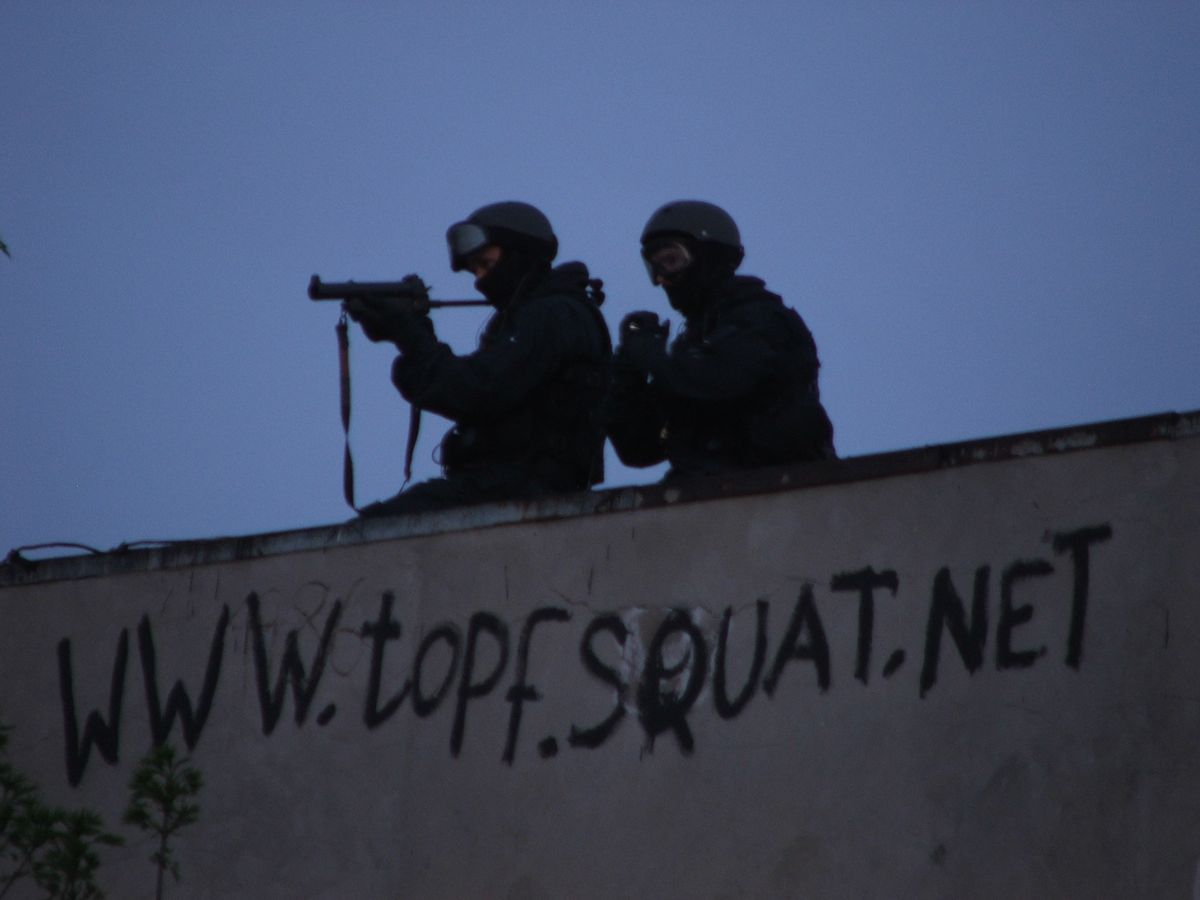
Police during eviction of the Topf & Söhne squat, 16 April 2009

During the public opposition in the 1970s, squatting in West German cities led to what Margit Mayer termed "a self-confident urban counterculture with its own infrastructure of newspapers, self-managed collectives and housing cooperatives, feminist groups, and so on, which was prepared to intervene in local and broader politics". The Autonomen movement protected squats against eviction and participated in radical direct action in cities such as Berlin. The squats were mainly for residential and social use. Squatting became known by the term instandbesetzen, from instandsetzen ("renovating") and besetzen ("occupying"). Well-known contemporary squats include Køpi in Berlin and Rote Flora in Hamburg. Legalised housing projects include Hafenstraße in Hamburg and Kiefernstraße in Düsseldorf. The Mietshäuser Syndikat was founded in 1992 by people who had been squatting in Freiburg im Breisgau in the 1980s to provide a way of transforming private property into collective ownership, including squats. Squatting has also been used as a tactic for campaigning purposes, such as the Anatopia project, which protested against a Mercedes-Benz test track. Squatters moved into the former factory site of J.A. Topf & Söhne in Erfurt in April 2001 and remained there until they were evicted by police in April 2009. The firm made crematoria for Nazi concentration camps. The squatters ran culture programs which drew attention to the history of the company. The occupation was known simply as Das Besetzte Haus (the occupied house) and was one of the most well known actions of left-radicals of that period in Germany. A book about the occupation was published in 2012, entitled Topf & Söhne – Besetzung auf einem Täterort (Topf & Söhne – Occupation of a crime scene). Since 2012, Hambach Forest has been occupied by activists seeking to prevent its destruction by the energy company RWE. While the majority of squatting in Germany still comes from left-wing actors there are also examples of right-wing squatting. An example for right-wing squatting in Berlin is the occupation of Weitlingstraße 122. The house was occupied by neo-Nazis in 1990, when a lot of houses in former GDR where empty. They named similar social issues as leftist squatters as their reason for squatting. The space was used for different purposes ranging from a place to live, gather or party, to producing propaganda and planning right-wing terrorist activities. The squat dissolved at the end of 1990 because of disagreements in the heterogenous group of squatters.

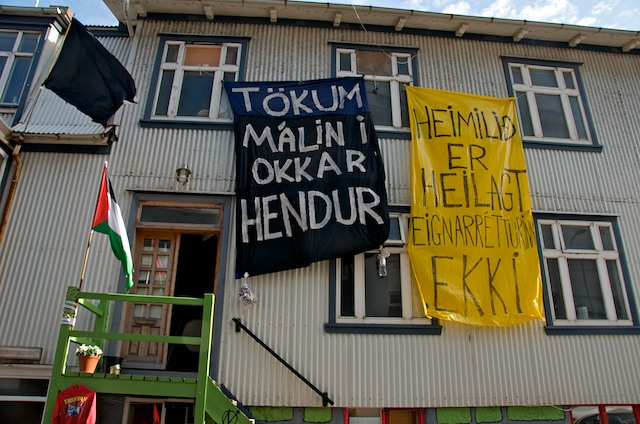
A short-lived squat in Reykjavík in 2009. The signs say "We take matters into our own hands" and "The home is sacred, the property rights are not"

In Reykjavík, the capital of Iceland, there is a small tradition of squatting. In 1919, anarchists occupied a building and were quickly evicted. Squatters occupied an empty house in downtown Reykjavík on Vatnsstigur street in April 2009. The squatters set up a freeshop and had plans for a social centre, but the occupation was quickly evicted by the police and 22 people were arrested. Vatnsstigur 4 was briefly resquatted on 7 May 2009, in solidarity with the Rozbrat squat in Poland, which was threatened with eviction. Also in 2009, a group of graffiti artists called the Pretty Boys occupied Hverfisgata 34. Their intention was to make a clandestine gallery and then when they were not evicted, they legalised the space and called it Gallery Bosnia. When the Reykjavíkur Akademían (the Reykjavík Academy) was evicted at short notice from Hringbraut 121 in November 2011, it was occupied in protest. The space, which had hosted lectures and also Iceland's trade union and anarchist libraries, was moved to another location but the occupiers were unhappy that the new use of the building would be a guest house for tourists. An art exhibition was organised, with a camera obscura, live music and shadow theatre.

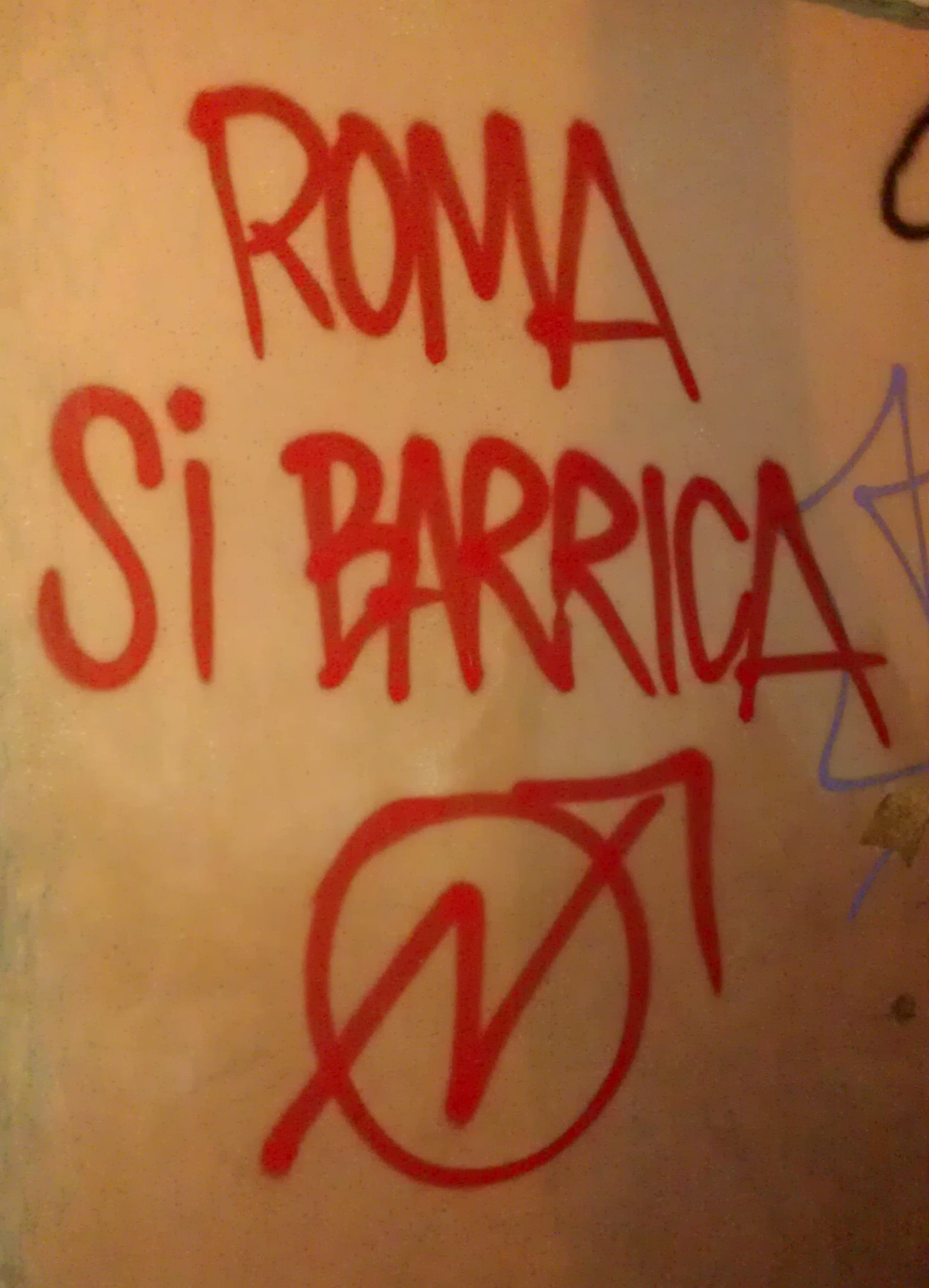
Rome barricades itself. A squatting symbol appearing as graffiti in Rome

In Italy, despite the lack of official data, it appears that about 50,000 buildings all over the country are unused or abandoned and thus subject to squatting. Squatting has no legal basis, but many squats are used as social centres. The first occupations of abandoned buildings began in 1968 with the left-wing movements Lotta Continua and Potere Operaio. Out of the breakup of these two movements was born Autonomia Operaia, which was composed of a Marxist–Leninist and Maoist wing and also an anarchist and more libertarian one. These squats had Marxist–Leninist (but also Stalinist and Maoist) ideals and came from the left wing of Autonomia. The militants of the Italian armed struggle (the New Red Brigades) were connected to these squats. There are many left-wing self-organised occupied projects across Italy such as Cascina Torchiera and Centro Sociale Leoncavallo in Milan and Forte Prenestino in Rome. In Rome there is also a far-right social centre, Casa Pound. This situation has so far received the approval of Italian courts, which have been reluctant to defend the owners' rights. In contrast with the dominant jurisprudence, new case-law (from the Rome Tribunal and the Supreme Court of Cassation) instructs the government to pay damages in case of squatting if the institutions have failed to prevent it.

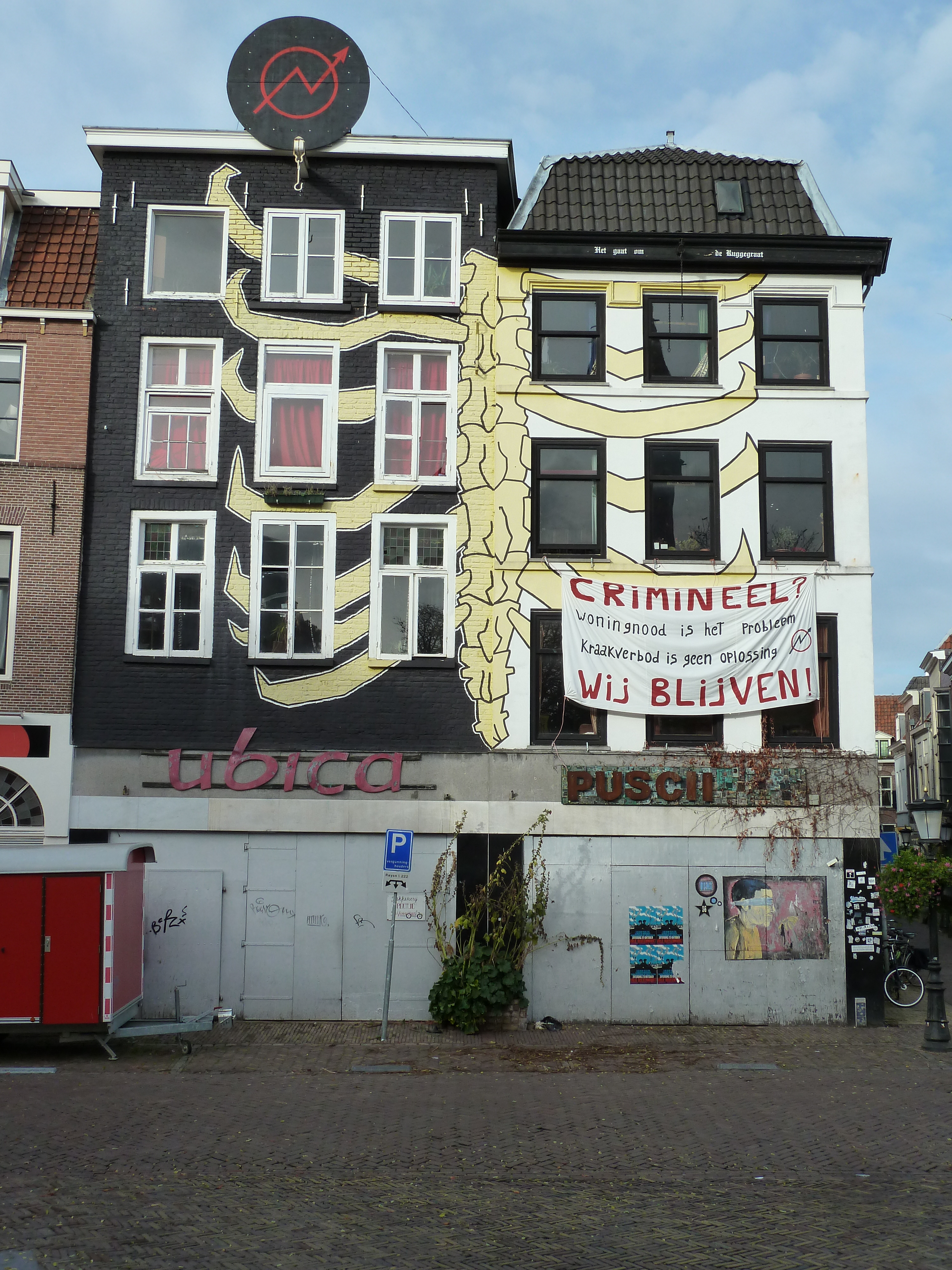
Ubica, a former squat in Utrecht

Regarding squatting in the Netherlands, the Dutch use the term krakers to refer to people who squat houses with the aim of living in them (as opposed to people who break into buildings for the purpose of vandalism or theft). Notable squats in cities around the country include ACU and Moira in Utrecht, the Poortgebouw in Rotterdam, OCCII, OT301 and Vrankrijk in Amsterdam, the Grote Broek in Nijmegen, Vrijplaats Koppenhinksteeg in Leiden, De Vloek in The Hague and the Landbouwbelang in Maastricht. Land squats include Ruigoord and Fort Pannerden. On 1 June 2010, squatting in the Netherland became illegal and punishable when a decree was sent out that the squatting ban would be enforced from 1 October. Following legal challenges, on 28 October 2011, the Supreme Court of the Netherlands decided that the eviction of a squat can only occur after an intervention of a judge. The Dutch government assessed the effectiveness of the new law in 2015, releasing a report giving statistics on arrests and convictions between October 2010 and December 2014. During this time period, 529 people have been arrested for the act of occupying derelict buildings in 213 separate incidents. Of the 529 arrests, 210 were found guilty. Of those convicted, 39 people were imprisoned for the new offence.

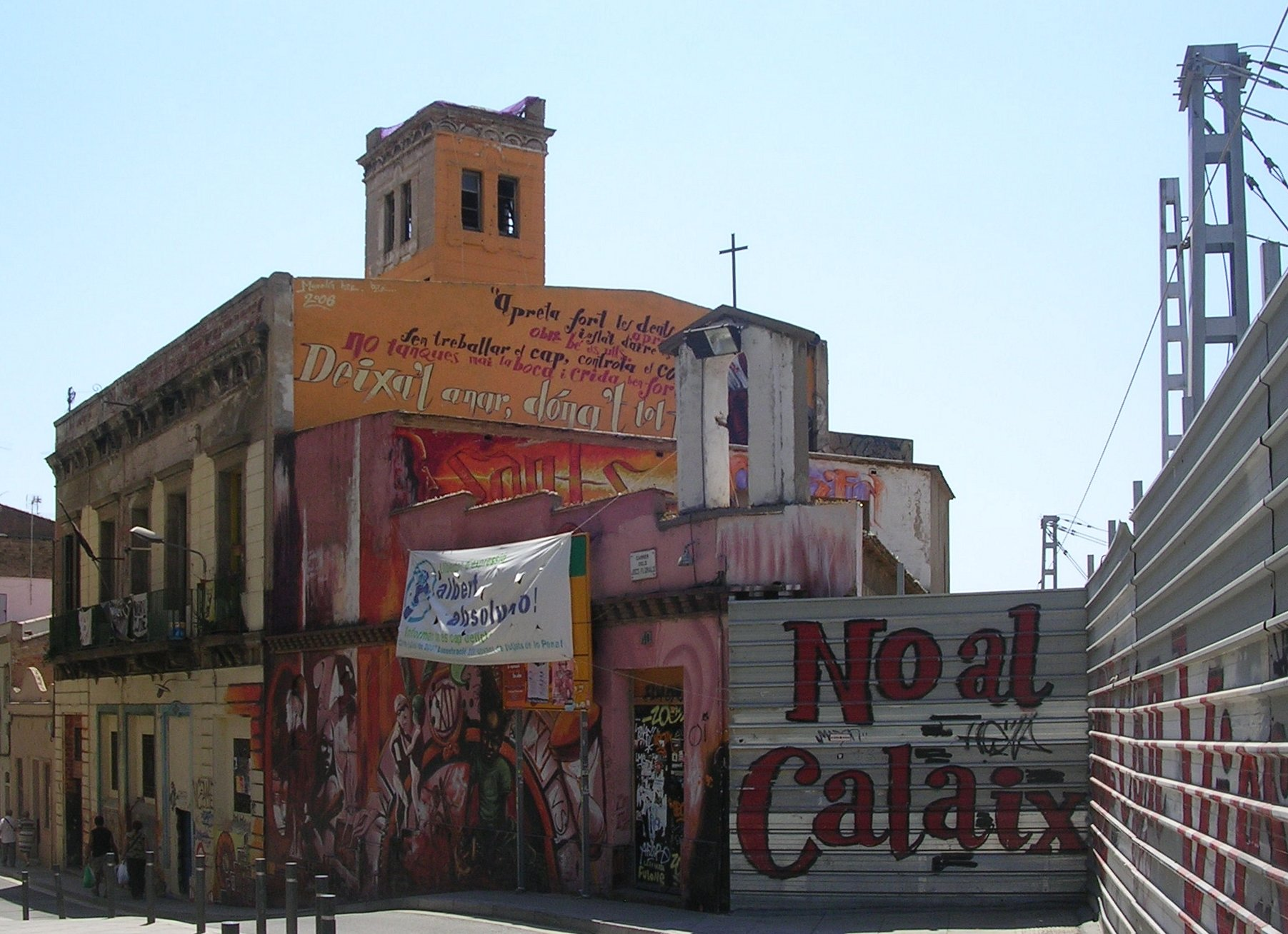
The Can Vies social centre in Barcelona

In Francoist Spain migrant workers lived in slums on the periphery of cities. After the Spanish transition to democracy, residential squatting occurred in Spanish cities such as Barcelona, Bilbao, Madrid, Valencia and Zaragoza. The number of squatted social centres in Barcelona grew from under thirty in the 1990s to around sixty in 2014, as recorded by Info Usurpa (a weekly activist agenda). The influential Kasa de la Muntanya was occupied in 1989. In 2014, the ultimately unsuccessful attempts to evict the long-running social centre of Can Vies provoked major riots. Another long-running squat is Can Masdeu, which survived a concerted eviction attempt in 2002, when eleven occupiers suspended themselves off the walls of the building for several days. Other social centres include Can Vies in Barcelona and Eskalera Karakola and La Ingobernable in Madrid. In the Basque Country the centres are known as gaztetxes. A well-known example was Kukutza in Bilbao.

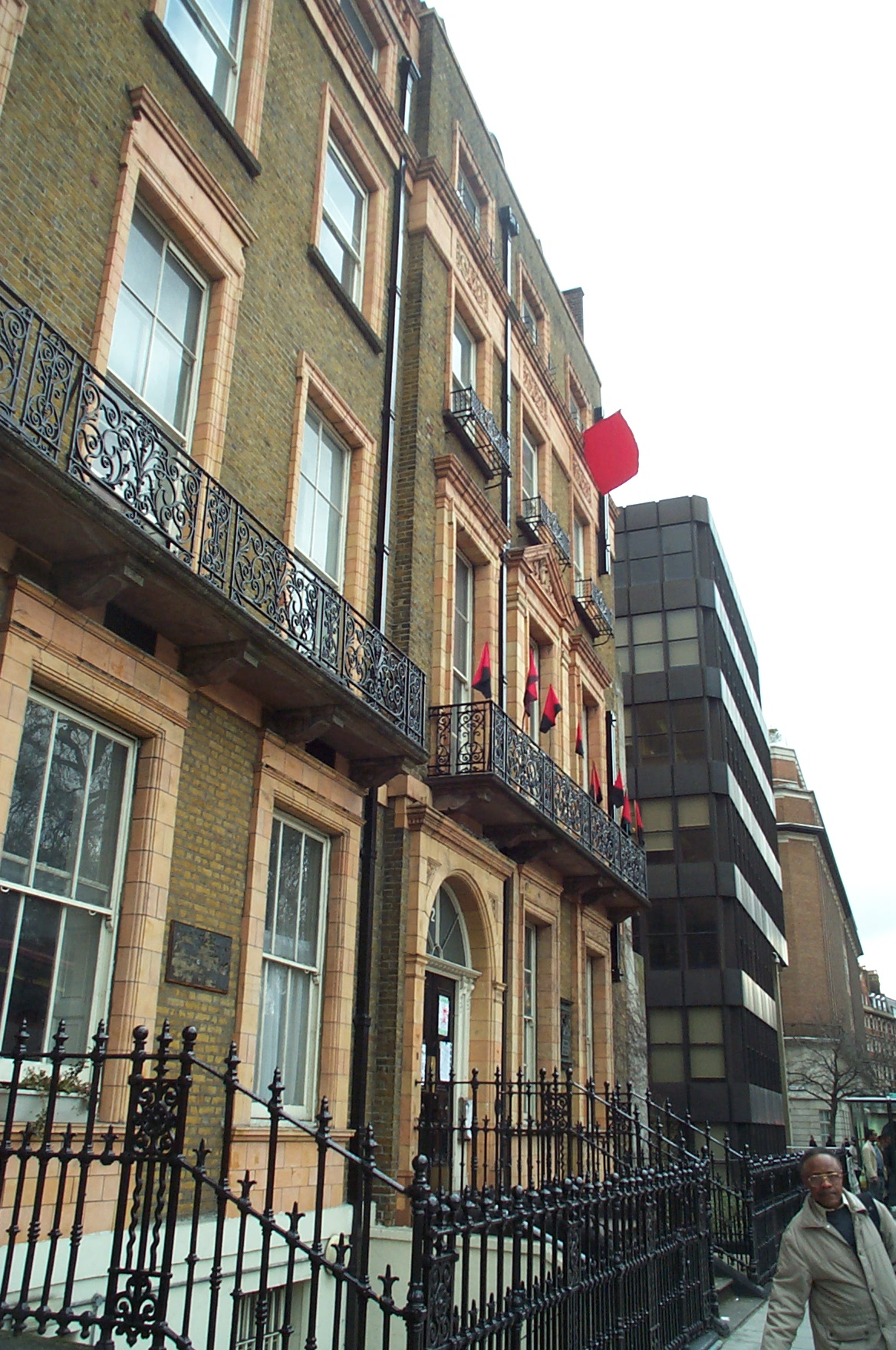
The "Square Occupied Social Centre", a now-evicted squat in Russell Square, London

Squatting in England and Wales has a long history. The occupation and cultivation of untended land motivated the Peasants' Revolt of 1381 and the Diggers in the 17th century. In the 20th century, squatters turned to abandoned buildings. Mass squats were organised in a number of prominent public buildings in central London, culminating in the occupation of 144 Piccadilly in 1969. The London Street Commune or "Hippydilly" garnered worldwide attention. There were estimated to be 50,000 squatters throughout Britain in the late 1970s, with the majority (30,000) living in London. The BBC reported in 2011 that the government estimated that there were "20,000 squatters in the UK" and "650,000 empty properties". On 1 September 2012, under Section 144 of the Legal Aid, Sentencing and Punishment of Offenders Act 2012, squatting in residential property was criminalised by the Cameron–Clegg coalition, punishable by up to six months in prison or a £5000 fine, or both. The same year saw the first successful prosecution for squatting, resulting in a 12-week jail sentence. Section 61 of the Criminal Justice and Public Order Act 1994 provides police with additional power to remove trespassers when there is damage to land or property, trespassers are abusive, insulting or threatening or there are over six vehicles on premises related to squatters. In the late 1960s, people in Northern Ireland were forced to squat through both poverty and a lack of decent housing. In County Tyrone, there were allegations of unfair housing provision on the basis of politics and religion. When a house in the village of Caledon, near Dungannon, was allocated to a young Protestant woman, Emily Beattie, it caused protests. She was secretary to a solicitor who worked for the Unionist councillor who had given her the house and two Catholic families who had been overlooked complained that the same councillor had scotched plans to build houses for Catholics in the Dungannon area. Several days after the woman had moved in, the Catholic squatters in the house next door were evicted. Austin Currie, then a young politician, complained both at the local council and at Stormont about the situation. He then symbolically occupied the woman's house for a few hours, before being evicted by the Royal Ulster Constabulary (RUC). One of the police officers was the woman's brother who himself moved into the house later on. The incident quickly became a media sensation and in August the civil rights movement arranged one of its first marches, from Coalisland to Dungannon. This was followed in October by a civil rights march in Derry which was organised by the Derry Housing Action Committee and the Northern Ireland Civil Rights Association. The march was repressed by the RUC. In 2012, activists from Occupy Belfast squatted in a Bank of Ireland building in Belfast city centre and used it as a social space. Squatting in Northern Ireland was unaffected by the recent law change in England and Wales, and remains a civil matter.

Squatting in Scotland is a criminal offence, punishable by a fine or imprisonment, under the Trespass (Scotland) Act 1865. The owner or lawful occupier of the property has the right to evict squatters without notice or apply to the court for an eviction order, although when evicting, they cannot do anything that would break the law, for example, use violence. Nevertheless, the 19th and early 20th centuries saw various land raids in which cottars attempted to occupy land for subsistence farming. In 1948, the Seven Men of Knoydart unsuccessfully squatted on land owned by the Nazi-supporting Lord Brocket. There have been several road protest land squats such as Bilston Glen and Pollok Free State. The former premises of the Forest Café in Edinburgh were squatted in 2011 and activists occupied a former shelter in Glasgow in 2021, during COP26.

In 2010, a representative of the UK Bailiff Company claimed that the number of people squatting in Wales was at its highest for 40 years. The high number of businesses failing in urban Wales has led to squatting becoming a growing issue in large cities like Swansea and Cardiff. Experts said "the majority [of squatters] are forced into the lifestyle by financial pressures." Based on the internal database of UK Bailiff Company, there were 100 cases of squatting in 2009, the highest for 40 years, following trends estimated by the Advisory Service for Squatters that squatting has doubled in England and Wales since 1995. As with England, from 1 September 2012, squatting in a residential building was made a criminal offence subject to arrest, fine and imprisonment. Cardiff Squatters Network was formed in December 2012, to network together squatters citywide, and host "skill-share" workshops on squatting legally in commercial buildings.

=== North America ===
In Canada, there are two systems to register the ownership of land. Under the land title system, squatter rights, formally known as adverse possession, were abolished. However, under the registry system, these rights have been preserved. If a person occupies land for the required period of time as set out in provincial limitation acts and during that time no legal action is taken to evict them, then the ownership of the land transfers from the legal owner to the squatter. Road allowance communities were settlements established by Métis people in the late 1800s through most of the 20th century on road allowances at the margins of settler society. Métis people were dispossessed from their land in the late 19th century, so they frequently squatted in these unclaimed and marginal spaces. The Frances Street Squats in Vancouver were a row of six buildings squatted for nine months in 1990. They were evicted in a large operation and a film was subsequently made, called The Beat of Frances Street. In recent years, there have been a number of public squats which have brought together the two main contemporary reasons for squatting – homelessness and activism. Examples are the Préfontaine squat in Overdale, a district of Montreal (2001), the Woodward's Squat in Vancouver (2002), the Infirmary Squat in Halifax (2002), the Pope Squat in Toronto (2002), the Seven Year Squat in Ottawa (2002), the Water Street Squat in Peterborough (2003), and the North Star hotel in Vancouver (2006). These were squats organised by anti-poverty groups which tended to be short-lived. The Woodward's building was a derelict department store which had stood empty for nine years. After being evicted from the building, two hundred squatters set up a tent city on the pavement outside. The action is credited with putting in motion the eventual redevelopment of the building. The Peterborough Coalition Against Poverty (PCAP) publicly squatted 1130 Water Street, a building which stood empty after a fire. The group offered to repair the place and return it to its use as low-income housing. City officials agreed to the repairs and then City Council voted to demolish the building. The cost of demolition was $8,900 and the cost of repairs had been projected to be $6,900. The North Star hotel was temporarily squatted as a protest against emptiness by the Vancouver Anti-Poverty Committee. In 2011, the "Occupy Toronto squat team" squatted a basement at 238 Queen Street West and offered to take on a lease for 99 cents per year. They were evicted after eight hours.

Squatting in the United States occurred historically in large numbers during both the California Gold Rush and World War II. Hoovervilles were homeless camps built across the country during the Great Depression in the 1930s. They were named after Herbert Hoover, who was president of the country at the time. During the hippie movement, squatters in New Mexico established the commune of Tawapa near the Sandia Mountains. However, they were kicked out in the 1990s because they did not have the legal rights to the land. During the Great Recession (2007–2009) more shanty towns appeared with others squatting in foreclosed homes.

Community organizations have abetted squatters in taking over vacant buildings not only as a place to live but also a part of larger campaign to shine a light on inequity in housing and advocate change in housing and land issues. In 2002, the New York City administration agreed to work with eleven squatted buildings on the Lower East Side in a deal brokered by the Urban Homesteading Assistance Board with the condition the apartments would eventually be turned over to the tenants as low-income housing cooperatives.

=== Latin America and the Caribbean ===
In Latin American and Caribbean countries, informal settlements result from internal migration to urban areas, lack of affordable housing and ineffective governance. During the 1950s and 1960s, many Latin American cities demolished squatter settlements and would quickly evict land invasions. In Chile, the government of Eduardo Frei Montalva (1964–1970) began to permit shanty towns and the government of Salvador Allende (1970–1973) encouraged them, but under the military junta from 1973 onwards squatters were again quickly evicted. Likewise in Argentina, under the military dictatorship there was a zero tolerance policy. Nevertheless, forced by hunger and unemployment to take action, 20,000 squatters occupied 211 hectares of disused privately owned land on the periphery of Buenos Aires in 1981, forming six new settlements. They collectively resisted the eviction attempts and by 1984 had outlasted the dictatorship. The election of a democratic government led to the local councils becoming more open to negotiation.

More recently, governments have switched from a policy of eradication to one of giving squatters title to their lands, as part of various programs to move people out of slums and to alleviate poverty. Inspired by the World Bank and the thinking of economists such as Hernando de Soto, the programs aim to provide better housing and to promote entrepreneurship, for the former squatters can use their houses as collateral to secure business loans. Former squatters found that it was hard to maintain the property title over time after deaths or divorces and that banks changed their loan requirements so as to exclude them. In Nicaragua, squatting occurred after the 1972 Nicaragua earthquake. In Peru, the name given to the squatter zones is pueblos jóvenes (literally "young towns"). In the 1980s, there were more than 300 pueblos jóvenes surrounding the capital Lima, housing over one million people. In Argentina they are known as villa miseria (literally "misery settlement"), and as asentamiento in Uruguay and Guatemala.

The population of Ecuador's capital Quito grew sevenfold between 1950 and 2001. There are three types of slums in the city, namely barrios periféricos (shanty towns on the edge of the city), conventillos (dilapidated tenements in the urban centre) and rural shanty towns from where inhabitants commute to work in the city. An estimated 170,000 people were living in slums in 1992. In Guayaquil, Ecuador's largest city and main port, around 600,000 people in the early 1980s were either squatting on self-built structures over swamplands or living in inner-city slums. Illegal settlements frequently resulted from land invasions, in which large groups of squatters would build structures and hope to prevent eviction through strength in numbers.

From the beginning of the 19th century, there was internal migration from rural areas to cities such as Cochabamba in Bolivia. By 1951, the migrants had begun to seize land and build informal settlements. The land invasions continued despite the authorities often evicting them and from 1945 until 1976, 10 per cent of development in Cochabamba was illegal. From the 1970s the government has attempted to regularize the squatter settlements and the programs have largely failed due to corruption. A fresh initiative set up in 2002 did not prevent new settlements being squatted. In the 1990s, La Paz had 48 unauthorised graveyards where the poor buried their dead. The land was squatted and there was no record of how many people were buried in the cemeteries. There are also squatters in the forest lowlands who are illegal loggers. Indigenous peoples occupied a gold mine at Tacacoma in 2015 which they said was on their ancestral land. When 200 police officers attempted to evict them, four were taken hostage and one died.

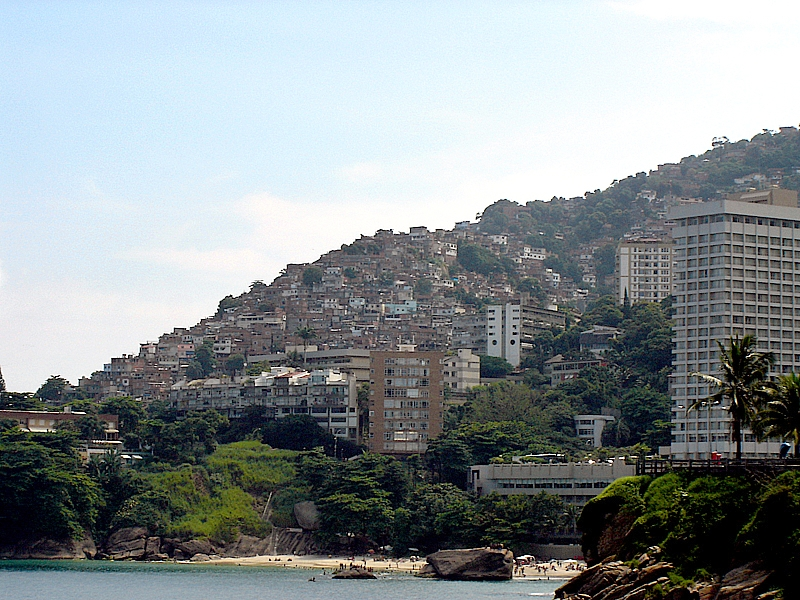
A favela in Rio de Janeiro

In Brazil, informal settlements are called favelas; a famous example is Rocinha in Rio de Janeiro, home to up to 180,000 people. The squats are mostly inhabited by the poorest strata of society, and usually lack much infrastructure and public services, but in some cases, already have reached the structure needed for a city. As of 2004, across Brazil there were 25 million people living in favelas. After failed attempts in the 1960s and 1970s to bulldoze slums out of existence, the authorities moved towards a policy of toleration. In São Paulo, until 1972 favelas were usually demolished; after that time they were permitted, meaning that in the next decade the number of squatters rose to one million. The largest favela is Heliópolis, with over 200,000 inhabitants as of 2018. It has been officially recognized as a regular neighborhood of the city. There are also a number of squatter buildings in the inner city, the most famous of which was a 22-storey building called Prestes Maia, whose inhabitants were ordered to leave in 2006. Various occupations in buildings and unoccupied areas in big cities, led by groups such as the Homeless Workers' Movement (MTST) or Downtown Roofless Movement (MSTC), have occurred. There are also rural squatter movements in Brazil, such as the Landless Workers' Movement (MST), which organise land occupations. For example, in Pontal do Paraná in the state of Paraná 112 occupations were carried out, housing 6,500 families.

The Colombian Constitution of 1991 states that housing is a universal human right. In 2010, Colombia was the country with the second most internally displaced people in the world, at an estimated 4 million. This was the result of an extended civil conflict between rebels, paramilitaries, cocaine traders and the state, which left 40% of rural land without legal title. In the capital Bogotá, squatting has traditionally not been the main technique for land acquisition; people tend to purchase land legally and then subdivide or develop it illegally, creating "pirate neighbourhoods". In 1970, 45.9% of Bogotá's population lived in these pirate neighbourhoods, as compared to 1.1% who were squatting.

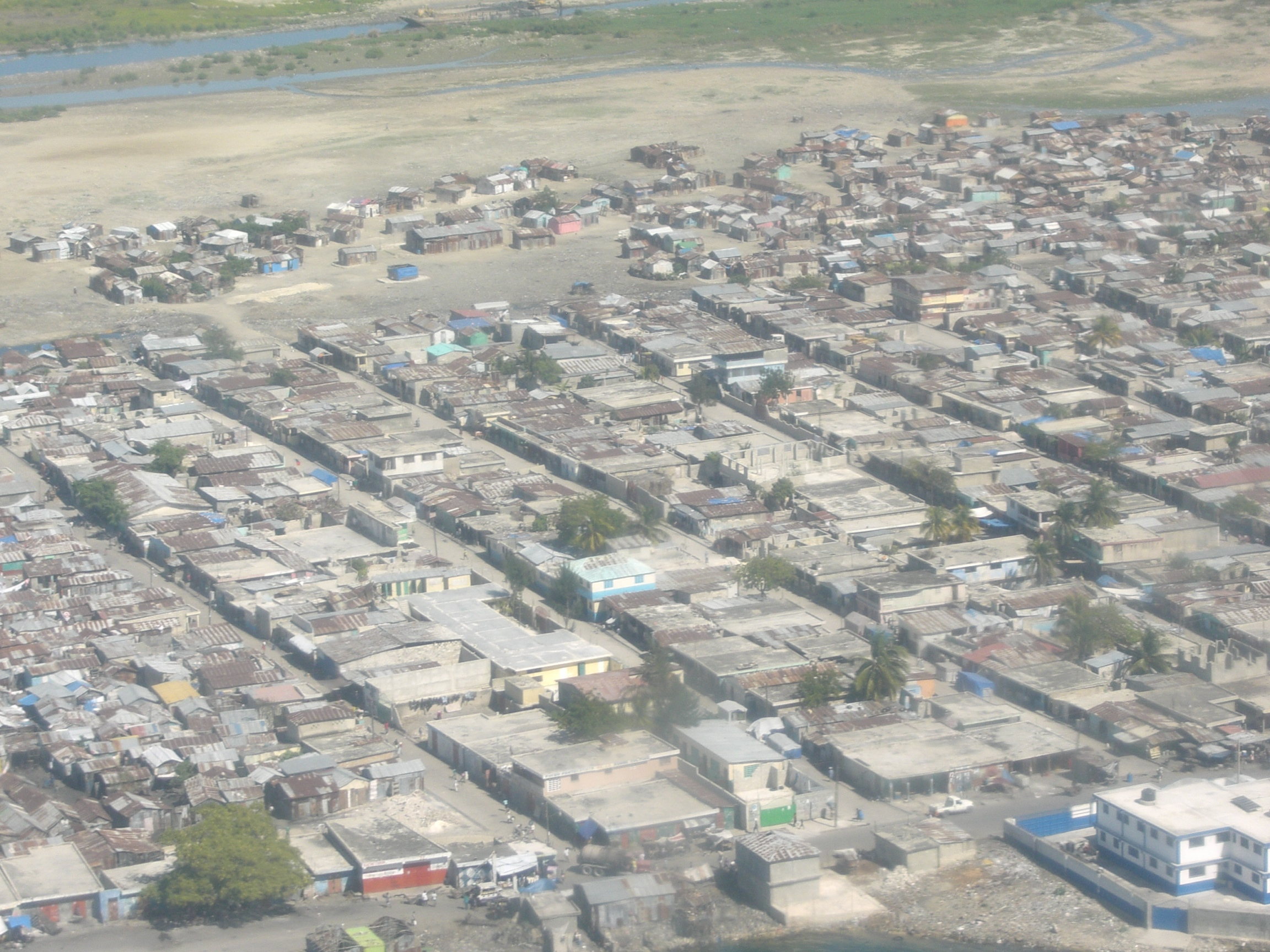
Cité Soleil in 2006

Following the Haitian Revolution (1791–1804), squatters in Haiti acquired smallholdings across the country. Cité Soleil was founded in 1958 to house workers, then grew rapidly to 80,000 people in the 1980s and 400,000 people in the 1990s. It became the largest slum in Haiti, housing people displaced from other areas. There is little infrastructure and the area frequently becomes flooded. Following the 2010 Haiti earthquake, 1.5 million people were displaced. One year later, 100,000 squatters had left the aid camps and were occupying land next to an official camp called Corail.

=== Oceania ===
On island nations such as Fiji, Kiribati and Samoa, informal settlements are known as squatter settlements. Unlike most Pacific Island countries, it is possible to sell or buy customary land in Kiribati. Zoning laws are not implemented by the government and not widely recognised by local people. On the island of Kiritimati, squatters live in both villages and on old Burns Philp copra plantations. On Rarotonga, the largest island in Cook Islands, three informal settlements are inhabited by people from Manihiki, Penrhyn and Pukapuka. The 3,000 dwellers are known as squatters although they have permission to live on the customary land.

In the 19th century, the British government claimed to own all of Australia and tried to control land ownership. Wealthy farmers of livestock claimed land for themselves and thus were known as squatters. This type of squatting is covered in greater detail at Squatting (Australian history). During the late 1940s the squatting of hundreds of empty houses and military camps, forced federal and state governments to provide emergency shelter during a period when Australians faced a shortage of more than 300 000 homes. In more recent times, there have been Australian squats in Canberra, Melbourne and Sydney. The Aboriginal Tent Embassy was set up in 1972 and is a permanent protest occupation. The 2016 Bendigo Street housing dispute saw squatters successfully contesting road-building plans. The Midnight Star squat was used as a self-managed social centre in a former cinema, before being evicted after being used as a convergence space during the 2002 World Trade Organization meeting.

== See also ==
- Abandonment (legal)
- Claim club
- Homelessness
- Hunter-gatherer
- Intentional community
- Land grabbing
- Right to housing
- Squatters union
- Treesitting
- Temporary use
