= Center Rog =

Rejuvenated public space in former bike factory, Ljubljana

Center Rog is a public institution that operates as a creative and social center in the renovated premises of the former Rog bicycle factory in Ljubljana, Slovenia. It is located at Trubarjeva cesta 72, by the Ljubljanica River, and is an example of the revitalization of industrial heritage into modern public infrastructure.

The founder of the Center Rog public institution is the City Municipality of Ljubljana. It officially opened its doors in November 2023.

== History ==
=== Beginnings ===
The building that now houses Center Rog was originally an industrial complex dating back to the late 19th century. The first production facility was built on this site in 1871 by Ivan Janesch as a leather workshop. His son, Ivan Janesch Jr., added another floor to the building in 1882 and expanded production to include leather goods. At the end of the 19th century, the factory employed up to 100 workers.

In 1900, the factory was taken over by leather wholesaler Karel Pollak, who modernized and expanded it, adding two more floors. Due to the economic crisis and debts, the factory went bankrupt in the 1930s. In 1938, it was taken over from the Municipal Savings Bank by Indus d.d., which was nationalized at the end of 1945.

=== Bicycle factory ===
After World War II, the Rog bicycle factory, which had previously operated in a smaller facility in Vič, moved to Trubarjeva Street. The bicycle factory was named after Kočevski Rog, where the headquarters of the Slovenian partisan army was located during the war. The most famous model of bicycle they produced was the Pony.

Production at the Trubarjeva Street facility was discontinued in 1991 when the building was no longer structurally safe. Production continued on a reduced scale on Letališka Street in Ljubljana until it was completely abandoned due to the collapse of the company, and the brand was sold. The factory building and the land it stood on became the property of Hypo Alpe Adria Bank. In 2000, the City Municipality of Ljubljana (under Mayor Vika Potočnik) decided to purchase the building, thus protecting this important industrial and cultural heritage site, covering an area of almost 10,000 m2 in the center of the city, from market forces.

=== The period of the Rog Autonomous Factory ===
The secondary use of the factory building began in the late 1990s, with occasional events (e.g., the Brejk festival, BIO). Later, squatters occupied the premises of the former bicycle factory and established the Autonomous Factory Rog. Individuals and groups from the fields of culture and art, sports, social work, and activism organized various cultural and artistic events in the premises of the former factory. Various concerts, performances, and other events took place on the ground floor. The first, second, and third floors housed individual painting studios and dance studios, where dance classes were also held. A gallery space was set up in the former warehouse. A circus arts hall was also set up in the factory premises, and a skate park was set up in the rooms where the galvanizing tanks used to be.

Organizations dealing with social issues and activism also operated as part of the Rog Autonomous Factory. The so-called Social Center Rog was home to the Civil Initiative of Erased Activists and the Migrant Workers' Initiative.

In 2007, users and the City Municipality of Ljubljana reached an informal agreement in principle on the temporary use of premises in a dilapidated factory that had neither electricity nor water.

From around 2013, the space was occupied by a second generation of temporary users, who rejected the concept of temporary use and demanded the factory space for permanent use and exclusively on their own terms. As mediation between the temporary users and the City of Ljubljana was unsuccessful, a legal dispute began in 2016, which was concluded in 2019 in favor of the City of Ljubljana. As a result, the municipality asserted its property rights through legal means. In January 2021, the Municipality of Ljubljana took over the building and began renovating the area.

The emptying of the factory sparked mixed reactions among the public. After the eviction of former users in 2021, a civil society initiative was formed that recognized Center Rog as a project of gentrification and "elitization of public space". In the period following the opening, individual non-governmental organizations, artists, and activists repeatedly called for a boycott due to exclusion and the denial of autonomous community practices.

At the opening in October 2023, a protest took place, during which there was a scuffle with security guards and police, who used tear gas. The police initiated misdemeanor proceedings against several individuals, while the management of Center Rog strongly condemned the vandalism of the facade and the attack on security guards.

== Development of Center Rog ==
The City of Ljubljana began the Rog factory revitalization project in 2007, when a project team of experts drew up the initial program design. The plan was originally based on a public-private partnership model, but this was halted by the economic crisis in 2008.

From 2010 onwards, a new development team began to devise a revitalization project, which was tested through the three-year Second Chance project, supported by European funds. The participatory development process, led under the auspices of MGML , involved more than 600 stakeholders, including temporary users of the factory, creators, educational and cultural organizations, decision-makers, entrepreneurs, international cultural workers, and neighbors. A new model began to develop, with an emphasis on creative industries and a shared production space where knowledge and ideas could be exchanged.

The results of the Second Chance development project were implemented through the RogLab pilot project, which was designed as a production, educational, and presentation space and operated as the first public fablab in Slovenia, supporting creators and manufacturers in bringing new ideas to life with technological knowledge and infrastructure. RogLab developed the potential content and operating methods of the future Center Rog on a small scale (a 28 m2 shipping container). In 2018, the RogLab team received an award for innovation from the Eurocities network of European cities for the Rog Center development model.

Center Rog was established as a public institution in June 2021. It covers more than 8,500 m2. The creative fields covered by Center Rog include design (product, fashion, industrial), architecture, engineering, culinary arts, and digital manufacturing.

It is designed as a public production space with nine shared production workshops or labs: FabLab, food lab, textile lab, wood lab, metal lab, green lab, ceramics lab, glass lab, and jewelry lab. The production labs are accessible to the public through an affordable membership and usage fee system. In addition to the workshops, the building houses project studios, which are allocated through public tenders for free use by individuals and collectives developing socially and environmentally responsible and innovative products. There are also five residential apartments available for foreign artists, intended for the exchange of knowledge and networking between Slovenian artists and foreign centers. Slovenian artists from outside central Slovenia can also stay there on a short-term basis. Center Rog also houses several exhibition, event, and social spaces, a branch of the Ljubljana City Library, a café, a bistro, a restaurant, and six retail outlets along Petkovškovo nabrežje.

== Architecture ==
The central building of the Rog factory complex has been declared a cultural heritage site since 2001 on the basis of the Decree on the Protection of the Poljane and Šempeter Suburbs and is one of the last preserved examples of old industrial architecture in Ljubljana. It is the first building in the region to be constructed of reinforced concrete, with elements of Czech Cubism on the southern façade, designed by architect Jože Plečnik.

For the renovation of the former factory, the solution by the BAX architectural firm from Barcelona, co-founded by Slovenian architect Boris Bežan, was selected in a public urban planning and architectural competition in 2008.

Center Rog has received several domestic and international awards for its renovation, including the Golden Pencil Award from the Chamber of Architecture and Spatial Planning of Slovenia and recognition from the European Centre for Cultural Heritage (Europa Nostra) for good practice in the renovation of industrial heritage.

=== Park of the Erased ===
On the northern side of Center Rog, on the former factory grounds, lies the Park of the Erased. The name of the park was proposed by Amnesty International Slovenia and the Civil Initiative of Erased Activists. The name commemorates the 30th anniversary of the erasure.

In 2022, Center Rog announced a public competition for a memorial in the Park of the Erased. From among 12 proposals, a nine-member expert commission selected the design by architect and scenographer Aleksandar Vujović, internet artist Vuk Ćosić and designer and eco-activist Irena Woelle. The memorial in the shape of the letter Ć is made of unpolished concrete. Part of the letter is buried in the ground, with only the upper half visible on the surface. The letter Ć does not exist in the Slovenian alphabet, but it is present in many surnames in the republics of the former Yugoslavia, from where most of the unjustly erased were removed from the permanent population register of Slovenia in 1992. The monument commemorates the victims of erasure and shows that letters in surnames and names can determine people's lives.
