= Rooftop slum =

Type of illegal housing

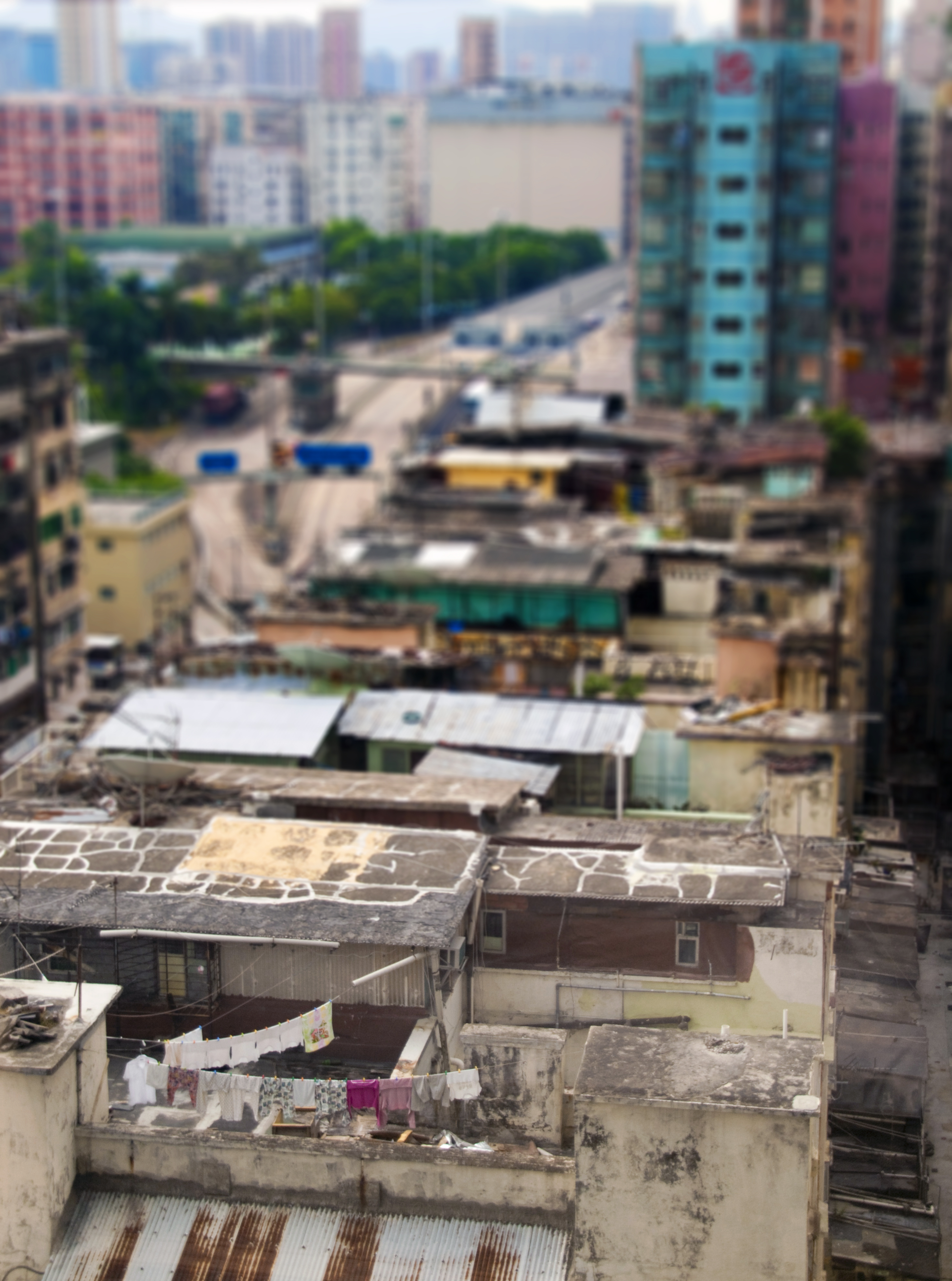
Rooftop slums in Kowloon, Hong Kong, 2009

Rooftop slum (Chinese: 天台屋) or penthouse slum generally refers to illegal housing on the rooftops of apartment buildings. In Hong Kong, some people are unable to afford traditional apartments and are forced to wait years for affordable public housing. They therefore live in squatted shacks on top of buildings. According to the Hong Kong population census, there were 47,091 rooftop dwellers in 2011 and this number is likely to have dropped as working class areas are redeveloped.

== Context ==
A housing crisis developed in the 1950s and 1960s when a large number of refugees left mainland China and moved to Hong Kong, creating a large, unmet demand for affordable housing options and squatting in shanty towns or rooftop slums. The census of 1971 reported 27,000 people living in rooftop dwellings. In 1956, the estimated squatter population of Hong Kong was 450,000. Hong Kong is now one of the most densely populated places in the world. Between 2009 and 2014, residential property prices doubled.

== Rooftop dwellings ==
According to the Hong Kong population census, there were 47,091 rooftop dwellers in 2011, 48,570 in 2006 and 77,930 in 2001. Many of these squats were to be found in the old Kowloon districts of Sham Shui Po, Kwun Tong, and Tai Kok Tsui. For example, the Hoi On Building in Tai Kok Tsui housed over 100 people living on the roof in shacks. Some were made out of rudimentary materials such as wood, others were constructed more sturdily with brick walls and air-conditioning.

The rooftop dwellings, generally built atop tenement buildings from the 1950s and 1960s, typically range from 97 to 301 square feet (9.0 to 28.0 m^{2}). As of 2011, they were regularly sold in a grey market for around HK$50,000. The shanty homes are contrasted against legal apartments of Hong Kong, the "world's most expensive luxury city". Many people have lived in rooftop dwellings for over 30 years. New residents are from other Asian countries, like Nepal or Pakistan, or from mainland China.

Social worker Sze Lai-Shan, from the Society for Community Organization, comments:

The government doesn't know much about this and they don’t bother to know because they don’t have a rehousing policy for these people [...] They don’t want to make them [the rooftop dwellers] homeless, so they let them stay.

— Sze Lai-Shan

The number of illegal dwellings has reduced dramatically as working class areas of Hong Kong are redeveloped. However, as of 2011 there were still more than 300,000 people on the waiting list for public housing and just 15,000 new apartment units built every year. When the rooftop dwellers are evicted, they can receive compensation of between HK$10,000 and HK$100,000 from the property developers or they can simply have their shacks burnt down. If they are offered public housing, this can be on islands far from their place of work and children's schools.

== See also ==
- Kowloon Walled City
- Shek Kip Mei Fire
- Housing in Hong Kong
