= Metelkova =

Cultural centre in Ljubljana, Slovenia

Coordinates: 46.0564°N 14.5167°E

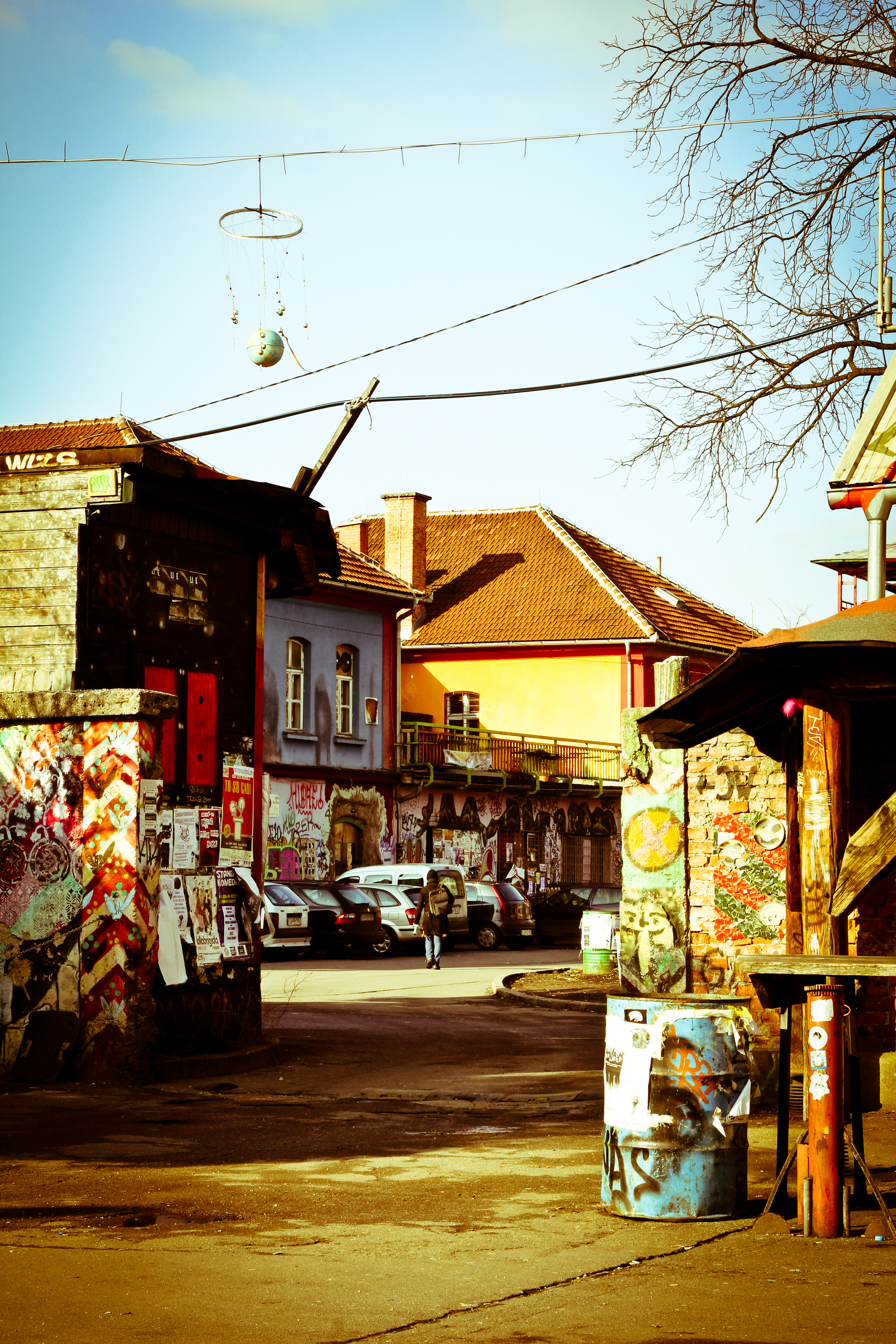
Metelkova in 2012

Metelkova (full name in Slovene: Avtonomni kulturni center Metelkova mesto, "Metelkova City Autonomous Cultural Centre", referred to by the acronym AKC) is a self-managed social centre in the centre of Ljubljana, Slovenia's capital city. It consists of seven buildings (military barracks) extended over a total area of 12500m^{2}, which have been squatted since September 1993. The squat is named after nearby Metelko Street (Slovene: Metelkova ulica).

== History ==
The contested history of Metelkova as a squat begins on June 25, 1991 with the Slovenian and Croatian declaration of independence. The military barracks were built by the Austro-Hungarian Army, then used by the Royal Yugoslav Army, Italy's National Republican Army, the Wehrmacht and the Yugoslav People's Army before falling derelict.

In 1991 the Network for Metelkova, composed of more than 200 alternative and youth organizations, asked the municipality of Ljubljana for permission to use those barracks for peaceful and creative purposes. As a response, Ljubljana authorities gave the Network for Metelkova formal permission to stay and use the site. Nevertheless, those promises given by the municipality were never really maintained. This example on the request for permission demonstrates the ambiguous role of the municipality of Ljubljana towards the Network for Metelkova, in which the municipality seems to allow them to stay there, but in fact it does not want them to stay.

This ambiguous role of the municipality of Ljubljana in regard to Metelkova and its Network has remained over the years. In 1993 the cultural centre became a squat when a commissioner mandated the demolition of some barracks that were promised to the Network, with the aim of illegally reconverting the area into a commercial site. At that time, Metelkova came into being as an illegal occupation (a squat) and was redefined as an autonomous social center in 1995.

Since then, the centre has been a site of tolerance of minorities.

Another example of the ambiguity in state and municipality actions towards the Network for Metelkova and Metelkova itself are the subsidies from Ljubljana’s city administration for the construction of a little summer lodge also known as the Small School (from the Slovene: Mala Šola). Nevertheless, the lodge, planned and constructed in 2001 by volunteers, was immediately defined as abusive. In fact, the construction was followed by the request of its demolition, right after another municipal office reported it to the State Inspectorate for the Environment and Spatial Planning. After several failed attempts, the building was demolished on August 2, 2006. Although there are plans to rebuild the building, it has not been reconstructed since then.

In the 2000s, new actors became involved in the Metelkova autonomous zone, for example the LGBT community, other non-governmental organizations and even UNESCO. Although it did not help Metelkova to receive proper legal status, the area was recognized as a national cultural heritage in 2005.

== Squatting activities ==
In September 1991 the Network for Metelkova was born, merging the Movement for the Culture of Peace and Nonviolence and The Student Cultural Centre Association. When, in 1993, the Metelkova declared its independence from the communal possession, a group of young activists occupied the site. From 1993 onwards, the site has been occupied, in an illegal way, mainly by artists, activists and young students, organising a rich agenda of cultural activities. Nowadays, many artists have their own workshops in Metelkova and some NGOs and LGBT associations have their offices there. Art exhibitions, performances, concerts and engaged activities have taken place in the buildings of Metelkova.

The development of the Metelkova “brand” as an alternative place can be seen as another reason that can explain the existence of Metelkova: in fact, the municipality of Ljubljana sees the presence of a space of this type in a rather positive way because it attracts a large number of tourists and contributes to the promotion of the Slovenian capital in the world.

== Metelkova and concepts of urbanism ==
Over the last few years Metelkova, like Christiania in Copenhagen, has been the subject of several studies and reflections on the phenomenon of squatting and on living with different laws and institutions that surround it. These districts mentioned above can be defined as heterotopic spaces since they have been present for decades in parallel to the cities of which they are legally part. Nevertheless, they are characterized by a particular relationship with the authorities of their cities in comparison to other districts.

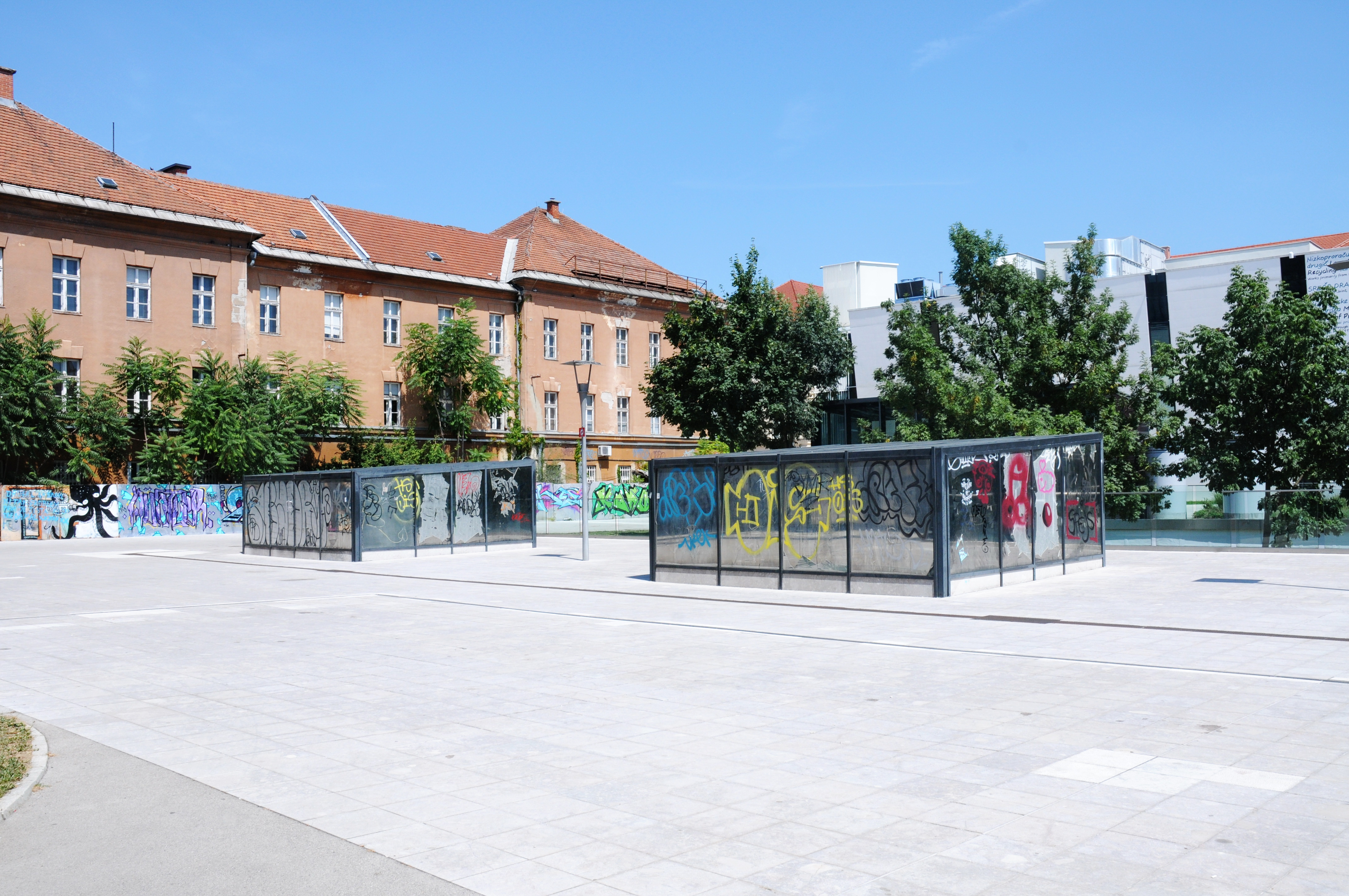
Place in front of the Museum of Contemporary Art.

Nowadays, it can be said that there are three different areas in Metelkova: one part is defined by art and social life, the second by civil engagement and the third is commercial; the squatters act in all three areas mentioned. Metelkova's differentiation into three possible sub-entities can be seen through the arrival of different institutional actors in the neighbourhood, such as the Museum of Contemporary Art, different NGOs and different commercial activities, such as the Hotel Celica, which reuses some of the areas of the old barracks.

Squatters represent the heart of the matter of legality and formality in Metelkova: the autonomous part is considered to be in a legal and administrative limbo defined through tolerance and legitimization toward city's authority. A possible explanation for this situation is to be found in the nature of the squatting in Metelkova: in fact the old buildings of the Yugoslav army are not occupied for the sole purpose of living there, but also for the aim of producing culture. From this perspective, it is possible to determine the beginning of the tolerance: since 1997, when Ljubljana was designated as the European Capital of Culture, Metelkova stopped hosting permanent residents, following an agreement reached with the municipality, whereby the city decided to dedicate the Metelkova buildings to the promotion of culture and art.

Finally, the example of Metelkova can be related to the concept of informality in order to explain the situation: at its very first beginning, Metelkova could be considered as completely informal since the occupation of the military warehouse by the squatters was considered illegal and not rules- and code-compliant. Nowadays the situation has slightly changed: the city of Ljubljana is now linked to the Metelkova’s site, for example thanks to the presence of different institutional actors. It is therefore possible to assume that the situation is constantly changing and that a part of Metelkova is actually normalized and institutionalized, despite the fact that the type of culture and urban development is still not compliant with building codes and urban planning regulation.

== Controversies ==
In 2005, Metelkova was declared a national cultural heritage site, prevented from being part of an alternative economic development and from attempts for densification and rehabilitation of the sector through urban planning. Moreover, the European Cultural Fund attributes financial support to Metelkova.

This general national and international interest in Metelkova represents a sort of insurance for Metelkova’s durability. Besides, it can support the economy of Ljubljana in a context where culture adds value to cities and contributes to cities’ regeneration. For example, Metelkova on its own is said to contribute for 40% of all the music concerts in Ljubljana.

Metelkova is defined as a self-managed and well-organized community. There is no legal status for the site, and its urbanism is informal. For example, residents of Metelkova initially illegally siphoned water from Ljubljana. However, today Metelkova is legally connected to the city's water system and power grid. Metelkova is considered as a squat and there is not a clear position of political parties about the legitimacy of the cultural hub. This paradox around Metelkova makes it difficult to imagine future decisions, especially because military brownfields are good places for urban densification and rehabilitation through urban planning. Besides, some associations that defend feminism and LGBT communities are located in Metelkova, resulting in some attacks from neo-Nazi and skinhead groups.

== See also ==
- Squatting in Slovenia
- Freetown Christiania
- Rog (factory)
