= Frances Street Squats =

1990 squatted project in Vancouver, Canada

Coordinates: 49.2794°N 123.0681°W

The Frances Street Squats were a set of six squatted houses, including one women-only building, that existed between February and November 1990 in Vancouver, Canada. They were occupied by SAVE (Squatters Alliance of Vancouver East) and took a stand against development which was generally supported by local people. The Vancouver Police Department evicted the buildings.

== Occupation ==
In 1989, property developer Ning Yee purchased six houses on Frances Street in Vancouver, Canada, and evicted the tenants. In February 1990, four of the six houses were squatted after they had been scheduled for demolition. The other two houses were then also occupied, with one being women-only. The squatters set up a communal garden and a free shop. Two more buildings were occupied on McLean street and quickly evicted.

Thirty six people were housed in the Frances Street squats, which were named the Big House, Didley Squat, the Eco Squat, the Stein House, the Token Squat and Bush Wimmins. In August, Ning Yee asked the squatters to leave and in response they barricaded two of the houses in expectation of eviction. The neighbours were generally supportive of the six squatted houses in a row and community organizations such as the Downtown Eastside Residents Association and the Grandview-Woodland Area Council supported them.

The squatters formed a group called SAVE (Squatters Alliance of Vancouver East). Spokesperson Penny Singh said "We will not be bullied out by uniforms, black boots and badges". A SAVE press release stated "Habitable houses should not be left unoccupied". They used the solidarity of their group to address the Vancouver city council about the housing crisis in the city.

== Eviction ==
The Frances Street squats were evicted on November 27, 1990, when the Vancouver Police Department (VPD) deployed over 80 officers. 12 were charged with mischief and obstructing a police officer. Twenty five officers were from the Emergency Response Team and the city also engaged a helicopter, a bomb squad, police vans, fire engines, dumpster trucks and ambulances. Constable Bob Cooper stated that the VPD had "very reliable information that radical elements have taken control of the issue" and that squatters were in possession of "three shotguns, two handguns, molotov-cocktails, and other homemade weapons". After searching the site for two days, the police found no weapons.

== Legacy ==
No criminal charges were made. Following the eviction, the squatters occupied the offices of the Mayor Gordon Campbell. Representatives of the Committee of Progressive Electors condemned the police for acting in a "inappropriate and vulgar" way at the eviction and requested a public inquiry, comparing the events to the Oka Crisis. Mayor Campbell defended the actions of the police and the Vancouver Sun confirmed no weapons had been found.

By April 1991, the site had been demolished. Ning Yee had sold the properties on and the former squatters were renting.

A documentary film, The Beat of Frances Street, was created by Eleven Foot Productions in December 1990.

== See also ==
- Anarchism in Canada
