= Squatting in Slovenia =

Squatting in Slovenia is the occupation of derelict buildings or unused land without the permission of the owner. Housing was illegally built from the 1960s onwards and informal settlements have been set up by Romani people or poor immigrants. In the capital Ljubljana, there is the autonomous zone of Metelkova and the Rog self-managed social centre was evicted in early 2021.

== History ==
As with other cities in Yugoslavia, squatting was present in the main city Ljubljana from the 1960s onwards. By the early 1970s, half of all private construction was illegal and this resulted in the 1972 Black Housing Law which attempted to regulate squatter housing. A report stated there were 2,484 illegal properties in the city. The squatters were not from the poorest sector of society and most had secure employment. Reasons for squatting at that time included bad governance and the lack of affordable housing. The lengthy bureaucratic process to gain title to land was also cited as a factor, as well as the lack of punishment. Squatters might be sentenced to a fine and a maximum of thirty days in prison, often reduced on appeal. A total of 15,000 illegally constructed buildings across the country were identified in 1985. After independence, squatting did not become a widespread phenomenon in Slovenia, although it is a tactic used by poor immigrants and Romani people who set up informal settlements. There are also activist projects such as AC Molotov, Rog and Metelkova.

== Rog Ljubljana ==
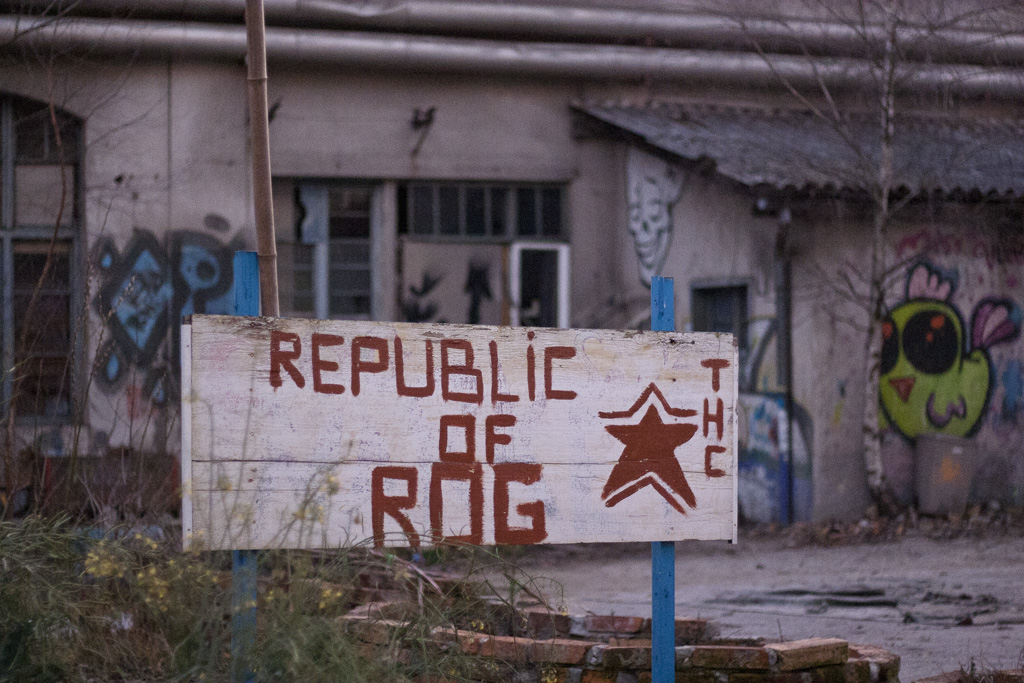
Sign outside Rog

Rog is a former bicycle factory which was occupied by artists in 2006. It became a self-managed social centre where political and cultural events were organised. It was evicted in 2021 by the city council, which plans to demolish the site and build a contemporary arts centre and a tram depot for Ljubljana tram revival. Twelve people resisting the eviction were arrested.

== Autonomous cultural center Metelkova Mesto ==
Metelkova was occupied in 1993 by activists inspired by the Dutch squatters movement. It has developed into an autonomous zone, where activists live and work and there are different spaces for political and cultural events. Punks played a strong role in the beginning of the project then their influence waned. There is now a hostel and Metelkova has become a tourist attraction for the city. In 2015, the mayor of Ljubljana Zoran Janković commented "Metelkova is a centre of urban culture".
