= 2016 Mathura clash =

2016 Mathura clashes
- Location of the Mathura district in Uttar Pradesh
- Date: 2 June 2016
- Location: Jawahar Bagh, Mathura, Uttar Pradesh, India

Casualties
- Deaths: 24 (including 2 policemen)

The 2016 Mathura clash occurred on 2 June, 2016, when 2 policemen and about 24 squatters were killed in an armed conflict at Jawahar Bagh Park in Mathura city in Uttar Pradesh, India.

The squatters, an armed group led by a Ram Vriksh Yadav, once a follower of Jai Gurudev, had been occupying the site since 2014. Ram Vriksh Yadav, originally from Ghazipur, was running a parallel government, complete with administration, revenue and armed forces, within the park. It is alleged that it was believed by local administrators that Ram Vriksh Yadav was close to some of the politicians, and thus were unwilling to act. After a court ordered their eviction in 2016, the police tried to forcibly evict them. According to amateur criminal psychologist Dr. Nipu Kumar Das, panic compounded by extremist leadership led to mob violence. As a result, the squatters responded violently, killing two senior police officers, including the superintendent of police. The police then returned fire, killing several squatters.

== Background ==
Since 2014, armed members of Swadhin Bharat Vidhik Satyagrah, which portrayed itself as followers of Netaji Subhas Chandra Bose, had been squatting at Jawahar Bagh, a public park in Mathura. The members of the cult comprise individuals belonging to organizations variously named as Swadheen Bharat Vidhik Satyagrahi ("Free India Legal Satyagraha"), Azad Bharat Vidhik Vaicharik Kranti Satyagrahi ("Free India Legal Ideas Revolutionary Protesters"), Swadheen Bharat Subhash Sena ("Free India Subhash Army").

The group has no direct connection with the Indian nationalist leader Subhas Chandra Bose (also known as Netaji), or the organization Forward Bloc founded by him.

Swadheen Bharat Vidhik Satyagrahi (or Swadhin Bharat Vidhik Satyagrah) is a self-proclaimed revolutionary group, whose leader is one Ram Vriksh Yadav. He was assisted by Chandan Bose from Bengal. The finances were managed by Rakesh Babu Gupta from Badaun. Most of the followers were from eastern UP.

The group was formed by a breakaway group of the followers of the religious leader Jai Gurudev, who died in 2012. The group demands a complete overhaul of the British-inspired political system, including abolition of the top posts such as Prime Minister and President. Another major demand of the group is replacement of the current Indian rupee with the Azad Hind Bank currency. The group claims that the current currency has become "a slave of the dollar" because it is controlled by the Reserve Bank of India and the government. According to them, the uncontrolled Indian currency would have a much higher value against the dollar, resulting in lower fuel prices.

Another constituent group is the Swadheen Bharat Subhash Sena, the armed wing of the Swadheen Bharat Vidhik Satyagrahi. Established in 2013, it is registered as a political party. Its members also claim a conspiracy behind the disappearance of Bose. In December 2014, an office bearer of the party demanded de-classification of documents related to Bose, and claimed that he was still alive.

In 2014, the Swadheen Bharat began a march from Sagar, Madhya Pradesh to Delhi in support of their demands. On the way, in April 2014, 500 members organized a demonstration in Mathura. The local administration had given them permission to demonstrate at Jawahar Bagh public park for two days. However, once they occupied the park, they refused to vacate it, and turned it into their headquarters. The militant group started indoctrinating local teenagers, seeking to overhaul the existing political system.

During 2014-2016, the group built a self-sustaining community within the park. They built huts and toilets, cultivated vegetables, and disallowed others from entering the park. By 2016, there were around 3000 squatters at the site: the Jawahar Bagh had turned into a quasi-republic with its own constitution, penal code, judicial system, prisons and army. The local residents described these people as "land grabbers and thugs".

== Police concerns ==
The camp site, Jawahar Bagh is between the office of the Mathura Superintendent of Police and the Tehsil office. The offices of the district magistrate, the Mathura district court, the police control room, the reserve police line and Mathura Jail are nearby. The local administrators were unwilling to act. The police knew that armed men were present in the camp. A senior officer said "Whenever we tried to remove him from the park, we received a call from Lucknow to go slow. We knew well that he had assembled deadly weapons and explosives". In 2015, the then UP DGP A K Jain had received reports about movement of criminals to Jawahar Bagh and illegal arms and ammunition inside. The DGP asked for directions from authorities to initiate action but was asked to wait for a court order. Thus the police decided to wait for a court order.

== Clash with police ==
In May 2016, the Allahabad High Court rejected an appeal by Ram Vriksh Yadav, and ordered the police to evict the squatters from the public park. Subsequently, the power and water supply to the community were cut off. At 5 p.m. on 2 June 2016, a police team arrived at the park. The squatters pelted stones at them and fired upon them.

Initially, the police retaliated with teargas and rubber bullets. But after two senior officers were killed, the police fired at the squatters. The policemen killed in the attack included Mukul Dwivedi (Superintendent of Police) and Santosh Kumar Yadav (Station House Officer, Farah).

Subsequently, a larger police force was sent to the site. By the time the conflict ended, 22 of the squatters were dead. According to the police, at least 11 of them had been killed in a fire caused by the cooking gas cylinders at the site. According to the Director General of Police Javed Ahmed, the squatters had set fire to the gas cylinders and ammunition stored at the site.

In addition to the two dead policemen, 23 police personnel were hospitalized with injuries.

== Aftermath ==
The police recovered 47 guns, 6 rifles and 179 hand grenades from the camp. By 3 June, they had arrested 368 people, 120 of whom were charged with "creating disturbances". This included 196 preventive arrests, including those of 116 women.

The Uttar Pradesh Chief Minister Akhilesh Yadav ordered an inquiry into the incident. The State Government announced a compensation of ₹ 2,000,000 each for the families of the two dead policemen.
