= Kiefernstraße =

Street in Düsseldorf, Germany

Coordinates: 51.2192°N 6.8096°E

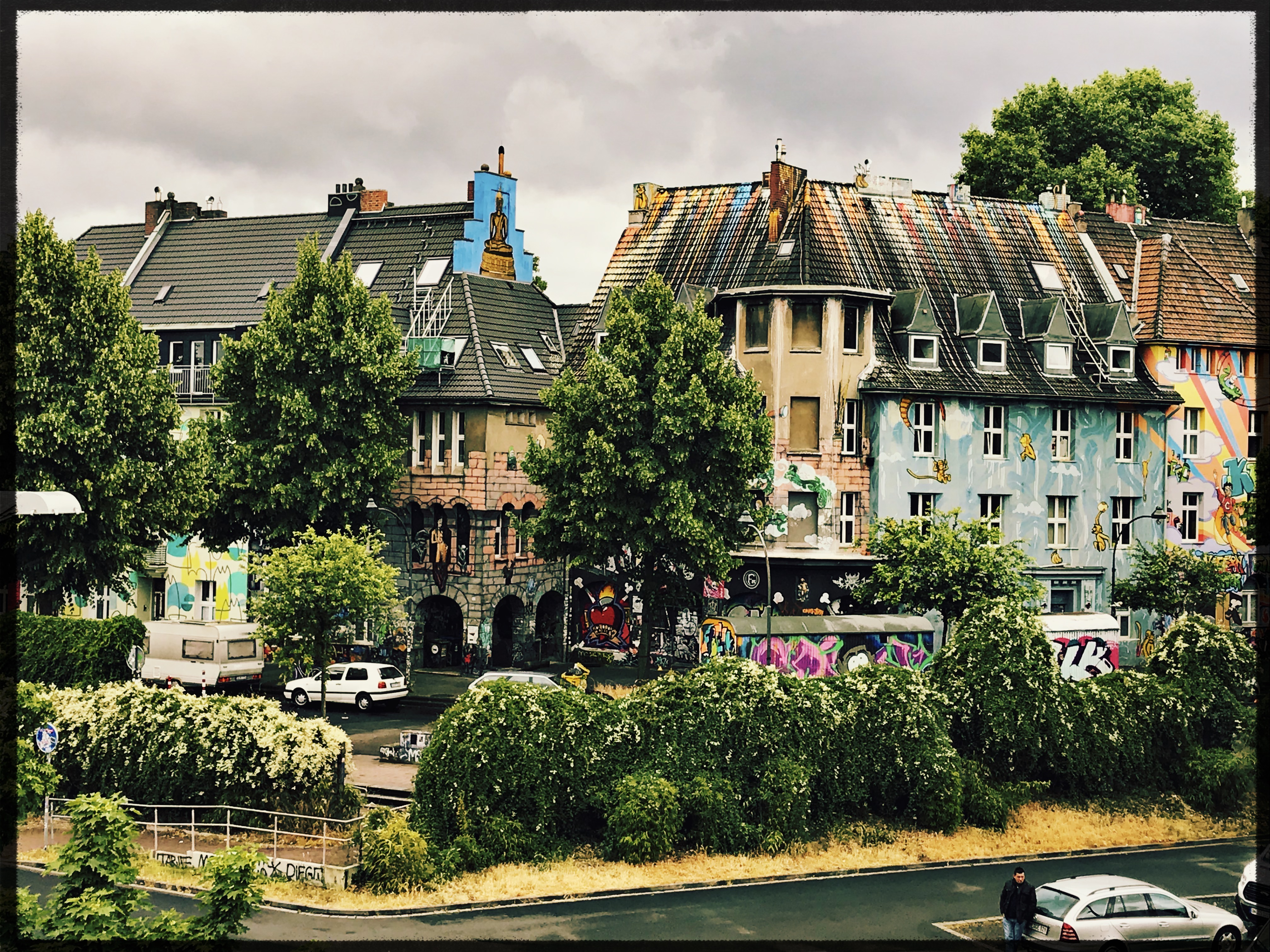
- Kiefernstraße in 2020
- Length: 380 m (1,250 ft)
- Location: Düsseldorf, on the border of south Flingern and Oberbilk

Other
- Known for: Street art, squats, arrest of terrorists

Kiefernstraße (Note: Spelled Kiefernstrasse in all caps and when the letter ß is not available.) ( pronounced ['ki:fɐn'ʃtra:sə]) is a street in the Flingern-Süd district of Düsseldorf that became notorious in the 1980s for squatting. In the mid-1980s there were connections to the Baader–Meinhof Gang. Nowadays, the former squatters have regular leases.

== Location ==
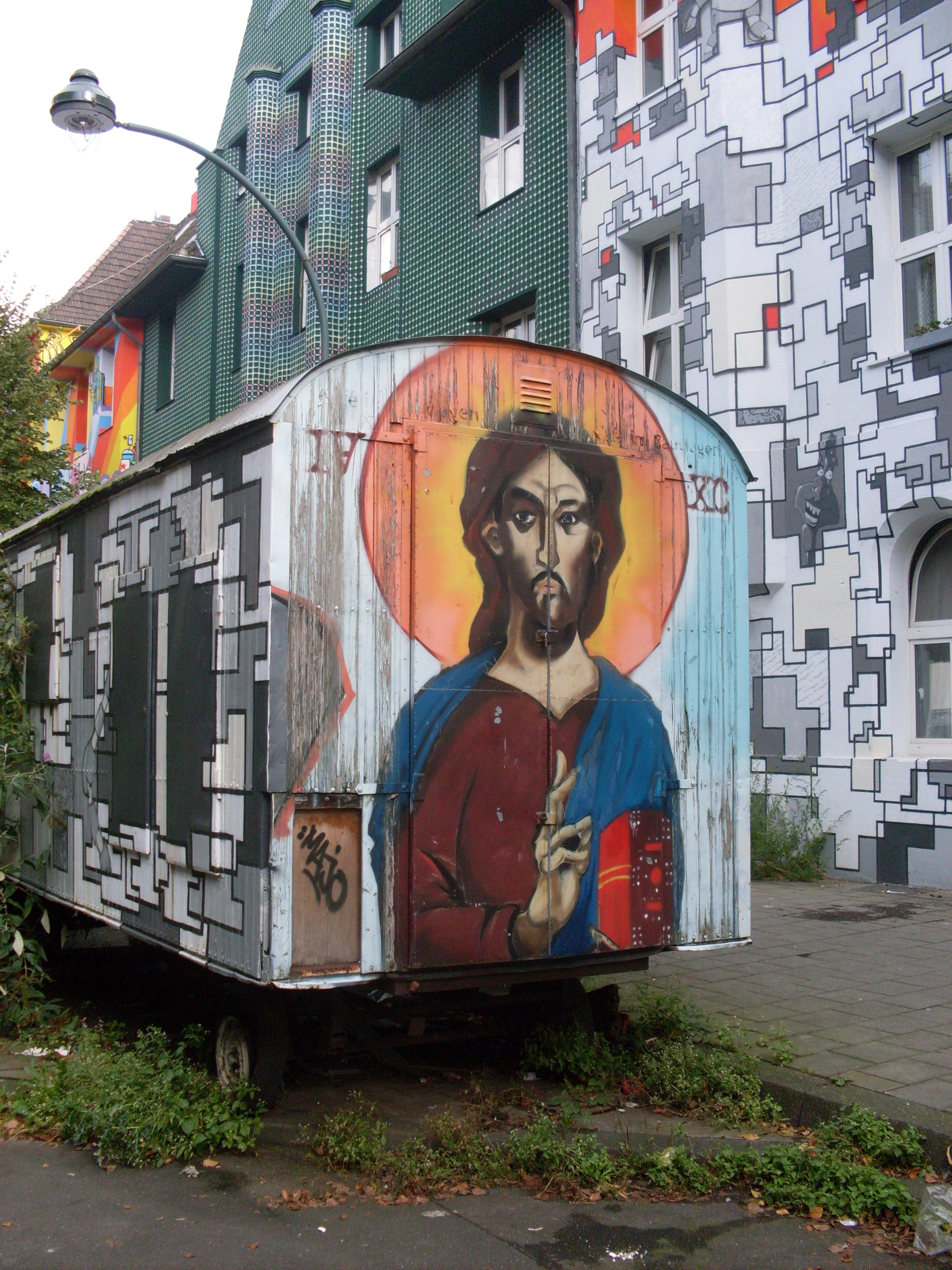
Painted construction trailer

Kiefernstraße is located at the edge of Flingern-Süd, on the border of Oberbilk. The street runs southwest to northeast from Fichtenstraße for about 180 metres (200 yd) and then bends to the east in the direction of Erkrather Straße, where Kiefernstraße terminates after another180 metres (200 yd). The street is an island of residential housing in the middle of industrial estates and derelict industrial plant. It is also separated from other residential areas by two main roads, Erkrather Straße and Werdener Straße (B 8), and a goods railway line.

== History ==
Kiefernstraße was inaugurated on 30 September 1902, and apartment blocks were built for the workers of the neighbouring Klöckner steelworks, the first apartments being occupied in 1905. In 1975 the buildings became municipal property, following the closure of the steelworks. It was planned to demolish the houses and create an industrial estate on the site.

In 1977 the owners began to terminate existing tenancy agreements, although affordable housing was scarce in Düsseldorf. By 1981, when over 100 apartments had already been evacuated by their original tenants, social services placed refugees, mainly from Africa, in some apartments. Following that, 60 apartments were taken over by people looking for somewhere to live. The authorities negotiated with an action group representing the squatters, and finally concluded agreements legalizing the squats, but they also indicated that they would not tolerate further squats, since the apartments were needed for refugees. Further squats followed, however, and the municipal authorities reacted with charges of criminal trespass.

In cooperation with a neighbouring action group, the residents collected over 600 signatures, demanding that the town re-think the town planning, keep the street, and turn over the apartments to the residents. The town did nothing while the residents began to improve the apartments, which had been neglected for years. In 1982, residents were evicted from other areas of the town and some of them moved to Kiefernstraße.

The squatters lived on the odd-numbered side of the street.

On 2 August 1986 Eva Haule, a member of the Baader–Meinhof Gang, was arrested, together with two Kiefernstraße residents in Rüsselsheim. This was followed by a massive raid with 800 police. For a time, the street was cordoned off by police. There were further raids and demonstrations in the course of the following year. Helmut Linssen, then General Secretary of the CDU in North Rhine-Westphalia called Kiefernstraße the centre of terrorism in the Federal Republic of Germany (Note: "German: ... das Zentrum des Terrorismus in der Bundesrepublik Deutschland schlechthin") In 1987 the authorities concluded tenancy agreements with the squatters. Many of the tenancy agreements ran until 30 November 2008, which resulted in insecurity for the residents. In September 2008 the tenants were informed that the tenancy agreements would be renewed indefinitely.

In 2007 new subsidized housing was erected at the corner of Erkrather Straße on the former car park of a Henkel works that had closed. Next to that, a drive-in restaurant was built. A Portuguese restaurant moved into the premises of the former Swan workers' pub. The new building complex of the district and regional courts was built within walking distance of Kiefernstraße. In March 2010 a large centre for specialist retailers was opened on an adjacent site.

== Present ==
Kiefernstraße is home to 800 people from 40 nations, including punks, doctors, and lawyers. It has long been a meeting point for alternative culture. The house fronts are painted with images reflecting some of the ideas and aspirations of the residents. Claimed to be the biggest graffiti wall in the world by some it is a stopping off point for many tourists who enjoy snapping their own personal image of the best alternative yet to "ordentliche Mietverhaeltnisse". A measure of anarchy still reigns in this unusual street which attracts more visitors than its contrasting opponent "Koenigs Allee" in the center of Duesseldorf.

The former squatters still mainly live on the odd-numbered side of the street.

== Sights and attractions ==
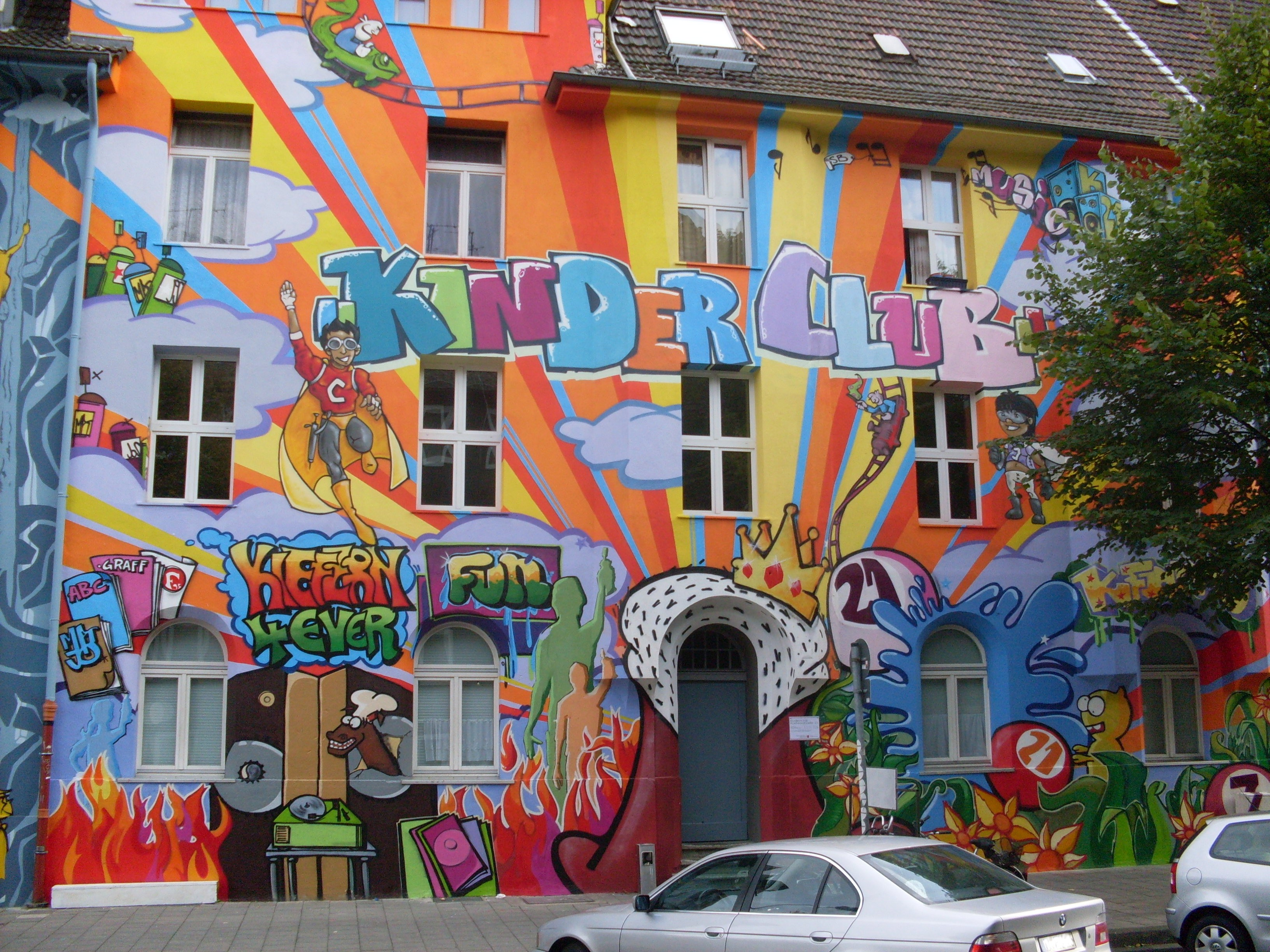
"Children's Club"

- The fronts of the houses on the odd-numbered side of the street were painted in street-art style for a length of 200 metres.
- No. 4 accommodates the "Kulturbureau Kiefernstrasse" (K4).
- No. 21 houses the music studio K21 Music.
- No. 23 houses the last Düsseldorf punk club AK 47 (formerly Nix Da).
- No. 35 houses the meeting place Red House.
- For young people there are a number of quarter pipes on the street.
- Every year there is a street festival, and there are a number of other special events.
