= Temporary use =

Time-limited use of empty urban buildings

Temporary use of empty spaces is a practice in urbanism aiming to revitalize empty spaces in urban areas, especially abandoned and decaying buildings.

Many spaces are left empty by owners because they currently do not have plans with the space, no capital for its renovation or further building, or cannot sell or rent the space at the price they want. Instead of waiting with an empty space, which can often mean being additional taxed by the municipality, they can offer a temporary use of the space. This allows various community members to obtain the space for their social, cultural, or other needs, under often more favorable terms. The property owner often has less requirements than in the case of a normal lease: they do not have to maintain the spaces and can cancel the use at a much shorter notice. On the other hand, temporary users can use the space at no or symbolical cost, and often maintain the spaces themselves.

Such approach is perceived as win-win for both property owners who get tax benefits, and users and a wider city community who get new content in those spaces. Moreover, buildings are less prone to decay because they are in use. Furthermore, such use is intrinsically bottom-up driven by citizens and can demonstrate needs in a city which would otherwise be left undiscovered.

== Criticism ==
Many temporary use projects prove the benefit to the city and develop and go beyond the merely temporary use of buildings. This requires that temporary use is re-imagined and restructured:

Ziehl therefore calls for avoiding the term “temporary use” if possible when talking of concepts for creative re-appropriation of urban space (see also temporary appropriation). The decisive factor, he says, is not at bottom the time period of the projects, but rather that here the citizens themselves are driving the development. “Investors and project developers don’t come into it.” Instead of interim use he would therefore prefer to speak of “user-supported developments”, and instead of temporary spaces of “second-hand spaces”. “It’s really supposed to be about establishing good projects in a place for a longer term.”

== Examples ==
- Rog (factory), an unsuccessful attempt at introducing temporary use in Slovenia
