= Squatting in Nigeria =

Occupation of unused land or derelict buildings in Nigeria

Nigeria on globe

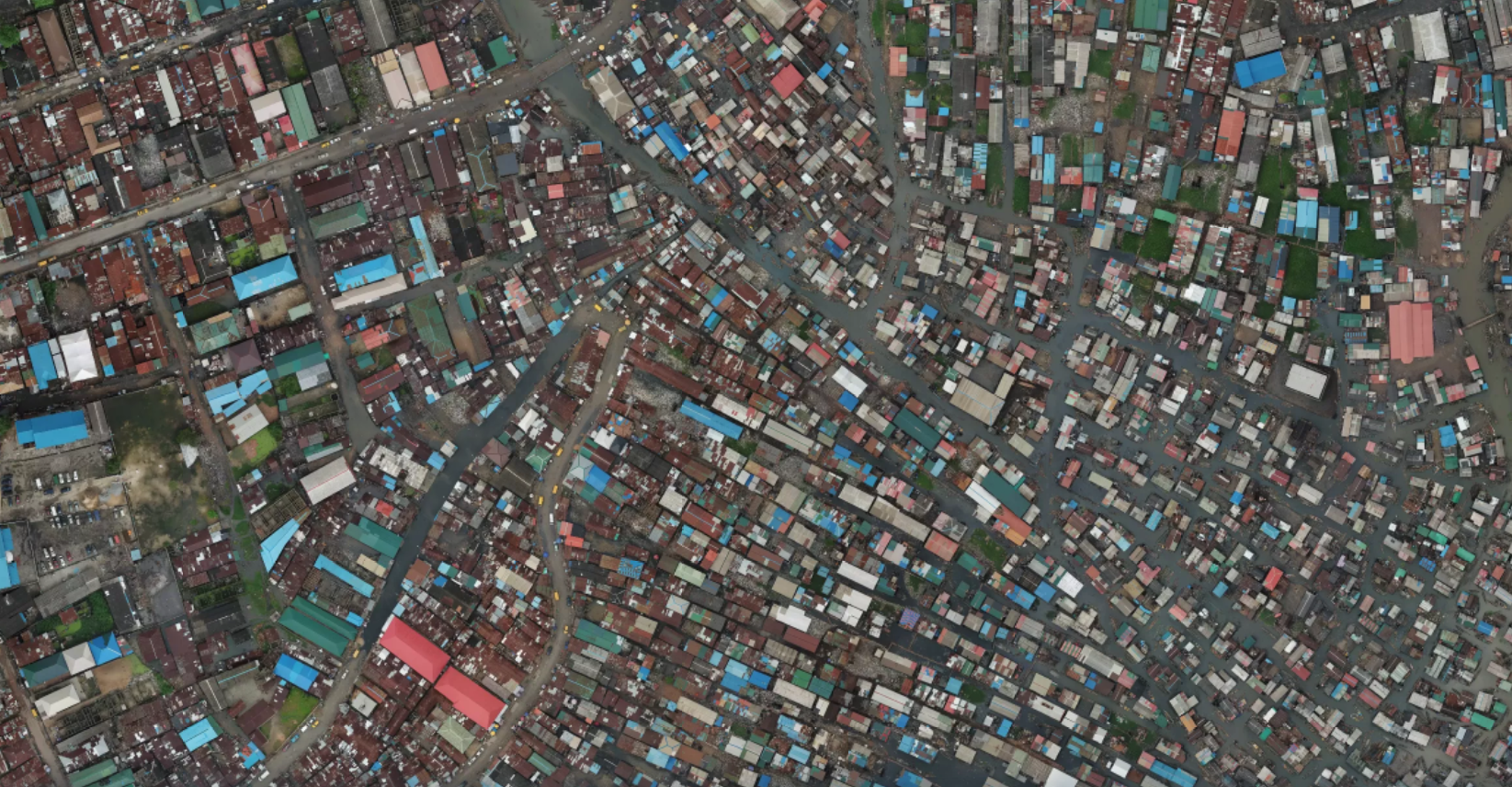
Aerial view of Makoko in Lagos

Squatting in Nigeria refers to a person who is not the owner, taking possession of land or an empty house. Squatters migrate from the countryside to informal settlements in cities such as Abuja, Port Harcourt and in particular Lagos. Lagos had a population of over 14 million people in 2019 and many slums, including Makoko.

== Overview ==
Squatting in Nigeria occurs when people migrate from the countryside to cities such as Abuja, Port Harcourt and in particular Lagos. Other reasons include the lack of low cost housing, unemployment and inability to access loans. Barriers to the construction of low cost housing are corruption, lack of national policy initiatives and bad governance. As a result of the COVID-19 pandemic in Nigeria, homelessness in cities was observed to be increasing in 2020.

In the late 1960s and early 1970s, there was less squatting in West Africa than in other areas of Africa and also Latin America, because cheaply rented property was available and traditional tribal structures meant it was easy to find housing. However, the population in urban areas was rising rapidly: Ajegunle, now part of Lagos, went from a population of 12,951 in 1948–1952, to an estimated 120,000 in 1970–1972; Aba went from 57,787 in 1948–1952 to an estimated 300,000 in 1970–1972; Abeokuta went from 84,451 people in 1948–1952 to an estimated 250,000 in 1970–1972; Kakuri now part of Kaduna had 1,000 inhabitants in 1948–1952 and an estimated 30,000 people in 1970–1972. In November 2020, Lagos State issued over 2,500 eviction notices to informal settlements in Fagba a district of Ifako-Ijaiye, stating that the squatters were hoodlums who had been involved in the EndSARS protests.

== Lagos ==
The capital Lagos is the most populated city in Africa, with over 14 million people in 2019 (Nigeria as a whole had over 200 million people). In 1995, almost 70% of the population of Lagos lived in slums. Makoko is an area composed of six villages, four on water and two on land. The villages on water are made up of wooden shacks built beside the Third Mainland Bridge. There are no official figures and population estimates range from 40,000 up to 300,000 people. An eviction attempt in 2012 by the State Ministry of Waterfront Infrastructure Development stopped when a resident was shot dead. Badia East is a slum beside the railway which has seen large-scale evictions in 1986, 1997, 2003 and 2013.
