= Rog (factory) =

Evicted squat in Slovenia

- Avtonomna tovarna Rog
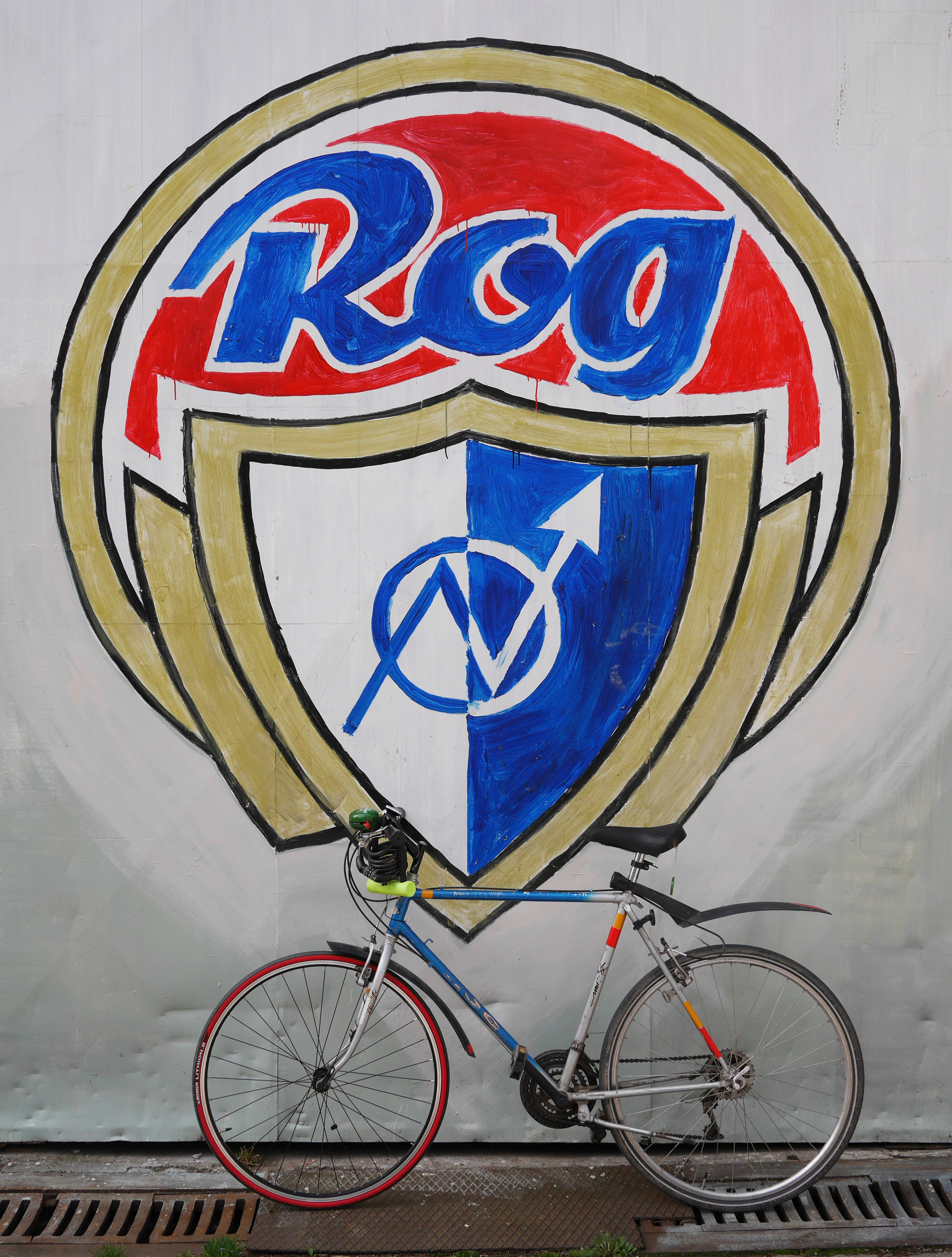
- Rog logo
- Interactive map of Rog

General information
- Coordinates: 46.0514°N 14.5151°E
- Owner: City of Ljubljana

Website
- tovarna.org

Rog Autonomous Factory (Slovenian: Avtonomna tovarna Rog), known as Rog, was a squatted bicycle factory in Ljubljana. It was used as a cultural centre and self-managed social centre from 2006 until 2021. The complex housed a music venue, a skate park, a medical clinic for asylum seekers, a football pitch, and artists' ateliers. After years of debate over its future, the centre was evicted by the city council in January 2021.

== History ==
In 1871, Johann-Josef Janesch (1818–1882) bought the triangle of land in Ljubljana now bordered by Trubar Street (Trubarjeva cesta), Petkovšek Embankment (Petkovškovo nabrežje), and Rozman Street (Rozmanova ulica) and set up a tannery. Carl Pollak (1853–1937) purchased the land in 1900 and enclosed it, building a villa. The Rog bicycle manufacturers built the factory in 1951 and used it until 1991, when the site became derelict. It was designated a monument of national heritage in 1998 and bought by the city council in 2002, but it remained empty apart from occasionally being used for events.

== Occupation ==
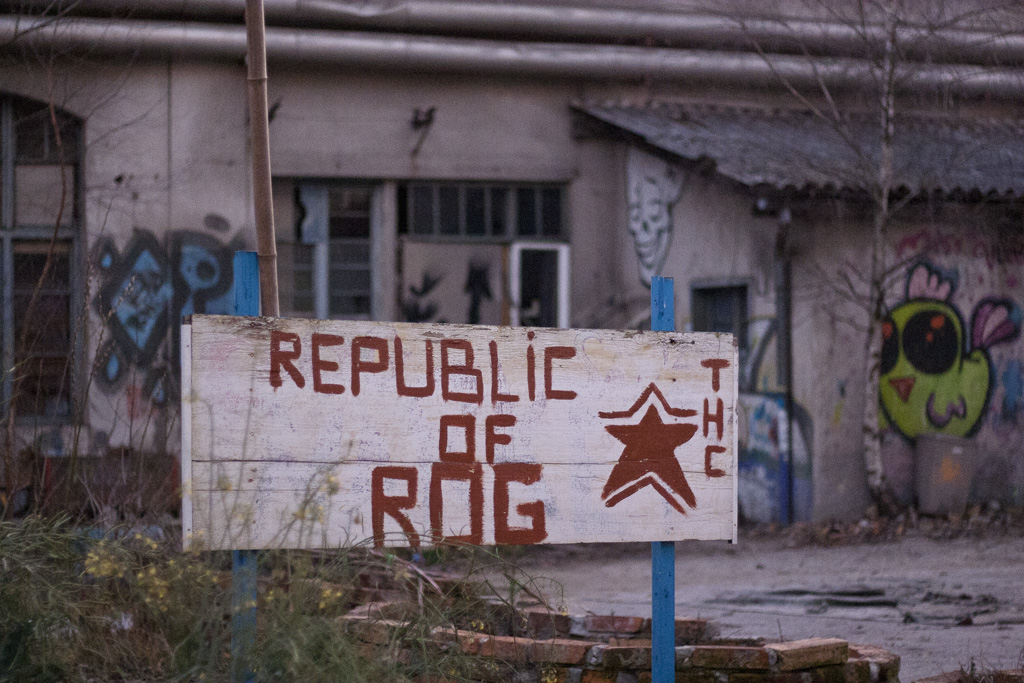
"Republic of Rog"

The factory complex was squatted in 2006 and kept the name Rog. The occupiers declared "As a non-formal network of individuals we believe that our actions are completely legitimate and well-grounded, although, at the moment, lacking official permission". The centre was run by assembly and hosted different activities, functioning as both a cultural centre for art and a self-managed social centre. It hosted concerts, lectures, refugee support activities and other events.

The centre was used by many groups, such as Antifašistična fronta (Antifascist Front), Nevidni delavci sveta (Invisible Workers of the World), and the Anarcho-Queer-Feminist collective. There was also a medical clinic for asylum seekers. Volunteers built the largest skate park in the Balkans in a previously derelict hall. Another hall housed the concert venue and there were also the "Blue corner", a football pitch, a circus space, artist ateliers, galleries and a graffiti workshop.

== Conflict with city council ==
Mayor Zoran Janković threatened to evict the squat in 2010, but the support of the local community and organizations dissuaded him. In 2010, the city of Ljubljana participated in the Central European project A Second Chance: From Industrial Use to Creative Impulse, joining the cities of Nuremberg (former AEG factory), Leipzig (HALLE 14 of the former Cotton Spinning Mill), Venice (the Arsenale), and Kraków (a tram depot). The project aimed to upgrade former industrial sites into cultural hubs, and to make Rog into the Rog Centre for Contemporary Arts.

In 2016, the squat celebrated its ten-year anniversary with concerts, exhibitions and debates. In June, the city council unsuccessfully attempted to evict the centre, bringing a digger to start demolition in the middle of the night. The city council was later sued by the centre. A demolition permit had been signed in 2011 and extended in 2014, and was due to run out with no possibility to extend it again. The Rog collective then presented its own vision of how to develop the factory complex.

== Eviction and demolition ==
Rog was evicted in January 2021 by the city council, which claimed it was empty and abandoned at the time. The centre argued that the people ordered to leave the site following a court case had indeed left but other people were still using the space since in total there were between 100 and 200 participants, tolerated by verbal agreement with the council. The centre was given thirty days to appeal the judgement. Twelve people were arrested as they tried to stop city workers beginning the demolition of the site and eight were later charged with various offences. Afterwards a man was charged with burning down a tree at Prešeren Square.

The city of Ljubljana then proceeded with plans to set up a cultural centre called the Rog Centre in the former factory lot, funneling an additional budget of 1.85 million euros towards the project. In June 2021, the Marco 5 construction company won a contract over 14.2 million euros for the construction of the project. Construction of the new Rog Center was finished in October 2023, housing various manufacturing workshops, lecture halls, a library, and residential areas on four floors totalling 8,500 km^{2} (850,000 ha; 2,100,000 acres), and it was renamed the Institute of Science, Technology, Engineering, Arts, Development (INSTEAD) (Inštitut za znanost, tehnologijo, inženirstvo, umetnost in razvoj (IZTIUR) in Slovene). Squatters that had occupied Rog for many years sought out other sites around Ljubljana and occupied the former canteen of the bankrupt Ljubljana Road Company, forming a new squatter zone known as the Participatory Ljubljana Autonomous Zone (PLAC).

== See also ==
- Squatting in Slovenia
- Metelkova
- Temporary use
