= April 19 =

Events on calendar date 19 April

April 19 this year in various calendars
- Sunday, 19 April 2026
Akan	Nkyikwasi
Armenian	3 Mareri 1475
Aztec	Tlaxochimaco 19, 9 Mazātl
Babylonian	1 Nisanu, 2337 SE
Balinese pawukon	Menga, Kajeng, Jaya, Umanis, Urukung, Redite of Ukir, Kala, Gigis, Pandita
Bengali	6 Boisakh, BS 1433
Chinese	Yin Water Pig・Hairy Head Mansion; Fire Horse Year, Month 3, Day 3 (Qingming, 1 day until Guyu)
Common Era	19 April 2026 CE
Coptic	11 Parmouti, AM 1742
Egyptian	3 Thoth, 2775 NE
Ethiopian	11 Miyāzyā, 2018 Amätä Məhrät
French Republican	Décade III, Décadi de Germinal de l'Année 234 de la République
Gregorian	19 April, AD 2026
Hebrew	2 Iyar, AM 5786; Omer 17
Hindu	Bharaṇī・Prīti; Solar: 6 Vaiśākha, 1948 SE; Lunisolar: Dvitīyā, Śukla pakṣa of Vaiśākha, 2083 VE; Rāudra・5127 KY・1,872,684
Icelandic	Sunnudagur, 27 Einmánuður 2025
Islamic	2 Dhu al-Qi'dah, AH 1447 (using tabular method)
ISO week date	2026-W16-7
Japanese	3 Yayoi, Reiwa 8 (Seimei, 1 day until Kokuu)
Julian	6 April, AD 2026 (AM 7534)
Julian day	2461150
Korean	3 Yongdal, 4359 DE
Maya	13.0.13.9.7; 0 Uo, 9 Manik
Roman	ante diem VIII Idus Apriles, MMDCCLXXIX AUC
Solar Hijri	30 Farvardin, SH 1405
Tibetan	2 nag pa, me pho rta 2153 or 1772 or 1000

<<	April					>>
Su	Mo	Tu	We	Th	Fr	Sa
			1	2	3	4
5	6	7	8	9	10	11
12	13	14	15	16	17	18
19	20	21	22	23	24	25
26	27	28	29	30
2026

April 19 in recent years
2026 (Sunday)
2025 (Saturday)
2024 (Friday)
2023 (Wednesday)
2022 (Tuesday)
2021 (Monday)
2020 (Sunday)
2019 (Friday)
2018 (Thursday)
2017 (Wednesday)

April 19 is the 109th day of the year (110th in leap years) in the Gregorian calendar; 256 days remain until the end of the year.

== Events ==
=== Pre-1600 ===
- AD 65 – The freedman Milichus betrays Piso's plot to kill the Emperor Nero and all of the conspirators are arrested.
- 531 – Battle of Callinicum: A Byzantine army under Belisarius is defeated by the Persians at Raqqa (northern Syria).
- 1024 – Election of Pope John XIX following the death of his brother Pope Benedict VIII.
- 1042 – Following the attempt of Byzantine Emperor Michael V Kalaphates to depose his wife and empress Zoe Porphyrogenita, a popular uprising in Constantinople breaks out with the intention to restore her.
- 1506 – The Lisbon Massacre begins, in which about two thousand Jews who had been forcibly converted to Christianity are slaughtered by Portuguese Catholics.
- 1529 – Beginning of the Protestant Reformation: After the Second Diet of Speyer bans Lutheranism, a group of rulers (German: Fürst) and independent cities protest the reinstatement of the Edict of Worms.
- 1539 – The Treaty of Frankfurt between Protestants and the Holy Roman Emperor is signed.
- 1572 – England and France sign an alliance against Spain in the treaty of Blois.

=== 1601–1900 ===
- 1608 – In Ireland, O'Doherty's Rebellion is launched by the Burning of Derry.
- 1677 – The French army captures the town of Cambrai held by Spanish troops.
- 1713 – With no living male heirs, Charles VI, Holy Roman Emperor, issues the Pragmatic Sanction of 1713 to ensure that Habsburg lands and the Austrian throne would be inheritable by a female; his daughter and successor, Maria Theresa, was not born until 1717.
- 1770 – Captain James Cook, still holding the rank of lieutenant, sights the eastern coast of what is now Australia.
- 1770 – Marie Antoinette marries Louis XVI in a proxy wedding.
- 1775 – American Revolutionary War: The war begins during the Battles of Lexington and Concord with a victory of American minutemen and other militia over British forces, later referred to as the "shot heard round the world".
- 1775 – American Revolutionary War: Following the Battles of Lexington and Concord, the Siege of Boston begins with American militias blocking land access to the British-held city.
- 1782 – John Adams secures Dutch recognition of the United States as an independent government. The house which he had purchased in The Hague becomes the first American embassy.
- 1809 – An Austrian corps is defeated by the forces of the Duchy of Warsaw in the Battle of Raszyn, part of the struggles of the Fifth Coalition. On the same day the Austrian main army is defeated by a First French Empire Corps led by Louis-Nicolas Davout at the Battle of Teugen-Hausen in Bavaria, part of a four-day campaign that ended in a French victory.
- 1810 – Venezuela achieves home rule: Vicente Emparán, Governor of the Captaincy General is removed by the people of Caracas and a junta is installed.
- 1818 – French physicist Augustin Fresnel signs his preliminary "Note on the Theory of Diffraction" (deposited on the following day). The document ends with what we now call the Fresnel integrals.
- 1839 – The Treaty of London establishes Belgium as a kingdom and guarantees its neutrality.
- 1861 – American Civil War: Baltimore riot of 1861: A pro-Secession mob in Baltimore attacks United States Army troops marching through the city.

=== 1901–present ===
- 1903 – The Kishinev pogrom in Kishinev (Bessarabia) begins, forcing tens of thousands of Jews to later seek refuge in Palestine and the Western world.
- 1925 – Colo-Colo, the most successful and popular soccer football team in the South American nation of Chile, was founded at the El Llano Stadium in San Miguel, Santiago, by footballer David Arellano and some of his teammates who had also left the Deportes Magallanes club.
- 1927 – Mae West is sentenced to ten days in jail for obscenity for her play Sex.
- 1936 – The Jaffa riots commence, initiating the 1936–1939 Arab revolt in Palestine.
- 1942 – World War II: In German-occupied Poland, the Majdan-Tatarski ghetto is established, situated between the Lublin Ghetto and a Majdanek subcamp.
- 1943 – World War II: In German-occupied Poland, the Warsaw Ghetto Uprising begins, after German troops enter the Warsaw Ghetto to round up the remaining Jews.
- 1956 – Actress Grace Kelly marries Prince Rainier of Monaco.
- 1960 – Students in South Korea hold a nationwide pro-democracy protest against president Syngman Rhee, eventually forcing him to resign.
- 1971 – Sierra Leone becomes a republic, and Siaka Stevens the president.
- 1971 – Launch of Salyut 1, the first space station.
- 1971 – Charles Manson is sentenced to death (later commuted to life imprisonment) for conspiracy in the Tate–LaBianca murders.
- 1973 – The Portuguese Socialist Party is founded in the German town of Bad Münstereifel.
- 1975 – India's first satellite Aryabhata launched in orbit from Kapustin Yar, Russia.
- 1975 – South Vietnamese forces withdraw from the town of Xuan Loc in the last major battle of the Vietnam War.
- 1976 – A violent F5 tornado strikes around Brownwood, Texas, injuring 11 people. Two people were thrown at least 1,000 yards (910 m) by the tornado and survived uninjured.
- 1985 – Two hundred ATF and FBI agents lay siege to the compound of the white supremacist survivalist group The Covenant, the Sword, and the Arm of the Lord in Arkansas; the CSA surrenders two days later.
- 1989 – A gun turret explodes on the USS Iowa, killing 47 sailors.
- 1993 – The 51-day FBI siege of the Branch Davidian building in Waco, Texas, US, ends when a fire breaks out. Seventy-six Davidians, including 18 children under age 10, died in the fire.
- 1995 – Oklahoma City bombing: The Alfred P. Murrah Federal Building in Oklahoma City, US, is bombed, killing 168 people including 19 children under the age of six.
- 1999 – The German Bundestag returns to Berlin.
- 2000 – Air Philippines Flight 541 crashes in Samal, Davao del Norte, killing all 131 people on board.
- 2001 – Space Shuttle Endeavour is launched on STS-100 carrying the Canadarm2 to the International Space Station.
- 2005 – Cardinal Joseph Ratzinger is elected to the papacy and becomes Pope Benedict XVI.
- 2008 – The Quito Ultratumba nightclub fire in Quito, Ecuador, kills 19 people and injures at least 24 more.
- 2011 – Fidel Castro resigns as First Secretary of the Communist Party of Cuba after holding the title since July 1961.
- 2013 – Boston Marathon bombing suspect Tamerlan Tsarnaev is killed in a shootout with police. His brother Dzhokhar is later captured hiding in a boat inside a backyard in the suburb of Watertown.
- 2020 – A killing spree in Nova Scotia, Canada, leaves 22 people and the perpetrator dead, making it the deadliest rampage in the country's history.
- 2021 – The Ingenuity helicopter becomes the first aircraft to achieve flight on another planet.

== Births ==
=== Pre-1600 ===
- 1452 – Frederick IV, King of Naples (died 1504)
- 1593 – Sir John Hobart, 2nd Baronet, English politician (died 1647)

=== 1601–1900 ===
- 1603 – Michel Le Tellier, French politician, French Minister of Defence (died 1685)
- 1613 – Christoph Bach, German musician (died 1661)
- 1633 – Willem Drost, Dutch painter (died 1659)
- 1655 – George St Lo(e), Royal Navy officer and administrator (died 1718)
- 1658 – Johann Wilhelm, Elector Palatine, German husband of Archduchess Maria Anna Josepha of Austria (died 1716)
- 1665 – Jacques Lelong, French author (died 1721)
- 1686 – Vasily Tatishchev, Russian ethnographer and politician (died 1750)
- 1715 – James Nares, English organist and composer (died 1783)
- 1721 – Roger Sherman, American lawyer and politician (died 1793)
- 1734 – Karl von Ordóñez, Austrian violinist and composer (died 1786)
- 1757 – Edward Pellew, 1st Viscount Exmouth, English admiral and politician (died 1833)
- 1758 – William Carnegie, 7th Earl of Northesk, Scottish admiral (died 1831)
- 1785 – Alexandre Pierre François Boëly, French pianist and composer (died 1858)
- 1787 – Deaf Smith, American soldier (died 1837)
- 1793 – Ferdinand I of Austria (died 1875)
- 1806 – Sarah Bagley, American labor organizer (died 1889)
- 1814 – Louis Amédée Achard, French journalist and author (died 1875)
- 1831 – Mary Louise Booth, American writer, editor and translator (died 1889)
- 1832 – José Echegaray, Spanish poet and playwright, Nobel Prize laureate (died 1916)
- 1835 – Julius Krohn, Finnish poet and journalist (died 1888)
- 1861 – Amalie Andersen, Norwegian actress (died 1924)
- 1863 – Hemmo Kallio, Finnish actor (died 1940)
- 1872 – Alice Salomon, German social reformer (died 1948)
- 1873 – Sydney Barnes, English cricketer (died 1967)
- 1874 – Ernst Rüdin, Swiss psychiatrist, geneticist, and eugenicist (died 1952)
- 1877 – Ole Evinrude, Norwegian-American engineer, invented the outboard motor (died 1934)
- 1879 – Arthur Robertson, Scottish runner (died 1957)
- 1882 – Getúlio Vargas, Brazilian lawyer and politician, 14th President of Brazil (died 1954)
- 1883 – Henry Jameson, American soccer player (died 1938)
- 1883 – Richard von Mises, Austrian-American mathematician and physicist (died 1953)
- 1885 – Karl Tarvas, Estonian architect (died 1975)
- 1889 – Otto Georg Thierack, German jurist and politician (died 1946)
- 1891 – Françoise Rosay, French actress (died 1974)
- 1892 – Germaine Tailleferre, French composer and educator (died 1983)
- 1894 – Elizabeth Dilling, American author and activist (died 1966)
- 1897 – Peter de Noronha, Indian businessman and philanthropist (died 1970)
- 1897 – Jiroemon Kimura, Japanese super-centenarian, oldest verified man ever (died 2013)
- 1898 – Constance Talmadge, American actress and producer (died 1973)
- 1899 – George O'Brien, American actor (died 1985)
- 1899 – Cemal Tollu, Turkish lieutenant and painter (died 1968)
- 1900 – Iracema de Alencar, Brazilian film actress (died 1978)
- 1900 – Richard Hughes, English author, poet, and playwright (died 1976)
- 1900 – Roland Michener, Canadian lawyer and politician, 20th Governor General of Canada (died 1991)
- 1900 – Rhea Silberta, American Yiddish songwriter and singing teacher (died 1959)

=== 1901–present ===
- 1902 – Veniamin Kaverin, Russian author and screenwriter (died 1989)
- 1903 – Eliot Ness, American law enforcement agent (died 1957)
- 1908 – Irena Eichlerówna, Polish actress (died 1990)
- 1912 – Glenn T. Seaborg, American chemist and academic, Nobel Prize laureate (died 1999)
- 1913 – Ken Carpenter, American discus thrower and coach (died 1984)
- 1917 – Sven Hassel, Danish-German soldier and author (died 2012)
- 1920 – Marvin Mandel, American lawyer and politician, 56th Governor of Maryland (died 2015)
- 1920 – Julien Ries, Belgian cardinal (died 2013)
- 1920 – Ragnar Ulstein, Norwegian journalist and war historian (died 2019)
- 1921 – Anna Lee Aldred, American jockey (died 2006)
- 1921 – Leon Henkin, American logician (died 2006)
- 1921 – Roberto Tucci, Italian Jesuit leader, cardinal, and theologian (died 2015)
- 1922 – Erich Hartmann, German colonel and pilot (died 1993)
- 1925 – Hugh O'Brian, American actor (died 2016)
- 1927 – Cora Sue Collins, American child actress (died 2025)
- 1928 – John Horlock, English engineer and academic (died 2015)
- 1928 – Azlan Shah of Perak, Yang di-Pertuan Agong of Malaysia (died 2014)
- 1928 – Richard Garwin, American physicist (died 2025)
- 1928 – Alexis Korner, British blues musician and radio broadcaster (died 1984)
- 1931 – Walter Stewart, Canadian journalist and author (died 2004)
- 1932 – Fernando Botero, Colombian painter and sculptor (died 2023)
- 1933 – Dickie Bird, English cricketer and umpire (died 2025)
- 1933 – Jayne Mansfield, American model and actress (died 1967)
- 1935 – Dudley Moore, English actor, comedian, and pianist (died 2002)
- 1936 – Wilfried Martens, Belgian politician, 60th Prime Minister of Belgium (died 2013)
- 1937 – Antonio Carluccio, Italian-English chef and author (died 2017)
- 1937 – Joseph Estrada, Filipino politician, 13th President of the Philippines
- 1939 – Clay Shaw, American accountant, judge, and politician (died 2013)
- 1939 – Ali Khamenei, Supreme Leader of Iran (died 2026)
- 1941 – Michel Roux, French-English chef and author (died 2020)
- 1943 – Margo MacDonald, Scottish journalist and politician (died 2014)
- 1944 – James Heckman, American economist and academic, Nobel Prize laureate
- 1944 – Bernie Worrell, American keyboard player and songwriter (died 2016)
- 1946 – Tim Curry, English actor and singer (died 2026)
- 1951 – Jóannes Eidesgaard, Faroese educator and politician, Prime Minister of the Faroe Islands
- 1952 – Simon Cowell, English conservationist and author (died 2024)
- 1954 – Trevor Francis, English footballer and manager (died 2023)
- 1956 – Anne Glover, Scottish biologist and academic
- 1957 – Mukesh Ambani, Indian businessman, chairman of Reliance Industries
- 1960 – Gustavo Petro, Colombian politician, 34th and current President of Colombia
- 1960 – Frank Viola, American baseball player and coach
- 1965 – Suge Knight, American record executive
- 1966 – Véronique Gens, French soprano and actress
- 1966 – Paul Reiffel, Australian cricketer and umpire
- 1968 – Ashley Judd, American actress
- 1968 – Mswati III, King (Ngwenyama) of Eswatini (Swaziland)
- 1970 – Kelly Holmes, English athlete and double Olympic champion
- 1972 – Rivaldo Vitor Borba Ferreira, Brazilian footballer
- 1974 – Madeleine Peyroux, American French jazz and blues singer-songwriter
- 1975 – Jason Gillespie, Australian cricketer and coach
- 1976 – Michelle Feldman, American bowler
- 1978 – James Franco, American actor, director, producer, and screenwriter
- 1978 – Amanda Sage, American-Austrian painter and educator
- 1979 – Kate Hudson, American actress
- 1981 – Hayden Christensen, Canadian actor
- 1981 – Lise Klaveness, Norwegian footballer and lawyer, president of the Norwegian Football Federation
- 1981 – Troy Polamalu, American football player
- 1982 – Samuel C. Morrison, Jr., Liberian-American journalist, producer, and screenwriter
- 1982 – Ali Wong, American comedian and actress
- 1983 – Joe Mauer, American baseball player
- 1986 – Candace Parker, American basketball player
- 1987 – Joe Hart, English footballer
- 1987 – Maria Sharapova, Russian tennis player
- 1989 – Simu Liu, Canadian actor
- 1990 – Jackie Bradley Jr., American baseball player
- 1990 – Kim Chiu, Filipino actress, singer, and dancer
- 1991 – Kelly Olynyk, Canadian basketball player
- 1999 – Sebastian Kris, Australian-NewZealand rugby league player
- 2001 – Dalton Knecht, American basketball player
- 2001 – PinkPantheress, British singer-songwriter and record producer
- 2002 – Loren Gray, American singer and internet personality
- 2003 – Jackson Merrill, American baseball player
- 2007 – Ben Kindel, Canadian ice hockey player
- 2016 – The Rizzler, American internet personality

== Deaths ==
=== Pre-1600 ===
- 843 – Judith of Bavaria, Frankish empress
- 1012 – Ælfheah of Canterbury, English archbishop and saint (born 954)
- 1013 – Hisham II, Umayyad caliph of Córdoba (born 966)
- 1044 – Gothelo I, duke of Lorraine
- 1054 – Leo IX, pope of the Catholic Church (born 1002)
- 1321 – Gerasimus I, patriarch of Constantinople
- 1390 – Robert II, king of Scotland (born 1316)
- 1405 – Thomas West, 1st Baron West, English nobleman (born 1335)
- 1431 – Adolph III, count of Waldeck (born 1362)
- 1560 – Philip Melanchthon, German theologian and reformer (born 1497)
- 1567 – Michael Stifel, German monk and mathematician (born 1487)
- 1578 – Uesugi Kenshin, Japanese samurai and warlord (born 1530)
- 1588 – Paolo Veronese, Italian painter (born 1528)

=== 1601–1900 ===
- 1608 – Thomas Sackville, 1st Earl of Dorset, English poet, playwright, and politician, Lord High Treasurer (born 1536)
- 1618 – Thomas Bastard, English priest and author (born 1566)
- 1619 – Jagat Gosain, Mughal empress (born 1573)
- 1629 – Sigismondo d'India, Italian composer (born 1582)
- 1686 – Antonio de Solís y Ribadeneyra, Spanish historian and playwright (born 1610)
- 1689 – Christina, queen of Sweden (born 1626)
- 1733 – Elizabeth Hamilton, countess of Orkney (born 1657)
- 1739 – Nicholas Saunderson, English mathematician and academic (born 1682)
- 1768 – Canaletto, Italian painter and etcher (born 1697)
- 1776 – Jacob Emden, German rabbi and author (born 1697)
- 1791 – Richard Price, Welsh-English preacher and philosopher (born 1723)
- 1813 – Benjamin Rush, American physician and educator (born 1745)
- 1824 – Lord Byron, English-Scottish poet and playwright (born 1788)
- 1831 – Johann Gottlieb Friedrich von Bohnenberger, German astronomer and mathematician (born 1765)
- 1833 – James Gambier, 1st Baron Gambier, Bahamian-English admiral and politician, 36th Commodore Governor of Newfoundland (born 1756)
- 1840 – Jean-Jacques Lartigue, Canadian bishop (born 1777)
- 1854 – Robert Jameson, Scottish mineralogist and academic (born 1774)
- 1881 – Benjamin Disraeli, English journalist and politician, Prime Minister of the United Kingdom (born 1804)
- 1882 – Charles Darwin, English biologist and theorist (born 1809)
- 1893 – Martin Körber, Estonian-German pastor, composer, and conductor (born 1817)

=== 1901–present ===
- 1901 – Alfred Horatio Belo, American publisher, founded The Dallas Morning News (born 1839)
- 1903 – Oliver Mowat, Canadian politician, third Premier of Ontario, eighth Lieutenant Governor of Ontario (born 1820)
- 1906 – Pierre Curie, French physicist and academic, Nobel Prize laureate (born 1859)
- 1906 – Spencer Gore, English tennis player and cricketer (born 1850)
- 1909 – Signe Rink, Greenland-born Danish writer and ethnologist (born 1836)
- 1914 – Charles Sanders Peirce, American mathematician and philosopher (born 1839)
- 1915 – Thomas Playford, English-Australian politician, 17th Premier of South Australia (born 1837)
- 1916 – Ephraim Shay, American engineer, designed the Shay locomotive (born 1839)
- 1926 – Alexander Alexandrovich Chuprov, Russian-Swiss statistician and theorist (born 1874)
- 1930 – Georges-Casimir Dessaulles, Canadian businessman and politician (born 1827)
- 1937 – Martin Conway, 1st Baron Conway of Allington, English cartographer and politician (born 1856)
- 1937 – William Morton Wheeler, American entomologist and zoologist (born 1865)
- 1940 – Jack McNeela, Irish Republican Army, died on hunger strike
- 1941 – Johanna Müller-Hermann, Austrian composer (born 1878)
- 1949 – Ulrich Salchow, Danish-Swedish figure skater (born 1877)
- 1950 – Ernst Robert Curtius, French-German philologist and scholar (born 1886)
- 1952 – Steve Conway, British singer (born 1921)
- 1955 – Jim Corbett, British-Indian colonel, hunter, and author (born 1875)
- 1960 – Beardsley Ruml, American economist and statistician (born 1894)
- 1961 – Max Hainle, German swimmer (born 1882)
- 1966 – Väinö Tanner, Finnish politician of Social Democratic Party of Finland; the Prime Minister of Finland (born 1881)
- 1967 – Konrad Adenauer, German politician, 1st Chancellor of Germany (born 1876)
- 1971 – Luigi Piotti, Italian race car driver (born 1913)
- 1975 – Percy Lavon Julian, American chemist and academic (born 1899)
- 1988 – Kwon Ki-ok, Korean pilot (born 1901)
- 1989 – Daphne du Maurier, English novelist and playwright (born 1907)
- 1991 – Stanley Hawes, English-Australian director and producer (born 1905)
- 1992 – Frankie Howerd, English actor and screenwriter (born 1917)
- 1993 – David Koresh, American cult leader (born 1959)
- 1993 – George S. Mickelson, American captain, lawyer, and politician, 28th Governor of South Dakota (born 1941)
- 1998 – Octavio Paz, Mexican poet, philosopher, and academic Nobel Prize laureate (born 1914)
- 1999 – Hermine Braunsteiner, Austrian-German SS officer (born 1919)
- 2000 – Louis Applebaum, Canadian composer and conductor (born 1918)
- 2002 – Reginald Rose, American writer (born 1920)
- 2004 – Norris McWhirter, English author and activist co-founded the Guinness World Records (born 1925)
- 2004 – John Maynard Smith, English biologist and geneticist (born 1920)
- 2004 – Jenny Pike, Canadian WWII servicewoman and photographer (born 1922)
- 2006 – Albert Scott Crossfield, American engineer, pilot, and astronaut (born 1921)
- 2007 – Jean-Pierre Cassel, French actor (born 1932)
- 2009 – J. G. Ballard, English novelist, short story writer, and essayist (born 1930)
- 2011 – Elisabeth Sladen, English actress (born 1946)
- 2012 – Levon Helm, American musician and actor (born 1940)
- 2013 – François Jacob, French biologist and academic, Nobel Prize laureate (born 1920)
- 2013 – Al Neuharth, American journalist, author, and publisher, founded USA Today (born 1924)
- 2015 – Raymond Carr, English historian and academic (born 1919)
- 2015 – Roy Mason, English miner and politician, Secretary of State for Defence (born 1924)
- 2016 – Patricio Aylwin, Chilean politician (born 1918)
- 2017 – Lu Chao-Hsuan, Taiwanese guitarist, performer and educator. (born 1929)
- 2020 – Ian Whitcomb, English singer-songwriter (born 1941)
- 2021 – Walter Mondale, American politician, 42nd Vice President of the United States (born 1928)
- 2021 – Jim Steinman, American composer, lyricist (born 1947)
- 2022 – Kane Tanaka, Japanese supercentenarian (born 1903)
- 2023 – Moonbin, South Korean singer and actor (born 1998)
- 2023 – Ron Hamilton, American musician (born 1950)
- 2024 – Daniel Dennett, American philosopher and author (born 1942)
- 2026 – George Ariyoshi, American lawyer and politician, 3rd Governor of Hawaii (born 1926)

== Holidays and observances ==
- Christian feast day:
  - Ælfheah of Canterbury (Anglican, Catholic, Orthodox)
  - Conrad of Ascoli
  - Emma of Lesum
  - Expeditus
  - George of Antioch
  - Olaus and Laurentius Petri (Lutheran)
  - Pope Leo IX
  - Ursmar
  - April 19 (Eastern Orthodox liturgics)
