= November 6 =

November 6 this year in various calendars
- Friday, 6 November 2026
Akan	Monofie
Armenian	19 Trē 1476
Aztec	Atlcahualo 15, 2 Tōchtli
Babylonian	24 Tashritu, 2337 SE
Balinese pawukon	Luang, Pepet, Kajeng, Laba, Paing, Maulu, Sukra of Sinta, Brahma, Gigis, Manuh
Bengali	21 Kartik, BS 1433
Chinese	Yang Wood Monkey・Ghost Mansion; Fire Horse Year, Month 9, Day 28 (Shuangjiang, 1 day until Lidong)
Common Era	6 November 2026 CE
Coptic	27 Paopi, AM 1743
Egyptian	24 Phamenoth, 2775 NE
Ethiopian	27 Ṭeqemt, 2019 Amätä Məhrät
French Republican	Décade II, Quintidi de Brumaire de l'Année 235 de la République
Gregorian	6 November, AD 2026
Hebrew	26 Cheshvan, AM 5787
Hindu	Hasta・Vaidhṛti; Solar: 20 Kārtika, 1948 SE; Lunisolar: Dvādaśī, Kṛishna pakṣa of Āśvina, 2083 VE; Rāudra・5127 KY・1,872,885
Icelandic	Föstudagur, 14 Gormánuður 2026
Islamic	25 Jumada al-awwal, AH 1448 (using tabular method)
ISO week date	2026-W45-5
Japanese	27 Nagatsuki, Reiwa 8 (Sōkō, 1 day until Rittō)
Julian	24 October, AD 2026 (AM 7535)
Julian day	2461351
Korean	27 Gaedal, 4359 DE
Maya	13.0.14.1.8; 1 Ceh, 2 Lamat
Roman	ante diem IX Kalendas Novembres, MMDCCLXXIX AUC
Solar Hijri	15 Aban, SH 1405
Tibetan	27 tha skar, me pho rta 2153 or 1772 or 1000

<<	November					>>
Su	Mo	Tu	We	Th	Fr	Sa
1	2	3	4	5	6	7
8	9	10	11	12	13	14
15	16	17	18	19	20	21
22	23	24	25	26	27	28
29	30
2026

November 6 in recent years
2026 (Friday)
2025 (Thursday)
2024 (Wednesday)
2023 (Monday)
2022 (Sunday)
2021 (Saturday)
2020 (Friday)
2019 (Wednesday)
2018 (Tuesday)
2017 (Monday)

November 6 is the 310th day of the year (311th in leap years) in the Gregorian calendar; 55 days remain until the end of the year.

== Events ==
=== Pre-1600 ===
- 447 – A powerful earthquake destroys large portions of the Walls of Constantinople, including 57 towers.
- 644 – Caliph Umar is assassinated in Mecca.
- 963 – Synod of Rome: Emperor Otto I calls a council at St. Peter's Basilica in Rome. Pope John XII is deposed on charges of an armed rebellion against Otto.
- 1217 – The Charter of the Forest is sealed at St Paul's Cathedral, London by King Henry III, acting under the regency of William Marshall, 1st Earl of Pembroke which re-establishes for free men rights of access to the royal forest that had been eroded by William the Conqueror and his heirs.

=== 1601–1900 ===
- 1792 – Battle of Jemappes in the French Revolutionary Wars.
- 1860 – Abraham Lincoln is elected the 16th president of the United States with only 40% of the popular vote, defeating John C. Breckinridge, John Bell, and Stephen A. Douglas in a four-way race.
- 1869 – In New Brunswick, New Jersey, Rutgers College defeats Princeton University (then known as the College of New Jersey), 6–4, in the first official intercollegiate American football game.
- 1900 – President William McKinley is re-elected, along with his vice-presidential running mate, Governor Theodore Roosevelt of New York.

=== 1901–present ===
- 1936 – Spanish Civil War: The republican government flees from Madrid to Valencia, leading to the formation of the Madrid Defense Council in its stead.
- 1943 – World War II: The 1st Ukrainian Front liberates Kyiv from German occupation.
- 1947 – Meet the Press, the longest running television program in history, makes its debut on NBC Television.
- 1956 – Following pressure by US president Eisenhower, Great Britain announces a ceasefire in the Suez crisis, one day after it landed paratroopers together with France at key locations.
- 1963 – Nguyễn Ngọc Thơ is appointed to head the South Vietnamese government by General Dương Văn Minh's junta, five days after the latter deposed and assassinated President Ngô Đình Diệm.
- 1971 – The United States Atomic Energy Commission tests the largest U.S. underground hydrogen bomb, code-named Cannikin, on Amchitka Island in the Aleutians.
- 1976 – Uttawar forced sterilisations: Mass vasectomy of nearly 800 men of Uttawar village, Palwal district, Haryana during India's Emergency imposed by Indira Gandhi.
- 1977 – The Kelly Barnes Dam, located above Toccoa Falls College near Toccoa, Georgia, fails, killing 39.
- 1985 – Colombian conflict: leftist guerrillas of the 19th of April Movement seize control of the Palace of Justice in Bogotá.
- 1986 – Sumburgh disaster: A British International Helicopters Boeing 234LR Chinook crashes 2.5 miles (4.0 km) east of Sumburgh Airport killing 45 people. It is the deadliest civilian helicopter crash on record.
- 1988 – Lancang–Gengma earthquakes: At least 730 are killed after two powerful earthquakes rock the China–Myanmar border in Yunnan Province.
- 1995 – Cleveland Browns relocation controversy: Art Modell announces that he signed a deal that would relocate the Cleveland Browns to Baltimore.
- 2002 – Jiang Lijun is detained by Chinese police for signing the Open Letter to the 16th National Congress of the Chinese Communist Party.
- 2002 – A Fokker 50 crashes near Luxembourg Airport, killing 20 and injuring three.
- 2004 – An express train collides with a stationary car near the village of Ufton Nervet, England, killing seven and injuring 120.
- 2012 – Tammy Baldwin becomes the first openly gay politician to be elected to the United States Senate.
- 2016 – Syrian civil war: The Syrian Democratic Forces launch an offensive to capture the ISIL-held city of Raqqa.
- 2025 - Canadian ostrich cull: The Government of Canada kills 314 ostriches after H5N8 is detected in an ostrich farm in Edgewood, BC.

== Births ==
=== Pre-1600 ===
- 1391 – Edmund Mortimer, 5th Earl of March, English politician (died 1425)
- 1479 – Philip I, Margrave of Baden (died 1533)
- 1494 – Suleiman the Magnificent, Sultan of the Ottoman Empire (died 1566)
- 1550 – Karin Månsdotter, Swedish queen (died 1612)

=== 1601–1900 ===
- 1604 – George Ent, English scientist (died 1689)
- 1661 – Charles II of Spain, last Habsburg ruler of the Spanish Empire (died 1700)
- 1750 – Carlo Aurelio Widmann, Venetian nobleman and admiral (died 1798)
- 1755 – Zina Hitchcock, New York politician (died 1832)
- 1814 – Adolphe Sax, Belgian-French instrument designer, invented the saxophone (died 1894)
- 1832 – Joseph Smith III, American religious leader (died 1914)
- 1839 – Elvire Serrouin, French anarchist and protagonist of the Clichy affair (died ?)
- 1841 – Nelson W. Aldrich, American businessman and politician (died 1915)
- 1851 – Charles Dow, American journalist and economist (died 1902)
- 1854 – John Philip Sousa, American composer and bandleader (died 1932)
- 1861 – James Naismith, Canadian-American physician and educator, invented basketball (died 1939)
- 1880 – Yoshisuke Aikawa, Japanese businessman and politician, founded Nissan Motor Company (died 1967)
- 1884 – May Brahe, Australian composer (died 1956)
- 1885 – Martin O'Meara, Irish-Australian sergeant, Victoria Cross recipient (died 1935)
- 1887 – Walter Johnson, American baseball player and manager (died 1946)
- 1892 – Harold Ross, American magazine editor and co-founder of The New Yorker (died 1951)
- 1893 – Edsel Ford, American automobile executive (President of Ford Motor Company), son of Henry Ford (died 1943)
- 1897 – Jack O'Connor, English cricketer (died 1977)
- 1900 – Ida Lou Anderson, American orator and professor, pioneer in the field of radio broadcasting (died 1941)

=== 1901–present ===
- 1908 – Tony Canzoneri, American boxer (died 1959)
- 1913 – Cho Ki-chon, North Korean poet (died 1951)
- 1916 – Ray Conniff, American bandleader and musician (Ray Conniff Singers) (died 2002)
- 1921 – Geoff Rabone, New Zealand cricketer (died 2006)
- 1924 – Harry Threadgold, English footballer (died 1996)
- 1926 – Frank Carson, Northern Irish comedian and actor (died 2012)
- 1926 – Zig Ziglar, American soldier, businessman, and author (died 2012)
- 1929 – Lu Chao-Hsuan, Taiwanese guitarist, performer and educator. (died 2017)
- 1930 – Derrick Bell, American scholar, author and critical race theorist (died 2011)
- 1931 – Mike Nichols, German-born American actor, director, producer, and screenwriter (died 2014)
- 1932 – François Englert, Belgian physicist and academic, Nobel Prize laureate (died 2026)
- 1932 – Stonewall Jackson, American country music musician (died 2021)
- 1933 – Else Ackermann, German physician and pharmacologist (died 2019)
- 1937 – Leo Goeke, American tenor and actor (died 2012)
- 1938 – Mack Jones, American baseball player (died 2004)
- 1939 – Leonardo Quisumbing, Filipino lawyer and jurist (died 2019)
- 1939 – Michael Schwerner, American activist (died 1964)
- 1940 – Johnny Giles, Irish footballer and manager
- 1941 – Guy Clark, American singer-songwriter, guitarist, and producer (died 2016)
- 1941 – Doug Sahm, American singer-songwriter and musician (died 1999)
- 1946 – Sally Field, American actress
- 1946 – Fred Penner, Canadian children's entertainer
- 1946 – George Young, Scottish guitarist, songwriter, and producer (died 2017)
- 1948 – Glenn Frey, American singer-songwriter, guitarist, and actor (died 2016)
- 1949 – Elwood Edwards, American voice actor (died 2024)
- 1949 – Ariel Henry, Haitian prime-minister, neurosurgeon, and politician
- 1949 – Arturo Sandoval, Cuban-American jazz trumpeter and composer
- 1950 – Shaikh Rasheed Ahmad, Pakistani politician
- 1950 – Nimalan Soundaranayagam, Sri Lankan educator and politician (died 2000)
- 1952 – Michael Cunningham, American novelist and screenwriter
- 1953 – Frank Hanisch, German footballer
- 1953 – Brian McKechnie, New Zealand cricketer and rugby player
- 1955 – Mark Donaldson, New Zealand rugby player
- 1955 – Maria Shriver, American journalist and author
- 1956 – Graeme Wood, Australian cricketer and footballer
- 1960 – Lance Kerwin, American actor (died 2023)
- 1962 – Nadezhda Kuzhelnaya, Russian pilot and former cosmonaut
- 1963 – Rozz Williams, American singer, musician and artist (died 1998)
- 1964 – Mike Brewer, New Zealand rugby player
- 1966 – Paul Gilbert, American guitarist
- 1966 – Stephanie Vozzo, American professional comic book colorist and music agent
- 1967 – Shuzo Matsuoka, Japanese tennis player and sportscaster
- 1967 – Rebecca Schaeffer, American actress and model (died 1989)
- 1968 – Kelly Rutherford, American actress
- 1968 – Jerry Yang, Taiwanese-American engineer and businessman, co-founded Yahoo!
- 1969 – Colson Whitehead, American author, Pulitzer Prize winner in 2017 and 2020
- 1970 – Ethan Hawke, American actor and author
- 1971 – Laura Flessel-Colovic, French fencer and politician
- 1972 – Thandiwe Newton, English actress (Mission: Impossible 2; Westworld)
- 1972 – Rebecca Romijn, American model and actress
- 1973 – David Giffin, Australian rugby union player
- 1974 – Frank Vandenbroucke, Belgian cyclist (died 2009)
- 1976 – Sal Vulcano, American comedian and actor
- 1978 – Erik Cole, American ice hockey player
- 1978 – Zak Morioka, Brazilian race car driver
- 1979 – Adam LaRoche, American baseball player
- 1979 – Lamar Odom, American basketball player
- 1979 – Brad Stuart, Canadian ice hockey player
- 1981 – Kaspars Gorkšs, Latvian footballer
- 1981 – Luke Jackson, American basketball player and coach
- 1981 – Andrew Murray, Canadian ice hockey player
- 1983 – Nicole Hosp, Austrian skier
- 1984 – Ricky Romero, American baseball player
- 1984 – Sebastian Schachten, German footballer
- 1985 – Sun Yue, Chinese basketball player
- 1986 – Ben Rector, American singer, songwriter and musician
- 1986 – Conor Sammon, Irish footballer
- 1987 – Ana Ivanovic, Serbian tennis player
- 1988 – John Holland, Puerto Rican-American basketball player
- 1988 – Erik Lund, Swedish footballer
- 1988 – James Paxton, Canadian baseball player
- 1988 – Emma Stone, American actress
- 1988 – Conchita Wurst, Austrian singer
- 1989 – Jozy Altidore, American soccer player
- 1989 – Aaron Hernandez, American football player (died 2017)
- 1990 – André Schürrle, German footballer
- 1990 – Akua Shōma, Japanese sumo wrestler
- 1990 – Bowen Yang, Australian-born American actor, comedian, podcaster, and writer
- 1991 – Doron Lamb, American basketball player
- 1992 – Rebecca Allen, Australian basketball player
- 1992 – Nasya Dimitrova, Bulgarian volleyball player
- 1992 – Paula Kania-Choduń, Polish tennis player
- 1992 – Kim Ah-young, South Korean singer and actress
- 1992 – Stefan Ortega, German footballer
- 1993 – Josh Wakefield, English footballer
- 1994 – Isaah Yeo, Australian rugby league player
- 1995 – Addin Fonua-Blake, Australian-Tongan rugby league player
- 1995 – Sam Reinhart, Canadian ice hockey player
- 1997 – Aliona Bolsova, Spanish-Moldovan tennis player
- 1997 – Hero Fiennes-Tiffin, English actor and model
- 1997 – Elena-Gabriela Ruse, Romanian tennis player
- 2001 – Day'Ron Sharpe, American basketball player
- 2002 – Elliot Anderson, English footballer

== Deaths ==
=== Pre-1600 ===
- 1003 – Pope John XVII
- 1312 – Christina von Stommeln, Roman Catholic mystic and stigmatic (born 1242)
- 1406 – Pope Innocent VII (born 1339)
- 1492 – Antoine Busnois, French composer and poet (born 1430)

=== 1601–1900 ===
- 1656 – Jean-Baptiste Morin, French mathematician, astrologer, and astronomer (born 1583)
- 1672 – Heinrich Schütz, German organist and composer (born 1585)
- 1692 – Gédéon Tallemant des Réaux, French author and poet (born 1619)
- 1730 – Hans Hermann von Katte, Prussian lieutenant (born 1704)
- 1752 – Ralph Erskine, Scottish minister (born 1685)
- 1816 – Gouverneur Morris, American scholar, politician, and diplomat, United States Ambassador to France (born 1752)
- 1893 – Pyotr Ilyich Tchaikovsky, Russian composer (born 1840)

=== 1901–present ===
- 1916 – Ali Dinar, last Sultan of Dafur (born ca. 1865)
- 1918 – Alan Arnett McLeod, Canadian lieutenant, Victoria Cross recipient (born 1899)
- 1942 – Emil Starkenstein, Czech pharmacologist and academic (born 1884)
- 1955 – Edwin Barclay, 18th president of Liberia (born 1882)
- 1964 – Hugo Koblet, Swiss cyclist (born 1925)
- 1965 – Clarence Williams, American singer-songwriter, pianist, and producer (born 1898)
- 1968 – Chauncey Sparks, American politician and 41st Governor of Alabama (born 1884)
- 1978 – Heiri Suter, Swiss cyclist (born 1899)
- 1984 – Gastón Suárez, Bolivian author and playwright (born 1929)
- 1985 – Sanjeev Kumar, Indian film actor (born 1938)
- 1987 – Zohar Argov, Israeli singer (born 1955)
- 1991 – Gene Tierney, American actress (born 1920)
- 1998 – Sky Low Low, Canadian wrestler (born 1928)
- 2000 – L. Sprague de Camp, American historian and author (born 1907)
- 2003 – Just Betzer, Danish production manager and producer (born 1944)
- 2003 – Rie Mastenbroek, Dutch swimmer and coach (born 1919)
- 2004 – Johnny Warren, Australian footballer, manager, and sportscaster (born 1943)
- 2005 – Rod Donald, New Zealand lawyer and politician (born 1957)
- 2005 – Anthony Sawoniuk, Belarusian SS officer (born 1921)
- 2006 – Francisco Fernández Ochoa, Spanish skier (born 1950)
- 2006 – Federico López, Mexican-Puerto Rican basketball player (born 1962)
- 2007 – Hilda Braid, English actress and singer (born 1929)
- 2007 – George Grljusich, Australian footballer and sportscaster (born 1939)
- 2007 – Hank Thompson, American singer-songwriter and guitarist (born 1925)
- 2009 – Ron Sproat, American screenwriter and playwright (born 1932)
- 2010 – Robert Lipshutz, American soldier and lawyer, 17th White House Counsel (born 1921)
- 2011 – Roger Faulques, French military officer and mercenary (born 1924)
- 2012 – Joel Connable, American journalist and actor (born 1973)
- 2012 – Clive Dunn, English actor (born 1920)
- 2012 – Frank J. Prial, American journalist and author (born 1930)
- 2013 – Tarla Dalal, Indian chef and author (born 1936)
- 2013 – Ace Parker, American football and baseball player (born 1912)
- 2014 – Maggie Boyle, English singer and flute player (born 1956)
- 2014 – Tommy Macpherson, Scottish soldier and businessman (born 1920)
- 2014 – Rick Rosas, American bass player (born 1949)
- 2015 – Bobby Campbell, English footballer and manager (born 1937)
- 2015 – Yitzhak Navon, Israeli author, playwright, and politician, 5th President of Israel (born 1921)
- 2017 – Richard F. Gordon Jr., American naval officer, aviator, test pilot, and NASA astronaut (born 1929)
- 2018 – Bernard Landry, Canadian lawyer, politician and Premier of Quebec (born 1937)
- 2020 – Ken Spears, American writer (born 1938)
- 2020 – King Von, American rapper (born 1994)
- 2023 – Antoni Martí, Andorran politician, former Prime Minister of Andorra (born 1963)
- 2024 – Dorothy Allison, American writer (born 1949)
- 2024 – John Nott, British politician (born 1932)
- 2024 – Madeleine Riffaud, French poet, journalist and Resistance member (born 1924)
- 2024 – Tony Todd, American actor (born 1954)
- 2025 – Rick Hauck, American naval officer, fighter pilot, and NASA astronaut (born 1941)
- 2025 – James Watson, American molecular biologist, geneticist, and zoologist (born 1928)

== Holidays and observances ==
- Christian feast days:
  - Barlaam of Khutyn
  - Blessed Christina von Stommeln
  - Demetrian
  - Illtud
  - Leonard of Noblac
  - Sixty Martyrs of Gaza
  - Melaine of Rennes
  - Severus of Barcelona
  - Winnoc
  - November 6 (Eastern Orthodox liturgics)
- Gustavus Adolphus Day (in Sweden, Finland and Estonia)
- Finnish Swedish Heritage Day (in Finland)
- International Day for Preventing the Exploitation of the Environment in War and Armed Conflict
- Obama Day (in Kenya)
