= Codex Iuliacensis =

Medieval book

The Codex Iuliacensis is a mediaeval book, dating to about 1320 to 1350. The adjective "Iuliacensis" refers to the Rhenish town of Jülich, Latin "Iuliacum", formerly capital of the county / duchy of the same name.

The Codex Iuliacensis is written in Latin and is now kept at the Library of the Diocese of Aachen (Aix-la-Chapelle). The Codex is famous for its description of Blessed Christina von Stommeln and the first record of a woman to have received the stigmata.
