= Tortelier =

Tortelier is a French surname. Notable people with the surname include:

- Étienne Tortelier (born 1990), French road cyclist
- Joseph Tortelier (1854–1925), French carpenter, labor activist, and anarchist
- Paul Tortelier (1914–1990), French cellist and composer
- Yan Pascal Tortelier (born 1947), French conductor and violinist, son of Paul
