= Anarchist League =

Anarchist League may refer to:

- French anarchist leagues, two leagues active in 1880s-1890s France
- Revolutionary Anarchist Bowling League, a militant American anti-war collective established in 1987
- A fictional organization in the novelette "The Last of the Masters" (1954), by Philip K. Dick
