= Shigeko Kagawa =

Japanese supercentenarian (1911–2026)

- 賀川滋子
- Born: 28 May 1911; Yamatokōriyama, Nara Prefecture, Japan
- Died: 27 August 2026 (aged 115 years, 91 days); Yamatokōriyama, Nara Prefecture, Japan
- Education: Osaka Women's Medical College
- Known for: Oldest living person in Japan (29 July 2025 – 27 August 2026)
- Children: 1

Shigeko Kagawa (28 May 1911 – 27 August 2026) was a Japanese supercentenarian who was Japan's oldest living person from the death of Miyoko Hiroyasu on 29 July 2025 until her death on 27 August 2026.

== Biography ==
Shigeko Kagawa was born in Yamatokōriyama, Nara Prefecture, Japan on May 28, 1911 during the reign of the Emperor Meiji. She was born into a family of doctors and graduated from Osaka Women's Medical College (now Kansai Medical University). Kagawa worked at the Osaka Hospital during World War II.

Following the war, she had a daughter and, afterwards in 1947, got married. Later, she took control of the family clinic and worked as an obstetrician and gynaecologist. Every night, she kept her phone by the bed to answer the morning and night calls of patients in need. She retired at the age of 86. Former patients often stopped by to thank her for her contributions.

On April 12, 2021, aged 109, Kagawa carried the Olympic torch at the Tokyo Olympic Games, becoming the world's oldest Olympic torchbearer. Her record was supposed to be broken by Kane Tanaka, but the event was cancelled due to the risk of COVID-19. Kagawa completed her relay section in a wheelchair, which was pushed by her granddaughter, although she stood to pass the torch to the next torchbearer.

Kagawa partly explained that she believed her longevity was caused by a lot of walking in her youth. As a student, she walked several kilometres on dirt roads before taking a train to school. Throughout her career, she often wore clogs and walked long distances on foot to visit patients.

After retirement, she liked to sew, make bags, and remodel clothes for her family, both by sewing machine and by hand. She was also an avid viewer of Omoikkiri TV and saved the episodes on VHS tapes. Kagawa also recorded health tips in notebooks.

When she was middle-aged she loved sashimi, but later began to prefer tofu, eggs and black beans, as well as soft foods such as pottage, pudding, shiruko, and especially red bean sweets.

At the age of 108, she was still living alone, supported by her daughter. In February 2025, at the age of 113 years and 9 months, she underwent hip surgery after a fracture.

In 2025, at the age of 114, she continued to live in her home in Yamatokoriyama, Nara Prefecture. Every day, she read a newspaper with a magnifying glass and, twice a week, went to day care, where she played brain-training games on a tablet. She also enjoyed doing calligraphy.

On 29 July 2025, following the death of Miyoko Hiroyasu, she became the oldest living person in Japan.

Kagawa died in Yamatokōriyama, Nara Prefecture on 27 August 2026, at the age of 115 years and 91 days.

== See also ==
- List of the verified oldest people
- List of Japanese supercentenarians
