= Ligue des Anti-propriétaires =

Ligues des Anti-propriétaires
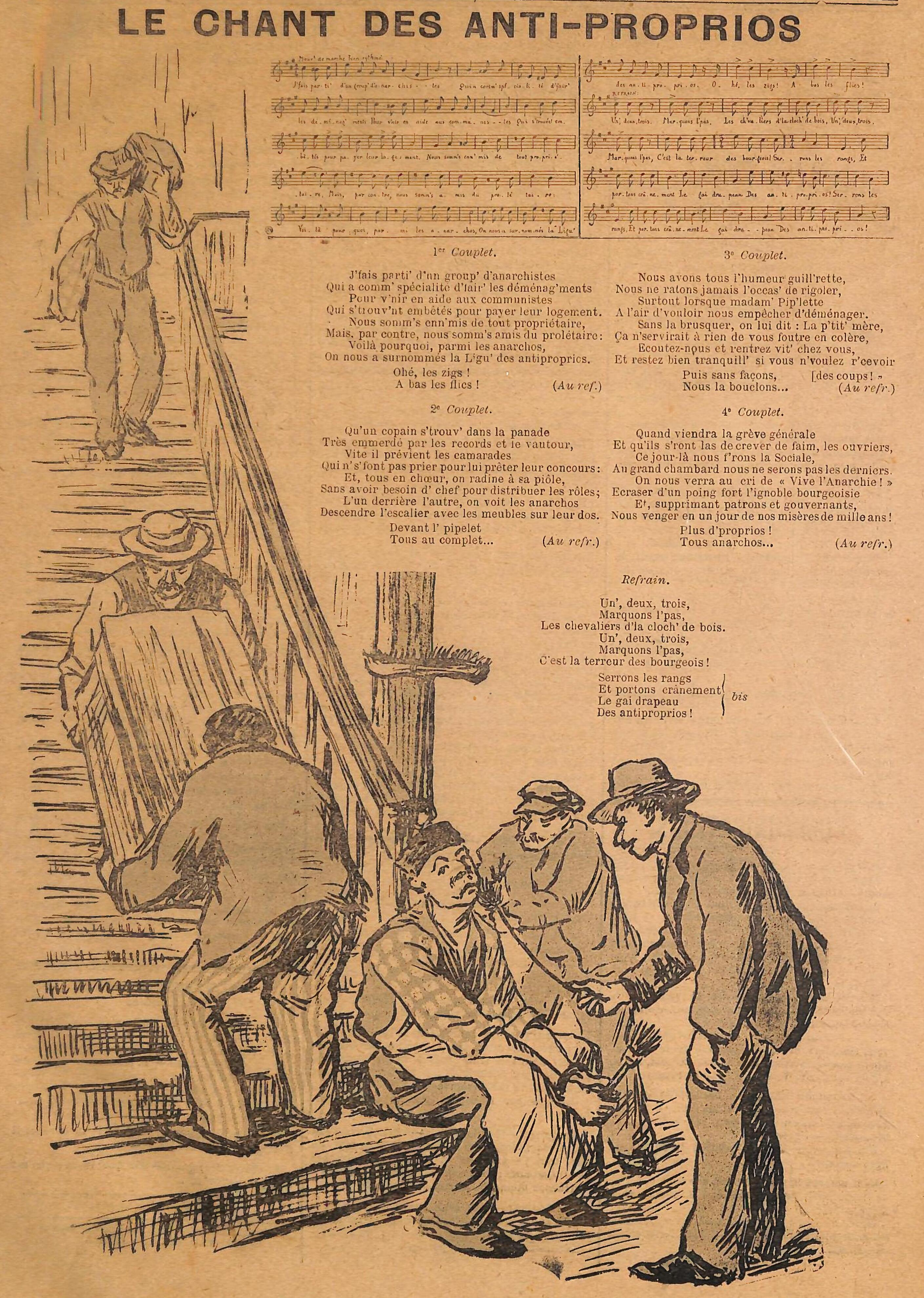
- The Chant des anti-proprios, anthem of the League, in Le Père Peinard of 23 May 1893
- Founders: Jean Couchot; Vittorio Pini (according to the police); Joseph Tortelier (?)
- Dates active: 1886-1894 (?)
- Active regions: France
- Ideology: Anarchism
- Political position: Far-left
- Status: Defunct

The Ligue des Anti-propriétaires (English: Anti-Landlords/Owners League) was one of the French anarchist leagues founded in 1886 and active until the repression of 1894. Bringing mostly together anarchists from the Île-de-France region close to those of the Ligue des antipatriotes, it is known for playing a central role in the invention and propagation of the practice of squatting.

Founded to meet the anarchists' need for national-scale structures, it brought together several figures of the movement, such as Joseph Tortelier, the theorist of the general strike, or potentially the illegalist Vittorio Pini. It was supported by syndicalist anarchist circles and the anarchist press of the period, such as La Révolte and Le Père Peinard. The League was primarily involved in déménagements à la cloche de bois, which consisted of secretly moving out tenants who were defaulting on rent. Most of these moves were peaceful, although conflicts could arise in some cases. By publicizing its actions, the League succeeded in turning housing into a political issue and making the right to housing a subject of collective struggle, leading some historians to identify it as the organization behind the invention of modern squatting.

The League disappeared during the repression of 1894, but its actions were taken up by very diverse groups and spread thereafter. Several anarchist artists wrote songs about it.

== History ==
=== Context ===
The anarchist movement emerged around the Saint-Imier Congress (1872) before spreading widely. Initially, anarchists were gathered within the Anti-Authoritarian International, which evolved into the Black International in the early 1880s.

This organization disappeared during the 1880s, as did the first anarchist federations in France, which gravitated around Lyon and the Rhône, dissolved by the anarchists themselves to evade the repression of 1883. This left French anarchists without structures capable of uniting them beyond local groups. However, this situation did not last long; as early as 1883, authorities noticed that anarchists were once again coordinating between groups in a fairly uniform manner, despite the suppression of the federations. They thus initiated anarchist companionship.

=== Ligue des Anti-propriétaires ===
==== Foundation and members: key support in the anarchist press, among syndicalist anarchists, and Parisian roots ====
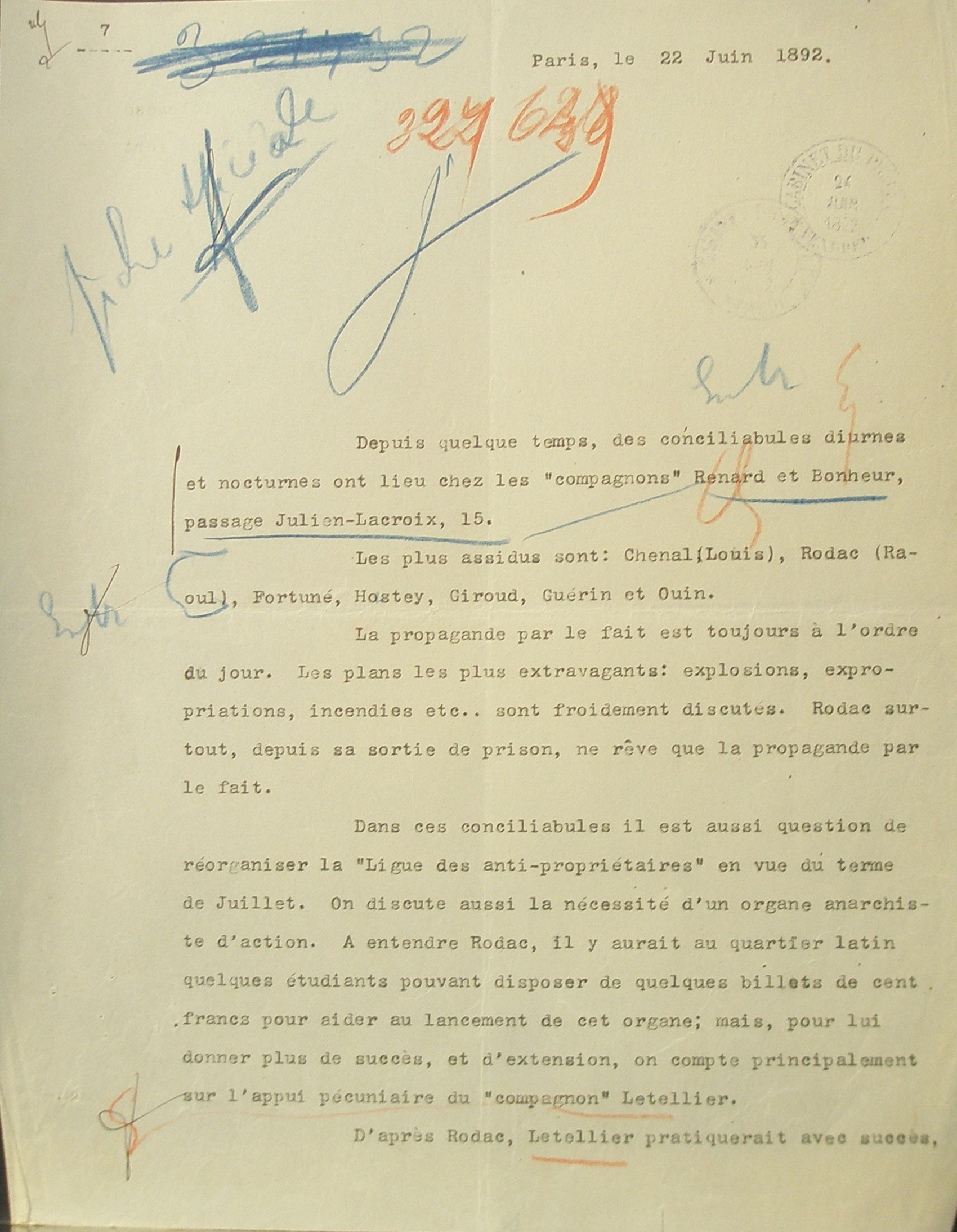
Police report on the snitch Eugène Renard, who was a member, and on the League (collection of Archives Anarchistes)

In 1886, Parisian anarchists founded two leagues in response to the Ligue des patriotes. The first was the Ligue des antipatriotes, founded by the Jeunesse anarchiste de Belleville group. This league, intended to conduct anti-militarist and anti-patriotic propaganda activities, brought together a number of Parisian groups and was able to operate in broader French regions and abroad.

A few months later, in December, companion Jean Couchot founded the Ligue des Anti-propriétaires along with other anarchists. According to police official Marie-François Goron, the Italian anarchist Vittorio Pini was reportedly one of the league's founders. This league had no legal status, no legal existence, no official headquarters, and no bylaws; its membership frequently overlapped with that of the other league. Among its members were Octave Jahn and Joseph Tortelier, one of the primary theorists and innovators of the general strike. The police noted that syndicalist anarchists from the Chambre syndicale des hommes de peine reportedly supported the league or were even members of it.

Furthermore, the league was backed by La Révolte and Le Père Peinard, two central anarchist newspapers of the period, allowing it to achieve a national, and even broader, media resonance.

==== Actions: Déménagement à la cloche de bois and the invention of squatting ====
The league was primarily involved in illegalist actions of the nature of the déménagement à la cloche de bois, meaning discreetly moving out tenants who were defaulting on rent, often at night, in order to prevent landlords from collecting the term's rent. To this end, as rent day approached, league members would reportedly offer their services to interested parties looking to call upon them, according to the police.

In the vast majority of cases, these moves were carried out silently and peacefully during the night, but conflicts could occasionally emerge during the action between concierges or police officers and the anarchists extracting themselves from the housing. For instance, in 1887, Paolo Chiericotti and two other Italian anarchists attempting to do so fought with their landlord. Following the landlord's complaint and the conviction of one of the three, his shop was targeted by a bombing during the night. Pini was later one of the main suspects for the attack, though the police could not conclusively prove his involvement.

The fact that almost all actions involved little conflict on the ground is explained by the fact that French law at the time only prevented a tenant from fleeing on the condition that a huissier was present, which made action impossible or complicated for concierges or authorities in most situations. Therefore, these were not violent actions most of the time.

In any case, the league engaged in a very large number of déménagements à la cloche de bois. In doing so, they turned housing into a political issue and, aided by La Révolte and especially Le Père Peinard, publicized their actions. For squatting historian Cécile Péchu, this truly marks the birth of squatting, because the league succeeded in transforming an individual mode of action into a collective, publicized mode of action, celebrated in the anarchist press, and turned it into a political action. She synthetizes, on this subject:

Modes of action always find their origin in daily experience. The occupation of housing stems from the 'déménagements à la cloche de bois' carried out by anarchists at the end of the 19th century, a practice consisting of leaving without paying one's rent. Initially a clandestine and individual form of resistance, squatting progressively became a collective mode of protest.

==== Repression and decline ====
The league disappeared during the repressions of 1894, but certain groups continued to carry out déménagements à la cloche de bois until at least 1897.

== Legacy ==
=== Squatting and songs ===
Beyond the league's considerable influence on the birth and trajectory of squatting, with the practice of déménagements à la cloche de bois being taken up later by the Pieds Plats, the General Confederation of Labour (CGT), or the Union syndicale des locataires ouvriers et employés de la Seine, it was also celebrated in art.

Thus, several anarchist songs paid tribute to its activities, including one written by Jules Jouy and published in 1897.

=== Coordinating and unifying role in the anarchist movement ===
More prosaically, the league emerged at a time when French anarchists were looking to establish structures spanning larger areas than just local groups. It met this need and, according to historian Vivien Bouhey, helped coordinate and unify the actions and thinking of militants during this period.

== Bibliography ==
- Bouhey, Vivien (2008), Les Anarchistes contre la République [The Anarchists against the Republic] (in French), Rennes: Presses universitaires de Rennes (PUR)
- Davranche, Guillaume; Petit, Dominique (2024), "CHIERICOTTI Paul [Pierre, Paul, Jacques, dit ; aussi Chericotti, Ricotti, Paul LAURENT", Dictionnaire des anarchistes (Le Maitron), Paris: Le Maitron des anarchistes
- Maitron, Jean (1955), Histoire du mouvement anarchiste en France (1800-1914) (in French), Paris: Histoire du mouvement anarchiste en France, 1880-1914
- Péchu, Cécile (2010), Les squats [Squats], Contester, Paris: Presses de Sciences Po (PSP), doi:10.3917/scpo.pechu.2010.01, ISBN 978-2-7246-1169-4
