= Petrus de Dacia (Dominican friar) =

Swedish Dominican friar

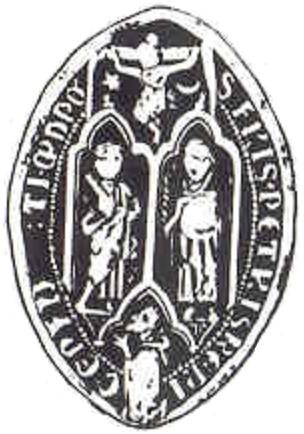
Seal of Petrus de Dacia.

Petrus de Dacia (c. 1235 – 1289) was a 13th-century Swedish friar of the Dominican Order. He was most noted for his correspondence with the mystic and ecstatic Christina von Stommeln. Though he wrote in Latin, Petrus de Dacia is often credited as the first author in Sweden.

== Biography ==
Petrus de Dacia was born around 1235 on the Swedish island of Gotland. He entered the Dominican order and studied in Cologne from 1266 to 1269 and in Paris from 1269 to 1270. In 1271 he was appointed lector in the convent at Skänninge in Östergötland. In 1283 he became Prior of Sankt Nicolaus abbey church in Gotland where he died in 1288.

While at Cologne, he had met Christina von Stommeln (1242–1312). Christina lived around Stommeln near Cologne and had entered the convent of the Beguines at Cologne. Over a period of two decades, she reportedly received stigmata on an annual basis. Petrus visited Christine in 1270 on his way back from Paris and again in 1279. He also maintained a lifetime correspondence with her.

== Other sources ==
- Sebastian Sobecki (2006). "Peter of Dacia". In Geary, Patrick, Lexikon des Mittelalters/International Encyclopaedia for the Middle Ages.
- Sebastian Sobecki (2006). "Petrus von Dacien, O.P. (Petrus de Dacia, Petrus av Dacia, Pierre de Dacie, Peter of Dacia, Petrus Daciensis, Petrus Gutensis, Petrus Gothensis)". In Bautz, Traugott (ed.). Biographisch-Bibliographisches Kirchenlexikon (BBKL) (in German). Vol. 26. Nordhausen: Bautz. cols. 1116–1119. ISBN 3-88309-354-8.
- Petrus de Dacia, Om den saliga jungfrun Kristina av Stommeln trans. by Tryggve Lundén (Stockholm: Albert Bonniers Förlag. 1950),
