= List of Japanese supercentenarians =

List of Japanese citizens who lived 110 years or beyond

Japanese supercentenarians are citizens, residents or emigrants from Japan who have attained or surpassed the age of 110 years. As of January 2015, the Gerontology Research Group (GRG) had validated the longevity claims of 263 Japanese supercentenarians, most of whom are women. As of 19 November 2026, the oldest-known living Japanese person is Fuyo Kishimoto (born in Hamasaka on 20 December 1911), who is aged 114 years, 334 days. The oldest verified Japanese and Asian person ever is Kane Tanaka (1903–2022), who lived to the age of 119 years and 107 days, making her the second-oldest validated person ever as well. Japan was also home to the world's oldest man ever, Jiroemon Kimura (1897–2013), who lived to the age of 116 years and 54 days.

== 100 oldest-known Japanese ==
Deceased Living

Rank	Name	Sex	Birth date	Death date	Age	Birthplace	Place of death or residence
1	Kane Tanaka	F	2 January 1903	19 April 2022	119 years, 107 days	Fukuoka	Fukuoka
2	Nabi Tajima	F	4 August 1900	21 April 2018	117 years, 260 days	Kagoshima	Kagoshima
3	Chiyo Miyako	F	2 May 1901	22 July 2018	117 years, 81 days	Wakayama	Kanagawa
4	Misao Okawa	F	5 March 1898	1 April 2015	117 years, 27 days	Osaka	Osaka
5	Fusa Tatsumi	F	25 April 1907	12 December 2023	116 years, 231 days	Osaka	Osaka
6	Tomiko Itooka	F	23 May 1908	29 December 2024	116 years, 220 days	Osaka	Hyōgo
7	Tane Ikai	F	18 January 1879	12 July 1995	116 years, 175 days	Aichi	Aichi
8	Jiroemon Kimura	M	19 April 1897	12 June 2013	116 years, 54 days	Kyoto	Kyoto
9	Shigeyo Nakachi	F	1 February 1905	11 January 2021	115 years, 345 days	Saga	Saga
10	Shimoe Akiyama	F	19 May 1903	29 January 2019	115 years, 255 days	Aichi	Aichi
11	Okagi Hayashi	F	2 September 1909	26 April 2025	115 years, 236 days	Gifu	Gifu
12	Anonymous	F	15 March 1900	27 September 2015	115 years, 196 days	Tokyo	Tokyo
13	Shin Matsushita	F	30 March 1904	27 August 2019	115 years, 150 days	Miyagi	Miyagi
14	Shigeko Kagawa	F	28 May 1911	27 August 2026	115 years, 91 days	Nara	Nara
15	Mina Kitagawa	F	3 November 1905	19 December 2020	115 years, 46 days	Shiga	Shiga
16	Yoshi Otsunari	F	17 December 1906	26 January 2022	115 years, 40 days	Fukuoka	Fukuoka
17	Koto Ōkubo	F	24 December 1897	12 January 2013	115 years, 19 days	Tokyo	Kanagawa
18	Chiyono Hasegawa	F	20 November 1896	2 December 2011	115 years, 12 days	Saga	Saga
19	Anonymous	F	29 April 1907	30 April 2022	115 years, 1 day	Hyōgo	Hyōgo
20	Kama Chinen	F	10 May 1895	2 May 2010	114 years, 357 days	Okinawa	Okinawa
21	Fuyo Kishimoto	F	20 December 1911	Living	114 years, 334 days	Hyōgo	Kyoto
22	Kahoru Furuya	F	18 February 1908	25 December 2022	114 years, 310 days	Shizuoka	Shizuoka
23	Kiyoko Ishiguro	F	4 March 1901	5 December 2015	114 years, 276 days	Tokyo	Kanagawa
24	Yukie Hino	F	17 April 1902	13 January 2017	114 years, 271 days	Niigata	Niigata
25	Mine Kondō	F	1 September 1910	20 May 2025	114 years, 261 days	Aichi	Aichi
26	Hide Ohira	F	15 September 1880	9 May 1995	114 years, 236 days	Wakayama	Wakayama
27	Masa Matsumoto	F	29 November 1909	9 July 2024	114 years, 223 days	Shiga	Kanagawa
28	Yone Minagawa	F	4 January 1893	13 August 2007	114 years, 221 days	Fukuoka	Fukuoka
29	Ura Koyama	F	30 August 1890	5 April 2005	114 years, 218 days	Hiroshima	Fukuoka
30	Yoshi Baba	F	3 June 1907	4 January 2022	114 years, 215 days	Yamanashi	Yamanashi
31	Iso Nakamura	F	23 April 1903	23 November 2017	114 years, 214 days	Ishikawa	Ishikawa
32	Haruno Yamashita	F	19 February 1905	4 September 2019	114 years, 197 days	Fukuoka	Fukuoka
33	Mitsue Toyoda	F	15 February 1902	25 August 2016	114 years, 192 days	Ōita	Ōita
34	Tase Matsunaga	F	11 May 1884	18 November 1998	114 years, 191 days	Niigata	Tokyo
34	Kame Ganeko	F	10 April 1905	18 October 2019	114 years, 191 days	Okinawa	Okinawa
36	Yukichi Chuganji	M	23 March 1889	28 September 2003	114 years, 189 days	Fukuoka	Fukuoka
37	Kame Nakamura	F	8 March 1898	12 September 2012	114 years, 188 days	Okinawa	Okinawa
38	Miyoko Hiroyasu	F	23 January 1911	29 July 2025	114 years, 187 days	Ōita	Ōita
39	Mitoyo Kawate	F	15 May 1889	13 November 2003	114 years, 182 days	Hiroshima	Hiroshima
40	Masu Usui	F	18 December 1910	21 May 2025	114 years, 154 days	Shizuoka	Shizuoka
41	Ina Okazawa	F	10 March 1910	9 August 2024	114 years, 152 days	Ibaraki	Ibaraki
42	Toshie Yorimitsu	F	30 September 1901	28 February 2016	114 years, 151 days	Kōchi	Okinawa
43	Ushi Makishi	F	15 February 1909	4 July 2023	114 years, 139 days	Okinawa	Okinawa
44	Kimiko Ono	F	20 June 1908	31 October 2022	114 years, 133 days	Wakayama	Osaka
45	Tae Ito	F	11 July 1903	13 November 2017	114 years, 125 days	Iwate	Iwate
46	Hama Yasukawa	F	19 January 1907	23 May 2021	114 years, 124 days	Hyōgo	Hyōgo
47	Chiyo Shiraishi	F	6 August 1895	19 November 2009	114 years, 105 days	Fukushima	Ibaraki
48	Hisako Shiroishi	F	19 May 1910	26 August 2024	114 years, 99 days	Saitama	Saitama
49	Michiko Yamazaki	F	28 July 1905	31 October 2019	114 years, 95 days	Nagano	Nagano
50	Asa Takii	F	28 April 1884	31 July 1998	114 years, 94 days	Hiroshima	Hiroshima
51	Tane Matsubara	F	15 October 1909	16 January 2024	114 years, 93 days	Tochigi	Hokkaido
52	Waka Shirahama	F	26 March 1878	16 June 1992	114 years, 82 days	Kagoshima	Miyazaki
52	Osugi Sogo	F	14 August 1905	4 November 2019	114 years, 82 days	Hiroshima	Ehime
54	Suekiku Miyanaga	F	7 April 1884	20 June 1998	114 years, 74 days	Kagoshima	Kagoshima
55	Yasue Okai	F	25 November 1908	6 February 2023	114 years, 73 days	Osaka	Osaka
56	Shige Hirooka	F	16 January 1897	29 March 2011	114 years, 72 days	Osaka	Osaka
57	Chihiro Takaoka	F	18 September 1912	Living	114 years, 62 days	unknown	Hyōgo
58	Kiyo Komatsu	F	27 January 1911	10 March 2025	114 years, 42 days	Ishikawa	Saitama
59	Hide Hamabe	F	3 December 1908	10 January 2023	114 years, 38 days	Miyazaki	Miyazaki
59	Seki Yoshida	F	4 January 1910	11 February 2024	114 years, 38 days	Ibaraki	Ibaraki
61	Anonymous	F	30 October 1912	Living	114 years, 20 days	unknown	Chiba
62	Tomoe Iwata	F	25 March 1904	13 April 2018	114 years, 19 days	Iwate	Iwate
63	Tane Yonekura	F	2 May 1904	19 May 2018	114 years, 17 days	Kagoshima	Kagoshima
64	Kura Bingo	F	20 October 1905	31 October 2019	114 years, 11 days	Nara	Nara
65	Yoshiyo Bessho	F	1 April 1904	8 April 2018	114 years, 7 days	Okayama	Okayama
66	Fujiko Mihara	F	13 December 1910	18 December 2024	114 years, 5 days	Ehime	Ehime
67	Kikue Taira	F	26 April 1910	18 April 2024	113 years, 358 days	Okinawa	Okinawa
68	Hatsue Ono	F	31 October 1898	17 October 2012	113 years, 352 days	Iwate	Hokkaido
69	Yasu Akino	F	1 March 1885	12 February 1999	113 years, 348 days	Shizuoka	Shizuoka
70	Nahi Yonamine	F	9 March 1908	7 February 2022	113 years, 335 days	Okinawa	Okinawa
71	Sumiko Mori	F	30 January 1912	21 December 2025	113 years, 325 days	Ōita	Mie
72	Yukie Takahashi	F	4 January 1913	Living	113 years, 319 days	unknown	Tokyo
73	Shinobu Hayashi	F	15 March 1909	25 January 2023	113 years, 316 days	Kumamoto	Kumamoto
74	Sayo Taminato	F	15 October 1906	7 August 2020	113 years, 297 days	Okinawa	Okinawa
74	Fumi Hoshino	F	30 October 1908	23 August 2022	113 years, 297 days	Tokyo	Tokyo
76	Kimi Asanuma	F	3 November 1905	22 August 2019	113 years, 292 days	Tokyo	Tokyo
77	Tsuneyo Toyonaga	F	21 May 1894	22 February 2008	113 years, 277 days	Kōchi	Kōchi
78	Tomoji Tanabe	M	18 September 1895	19 June 2009	113 years, 274 days	Miyazaki	Miyazaki
79	Mitsue Nagasaki	F	18 September 1899	17 June 2013	113 years, 272 days	Kumamoto	Hiroshima
80	Hisa Ono	F	8 December 1905	4 September 2019	113 years, 270 days	Saga	Saga
81	Shizue Nagata	F	25 July 1903	12 April 2017	113 years, 261 days	Kumamoto	Kumamoto
81	Teru Ōshiro	F	10 May 1904	26 January 2018	113 years, 261 days	Okinawa	Okinawa
81	Kimi Kawasaki	F	24 March 1909	10 December 2022	113 years, 261 days	Chiba	Kanagawa
84	Kiyo Itō	F	8 November 1911	24 July 2025	113 years, 258 days	Hokkaido	Hokkaido
85	Hatsuno Gotō	F	1 September 1903	15 May 2017	113 years, 256 days	Niigata	Tokyo
86	Tsurue Amō	F	1 March 1904	6 November 2017	113 years, 250 days	Tokushima	Tokushima
87	Katsuko Tago	F	28 March 1910	1 December 2023	113 years, 248 days	Nagano	Tokyo
88	Katsue Kurimoto	F	20 March 1907	22 November 2020	113 years, 247 days	Tokushima	Nara
89	Hisa Arai	F	10 September 1904	4 May 2018	113 years, 236 days	Gifu	Gifu
90	Shitsu Nakano	F	1 January 1894	19 August 2007	113 years, 230 days	Fukuoka	Fukuoka
90	Misao Uemura	F	7 November 1905	25 June 2019	113 years, 230 days	Fukushima	Shiga
92	Taka Tsuji	F	6 August 1906	4 March 2020	113 years, 211 days	Saga	Saga
93	Nobu Kawano	F	28 March 1911	22 October 2024	113 years, 208 days	Ibaraki	Kanagawa
94	Shina Seki	F	1 October 1909	25 April 2023	113 years, 206 days	Ibaraki	Ibaraki
95	Tsukimi Kishi	F	31 August 1905	19 March 2019	113 years, 200 days	Tochigi	Tochigi
96	Mitsuno Sato	F	9 April 1909	6 October 2022	113 years, 180 days	Akita	Akita
97	Masazō Nonaka	M	25 July 1905	20 January 2019	113 years, 179 days	Hokkaido	Hokkaido
98	Kiku Usami	F	1 September 1904	26 February 2018	113 years, 178 days	Niigata	Niigata
99	Ichi Kubota	F	30 May 1913	Living	113 years, 173 days	Iwate	Iwate
100	Tame Yamaguchi	F	20 March 1907	6 September 2020	113 years, 170 days	Kagoshima	Miyazaki

== Biographies ==
=== Tane Ikai ===
Tane Ikai (猪飼たね, Ikai Tane; 18 January 1879 – 12 July 1995) had been, until her death, Japan's oldest person following the death of 114-year-old Waka Shirahama in 1992, while also being the first person in Japan to reach the ages of 115 and 116 and being the last Japanese person born in the 1870s.

Tane Ikai was born in Aichi, Empire of Japan on 18 January 1879. She married at 20 and had three sons and a daughter. She separated from her husband in 1917 at the age of 38.

On a typical day, Ikai would eat three meals of rice porridge. In 1968, at the age of 89, she moved into a nursing home where she was to live for the next 20 years. She played an active role in activities at the home and enjoyed making pottery and sewing until suffering her first stroke in 1978 at the age of 99. In 1988, at the age of 109, Ikai suffered another stroke and was moved to a hospital, where she remained bedridden for the rest of her life. She died of kidney failure on 12 July 1995.

=== Denzō Ishizaki ===
Denzō Ishizaki (石崎 伝蔵, Ishizaki Denzō; 2 October 1886 (or 1884?) – 29 April 1999) was an elementary school teacher and town assembly member in his hometown Kansago, Ibaraki Prefecture. At the time of his death, Ishizaki had been the world's oldest-living man for almost 18 weeks. He died of multiple organ failure on 29 April 1999 at age 112 (or 114?) years and 209 days, and was the oldest Japanese man ever (until October 2001, when his record was broken by Yukichi Chuganji). However, Ishizaki claimed to be two years older, asserting that his birth register had been "delayed by two years". In July 2023, LongeviQuest determined that Ishizaki was born 18 days earlier than previously believed, based on his family records.

=== Yukichi Chuganji ===
Yukichi Chuganji (中願寺 雄吉; Chūganji Yūkichi, 23 March 1889 – 28 September 2003) was a Japanese silkworm breeder and specialist, bank employee and community welfare officer who lived for 114 years and 189 days. At the time of his death, he was the oldest Japanese man ever and the world's oldest-living person. He was the fourth out of currently six known men to hold the title.

His diet consisted primarily of meat. He also ate toffee, drank milk, the occasional apple juice and only drank alcohol in moderation, which he believed were the secrets to a long life. He died of natural causes on the evening of 28 September 2003, after being served a glass of apple juice by his 74-year-old daughter, who was his only living child. Besides five children, Chuganji also had seven grandchildren and twelve great-grandchildren.

=== Misao Okawa ===
Misao Okawa (大川ミサヲ, Okawa Misao; 5 March 1898 – 1 April 2015) became the world's oldest-living person following the death of 116-year-old Jiroemon Kimura in June 2013 until her own death in 2015.

Misao Okawa was born on 5 March 1898 in Tenma-Ku (now Kita-ku), Osaka Prefecture, Empire of Japan. Prior to her marriage, she helped with her family's clothing business. In 1919, she married her husband Yukio, who ran his own business in Kobe. They had three children, two daughters and a son. In February 2013, one of her daughters, Shizuyo, and her son Hiroshi, were still alive. After twelve years of marriage, Yukio Okawa died on 20 June 1931 at the age of 36 from heart disease. Following the death of her husband, Okawa moved back to Osaka with her three children. Okawa lived with her son and daughter-in-law. In 2000, she broke her leg at the age of 102. She was able to walk until she was age 110, after which she needed a wheelchair.

Okawa died in Higashisumiyoshi-ku, Osaka, Japan, on 1 April 2015 from heart failure, at the age of 117 years, 27 days.

=== Nabi Tajima ===
Nabi Tajima (田島 ナビ, Tajima Nabi; 4 August 1900 – 21 April 2018) succeeded Violet Brown as the world's oldest person after Brown's death on 15 September 2017. She died seven months later and was the last person verified as having been born in the 19th century.

Tajima was born and died on the small island of Kikaijima in the Amami Islands chain, about halfway between Okinawa and the main Japanese islands. Her husband, Tominishi Tajima (田島 富二子), died aged 93 in 1991. She had nine children: seven sons and two daughters, and in September 2017 she was reported to have had around 160 descendants, including great-great-great-grandchildren. She stated that her longevity was due to sleeping soundly and eating delicious food. Guinness World Records was planning to certify Tajima as the world's oldest person, but she died at a nursing home in Kikai shortly before they could do so.

She died at age 117 years and 260 days on 21 April 2018, and was the oldest Japanese person ever until Kane Tanaka surpassed her age in September 2020.

=== Yasutaro Koide ===
Yasutaro Koide (小出 保太郎, Koide Yasutarō; 13 March 1903 – 19 January 2016) worked as a tailor for a men's clothes shop in Tsuruga, Fukui. He moved to Nagoya when he was 107 years old, to live with his daughter. When he turned 110, Koide could still read newspapers without eyeglasses and eat without dentures.

On 31 March 2014, Koide became the oldest-living person in Aichi Prefecture following the death of Nagoya resident Tsuya Miura, who died at the age of 111. He became the oldest-living man in the world following the death of Sakari Momoi on 5 July 2015, a feat which was recognized by Guinness World Records on 21 August 2015. When asked about the secret to his long life, Koide responded by stating that "the best thing is to not overdo" and recommending abstinence from smoking or drinking.

Koide died on 19 January 2016 due to heart failure and pneumonia in a hospital in Nagoya at the age of 112 years, 312 days.

=== Masazō Nonaka ===
Masazō Nonaka (野中 正造, Nonaka Masazō; 25 July 1905 – 20 January 2019) had been, until his death, Japan's oldest-living man since October 2016, and the world's oldest-living man for one year, since January 2018. Nonaka was also the oldest person ever born in Hokkaidō.

He had two brothers and three sisters; Nonaka married Hatsuno Nonaka in 1931. They had five children, of whom three were living as of his death. He ran the family onsen, which opened in 1905. He spent most of his later years in a wheelchair, crediting his longevity to eating sweets and relaxing in the hot springs. Nonaka died on 20 January 2019, aged 113 years and 179 days.

=== Fusa Tatsumi ===
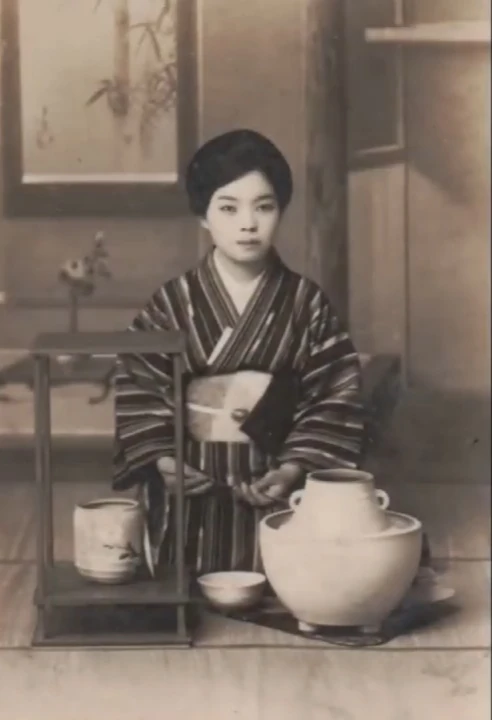
Fusa Tatsumi, c. 1920s

Fusa Tatsumi (巽フサ, Tatsumi Fusa; 25 April 1907 – 12 December 2023) was a Japanese supercentenarian. She was Japan's oldest-living person after the death of Kane Tanaka on 19 April 2022.

Fusa Tatsumi was born in Yao, Osaka Prefecture, Empire of Japan on 25 April 1907. Tatsumi moved into the Hakuto nursing home in Kashiwara, Osaka Prefecture, Japan in 2013. When she came to the nursing home she was in relatively good health, and was able to do gymnastics from her wheelchair. Aged 110, she was still able to do her own makeup. She was bedridden and rarely spoke in her later years. Tatsumi died of respiratory failure on 12 December 2023, aged 116 years and 231 days.

=== Tomiko Itooka ===
Tomiko Itooka (糸岡富子, Itooka Tomiko; 23 May 1908 – 29 December 2024) was a Japanese supercentenarian. She was Japan's oldest-living person after the death of Fusa Tatsumi on 12 December 2023. Tomiko Itooka was born in Osaka, Osaka Prefecture, Empire of Japan on 23 May 1908. She moved into a nursing home in Ashiya, Hyōgo in 2019. She was at the time still able to move independently, but later mainly used a wheelchair. On 19 August 2024, following Maria Branyas' death, she became the world's oldest-living person. Itooka died from natural causes on 29 December 2024, aged 116 years, 220 days.

=== Okagi Hayashi ===
Okagi Hayashi (林 おかぎ, Hayashi Okagi; 2 September 1909 – 26 April 2025) was a Japanese supercentenarian, who was the oldest living person in Japan.

Okagi Hayashi was born in the village of Tsumagi (now Tsumagicho, Toki), Gifu Prefecture, Empire of Japan, on 2 September 1909. In her early 20s, Hayashi married. Her husband was adopted into the Hayashi family, so she never changed her maiden name. They lived in Hokkaido Prefecture until her first son was born, and then returned to Toki where she took over her family's grain wholesale business. The couple had nine children in total. She had been cautious of her health since mid-life, drinking her homemade green juice every morning and exercising along with her husband. Until she was in her eighties, she enjoyed going on hot spring trips and gardening with her friends. Hayashi practiced calligraphy until she was in her nineties. She lived with her family in her home until she was 105. At the time of her 110th birthday, she had eight living children, 22 grandchildren, 39 great-grandchildren and five great-great-grandchildren. At the age of 112, she was still able to read newspapers and enjoyed playing puzzle games. Hayashi lived in Tsumagicho, Toki City, Gifu Prefecture, Japan before her death of heart failure on 26 April 2025, aged 115 years, 236 days.

=== Mine Kondō ===
Mine Kondō (Japanese: 近藤ミネ, Hepburn: Kondō Mine; September 1, 1910 – May 20, 2025) was a Japanese supercentenarian. For 24 days, she was the oldest known living person in Japan.

Kondō was born on September 1, 1910, in the village of Ikuma, which is now part of Toyota, Aichi. She married her husband at the age of 20 and had 9 children, but only 6 survived to adulthood. She worked as a farmer for much of her life while also raising silkworms and creating handmade paper. On March 2, 2023, Kondō became the oldest living person in Aichi Prefecture following the death of Shizu Narita. On April 26, 2025, Kondō became the oldest living person in Japan following the death of Okagi Hayashi. She died on May 20, 2025, at the age of 114 years, 261 days.

=== Miyoko Hiroyasu ===
Miyoko Hiroyasu (Japanese: 廣󠄁安美代子, Hiroyasu Miyoko; 23 January 1911 – 29 July 2025) was a Japanese supercentenarian who was the oldest living person in Japan. Her age is confirmed by both Gerontology Research Group and LongeviQuest.

Miyoko Hiroyasu was born on 23 January 1911 in Nakatsu, Ōita Prefecture. She studied art at a school in Tokyo and worked as an art teacher in Hiroshima Prefecture, where she met her future husband. The couple had three children together. On 23 January 2025, Hiroyasu celebrated her 114th birthday at her nursing home, although the official celebration was postponed due to a COVID-19 infection.

On 21 May 2025, after the death of Masu Usui, Miyoko Hiroyasu became the oldest living person in Japan.

On 29 July 2025, Hiroyasu died in Nakatsu at the age of 114 years, 187 days.

== See also ==
- Shigechiyo Izumi – wrongly assumed to have been the world's oldest man ever
