= Elvire Serrouin =

French anarchist (1839-?)

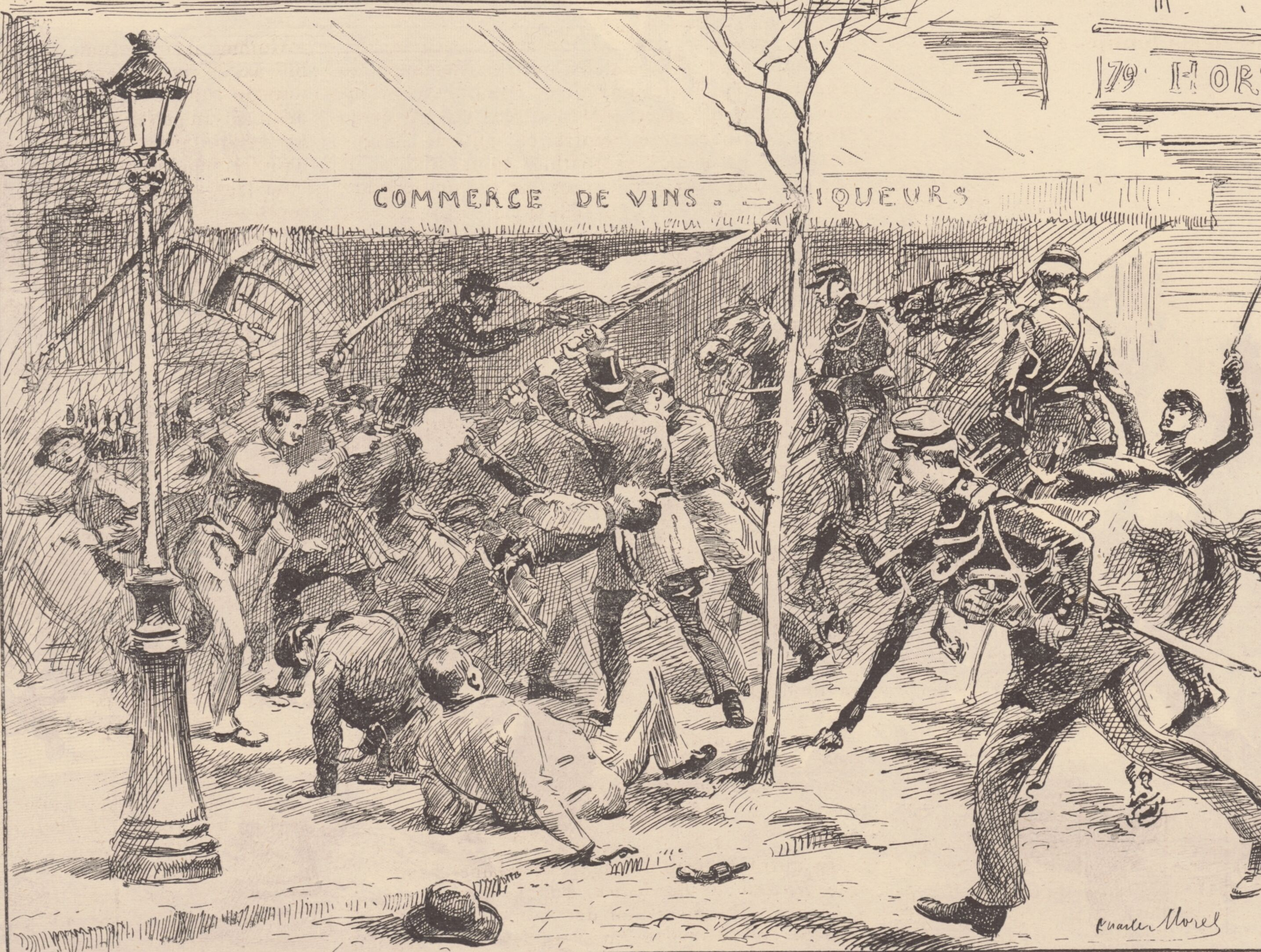
- Representation of the Clichy affair in Le Monde Illustré (9 May 1891)
- Born: Arsène Elvire Serrouin; November 6, 1839; Janville-en-Beauce, France
- Citizenship: France
- Occupations: Seamstress; Anarchist
- Known for: Black flag bearer during the Clichy affair (1 May 1891)
- Movement: Anarchism
- Spouse: Joseph Chauveau (m. 1876)

Elvire Serrouin (1839–?), was a French seamstress and anarchist. A staunch anarchist, she is best known for being the black flag bearer at the heart of the Clichy affair (1 May 1891), a notable event in the history of anarchism and the history of France.

Born into a family of modest means in Eure-et-Loir, Serrouin worked as a seamstress and married the wheelwright Joseph Chauveau in 1876. She then joined the anarchist movement in France, being noted as highly radical and ready for action. More politicized than her husband, she participated in numerous meetings and rallies within the groups she joined in the northern and eastern suburbs of Paris. She supported other companions, such as Émile Dodot, whom she helped at the factory during his illness. Above all, she took on a pivotal role during the Clichy affair, carrying the black flag at the head of the procession, which led to the conflict, the shooting, and the trial. She adopted Henri Decamps' daughter during his imprisonment to help her survive.

Serrouin was arrested during the repression of 1894 for criminal association and was later released. She expressed her satisfaction at the assassination of Sadi Carnot, but lamented the fact that he would be replaced by a new president.

Two years later, Serrouin was placed on the list of missing or nomadic anarchists.

== Biography ==
=== Youth and politicization ===
Arsène Elvire Serrouin was born on 6 November 1839 in Janville-en-Beauce. Her mother, who had no profession, was named Marie Arsène Genty, and her father was Charles François Serrouin.

She worked as a seamstress, finding wages wherever circumstances allowed her to work for a time. On 28 February 1876, she married the wheelwright Joseph Chauveau in Janville. The couple, who settled in Levallois-Perret, lived in extreme poverty; Chauveau had to sleep at his workplace, meaning she could only see him once a week.

She joined the anarchist movement in France during this period and attended anarchist meetings and rallies across the Paris region. She was accompanied by her husband during these activities, but was noted as being 'more politicized than him', according to historians Rolf Dupuy and Dominique Petit. The groups she joined in Saint-Denis and the surrounding areas were characterized by a young, working-class population and were relatively radical, advocating for ideas such as individual reclamation and propaganda of the deed.

=== Flag bearer of the Clichy affair ===
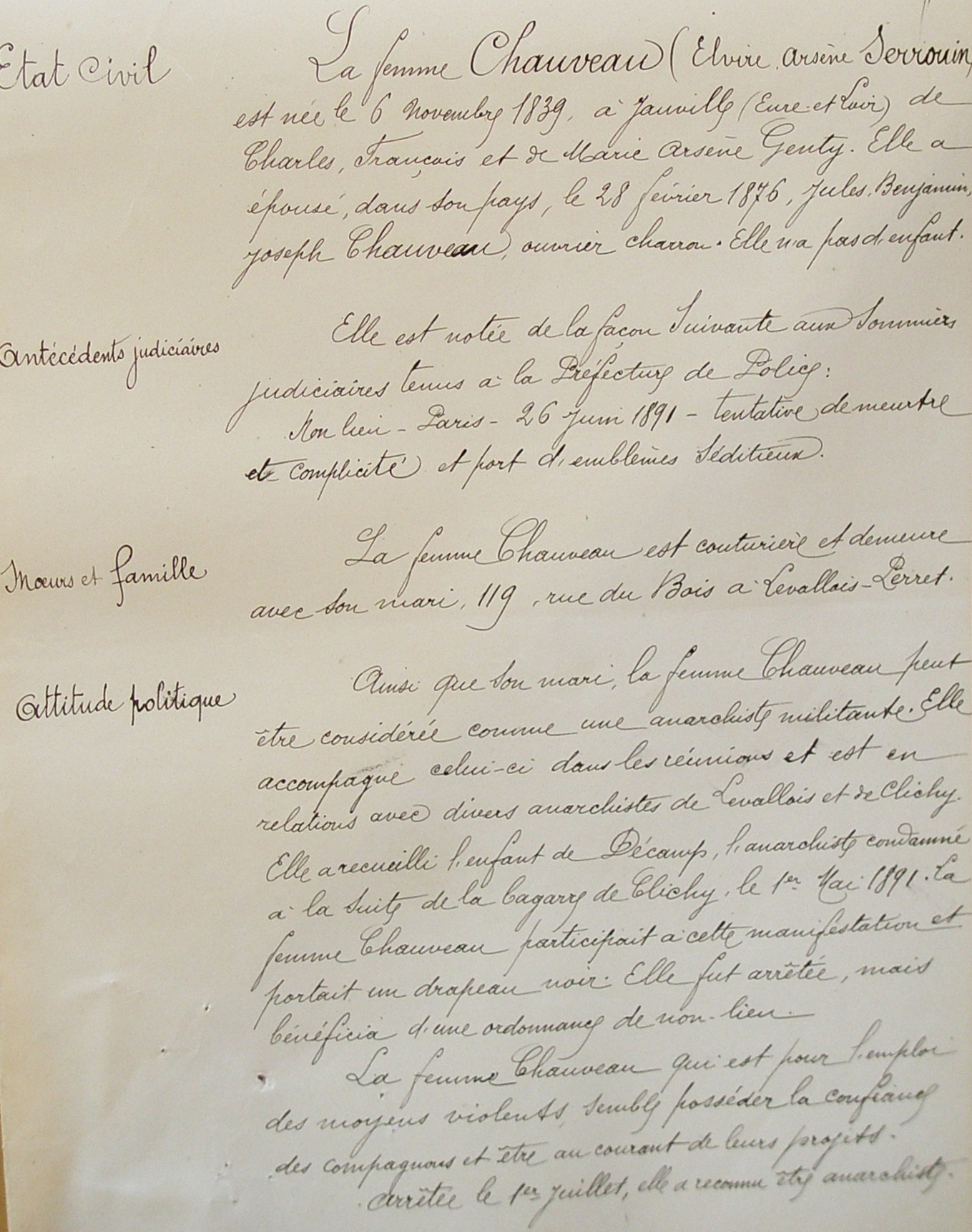
Report on Serrouin documenting her use of the black flag during the Clichy affair (collections of Archives Anarchistes)

Most notably, Serrouin took on a new level of importance during the Clichy affair. Indeed, during this event marked by police brutality and violent clashes between anarchists and the police, she was at the very front, carrying the black flag that sparked the conflict and the shooting. Chauveau also participated in the demonstration with her; both managed to flee after the first shots were fired.

Reflecting on the affair, Le Petit Journal wrote that:

Elvire Chauveau is a fanatic who assiduously attended anarchist meetings where she would lead her husband, a worthy worker with whom the police had never had to deal until now. During her interrogation, she expounded senseless theories and declared that she had worked for humankind. She and her husband, however, maintained that they were not armed and that they fled at the first revolver shots. Although these statements seem accurate, the arrest of the Chauveau couple was nonetheless upheld.

She was arrested and spent two months in pre-trial detention before being released.

Following the conviction of Henri Decamps for the affair, she took his daughter into her home. Serrouin was also noted for frequently visiting her companion Émile Dodot at his workplace, going to the factory to bring him food while he was ill.

=== Final years and disappearance ===
On 1 July 1894, during the repression of anarchists, her home was raided and she was arrested for criminal association. During this raid, she entrusted Decamps’ daughter to her neighbor, and the police found no incriminating evidence. She was incarcerated at the Saint-Lazare women's prison and was released on the 18th of the same month with no further legal action.

Serrouin reacted to the assassination of President Sadi Carnot by Sante Caserio by stating:

The most unfortunate thing is that they are going to appoint another one.

In 1896, she was still flagged as an anarchist and was subsequently included in a surveillance document listing missing and/or nomadic anarchists.

== Bibliography ==
- Bouhey, Vivien (2008), Les Anarchistes contre la République [The Anarchists against the Republic] (in French), Rennes: Presses universitaires de Rennes (PUR)
- Petit, Dominique (2024), SERROUIN Elvire, Arsène, épouse CHAUVEAU, Paris: Le Maitron
- Dupuy, Rolf; Petit, Dominique (2025), "SERROUIN, Arsène, Elvire [épouse CHAUVEAU]", Dictionnaire international des militants anarchistes, Paris
