= Jiroemon Kimura =

Japanese supercentenarian (1897–2013)

- 木村 次郎右衛門
- Born: Miyake Kinjiro (三宅 金治郎); 19 April 1897; Kamiukawa, Kyoto, Empire of Japan
- Died: 12 June 2013 (aged 116 years, 54 days); Kyōtango, Kyoto, Japan
- Known for: Oldest man ever recorded; Oldest living man (25 September 2011 – 12 June 2013); Oldest verified living person (17 December 2012 – 12 June 2013)
- Spouse: Yae Kimura (m. 1920; died 1979)
- Children: 8
- Military career
- Allegiance: Empire of Japan
- Branch: Imperial Japanese Army
- Service years: 1918–1921
- Conflicts: World War I

Jiroemon Kimura (Japanese: 木村 次郎右衛門, Hepburn: Kimura Jirōemon; 19 April 1897 – 12 June 2013) was a Japanese supercentenarian who was the verified oldest living person between Dina Manfredini's death on 17 December 2012 and his own death at age 116 years and 54 days on 12 June 2013. Kimura became the oldest verified living man in the world on 25 September 2011 at the age of 114, upon the death of Peru's Horacio Celi Mendoza, and later also the oldest man in history whose lifespan is verified on 28 December 2012, when he surpassed the age of Christian Mortensen (1882–1998). He is the only verified man who has lived to age 116, and one of only six men known to be the oldest living person.

After 113-year-old James Sisnett's death on 23 May 2013, Kimura was the last surviving man born in the 19th century.

== Family ==
According to records, Kimura, then named Kinjiro Miyake (三宅 金治郎, Miyake Kinjirō), was born on 19 April 1897 in the fishing village of Kamiukawa, in the Kyoto Prefecture of the Empire of Japan, as the fifth of eight children to farmers Morizo Miyake (1858–1935) and Fusa Miyake (1867–1931); Kinjiro had two elder sisters (born 1 November 1887 and 11 December 1889 respectively) and two elder brothers (born 21 March 1892 and 20 February 1895 respectively), of whom, however, only the second sister (who lived to the age of 96) and second brother (who died on 2 July 1986 aged 91) were alive at the time of Kinjiro's birth.

== Early life ==
=== Verifying birthdate ===
Kimura's age was further verified by researchers in an article that they published in 2017. After thorough research, including conducting family interviews and searching official records, the authors verified Kimura's age and date of birth. Kimura's nephew Tamotsu Miyake said his uncle's birthday was 19 March, but that this had been mistakenly recorded as 19 April in 1955 when records from neighbouring towns were consolidated and redone. The researchers concluded, however, that Kimura was listed as being born on 19 March 1897 (as opposed to 19 April 1897, his likely true birth date), on his school records due to his parents' desire to have him begin school a year earlier than his later birthday would have allowed, so that he could graduate from school earlier and begin working on the family farm. During this time in Japan, schoolchildren born before April were one school year ahead of schoolchildren who were born in April or afterwards.

=== Education and career ===
On 1 April 1903, Kimura (then Kinjiro Miyake) began his primary-school education. An intelligent student, he graduated with the equivalent of an eighth-grade education under the old imperial educational system on 31 March 1911, having had two additional years of schooling beyond what was then compulsory.

After leaving school at the age of 14 he worked for the post office, retiring more than fifty years later at the age of 65. He then went on to work as a farmer until he was 90.

== Career ==
On 10 April 1911, Miyake began work at the Nakahama post office as a telegraph boy while also working on his family's farm. He left the Nakahama post office on 2 February 1913. From May to December 1914, he studied at a posts and telegraph training school in Kyoto, graduating at the head of his class of 70 students and resuming work at the Nakahama post office on 4 December 1914.

== Military service ==
On 1 April 1918, Miyake was conscripted into the Imperial Japanese Army and was posted to Nakano, Tokyo, where he served with a communications unit. He was discharged from service on 30 June, was again conscripted on 1 September 1919 and was posted to Tokyo, but only served for three weeks until 21 September. On 23 May 1920, he left the Nakahama post office for the final time. To help support his second-youngest brother (1902–1987/1988) who had emigrated to Korea under Japanese rule for work and had fallen ill there, Miyake moved to Keijō (now Seoul, South Korea), taking a job on 31 May with the Government-General of Chōsen in the Mail and Telecommunications Department, with a salary of 30 yen plus a 30% overseas service allowance. He only stayed in Korea until November, however, before returning to Japan and his work on the farm.

From 1 to 21 September 1921, Kimura (formerly Miyake) underwent a final three-week period of army service, again in a communications unit, during which he was posted to Hiroshima. Around this time, he attended a ceremony in Kyoto to welcome the return to Japan of Crown Prince Hirohito from a tour of Europe. After his national service, Kimura resumed farming until 21 April 1924, when he was appointed a deputy postmaster at the Hira post office. He worked there for the next 38 years until his retirement on 30 June 1962, two months after his 65th birthday and having worked in post offices for 45 years.

== Marriage and family ==
On 27 December 1920, Kimura (then still Kinjiro Miyake) married his neighbour Yae Kimura (19 January 1904 – 30 May 1979), the adopted daughter of Jiroemon Kimura VIII and his wife K. Kimura (1870–1939). The marriage was officially registered two days later. Since his wife's family lacked a male heir, following her father's death in 1927, he changed his name to Jiroemon Kimura, becoming the ninth member of the family to bear that name. Jiroemon and Yae Kimura, who were married until Yae's death in 1979, had eight children born between 1922 and 1943, the second of whom, however, died in August 1927, shortly before his second birthday, and the youngest (born 8 December 1943) died on 31 August 1998 aged 54.

In 1978, Kimura and his wife moved in with their eldest son's family. After Yae's death in 1979, Kimura continued to live with his eldest son (12 May 1922 – 27 September 1998) and subsequently, after the eldest son's death in 1998, with one grandson (born 1952/1953) until his death in 2005, and then for the remainder of his life with the grandson's widow and, until January 2013, also the eldest son's widow (born 1929; she died in early 2013). Kimura had in total 14 grandchildren (of whom one grandson died in 2005), 25 great-grandchildren, and 13 great-great-grandchildren. At the age of 110, Kimura also had one living brother, Tetsuo (born 4 March 1909), who died on 2 June 2007 aged 98.

== Later years ==
After retiring, Kimura helped his eldest son run the family farm until he turned 90. He was health-conscious and active. He woke up early in the morning and read newspapers with a magnifying glass. He also enjoyed talking to guests and following live parliamentary debates on television. He credited eating small portions of food (hara hachi bun me) as the key to a long and healthy life.

=== Longevity ===
On 28 September 1999, aged 102, he appeared on a local television program featuring local residents noted for their longevity. On 17 June 2002, he published an autobiographical pamphlet, "Looking back at my happy 105 years." At the age of 114, upon Horacio Celi Mendoza's death, Kimura became the oldest living man in the world, after already being Japan's oldest living man since Tomoji Tanabe's death on 19 June 2009. On his 114th birthday on 19 April 2011, he mentioned his survival of the 7.6 magnitude 1927 Kita Tango earthquake that hit Kyoto and killed over 3,000 people. In October 2012, Kimura was presented with a certificate from Guinness World Records Editor-in-Chief Craig Glenday, relating to Kimura's appearance in the 2013 edition of Guinness World Records book; this was the second year in a row Kimura was recognized as the oldest living man in the world, as he also appeared in the book the year before. During the meeting, Kimura said he spent most of his time in bed. On his 116th and final birthday, Kimura received many well-wishes, including a video message from Japan's prime minister Shinzō Abe. On 23 May 2013, upon the death of 113-year-old Barbadian man James Sisnett, Kimura became the last living man born in the 19th century.

== Death ==
Kimura was admitted to hospital for pneumonia on 11 May 2013, from which he recovered. However, his health deteriorated in early June 2013, as his blood sugar level, urine production and response declined. Kimura died of natural causes in a hospital in his hometown of Kyōtango, western Japan, at 2:08 a.m. on 12 June 2013, and was succeeded as the world's oldest living man by Salustiano Sánchez (born 8 June 1901), and as the oldest living person by fellow Japanese citizen Misao Okawa.

== See also ==
- Jeanne Calment (1875–1997), the oldest person whose age was verified
- Kane Tanaka (1903–2022), the oldest Japanese person whose age was verified
- Shigechiyo Izumi (died 1986), a Japanese man who was erroneously verified as the oldest man aged 120
- List of the oldest people by country
- List of the verified oldest people
- List of last surviving World War I veterans
- List of Japanese supercentenarians
- Elderly people in Japan
