= Christina von Stommeln =

Roman Catholic mystic and stigmatic (1242–1312)

Blessed Christina von Stommeln
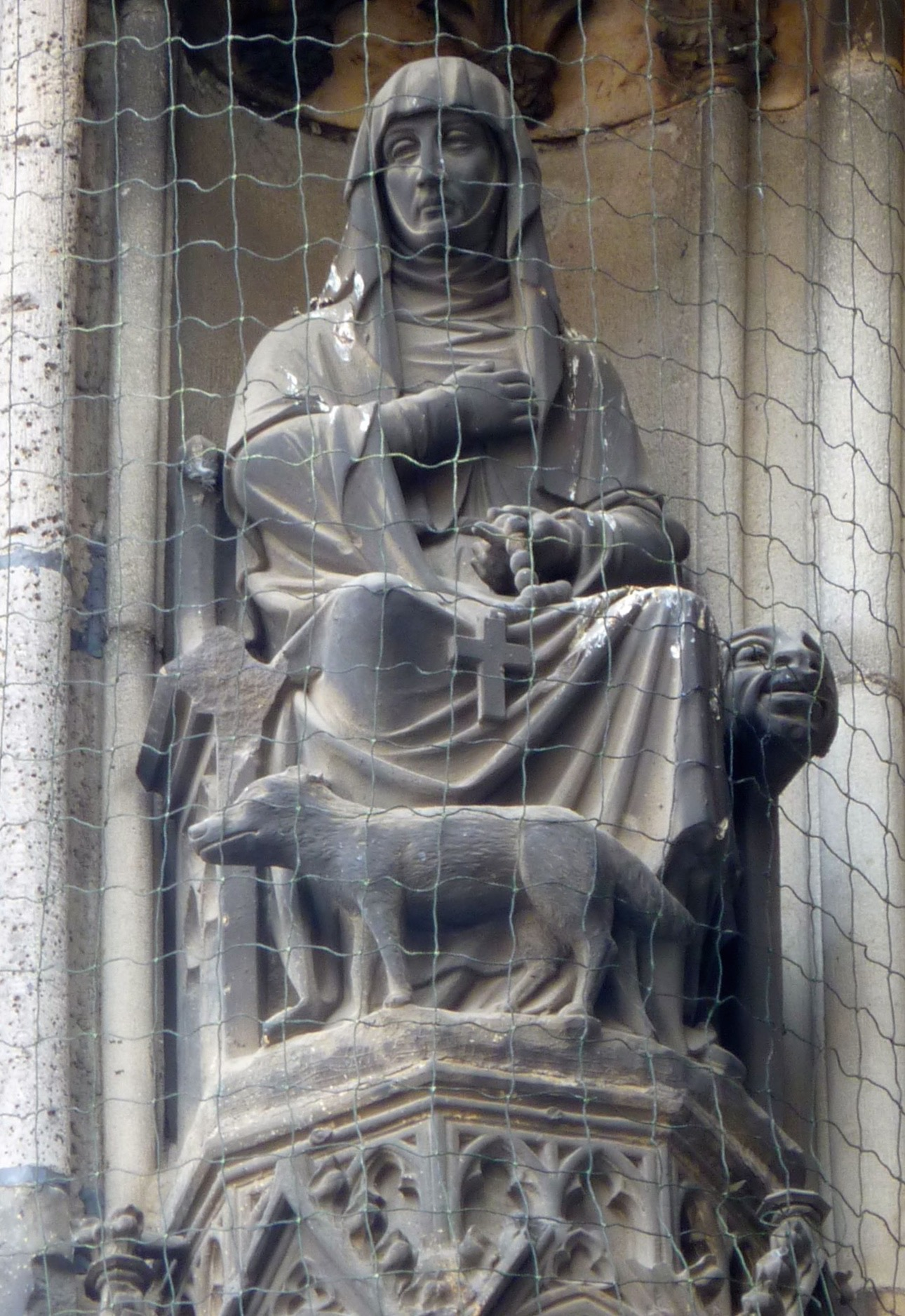
- Statue of Christina von Stommeln (northern portal Cologne Cathedral)

Religious; Mystic
- Born: 24 July 1242; Stommeln, Germany
- Died: 6 November 1312 (aged 70); Stommeln, Germany
- Venerated in: Roman Catholic Church
- Beatified: 8 November 1908, Saint Peter's Basilica, Kingdom of Italy by Pope Pius X
- Major shrine: Jülich
- Feast: 6 November
- Attributes: Religious habit

Christina of Stommeln (24 July 1242 – 6 November 1312), also known as Christina Bruso and Christina Bruzo, was a Roman Catholic mystic, ecstatic, and stigmatic.

Christina is believed to have been born on July 24, 1242, to farmers Heinrich and Hilla Bruso in the village of Stumbeln (now Stommeln), northwest of Cologne. At the age of five, she began to experience religious visions. At ten, she had a dream in which Christ told her that she would live with Beguines. When she was twelve her parents wished to arrange her marriage, but she left home without their permission and joined a Beguine community in Cologne. At the age of fifteen, she manifested stigmata on her hands, feet, and head. This, combined with other mystic experiences, convinced others in the community that she was insane and she was treated with contempt, leading her to return to her home village in 1267.

On her return to Stommeln, she was taken in by the parish priest, Johannes. While in his care, Christina met Peter of Dacia, a Dominican, who became a lifelong friend. Following Peter's death in 1288, Christine's mystic experiences ceased. She left the priest's household and moved into a small cloister, where she lived a quiet life until her death at the age of 70 on November 6, 1312. She was first buried in the Stommeln churchyard, but her remains have been moved several times: first into the church, then in 1342 to Nideggen, and finally in 1569 to the Propsteikirche (Provost's Church) in Jülich, where a monument to Christine still exists. Her relics survived the destruction of the Provost's Church during the Allies' air raid on Jülich on November 16, 1944.

Pope Pius X beatified her on 8 November 1908 and her liturgical feast was affixed to the date of her death.

== See also ==
- Saints and levitation
