= Gyrovague anarchists =

Group of anarchists characterized by great mobility

Towns serving as relay points and contact hubs for companions along the Franco-Swiss-Italian border (1890s).

Gyrovague anarchists or gyrovague companions are a historiographical concept developed by the historian Vivien Bouhey in 2008 to name a specific type of anarchists, at least for the Belle Époque period (1880–1914), characterized by great mobility.

Born into a situation of harsh repression and companionship, these anarchists distinguished themselves from other militants by their propensity or capacity to move, taking on a role of liaison agents within the movement, establishing links between several individuals, groups, territories, and spaces. They could be figures of the movement, such as Louise Michel, who gave series of lectures in France, companions undertaking occasional or frequent trips, others who might have local roots in certain cities, or finally certain specific demographics of the movement who might adopt a nomadic lifestyle, such as beggars, criminals, or sex workers.

According to the historian, the existence and travels of these companions are among the main factors in the coordination of the anarchist movement during this period, as they could perform the work of 'passers' and thus unify groups in their thought and action.

== Terminology ==
The term gyrovague originates from religious language used to designate nomadic monks who traveled from one monastery to another without a fixed location. The term is derived from both the Greek γῦρος (gyros), meaning circle, and the Latin văgor, meaning to wander, so literally, 'those who wander in circles'.

This terminology, used to describe a certain type of anarchist, at least during the Belle Époque (1880–1914), was established by the historian Vivien Bouhey in his work Les anarchistes contre la République (2008).

== History ==
=== Context: significant repression fostering anarchist mobility ===
During the 1870s, and even more so from the 1880s onward, repression of anarchists increased in nearly all states facing the growth of anarchist numbers within their borders. This situation was not specific to France but affected other bordering regions or those with similar dynamics: anarchists were thus subjected to significant repression.

These factors caused the destabilization and disappearance of the movement's original structures; the Anti-Authoritarian International and the subsequent Black International vanished during the 1880s, and many anarchists took the path of exile. The movement turned inward to escape repression, and the period saw the emergence of a new system of relations among anarchists: companionship. Reflecting on these issues, Bouhey writes:

The repression affecting anarchist circles in various countries during the 1890s contributed to the multiplication of these contacts, as it induced, on one hand, the flight of prosecuted companions across their respective countries or abroad, a flight often requiring complicity and meetings with other companions or outlaws, and, on the other hand, the expulsion of foreign anarchists arrested on French soil.

=== Gyrovague anarchists ===
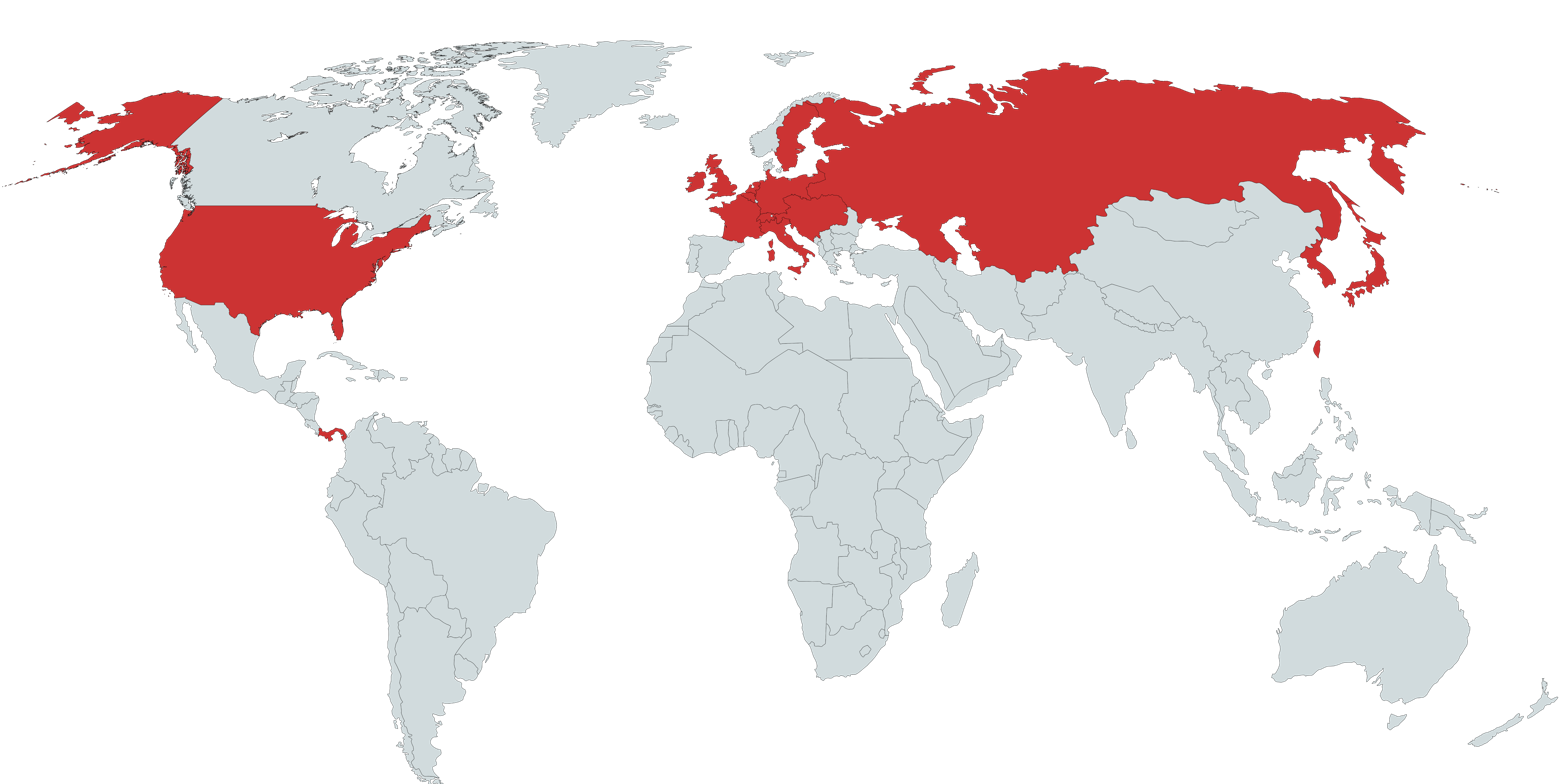
Countries visited by Mikhail Bakunin (1814-1876), one of the main founders of anarchism, showing a propensity to travel already

Within the framework of this repression, which triggered significant anarchist mobility, and the system of companionship, Bouhey uses this terminology to designate a new type of anarchist. He uses the term to describe companions characterized by high geographical mobility.

Some of these gyrovagues moved under exceptional circumstances through occasional trips; for example, when sent to spread propaganda in a region and establish networks there. This was the case for the companion Justin Cazenave, who in 1892 traveled from Lausanne to Saint-Étienne, where he held discussions with local anarchists before returning to Lyon to have a manifesto printed, only to be spotted shortly after in Valence, asking a Parisian anarchist to forward his mail to Marseille.

Others maintained multiple local anchors over a long period, moving, for instance, between two cities to which they were tied. These companions could maintain contacts and conduct activities in several parallel locations simultaneously. The brothers Jacques and Geoffroy Pflug, for example, originally from Troyes and serving in the 37th Infantry Regiment in Nancy in 1891, formed a bond with the companion Paul Serrure, allowing them to maintain contacts and activities in Nancy even after their departure.

Finally, others were far more mobile and characterized by their inherent propensity to travel. One such individual was the companion Meunier, who came from Angers and 'preached anarchy from town to town in the Southwest before settling [in Brest]'. This last category covers both major figures who engaged in public lecture tours across France and even other countries, such as Louise Michel, and exiles forced to move to escape repression. It also includes other social classes, such as beggars, criminals, or sex workers, who also tended to move and be pushed toward nomadic lifestyles.

== Legacy ==
=== A major role in coordination and unification within the anarchist movement ===
For Bouhey, whose thesis maintains that the anarchist movement, at least during the Belle Époque period (1880–1914) he examines, was a 'highly structured and organized' movement rather than a motley collection of isolated individuals, the gyrovagues form a central point of his analysis. He emphasizes that these links and contacts played a significant unifying role within the anarchist movement, allowing distant groups to harmonize. In his view, they were truly 'liaison agents', in his own words, who coordinated group actions, transmitted elements from one group to another, and wove multiple local networks that ensured the movement's survival and propagation. Ultimately, through their travels, they both traversed and deeply penetrated European territory.

In presenting his conclusion, the historian includes them in his list of nine factors that enabled the unification and coordination of the anarchist movement, at least during this period. He writes:

These individuals or groups did not live in isolation from one another as has been written until now. On the contrary, they were generally in permanent contact, and this in several ways.

1. Thanks to militants who, because they belonged to different groups at the same time, contributed to coordinating their action. [...] 6. Thanks to leagues, which, at the local, regional, or national level, federate a certain number of groupings; 7. Thanks to a minority of 'gyrovague companions,' who acted as liaison agents by transmitting news from one group to another. 8. Thanks also to epistolary networks, which covered the national territory. 9. Thanks to newspapers, which collected funds and published all kinds of information relating to individuals, groups, or the actions undertaken by these same groupings, though their role in the anarchist 'organization' must nevertheless be put into perspective.

== Bibliography ==
- Berthoud, Joël (1969). L'attentat contre Carnot et ses rapports avec le mouvement anarchiste des années 90 (mémoire) [The attack on Carnot and it's relationship with the anarchist movement of the 1890s (memory)] (PDF) (in French).
- Bouhey, Vivien (2008), Les Anarchistes contre la République [The Anarchists against the Republic] (in French), Rennes: Presses universitaires de Rennes (PUR)
- Merriman, John M. (2016). The dynamite club: how a bombing in fin-de-siècle Paris ignited the age of modern terror. Yale University Press. ISBN 978-0-300-21792-6.
