= French anarchist leagues =

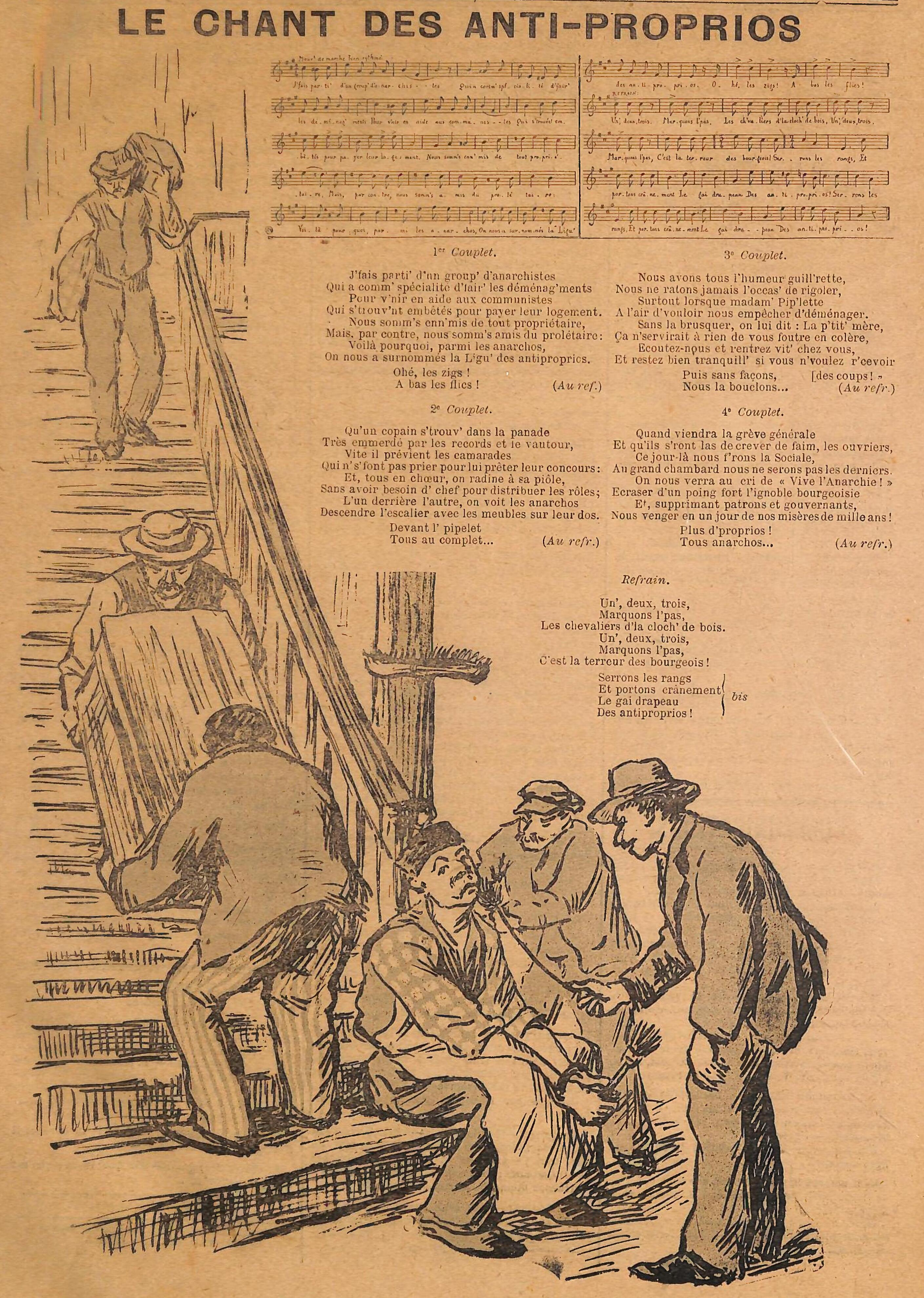
The Chant des antiproprios, anthem of the Ligue des Anti-propriétaires, in Le Père Peinard of 23 May 1893

The French anarchist leagues were a group of at least two leagues, the Ligue des antipatriotes and the Ligue des Anti-propriétaires, founded in France in 1886 in reaction to the creation of the Ligue des Patriotes.

The two organizations, which often brought together the same individuals and were primarily based in Paris, engaged in a variety of tactics ranging from legal antimilitarist propaganda to activities such as the widespread promotion of déménagement à la cloche de bois, an illegalist practice considered a forerunner of modern squatting.

These leagues, to which other groups like the Cercle international could be added, helped reunify the anarchist movement in France after the destruction of its structures caused by the repression of 1883. They remained active until the 1890s.

== History ==
=== Context ===
The anarchist movement emerged around the Saint-Imier Congress (1872) before spreading widely. Initially, anarchists were gathered within the Anti-Authoritarian International, which evolved into the Black International in the early 1880s.

This organization disappeared during the 1880s, as did the first anarchist federations in France, which gravitated around Lyon and the Rhône, dissolved by the anarchists themselves to evade the repression of 1883. This left French anarchists without structures capable of uniting them beyond local groups. However, this situation did not last long; as early as 1883, authorities noticed that anarchists were once again coordinating between groups in a fairly uniform manner, despite the suppression of the federations. They thus initiated anarchist companionship.

=== French anarchist leagues ===
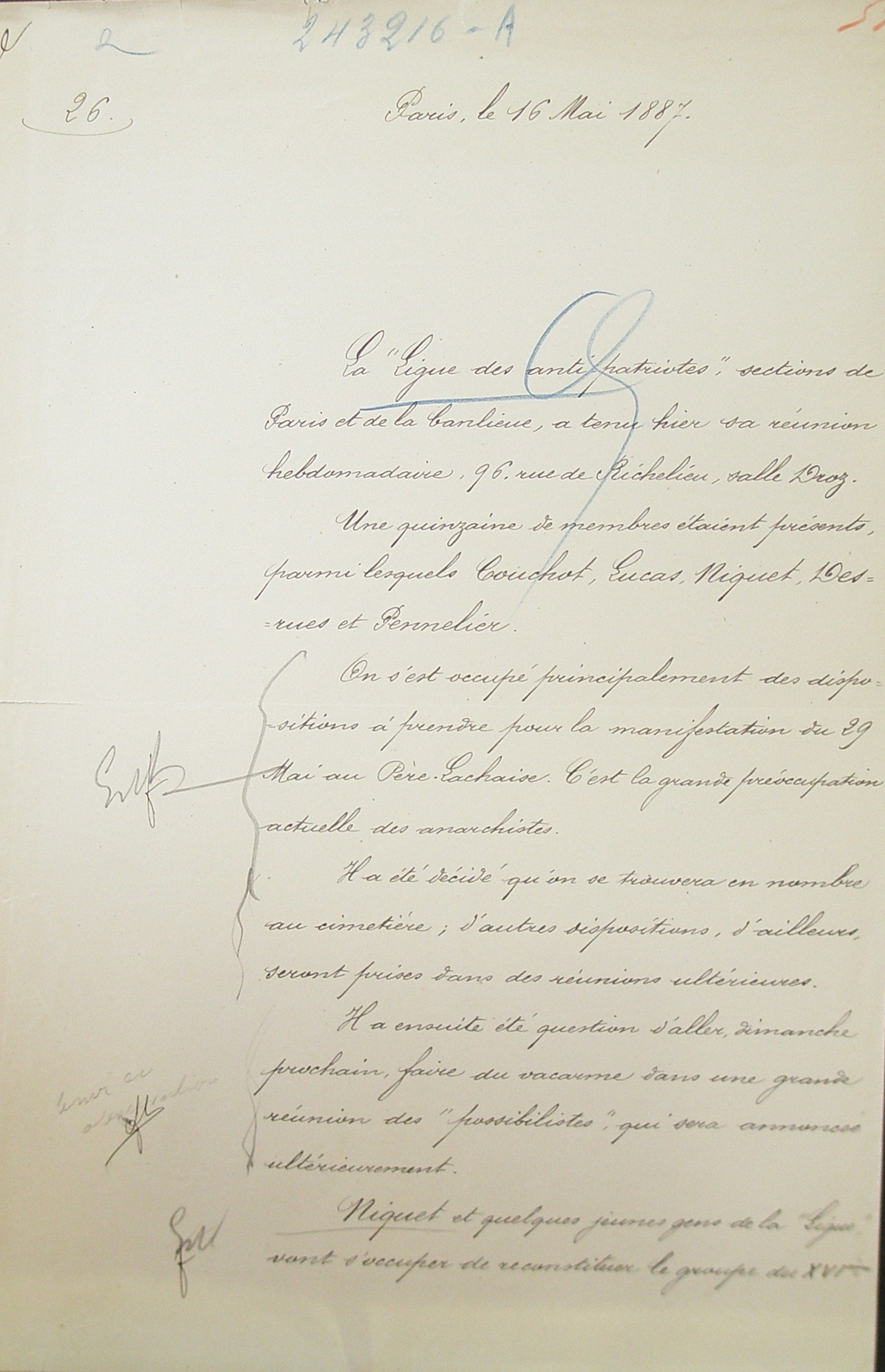
Police report on the Ligue des antipatriotes (collection of Archives Anarchistes)

As the movement's primary center in France gradually shifted from Lyon to Paris, anarchists in the capital and its surrounding areas launched several leagues. The first of these, the Ligue des antipatriotes (English: Anti-Patriot League), was founded in August 1886 by the Anarchist Youth of Belleville group.

This organization was established to counteract the recently founded Ligue des Patriotes and to carry out anti-patriotic and antimilitarist propaganda. While mostly active around Paris, it could also operate in other areas and was composed of numerous pre-existing anarchist groups that chose to join it. The founders' plan was to subdivide the league into sections corresponding to each of Paris's twenty arrondissements. In 1886, the league notably published a Manifesto to Conscripts, which it successfully distributed both across the country and abroad.

Four months later, in December, Jean Couchot founded the Ligue des Anti-propriétaires (English: Anti-Landlords/Owners League), a parallel organization that frequently brought together the exact same people. According to historian Jean Maitron, it operated without any regulations, bylaws, or official headquarters, engaging primarily in the illegalist practice of déménagement à la cloche de bois. This practice, which Couchot was already practicing prior to founding the organization, consisted of discreetly moving out tenants who were defaulting on their rent. It is considered one of the early methods foreshadowing modern squatting.

In the vast majority of cases, these moves were carried out silently and peacefully during the night. However, conflicts occasionally erupted during the process between concierges or police officers and the anarchists vacating the premises. For instance, in 1887, Paolo Chiericotti and two other Italian anarchists clashed with their landlord while attempting a move. Following the landlord's subsequent complaint and the conviction of one of the three men, the landlord's business was targeted in a nighttime bombing. According to the police, the antipropriétaires gathered primarily as rent deadlines approached, offering their assistance to interested parties to carry out these déménagements à la cloche de bois. They were also reportedly supported by the Chambre syndicale des hommes de peine (English: Laborers' Trade Union), a number of whose members were also affiliated with both leagues.

== Legacy ==
=== Role of coordination and unification of the movement ===
These leagues, which were active between the late 1880s and the early 1890s, are to be understood in relation to other organizations or groups active during this period, such as the Cercle international of Paris, in their capacity to bring together different local groups and contribute to unifying both the actions and thought of anarchists in France.

Historian Vivien Bouhey included them in his list of core elements explaining the movement's coordination during this period, writing on the subject:

These individuals or groups do not live isolated from one another, contrary to what has been written until now. Quite the opposite, they are generally in permanent contact, and this in several ways: [...] 5. Thanks to prisoner aid funds, which, on a local, national, or even international scale, foster mutual aid among comrades; 6. Thanks to leagues, which, at the local, regional, or national level, federate a certain number of groupings; 7. Thanks to a minority of gyrovague companions, who serve as liaison agents by transmitting news from one group to another; [...]

== Bibliography ==
- Bouhey, Vivien (2008), Les Anarchistes contre la République [The Anarchists against the Republic] (in French), Rennes: Presses universitaires de Rennes (PUR)
- Davranche, Guillaume; Petit, Dominique (2024), "CHIERICOTTI Paul [Pierre, Paul, Jacques, dit ; aussi Chericotti, Ricotti, Paul LAURENT", Dictionnaire des anarchistes (Le Maitron), Paris: Le Maitron des anarchistes
- Maitron, Jean (1955), Histoire du mouvement anarchiste en France (1800-1914) (in French), Paris: Histoire du mouvement anarchiste en France, 1880-1914
- Péchu, Cécile (2010), Les squats [Squats], Contester, Paris: Presses de Sciences Po (PSP), doi:10.3917/scpo.pechu.2010.01, ISBN 978-2-7246-1169-4
