= Jenny Pike =

Canadian photographer and servicewoman

- Born: Jenny Whitehead; July 23, 1922; Winnipeg, Manitoba, Canada
- Died: April 19, 2004 (aged 81)
- Occupations: Photographer, WWII navy servicewoman, darkroom technician

Jenny Pike (née Whitehead; July 23, 1922 – April 19, 2004) was a Canadian photographer and servicewoman. She worked in London during WWII, and was the only female photographer to help develop the first photos of the D-Day landings. After the war, she worked as a darkroom technician for the police in Victoria, British Columbia.

== Early life ==
Jenny Whitehead was born July 23, 1922 in Winnipeg, Manitoba. She had three older siblings. Whitehead discovered an interest in photography as a child, learning to develop film by age eleven, and she enjoyed assisting her older brother in his photography lab. When she was older she found a job in the photography department of Eaton's.

== Career and marriage ==
In early 1943, Whitehead offered her services as a photographer to the Royal Canadian Navy, and in February she was accepted as a probationary recruit in the Women's Royal Canadian Naval Service. Her father supported her and helped her write letters to apply for the job. His act of support was not the norm for the time. In August, Whitehead took a photography training course in Ottawa, and was one of only seven female recruits in the class.

In February 1944, Whitehead was sent to London, England. When the D-Day invasions began, Whitehead helped develop the first incoming photos from the D-Day landings. She was the only female photographer in the darkroom team. She went home to Canada in April 1945, and was granted an honorable discharge from the army in January 1946, having achieved the rank of petty officer.

After the war, Whitehead married Donovan Pike, a childhood friend and navy officer. They lived in Victoria, British Columbia, and the couple had two children. Jenny Pike was a member of the Winnipeg Royal Canadian Legion in the late 1940s, and later joined the Ex-Service Women's Branch 182 in Victoria.

In 1969, Pike started working for the Victoria City Police Identification Unit as a darkroom technician, finally retiring in 1983. She continued taking pictures as an amateur photographer for many years afterwards. In the early 1980s, Pike worked as a film crew member on The Glitter Dome, providing photography and also appearing as an extra in the film.

== Death ==
Pike died on April 19, 2004.
