= Thomas Bastard =

The Reverend Thomas Bastard (1565/1566 – April 19, 1618) was an English clergyman famed for his published English language epigrams.

== Life ==
Born in Blandford Forum, Dorset, England, Bastard is best known for seven books of 285 epigrams entitled Chrestoleros published in 1598.

He initially attended Winchester College. Subsequently he began studying at New College, Oxford, on 27 August 1586. By 1588, he was assigned as a perpetual Fellow of New College. Though later expelled from his Fellowship, Bastard still received a BA in 1590, and an MA 16 years later in 1606.

Bastard became notorious for libeling the sexual doings of various Oxford clergy and academics via a published tract entitled An Admonition to the city of Oxford, &c. Despite disavowing authorship, he was nonetheless expelled from his Oxford fellowship in 1591.

He still maintained a few supporters and admirers, primarily, Sir Charles Blount, Lord Mountjoy who appointed him as a chaplain, and Thomas Howard, 1st Earl of Suffolk who appointed him vicar of Bere Regis and later, in 1606, Rector of Almer in Dorset.

Bastard was married three times. He died impoverished in the debtor's prison at Allhallows parish, Dorchester, and was buried in parish churchyard.

== Death ==
Prior to Bastard's death, admirer Sir John Harrington said in a poem:

"To Master Bastard, a minister, that made a pleasant Book of English Epigrams:

You must in pulpit treat of matters serious;
As it beseems the person and the place;
There preach of faith, repentance, hope, and grace;
Of sacraments, and such high things mysterious:
But they are too severe, and too imperious,
That unto honest sports will grant no space.
For these our minds refresh, those weary us,
And spur out doubled spirit to swifter pace."

== Sources ==
- "Bastard, Thomas" in S. Austin Allibone. A Critical Dictionary of English Literature and British and American Authors Living and Deceased from the Earliest Accounts to the Latter Half of the Nineteenth Century. J.B. Lippincott Company, Philadelphia, London, c1886, vol. 1, p. 139. (OCLC 12491596) (Full-text at Internet Archive)
- "Bastard, Thomas" in Oxford Dictionary of National Biography in Association with the British Academy: from the Earliest Times to the Year 2000. Oxford University Press, Oxford (England), New York, c2004, p. 281 (ISBN 0-19-861411-X), (OCLC 56655031)
