= Samuel C. Morrison Jr. =

Liberian screenwriter, director, producer and journalist

Samuel Calvin Morrison Jr.
- Born: Monrovia, Liberia
- Occupations: Entrepreneur, filmmaker, journalist
- Years active: 2011–present
- Spouse: Cheryl L. Morrison (m. 2016)
- Website: www.deckofcardsent.com

Samuel C. Morrison Jr. is a Liberian-born screenwriter, director, producer and journalist.

== Career ==
Morrison started in the entertainment industry by interning in the promotions department at Def Jam Recordings and working in the A&R department for TVT Records before moving to writing and story-telling. After being hired to ghost write a couple of screenplays, he formed Deck of Cards Entertainment Media.

In January 2012, Morrison was featured on Hot 97's Street Soldiers along with Tuskegee Airmen Dr. Roscoe Brown Jr., actor Terrence Howard, Red Tails director Anthony Hemingway and actor-producer Casper Martinez. The interview was conducted by radio host and journalist Lisa Evers and dealt with the lack of minority influence in Hollywood.

In addition to writing two episodes for TV One's Love That Girl! starring Tatyana Ali, Morrison served as a writer and producer for HuffPost's BV365, an entertainment news show that focused on black entertainment. Morrison also returned to The Source Magazine in January 2014.

Morrison produced the independent psychological thriller, By Deception, based on a screenplay he wrote. By Deception premiered November 2022 on the Peacock streaming network.

== Personal life ==
=== Activism ===
In 2014, after Jersey City Officer Melvin Santiago was murdered in the line of duty, Samuel penned an open letter to Jersey City residents, in which he pleaded for unity and prosperity.

== Filmography ==
Year	Title	Credit(s)
2009	Life is Serius (short film)	Writer
2011	Love That Girl!	Writer
2012	HuffPost's BV 365	Producer, writer
2013	Autograph: Bridget Kelly (documentary music series)	Creator, Producer
2013	Re:Introducing (documentary music series)	Creator, Producer
2013	Be Mine (short film)	Writer
2014	Raw (short film)	Producer
2015	The Mint	Writer
2022	By Deception	Producer, writer
