= Lu Chao-Hsuan =

Taiwanese guitarist (1929-2017)

Lu Chao-Hsuan Chinese: 吕昭炫; pinyin: Lǚ Zhāoxuàn (6 November 1929 - 19 April 2017) was a guitar composer, performer and educator. He was born in Guishan District, Taoyuan and attended the 21st International Guitarist Symposium in Japan in 1962, where he performed “Hometown” and “Willow,” which later became his representative works. In 2000, he was appointed as an honorary consultant of the Taiwan Guitar Society and has become a highly representative figure in the field of guitar in Taiwan.

== Life ==
Lu Chao-Hsuan was born in Guishan, Taoyuan in 1929, and his family moved to Taipei when he was five. He began self-studying guitar in 1945 and started teaching guitar performance in 1948. In the same year, he published his first work “Late Spring Flower.” In 1962, he was invited to Tokyo, Japan to attend the 21st International Guitarist Symposium and performed “Hometown” and “Willow,” which have become two of his representative works. In 1966, his piece “Melancholy” was selected as the opening theme of the movie Outside the Window. Besides, Lu also composed commercial songs, and his varied repertoire came to increase his popularity

== Career ==
Throughout his career, Lu Chao-Hsuan remained active in composing, performing in concerts, and teaching guitar. In 2000, he was appointed as an honorary consultant of Taiwan Guitar Association. In 2001, his album Sunset by Riverbank: Taiwanese Guitar Poet Lu Chao-Hsuan Guitar Collection was nominated for the best classical music album at the Golden Melody Awards in the traditional and art music category. In 2005, he was included in the personages page of Enciclopedia de la guitarra (the Spanish guitar encyclopedia), becoming the first Taiwanese guitarist to be introduced in this encyclopedia.

Following his death in 2017, Evergreen Symphony Orchestra performed 'Song of Nature, Chant of Memory: Taiwan's Guitar Poet Lu Chao-Hsuan Guitar Works' at the National Theater and Concert Hall, Taipei in the next year to fulfil his wish to present his works with different music arrangements.

On November 26, 2022, the Taiwan Music Institute of the National Center for Traditional Arts held a memorial concert.
