= Joseph Tortelier =

French anarchist

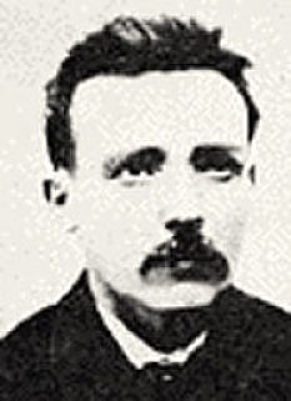
- Born: February 12, 1854; Bain-de-Bretagne
- Died: December 1, 1925 (aged 71); Eaubonne
- Occupation: Carpenter
- Known for: Anarchist activism

Joseph Tortelier (1854–1925) was a carpenter, labor activist, and anarchist who advocated for the general strike and consumption based on need.

== Biography ==
In March 1891, he was scheduled to participate in an anarchist meeting in Saint-Denis as one of three planned speakers - Faure and Martinet were also set to speak, but he canceled his participation at the last minute.

== Works about Tortelier ==
=== Police sources ===
Collection from the archive-site Archives Anarchistes published on Commons and including:

- 5 U 312-2 at the Archives départementales de l'Aube (71 pages concerning his trial of 1889 for insulting police officers).
