= Kane Tanaka =

Japanese supercentenarian (1903–2022)

- 田中カ𛄧
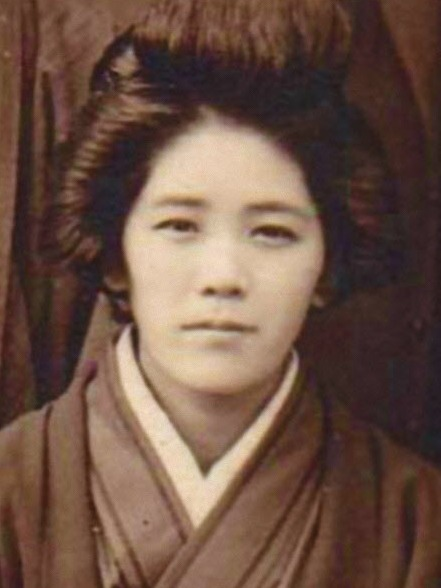
- Tanaka, c. 1923
- Born: Kane Ōta; 2 January 1903; Wajiro Village, Fukuoka, Empire of Japan
- Died: 19 April 2022 (aged 119 years, 107 days); Fukuoka, Japan
- Occupation: Store owner
- Known for: Oldest known living person (22 July 2018 – 19 April 2022); Oldest verified Japanese person ever; Second-oldest verified person ever
- Spouse: Hideo Tanaka (m. 1922; died 1993)
- Children: 5

Kane Tanaka (田中 カ𛄧, Tanaka Kane; née Ōta (太田); 2 January 1903 – 19 April 2022) was a Japanese supercentenarian who, until her death at the age of 119 years, 107 days, was the world's oldest verified living person, following the death of Chiyo Miyako on 22 July 2018. She is the oldest verified Japanese person and the second-oldest verified person ever, after Jeanne Calment.

== Personal life ==
Tanaka was born as Kane Ota (太田 カ𛄧, Ōta Kane) on 2 January 1903 in the village of Wajiro (now part of Higashi-ku, Fukuoka), on the southern island of Kyushu, the third daughter and seventh child of Kumayoshi and Kuma Ota. Kane and her family said she was actually born on 26 December 1902 and that her parents delayed the process of filing the report for a week because they were not sure if she would survive as she was born prematurely.

Kane's early childhood was during the last years of the Meiji period, which ended in 1912 when she was nine. Kane married her cousin Hideo Tanaka in 1922, with whom she had two sons and two daughters. The couple also adopted their niece, the second daughter of Hideo's sister. Kane's eldest daughter died shortly after birth and her second daughter died at the age of one in 1947, while her adoptive daughter died in 1945 at the age of 23 of an unspecified illness. The couple worked in a store selling shiruko and udon noodles.

Kane's husband was later drafted into the military, where he served from 1937 to 1939; one of her sons was captured towards the end of World War II as a military POW and was held captive in Siberia before being released and returning home in 1947. After World War II, the couple continued working in the store, with Kane converting to Christianity under the ministry of pastors stationed by the United States military. Retiring from working at their store at 63, Kane travelled to the United States in the 1970s to visit her relatives in California and Colorado. Her husband died in 1993 at the age of 90 after 71 years of marriage.

Kane lived in a nursing home in Higashi-Ku, Fukuoka from September 2018, and she was reportedly still in good health on her 118th birthday. Tanaka was supposed to hold the Olympic torch at the 2020 Summer Olympics, but she withdrew from it due to concerns regarding an increase in COVID-19 cases in Japan. She occasionally played the board game Othello, and took short walks in the nursing home's hallways. Her hobbies included calligraphy and solving arithmetic problems. She had five grandchildren and eight great-grandchildren. Tanaka died in a hospital in Fukuoka on 19 April 2022, shortly after being verified as the second-oldest person to have lived. Her death was announced on 25 April 2022. No cause of death was given, but her grandson said she had been feeling ill since late 2021, according to the Japanese Health Ministry.

== Health and longevity ==
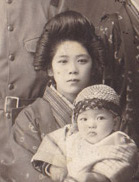
Kane Tanaka c. 1920s

Tanaka had several major illnesses and was infected with paratyphoid fever with her adopted daughter at the age of 35. She underwent pancreatic cancer surgery at the age of 45. In 2006, Tanaka was diagnosed with colorectal cancer and underwent surgery when she was 103 years old. Her life and longevity were noted by her second son and his wife four years later when they published a book called In Good and Bad Times, 107 Years Old. At the age of 114, she was interviewed by KBC in September 2017. On 9 March 2019, Tanaka was officially presented with the "World's Oldest Living Person" and "World's Oldest Living Woman" titles by Guinness World Records, verifying her longevity claim. On 19 September 2020, she broke the record of longest-lived Japanese person, as well as the third-oldest person in the world, after surpassing Nabi Tajima's age of 117 years, 260 days. On 10 April 2022, she surpassed the lifespan of Sarah Knauss to become the second-oldest verified person.

Tanaka had said that she wanted to live to the age of 120, crediting her faith in God, family, sleep, hope, eating good food and practicing mathematics for her longevity. Her longevity, along with that of Jeanne Calment, has contributed to the debate that the maximum lifespan for humans could be 115–125 years. After Tanaka's death, Frenchwoman Lucile Randon became the world's oldest validated living person.

== See also ==
- Oldest people
- Jiroemon Kimura, the longest-lived man ever
