= Cities Alliance =

Global development partnership

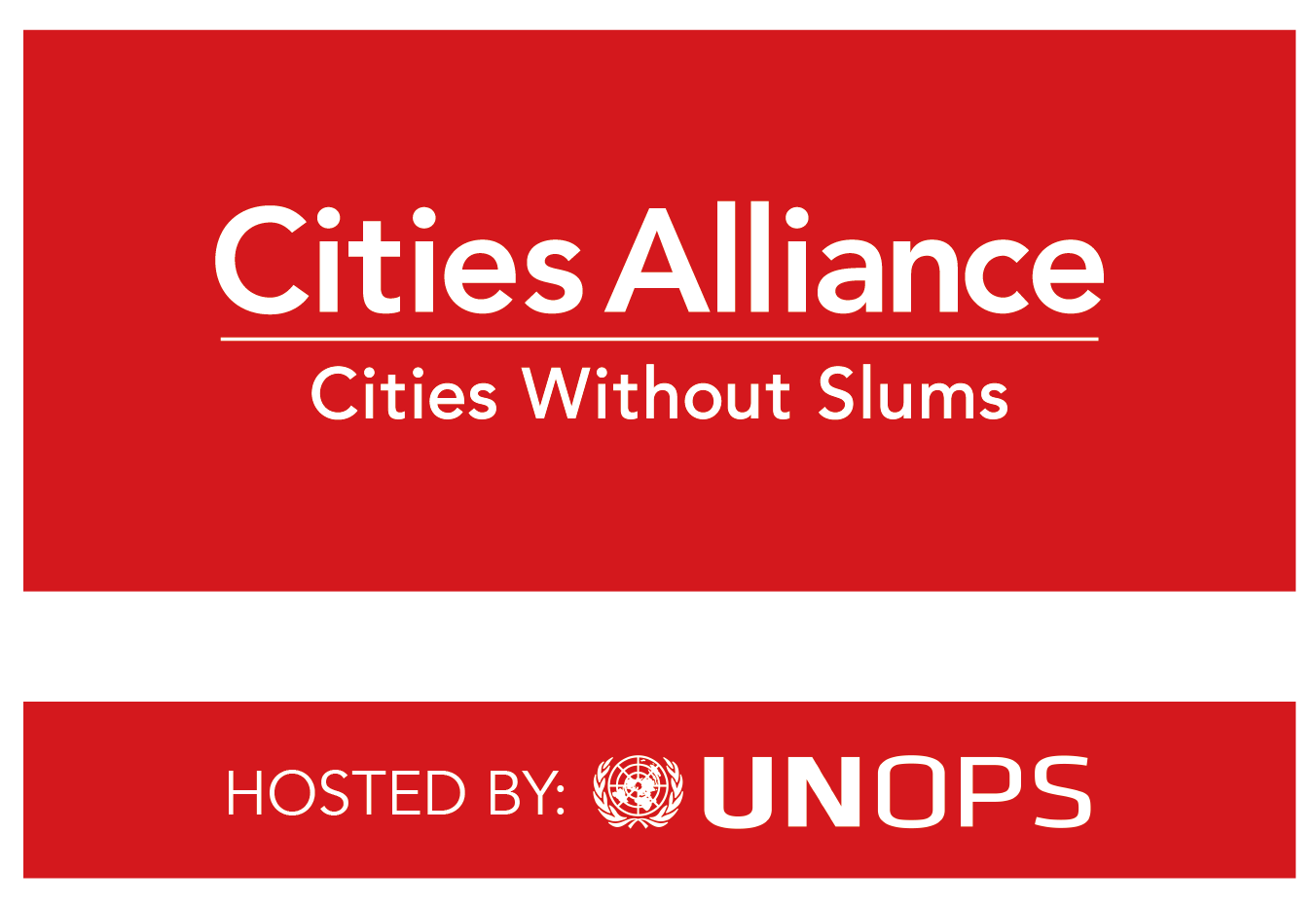
- Founded: May 1999
- Type: Global Partnership
- Legal status: Active
- Headquarters: Brussels, Belgium
- Leader: Dr Greg Munro, Director
- Website: www.citiesalliance.org

Cities Alliance is a global partnership fighting urban poverty and supporting cities to deliver sustainable development. To manage its activities, the Cities Alliance operates a multi-donor fund with UN Office for Project Services (UNOPS), as host and trustee. Different members provide direction, financing and advocacy. Cities Alliance aims to deliver solutions to urban poverty.

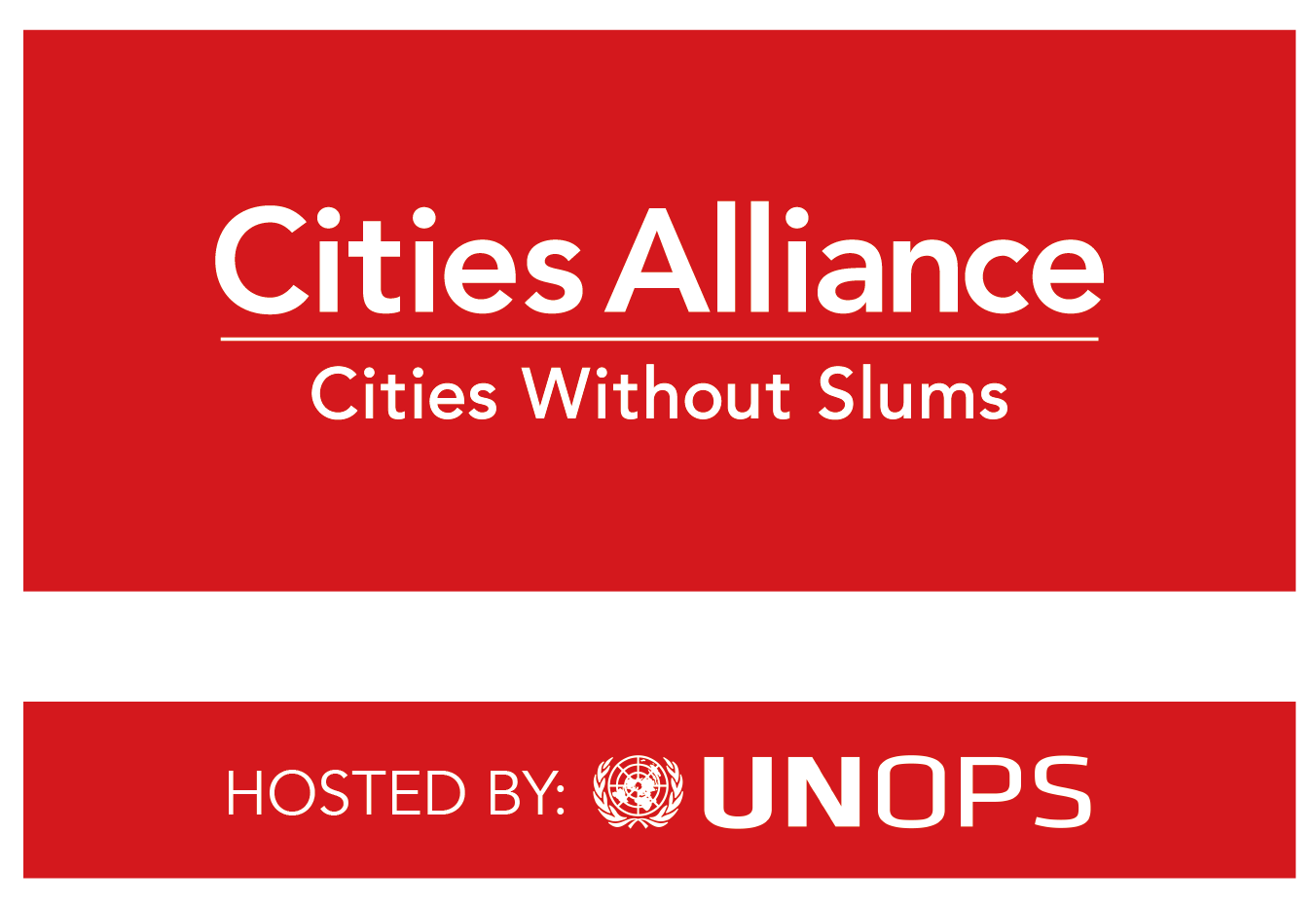

== Overview ==
Founded in 1999 at the conclusion of the International Mayors Summit, the Cities Alliance's initial members were bilateral aid agencies from the US, Japan, Germany, the UK, and Canada, in addition to four associations of local authorities. From its inception, the Cities Alliance has been clear in its intention to exclusively "fund partnership-efforts of multiple stakeholders", with the intention of engendering cooperation across the government, NGO, international organization, and citizen advocacy divides to support active local governance, citizenship, and economic growth These efforts implicate "regional staff members in Africa, Asia, and Latin America".

The Cities Alliance has additionally "made transparency and access to information an important aspect of its decision-making process" in accordance with principle five of the Paris Declaration on Aid Effectiveness. This is one of several ways in which the Cities Alliance is in line with current thinking on the subject. Through their country programmes, for instance, they are strengthening "a framework to enhance cooperation between urban stakeholders, and public and private investments in urban communities", echoing the Paris Declaration's themes of harmonisation, alignment, and ownership.

In addition to grant distribution and monitoring efforts, the Cities Alliance also serves as "a medium for information and experience sharing between various local governments", to encourage the development of best practices in urban planning, mapping, and service delivery, with knowledge exchanges taking place in various fora. It was this same coordinating function that prompted the Cities Alliance Secretariat's location, first in Washington DC and then in Brussels, in order "to encourage close coordination between the technical assistance role to be promoted by the Cities Alliance" with the larger "urban project lending" function. This move, from Washington DC to Brussels in 2013, corresponded with the departure of the Cities Alliance from the World Bank, at which point it fell under the auspices of the UN Office for Project Services (UNOPS), following a "partnership-driven selection process" to make it their secretariat and trustee.

== Practices ==
The basic practices of the Cities Alliance were outlined in their 2003 annual report, calling for "an attack on urban poverty by focusing on two areas: city development strategy (CDS), and citywide and nationwide squatter settlement upgrading". This has since expanded to include other modalities but still forms the bedrock of Cities Alliance, which focuses on "the city and its region rather than on sectors", making it relatively unusual.

=== City Development Strategies ===
City Development Strategies (CDS) are positioned "as a mechanism to create a shared vision of the city's future among all stakeholders". They are "based on an assessment of each city's economic growth prospects and are aimed at enhancing its competitiveness" and focus on "improved urban governance, fiscal responsibility and the establishment for clear priorities for action and investment". One prominent example of a Cities Alliance CDS programme can be found in the Philippines. In 1999, the "World Bank/Japan, concurrent with UNDP/ UN-HABITAT" supported the development of CDS in three cities. Subsequently, "the Municipal League of the Philippines" expanded the project "to many more cities than initially included", due to the CDS’ capacity to aid leaders in understanding "the economic development of the city" and removing "constraints to its efficient functioning" to raise living standards of its citizens.

=== Slum upgrading ===
Slum upgrading, or the delivering of "a package of basic services: clean water supply and adequate sewage disposal to improve the well-being of the community" and "legalizing and ‘regularizing’ the properties in situations of insecure or unclear tenure" was, and continues to be, one of the first focuses of the Cities Alliance. Prominent slum upgrading projects undertaken by the Cities Alliance include:

- A Community-Led Infrastructure Financing Facility in Mumbai
- The Shelter Finance for the Poor Initiative in Peru, India, Mexico, Ecuador, and Kenya,
- A National Slum Upgrading Strategy in the Philippines
- The Vietnam Urban Upgrading Project (VUUP)
- Barrio Legal Programme in São Paulo
- National Upgrading Support Program (NUSP) in South Africa

=== Country programmes ===
Country programmes are considered the "fulcrum of its work program to longer-term, programmatic support". They are a framework, including "national and local governments, urban poor communities, Cities Alliance members, investors and other partners" and funding for projects. In their Uganda Country Programme, for instance, projects are targeted "not only where the bulk of urbanization is taking place, but also where capacity constraints, infrastructure backlogs, and affordability challenges are the most extreme".

=== Catalytic Fund ===
The Catalytic Fund of the Cities Alliance is a fund for small grants ($50,000 to $200,000), intended to "catalyse urban transformation processes that promote inclusive cities" and advance collective knowledge "through learning distilled from project experiences" and are issued along selected themes. The themes in question vary, but in years past, they have included "Know Your City" and "Youth and the City".

=== Advocacy ===
The Cities Alliance has had several high-profile advocates in its history, including:

- Clare Short: A British politician, Short has been a member of the Cities Alliance's policy arm since 2006.
- Sheela Patel: The founder of the Society for the Promotion of Area Resource Centers (SPARC) is an alumna of the policy arm, stepping away from her position in 2007.
- Mary Houghton: The co-founder of ShoreBank, Houghten is reportedly a former member of the Policy Advisory Board from 2001 until 2004.
- Somsook Boonyabancha: The Cities Alliance website lists the Secretary General of the Asian Coalition for Housing Rights (ACHR) as having been active in the Policy Advisory Board from 2001 until 2004.
- Jean Pierre Elong Mbassi: The Secretary General of the UCLG – Africa is also a member of the Cities Alliance Policy Advisory Board.
- Richard Webb Duarte: The ex-president of the Peruvian Central Bank participated in the Policy Advisory Board.
- Juanita Amatong: The former Philippine Secretary of Finance was also a member of the Policy Advisory Board.
- Paulo Teixeira: This member of the Brazilian National Congress contributed to the Policy Advisory Board.
- Nicephore Soglo: The former president of Benin, according to the Cities Alliance's website, began his engagement with the Policy Advisory Board in 2007.
- Mark Hildebrand: The former Chief of the Technical Cooperation Division of UN-Habitat was also the manager of the Cities Alliance from 1999 until 2006.

== Accomplishments ==
The Cities Alliance has been credited with several major developments in the field of urban innovation, dating from its inception. "Developed within the framework of the Cities Alliance", the "Cities Without Slums Action Plan", launched by Nelson Mandela, set an agenda and targets for improving conditions "of at least 100 million slum dwellers by 2020". This was subsequently "endorsed at the UN Millennium Summit" and is reflected in Goal 7, Target 11 of the Millennium Development Goals. In 2009, based on its track record, the Cities Alliance was further awarded a grant from the Bill and Melinda Gates Foundation to continue its work on slum upgrading in Burkina Faso, Ghana and Uganda through its country programs. It has also created a number of notable programmes, including several urban forums and its Land, Services and Citizenship programmes. The latter "aims to support national and local policy dialogue to promote sustainable urbanisation, ensure the empowerment of local governments and reinforce the importance of active community participation" by aligning "urban development efforts at the national, city and community levels" in Ghana and Vietnam.

== Membership ==
The Cities Alliance has a broad range of members including local authorities, national governments, non-governmental organisations, multi-lateral organisations, private sectors, foundation and knowledge institutions. Current and past members include:

- French Development Agency (AFD)
- AVSI Foundation (AVSI)
- Bundesministerium für wirtschaftliche Zusammenarbeit und Entwicklung (BMZ)
- Brazil's Ministério Das Cidades
- Caixa Econômica Federal (CAIXA)
- Commonwealth Local Government Forum (CLGF)
- The Department for International Development (DFID)
- Ethiopian Ministry of Urban Development, Housing and Construction
- The German Organisation for International Cooperation (GIZ)
- Habitat for Humanity International
- Housing and Urban Development Coordinating Council (HUDCC)
- Institute for Housing and Urban Development Studies (IHS)
- Local Governments for Sustainability (ICLEI)
- KfW (KfW)
- League of Cities of the Philippines (LCP)
- The French Ministry of Foreign Affairs and Economic Development (MAEDI)
- The World Association of Major Metropolises (Metropolis)
- Department for International Cooperation and Policy Support (MINVU)
- Nigeria Ministry of Works, Housing and Urban Development
- Royal Norwegian Ministry of Foreign Affairs
- Omidyar Network
- State Secretariat for Economic Affairs (SECO)
- Slum Dwellers International (SDI)
- Swedish International Development Cooperation Agency (SIDA)
- South African Department of Human Settlements
- The Ford Foundation
- United Cities and Local Governments (UCLG)
- United Nations Capital Development Fund (UNCDF)
- United Nations Environment Programme (UNEP)
- United Nations Development Programme (UNDP)
- United Nations Human Settlements Programme (UN-Habitat)
- United Nations Children's Fund (UNICEF)
- Women in Informal Employment: Globalizing and Organizing (WIEGO)
- World Bank

Professor Thuli Madonsela of South Africa was appointed as Chair of the Board in 2022.

== See also ==
- Slum Dwellers International (SDI)
- Slum
- Slum upgrading
- United Nations Office for Project Services (UNOPS)
