= We, the Invisible =

Report from pavement dweller census in Mumbai, India

We, the Invisible was a report based on a 1985 census of around 6,000 pavement dweller families, funded and carried out by the Society for the Promotion of Area Resource Centers (SPARC) and the Society for Participatory Research in India (PRIA). It drew attention to this disadvantaged group and helped to reduce the number of violent evictions.

== Aims ==
Activists from the Society for the Promotion of Area Resource Centers (SPARC) such as Sheela Patel and Jockin Arputham joined with the Society for Participatory Research in India (PRIA) in 1985, in order to make census of around 6,000 of the poorest households in Mumbai. The aim was to ascertain the scale and nature of the city's pavement dwellers, since despite being unavoidable on the street, there was little known about who they were or where they came from. It was a transparent process in which the researchers kept the households informed about the census at all stages. Slum dwellings had proliferated in the city, and the Municipal Corporation of Greater Mumbai had been granted permission to demolish pavement structures by a Supreme Court ruling.

== Findings ==
We, the Invisible revealed that pavement dwellers were not transient populations, but people who had lived for over two decades in the city. It showed approximately half of the pavement dwellers to be from the poorest districts in the state of Maharashtra, with the other half coming from the poorest parts of wider India. Many came as victims of drought, famine, earthquakes, religious persecution or riots. Most lived in shacks of less than 150 square feet with no electricity or water connection. They paid protection money to gangsters, despite living on municipal land. They were ignored by the city administration and could not afford to use public transport, but despite that provided a service to the city by being a source of cheap labour.

== Results ==
As a result of the report, there were no violent evictions of pavement dwellers in Mumbai despite the Supreme Court ruling. Negotiated evictions were facilitated and the group Mahila Milan was set up to represent women. In 1986, 300 households were moved from their shacks on the East Moses Road to the Dindoshi Nagar site in Goregaon. The plots were more spacious, but also rocky and the area was unsafe at night. Having had no choice in being moved, the families were saddened by the experience and this spurred SPARC to find out what people really wanted. Following on from these discussions, four model houses were built and displayed in Byculla for one week. Everyone who had participated in the census was invited to attend and over 5,000 households went. The favourite model was the most expensive, at 16,500 rupees and it was taken to over fifty other similar exhibitions. Also this model was then built by some of the Dindoshi residents on their land.

== See also ==
- Slum Dwellers International
