= ACHR =

ACHR may refer to:

- American Convention on Human Rights
- Arab Charter on Human Rights
- Asian Centre for Human Rights
- Acetylcholine receptor (AChR)
- Asian Coalition for Housing Rights
- Australian Centre for Health Research
- Access Center for Human Rights (ACHR)
