= NSDF (disambiguation) =

NSDF is the National Student Drama Festival in the UK.

NSDF may also refer to:

- National Slum Dwellers Federation, in India
- National Salvation Democratic Front, a Romanian political party created by Ion Iliescu
- National Space Defense Force, in the 1998 video game Battlezone
- National Social Democratic Front in South Vietnam
