= Hema Sankalia =

Indian architect

- Born: 1934; Sialkot, British Raj
- Died: 2015 (aged 80–81)
- Citizenship: India
- Occupation: Architect
- Spouse: Shireesh Sankalia
- Parent: Rama Bakhle (Mother)

Hema Sankalia (1934–2015) was one of the first female architects in India.

== Life ==
=== Early life ===
Sankalia was born in Sialkot, India (now part of Pakistan) in 1934 to a Maharashtrian Brahmin family. Her father worked in the Indian Civil Service, and was educated in England, but died in 1935 when Sankalia was a year old. Her mother Rama Bakhle, a writer who graduated from Karve University, then moved the family to Mumbai to be with her uncle who was an engineer and general manager of Western Railways. In 1951, at the age of 17, Sankalia joined Sir J. J. School of Art with only two other girls in her class (Rashmi Daftari and Chandramani Gandhi). After three years of schooling, she wanted to study abroad to expand her education, but lost the support of higher education from her uncle.

=== Work life ===
Sankalia began her career with the architecture firm of Mody and Colgan (Piloo Mody and Vina Mody) in Bombay. She credits Vina Mody as one of her gurus, who hired Sankalia to work in construction sites alongside masons, carpenters, and electricians. Along side Mody she gives Pravina Mehta credit on massively inspiring her creativity within architecture, later becoming one of the first female work partners in the country.

In 1957 she married Shireesh Sankalia, a 'pavement dweller' engineer, Until his death in 1984, he consistently supported Sankalia's career path.

Sankalia and Mody went on to form (Contemporary Arts and Crafts), to create household products and educate the Indian artisan and consumer about the modern world. As an innovation, they displayed the products in the store as if they were already in the home or office. She worked at CAC until 2005 where she retired and passed it on to her son. The store still exists today in Mumbai and Pune.

Her commissions over time outside of household appliances included houses, women's hostels, printing presses, hospitals, research centers, governmental offices, and educational institutions. She took part in forming the designs for the states EPCO (Environmental Planning and Coordination Organization) between 1987 and 1988, designed as part ashram and part modern edifice. .

In 1985 Sankalia formed the Research Unit for Practice (RUP) with Subodh Dhairyawan. This was a multidisciplinary practice focusing in product design, architecture, and urban/environmental planning. This would produce several housing clusters for low income groups, as well as middle and upper classes.
