= Jockin Arputham =

Indian community leader (1947–2018)

Padma Shri Jockin Arputham
- Born: 15 August 1947; Kolar Gold Fields, Mysore State, Dominion of India (now Karnataka, India)
- Died: 13 October 2018 (aged 71); Mumbai, Maharashtra, India
- Occupations: Community leader, housing activist
- Organization: Slum Dwellers International
- Awards: Ramon Magsaysay Award; Padma Shri

Jockin Arputham (15 August 1947 – 13 October 2018) was an Indian community leader and activist, noted for over four decades of work on issues related to slums and shanty towns. He was born in Karnataka, India and moved to Mumbai, where he became involved in community organizing and leadership. In 2011, he received the Padma Shri for his contributions to social work. In 2014, he was nominated for the Nobel Peace Prize, along with the organisation he co-founded, Slum Dwellers International.

== Early life ==
Arputham was born to Tamil parents who lived in Kolar Gold Fields (in present-day Kolar district of Karnataka) on 15 August 1947, the same day of India's independence from the United Kingdom . When he was 16, he moved to Bangalore looking for work.

== Politicization ==
When he was eighteen, he moved to Mumbai where he worked as a carpenter and building contractor. Since he had nowhere to live, he slept on the street in Janata Colony, a slum of 70,000 people. He worked at the construction of the Bhabha Atomic Research Centre (BARC). Seeing that he did not need credentials to do so, he began a company to manage workers and organised a school in the slum. The city did not organize a rubbish collection, so he encouraged 3,000 children to bring a bag of garbage to a picnic at the council offices and won a regular rubbish collection service.

Between 1971 and 1972, Arputham went to Kolkata to work with refugees escaping war in Bangladesh.

Back in Mumbai, when Janata colony was threatened with eviction in the 1970s, he helped organize protests and court cases. He was arrested over 40 times. He also sat outside the Parliament in Delhi for 18 days until the then Prime Minister Indira Gandhi would see him. She promised they would not be evicted, but in 1976, 12,000 police stormed the slum and evicted all 70,000 people in one night. Everyone was forcibly transferred to the still extant Cheetah Camp slum.

When India declared a state of emergency, Arputham was forced to flee the country in 1977 to avoid imprisonment. With the help of the World Council of Churches he went to the Philippines visiting local slumdwellers groups. Every three months he had to leave the country to renew his visa so he went to Japan, Malaysia and South Korea.

== Career ==
Arputham was the president of the National Slum Dwellers Federation (NSDF) which he founded in the late 1970s. He was also co-founder of Slum Dwellers International (SDI) which networks slum and shack dweller organizations and federations from over thirty countries across the world. The National Slum Dwellers Federation works closely with Mahila Milan, a collective of savings groups formed by homeless women and women living in slums across India, and with the Society for the Promotion of Area Resource Centers (SPARC), a Mumbai-based NGO. This alliance has supported thousands of the urban poor access better housing and sanitation.

Slum Dwellers International claimed the alliance helped 1 million people in 15,000 slum dwellers-managed saving groups. Further they had secured land rights for 128,000 families, building over 20,000 toilets and 100,000 houses. The National Slum Dwellers Federation stated it had helped 60,000 families improve their housing situation in Mumbai.

Arputham has also worked with the police to set up "police panchayats" in many of the informal settlements in Mumbai. Here, for the first time, police are assigned to work in these settlements and are supported by a committee of ten residents from the community (made up of three men and seven women). The concept was pioneered by Anami Narayan Roy, the Police Commissioner of Pune.

A week after his death, Arputham was commemorated by a large poster calling him the "slum king" in Dharavi, where he lived.

== Awards ==
- 2000: The Ramon Magsaysay Award for Peace and International Understanding.
- 2009: Honorary Ph.D. from KIIT University, Bhubaneswar.
- 2011: The Government of India bestowed on him its fourth highest civilian honor, the Padma Shri award.
- 2014: Skoll award for social entrepreneurship.
- 2014: Nominated for the Nobel Peace Prize by Stefan Attefall, Swedish minister for public administration and housing.

== Selected works ==
- Arputham, Jockin. 2008. "Developing new approaches for people-centred development". Environment and Urbanization, 20 (2) 319–337 doi:10.1177/0956247808096115
- Arputham, Jockin; Bartlett, Sheridan; Patel, Sheela. 2015. "'We beat the path by walking': How the women of Mahila Milan in India learned to plan, design, finance and build housing". Environment & Urbanization, 28(1) doi:10.1177/0956247815617440
- Arputham, Jockin; Patel, Sheela. 2008. "Plans for Dharavi: negotiating a reconciliation between a state-driven market redevelopment and residents’ aspirations". Environment and Urbanization 20(1) 243–254.
