= Mahila Milan =

Collective of female pavement dwellers in Bombay

Mahila Milan (Hindi: 'women together') is a self-organised, decentralised collective of female pavement dwellers in Bombay. The group works with issues such as housing, sanitation, and grassroots lending schemes. It aims at gaining women equal recognition for improvement of their communities, while indulging in important decision making activities. The loans granted by the group to its members in times of need, are sanctioned in the name of the woman of the house.

Mahila Milan refers to the 2% interest charged levied, two rupees ‘service charge’ on every hundred rupees. For their recovery process, the women visit the house of the loan defaulter. If it looks like they really are in no position to return the loan, they give them another loan to get them back on their feet and ensure that with the second loan the family stays afloat. If the man of the house dies or is suddenly bedridden with sickness, they write off the loan. The organization provides supports to borrowers facing financial hardship.

== History ==
Mahila Milan was formed in the 1980s, when the National Slum Dwellers Federation (NSDF) agreed to help create a sister organisation complementary to its own, to encourage more women to enter leadership roles in slum development and poverty alleviation, with the assistance of Sheela Patel and her group SPARC. Community-based organizations, Mahila Milan and the NSDF, alongside the Society for the Promotion of Area Resource Centers (SPARC), have been working together since the mid-1980s to improve the housing situation of pavement dwellers in Byculla, an area in central Mumbai. When these three organizations came together to form what is known as the Alliance, pavement dwellers were amongst the worst of inhabitants in the city. Although physically quite visible on the streets, pavement dwellers were entirely invisible in public policy. They could not obtain ration cards, which are identity cards that grant citizens the right to schooling and access to subsidized food, nor could they gain access to basic services like water, sanitation, and electricity. Pavement dwellers, unlike slum dwellers, were also excluded from electoral rolls and any official census taken in the city and throughout the country.

Mahila Milan was formed largely in response to a 1985 Supreme Court ruling that granted the Municipal Corporation of Greater Mumbai authority to demolish household structures on the sidewalks of Mumbai. These were the homes of those known popularly as "pavement dwellers". Many NGOs and community-based organizations planned mass action to confront these demolitions, however SPARC activists found that women from pavement settlements did not want confrontation and preferred to work out a way to coexist with the rest of the people in the city.

A survey carried out by SPARC between July and October 1985 found that pavement dwellers were not transient populations, but people who had lived for over two decades in the city. This was documented and published in We The Invisible, which detailed the background of these people from the poorest districts of India – victims of underdevelopment, communal violence, floods, famines and other crises. There were no evictions, and by March 1987 Mahila Milan was established to help poor illiterate women in each settlement understand the politics of why they cannot get land in the city for their house, and to develop a strategy to present to the city.

In 1992, leaders of the emerging South African Homeless People’s Federation went to Mumbai to participate in a survey and housing exhibition. This fuelled the participation of Mahila Milan and NSDF leaders to visit Durban. There, they conducted the first training for community leaders from five settlements in Piesang River. What started with a survey, ended with a housing exhibition.

The alliance formed by the South African Federation and Mahila Milan, along with federations having similar goals, from more than 30 countries, are now united under the umbrella organisation of Shack/Slum Dwellers International (SDI). Among their many shared practices and objectives, these central hands-on housing design and development processes continue to explore and promise a sector house in the city. SDI gained much more exposure than ever before in the year 2001 when it took a 36-member international team to New York. at the United Nations governing council meetings, the team built a full-size house model and a community toilet block in the UN building. Although merely five or six years old, the SDI was on its path to pave a way for the urban poor to gain recognition globally and stake their claim in the global habitat-linked discussions. Members of SDI, were however disappointed as only a few cared about what the urban poor had to say in the formal proceedings. Kofi Annan, then the head of the UN, spent over half an hour with the SDI delegation and, before SDI really understood branding and imagery, the house model exhibition in the UN made it known throughout the global community, as delegation after delegation had its pictures taken in front of the SDI house or toilet model.

== Programs ==
Assisted by the Society for the Promotion of Area Resource Centres (SPARC), Mahila Milan runs a number of programs. These include:

- Milan Nagar, a cooperative designed to seek alternative siting for their housing;
- Opening bank accounts establishing saving schemes to assist women towards purchasing new homes
- Providing each family with essential food and clothing
- Dealing with crises, such as the provision of emergency loans, or assisting with police-related problems.

== Crisis credit scheme ==
When six pavement dweller groups completed a project in 1987 building shelter for themselves, they realised they needed more than housing. Therefore they created a crisis credit scheme, in which every person contributes 1 or 2 rupees and anyone can borrow a sum when they need it. One year later Mahila Milan was instructing groups across India on how to set up such a scheme and in 1989 the groups were lending to each other. By 2001, there were 25,000 households in the scheme and 5,000 borrowers.

Since most of the women were illiterate, Mahila Milan teaches a system where everyone has a pouch in which different coloured pieces of paper represent their savings. The smallest unit is 15 households, all of which know and trust each other. Each group makes its own decisions about lending.

== Housing ==
Mahila Milan have been active in advocating the earmarking of vacant land for the homeless, and designing strategy to help the poor into their own homes. The organisation became a model for other NSDF-affiliated organisations between 1985 and 1995, providing principles and frameworks to form the basis of discussions between informal settlements and cities. In 1995, the government of Maharashtra integrated pavement dwellers for the first time into the classifications of households entitled to land for relocation in the Slum Rehabilitation Act.

In Dharavi, Mumbai's biggest slum, women joined Mahila Milan and asked for land to build permanent homes on. They designed and built the houses to suit their budget.

== Sanitation ==
Mahila Milan negotiates with local administrations for women to be able to build their own sanitation units in their own local area. As of 2016, the group has facilitated the construction of 100 toilet blocks.
