= Slum Rehabilitation Act, 1995 =

The Slum Rehabilitation Act, 1995 was passed by the government of the Indian state Maharashtra to protect the rights of swamp dwellers and promote the development of swamp areas. The Act protected from eviction, anyone who could produce a document proving they lived in the city of Mumbai before January 1995, regardless if they lived on the swamp or other kinds of marsh land. The ACT was the result of policy development that included grassroots slum dweller organisations, particularly SPARC.

Through the Act, pavement dwellers were for the first time accepted into the classification of households that are entitled to land for relocation. Following the enactment of this legislation, the government of Maharashtra and the Municipal Corporation of Greater Mumbai set out a special policy for planning the relocation of the 20,000 households, using the information from a census Mahila Milan and NSDF completed in 1995.

== Overview ==
The legislation was passed in reaction to the proliferation of slums in Indian cities, where a large section of the population lives in cramped, unsanitary circumstances with no access to essential services such as water, sewage, and power. The UN's definition of slums - those that live under one roof and lack basic amenities such as: durable housing, sufficient living area; access to improved water, access to sanitation facilities and secure tenure. The act establishes a framework for slum redevelopment with the goal of improving living conditions for slum people while simultaneously supporting urban growth.

The act calls for the establishment of a Slum Rehabilitation Authority (SRA) . The SRA is in charge of identifying slums and launching slum redevelopment operations. The authority is also in charge of procuring land, issuing permits, and overseeing the progress of slum redevelopment programmes.

The provision for the Transfer of Development rights (TDR) is an important aspect of the Slum Rehabilitation Act. TDR is a method that permits developers to transfer the right to create more floor space to another place in exchange for the building of slum rehabilitation dwellings. This clause encourages developers to embark on slum reconstruction projects by providing them with additional floor space that can be utilised for commercial reasons. The policy also assures that slum inhabitants get better housing because rehabilitation housing must meet certain specifications and standards. The Slum Rehabilitation Act also includes provisions for the establishment of slum rehabilitation programmes (SRS).

An SRS is a slum redevelopment plan that comprises rehabilitation housing, infrastructure, and amenities such as water supply, drainage, and roadways. The SRA is in charge of developing and executing the SRS in conjunction with slum inhabitants. The SRS also provides a provision for slum dwellers to participate in the redevelopment process, ensuring that their interests are taken into account.

== Limitations of Slum Rehabilitation Act (1995) ==
The Slum Rehabilitation Act, on the other hand, has been rebuked for poor execution. One of the main concerns is that developers have utilised the statute to exploit slum inhabitants. Developers have been accused of purchasing slum land and then delaying the construction of rehabilitation houses while taking advantage of the TDR clause to create additional commercial space. As a result, slum inhabitants have been made homeless without obtaining any benefits. Complaints have also been made that the rehabilitation housing given under the legislation is of poor quality and does not suit the needs of slum inhabitants.

== Subsequent Schemes: Pradhan Mantri Awas Yojana Scheme ==
Slum Rehabilitation schemes have been driven in recent years by an active effort to further city planning in the light of rising urbanisation and population migration. Mumbai has incurred a massive population surge in recent decades, therefore, the government has aimed to rehouse unhoused inhabitants of slums in Mumbai into separate housing. More recently, Modi's government enforced the Pradhan Mantri Awas Yojana Scheme in India where affordable housing will be provided to the urban poor. This scheme is a four pronged approach and aims to eliminate all slums by 2022. Critics suggest this is a more improved approach to the Slum Rehabilitation Act of 1995 as it also allows credit loans to beneficiaries that allows them to buy houses as well as improving the supply side of housing. This scheme in 1995 solely focus on the rehabilitation of slum housing and not tenure security and boosting home ownership for the urban poor in India.
