= Prema Gopalan =

Indian activist

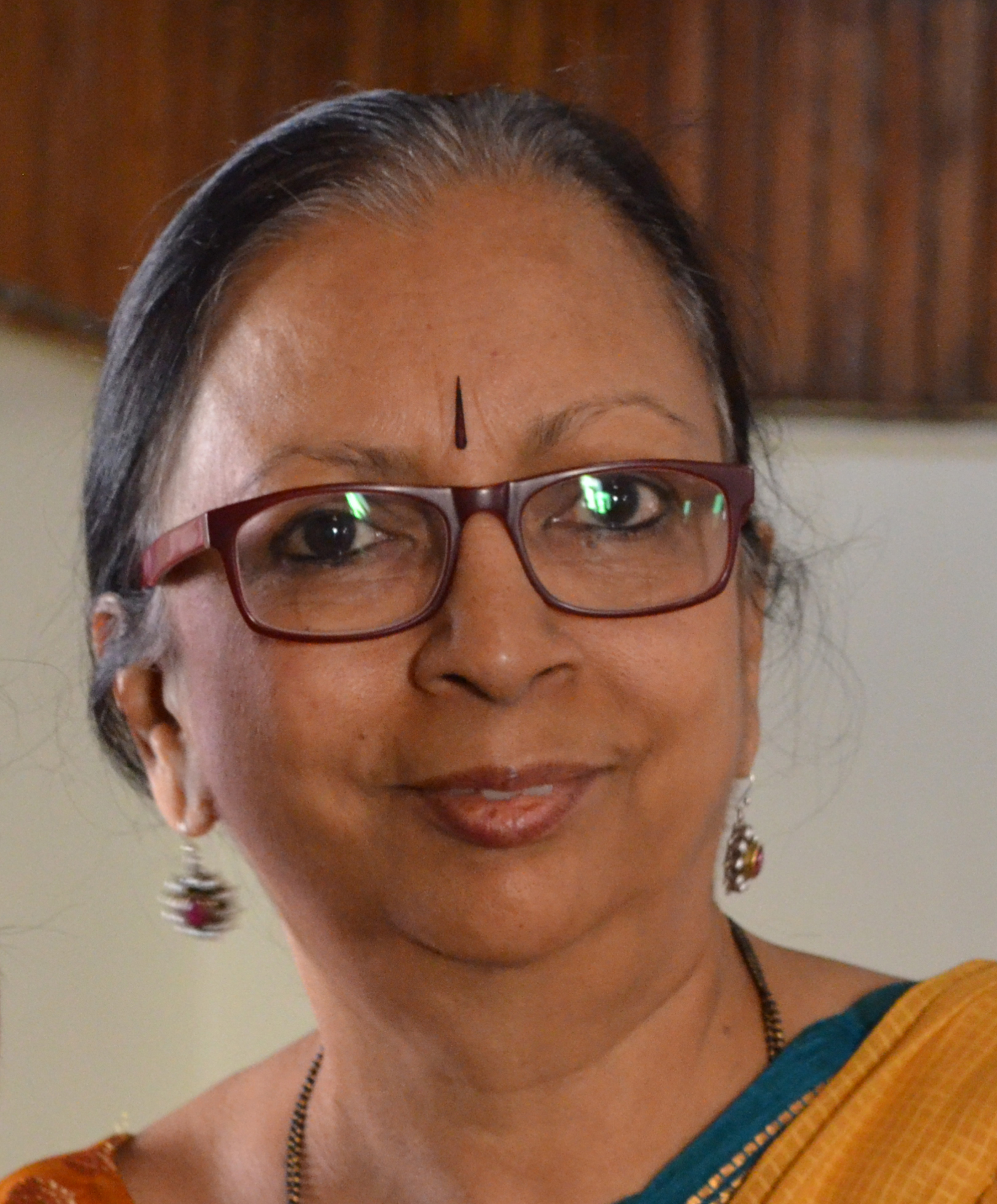
- Died: 29 March 2022

Prema Gopalan (1955/1956 – 29 March 2022) was an Indian social activist. She co-founded the Society for the Promotion of Area Resource Centers (SPARC) in 1984. She then founded and has been executive director of Swayam Shikshan Prayog (SSP) for over 20 years, supporting poor rural women in entrepreneurial schemes. She is also well known for disaster relief work in Bihar, Gujarat, Kerala, Maharashtra and Tamil Nadu. Gopalan has received awards from the United Nations Framework Convention on Climate Change and the United Nations Development Programme. She died on 29 March 2022 after a short illness at the age of 66.

== Early life ==
Prema Gopalan was born in Pune, India. She held an MA in social work and completed a M.Phil. in sociology and research methodology.

== Career ==
Prema Gopalan was a co-founder with Sheela Patel of SPARC in 1984. She started SSP in 1993, aiming to put rural poor women at the center of decentralized and democratic methods of self-management. SSP functioned as a self-education network within SPARC until it (in association with the Government of Maharashtra) redesigned and implemented a widespread community participation strategy across 1200 villages in the earthquake-hit districts of Latur and Osmanabad. Gopalan has also worked with support efforts following the 2001 Gujarat earthquake, the 2004 Indian Ocean earthquake and tsunami and floods in Bihar and Kerala. SSP has helped women entrepreneurs to start businesses in these recovering zones.

== Awards and recognition ==
Gopalan has been made both an Ashoka Fellow and a Synergos Fellow. The United Nations Framework Convention on Climate Change (UNFCCC) presented her with the Momentum for Change Award 2016 and the following year she won an Equator Prize from the United Nations Development Programme (UNDP). In 2018, Gopalan was presented with Social Entrepreneur of the Year award by the Schwab Foundation for Social Entrepreneurship.
