= World Habitat Day =

Day of reflection recognized by the United Nations

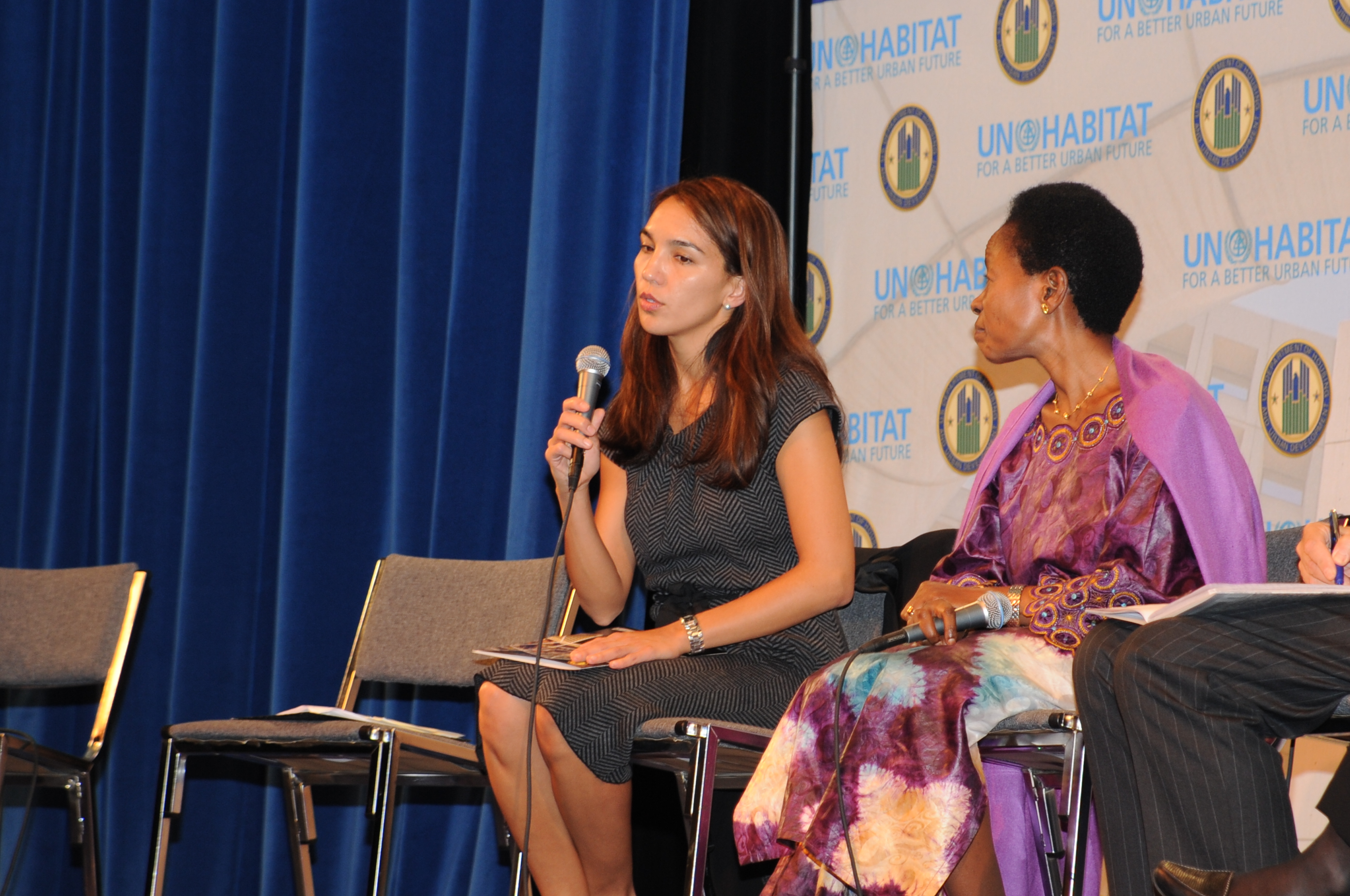
2009 World Habitat Day

World Habitat Day is marked on the first Monday of October each year, and is recognized by the United Nations to reflect on the state of towns and cities, and on the basic right of all to adequate shelter. The day is also intended to remind the world that everyone has the power and the responsibility to shape the future of towns and cities. World Habitat Day was first celebrated in 1986 in Nairobi, Kenya, and the theme chosen for that year was "Shelter is My Right".

The United Nations General Assembly decided that this should be an annual event and the first Monday of October was chosen. The day is celebrated in many countries around the world and various activities are organized to examine the problems of rapid urbanisation and its impact on the environment and human poverty.

Annual themes for World Habitat Day have been diverse and have included "Shelter for the Homeless", "Our Neighbourhood", "Safer Cities," "Women in Urban Government," Cities without Slums" and "Water and Sanitation for Cities."

UN Habitat makes plain the need to plan cities in order to avoid the chaotic development of urban sprawl and all the associated problems that are created as a result.

Well-planned cities can be centres for economic activities and address urban challenges, providing opportunities to both current and future residents. If more city residents are able to get a job or start their own businesses, small business and broader economic growth can lead to more job creation and employment opportunities. For example, according to the World Bank, for every job added in the healthcare industry, 3.4 new jobs are created.

On the other hand, cities can also become a setting in which marginalisation, inequality and social exclusion can abound. Access to adequate housing is an important factor in ensuring this is avoided.

Another major issue is the ever-increasing risk posed by natural disasters as the climate crisis continues to develop. This risk is particularly significant in the Caribbean Region and Central America, where countries such as Haiti, Nicaragua, Honduras, El Salvador and Bolivia have higher levels of poverty and where their cities are exceptionally vulnerable due to their population density and diversity.

High levels of population density, coupled with poor building techniques have given rise to shanty towns that have no proper infrastructure, community organization or security of tenure. In the event of a disaster of any kind, a complete breakdown can result in a chaotic situation and enormous loss of life.

== Habitat Scroll of Honour ==
The UN-Habitat Scroll of Honour Award was launched by the United Nations Human Settlements Programme (UN-Habitat) in 1989. It is currently the most prestigious human settlements award in the world. Its aim is to acknowledge initiatives which have made outstanding contributions in various fields such as shelter provision, highlighting the plight of the homeless, leadership in post conflict reconstruction and developing and improving human settlements and the quality of urban life.

The award, a plaque engraved with the name of the winner and their achievement, is presented to the winners during the Global Observance of the World Habitat Day.

== Previous World Habitat Days ==
Year	Theme	Global Observance venue	Host
2026	Adequate Housing for All	Muscat, Oman	HE. Sheikh AbdulMalik bin Abdullah Al Khalili, Chairman of the State Council
2025	Urban Crisis Response	United Nations Office at Nairobi, Kenya	UN-Habitat
2024	Engaging youth to create a better urban future	Querétaro, Mexico	Mauricio Kuri González, Governor of the State of Querétaro, United Mexican States
2023	Resilient urban economies. Cities as drivers of growth and recovery	Baku, Azerbaijan	Anar Guliyev, chairman, State Committee on Urban Planning and Architecture of the Republic of Azerbaijan
2022	Mind the Gap. Leave No One and No Place Behind	Balıkesir, Turkey	Murat Kurum, Minister of Environment, Urbanisation and Climate Change of the Republic of Turkey
2021	Accelerating urban action for a carbon-free world	Yaounde, Cameroon	Célestine Ketcha Courtès, Minister of Housing and Urban Development
2020	Housing For All: A Better Urban Future	Surabaya, Indonesia	Basuki Hadimuljono, Minister of Public Works and Housing, Indonesia
2019	Frontier Technologies as an Innovative Tool to Transform Waste to Wealth	Mexico City, Mexico	Martha Delgado Peralta, Undersecretary for Multilateral Affairs and Human Rights, and UN-Habitat Assembly President
2018	Municipal Solid Waste Management	United Nations Office at Nairobi, Kenya	Uhuru Kenyatta, President of Kenya
2017	Housing Policies: Affordable Housing	None	
2016	Housing at the Centre	New Delhi, India	
2015	Public Spaces for All	none	
2014	Voices from Slums	none	
2013	Urban Mobility	none	
2012	Changing Cities, Building Opportunities	Embu, Kenya	
2011	Cities and Climate Change	Aguascalientes, Mexico	
2010	Better City, Better Life	Shanghai, China	
2009	Planning our urban future	Washington, D.C., United States of America	
2008	Harmonious Cities	Luanda, Angola	José Eduardo dos Santos - President of Angola
2007	A safe city is a just city	The Hague, Netherlands	Wim Deetman, Mayor of The Hague and chairman of UCLG
2006	Cities, magnets of hope	Monterrey, Mexico	Beatriz Zavala Peniche, Secretary of Social Development, (SEDESOL) on "Rescue of Public Spaces Programme"
2005	The Millennium Development Goals and the City	Jakarta, Indonesia	President Susilo Bambang Yudhoyono
2004	Cities - Engines of Rural Development	Nairobi, Kenya	President Mwai Kibaki of Kenya
2003	Water and Sanitation for Cities	Rio de Janeiro, Brazil	César Maia, Mayor of Rio de Janeiro
2002	City-to-City Cooperation	Brussels, Belgium	H.R.H. Prince Philippe
2001	Cities without Slums	Fukuoka, Japan	Wataru Asō, Governor of Fukuoka Prefecture
2000	Women in Urban Governance	Jamaica	Seymour Mullings, Deputy Prime Minister and Minister of Land and Environment
1999	Cities for All	Dalian, China	Yu Zhengsheng, Minister of Construction, China
1998	Safer Cities	Dubai, United Arab Emirates	Qasim Sultan Al Banna, Director General, Dubai Municipality UAE
1997	Future Cities	Bonn, Germany	Klaus Töpfer, Federal Minister for Regional Planning, Building and Urban Development, Germany
1996	Urbanization, Citizenship and Human Solidarity	Budapest, Hungary	Minister of the Interior, Hungary
1995	Our Neighbourhood	Curitiba, Brazil	Mayor of Curitiba
1994	Home and the Family	Dakar, Senegal	Abdou Diouf, President of Senegal
1993	Women and Shelter Development	New York City, United States of America	Boutros Boutros-Ghali, Secretary-General of the United Nations
1992	Shelter and Sustainable Development	New York City, United States of America	Boutros Boutros-Ghali, Secretary-General of the United Nations
1991	Shelter and the Living Environment	Hiroshima, Japan	Mayor of Hiroshima
1990	Shelter and Urbanization	London, United Kingdom	Sir Geoffrey Howe
1989	Shelter, Health and the Family	Jakarta, Indonesia	Suharto, President of Indonesia
1988	Shelter and Community	London, United Kingdom	Robert Runcie, Archbishop of Canterbury
1987	Shelter for the Homeless	New York City, United States of America	Javier Pérez de Cuéllar, Secretary-General of the United Nations
1986	Shelter is my Right	Nairobi, Kenya	

== See also ==
- World Habitat Awards
