= Lallubhai Compound =

- Neighbourhood
- Location in Mumbai, India
- Coordinates: 19.05°N 72.93°E
- Country: India
- State: Maharashtra
- District: Mumbai Suburban
- Metro: Mumbai
- Zone: 5
- Ward: M

Languages
  - Official: Marathi
- Time zone: UTC+5:30 (IST)

Lallubhai Compound is a residential colony in suburban Mankhurd, Mumbai. The residential colony is a cluster of 72 buildings, was created under the Slum Rehabilitation Act (SRA), with construction work completed in 2003. Lallubhai Compound houses people who lived near the Chembur, PD Mello road(CST), Matunga and Kurla railway stations, as well as slum and pavement dwellers.

The colony has a total of 65 7-storey and 5-storey buildings with more than 9,300 residential tenements, with activists calling it a "vertical slum".
