= Swayam Shikshan Prayog =

Non-governmental organization based in Pune, India

- Formation: 1998; 28 years ago
- Founder: Prema Gopalan; Sheela Patel
- Type: Women's organisation
- Legal status: Active
- Headquarters: Pune, Maharashtra, India
- Region served: India
- Website: Official website

Swayam Shikshan Prayog (SSP) is a non-governmental organization based in Pune, India. It was co-founded by Prema Gopalan and Sheela Patel in 1998 and aims to support female entrepreneurs in areas such as agriculture, health and sanitation. Its work has been recognized by the United Nations Development Programme and the United Nations Framework Convention on Climate Change.

== History ==
Following the Latur earthquake of 1993 in Maharashtra, Prema Gopalan focused upon supporting rural communities in the region of Marathwada. By 1998 the rehabilitation projects were complete and this led to the setting up of Swayam Shikshan Prayog (SSP) by Gopalan and Sheela Patel. It is a non-governmental organization (NGO) based in Pune. SSP aims to educate and support female entrepreneurship in areas such as agriculture, health, nutrition, sanitation and clean energy. Since 2009 it has assisted over 350,000 grassroots women.

SSP provides assistance to women working in the field of clean or sustainable energy. The United Nations Framework Convention on Climate Change (UNFCCC) reported in 2019 that SSP had reached over 4 million people in India, mainly in Maharashtra, Bihar, Gujarat and Tamil Nadu. Links had been made between 1,100 female entrepreneurs working on clean energy systems in eight different districts.

The government of Maharashtra government chose SSP to be the group which runs the Mahila Kisan Sashaktikaran Pariyojana programme. This has involved over 25,000 female farmers in 600 village working to improve their agricultural methods.

SSP developed a model of livelihood diversification to reduce the risks and vulnerabilities while increasing the capacities of small and marginal farmers. The Women-led Climate Resilient Farming (WCRF) model of SSP promotes the multi-cropping of indigenous climate-appropriate food crops. This ensures household food and income security with good nutrition while conserving water and natural resources.

Through our entrepreneurship development program, SSP has helped thousands of women start businesses and grow by creating farmer producer groups.

SSP's flagship initiative, "Women's Initiative to Learn and Lead" (WILL), focuses on women's agency and leadership, enabling them to participate in governance, address critical issues at home and in the community, and empower other women.

== Awards ==
Swayam Shikshan Prayog won the sixth Billionth South Asia Award 2015 for its work on rural medical assistance. In 2016, SSP won the United Nations Framework Convention on Climate Change (UNFCCC) Momentum for Change Lighthouse Activity Award for its support of rural networks building clean energy systems. In the following years, SSP won the Equator Prize 2017 awarded by United Nations Development Programme; Schwab Foundation's Social Entrepreneur of the Year India Award 2018; Schwab Foundation's Outstanding Social Entrepreneur of the Year (WEF) award 2019; NITI Aayog’s Women Transforming India Award 2021; and, Global Local Adaptation (CGA)’s Local Adaptation Award for Capacity and Knowledge (for the Women Led Climate Resilient Farming Model) at COP27 in 2022.
