= Zena Daysh =

New Zealand human ecologist

Zena Isabel Daysh CNZM (née Clarke, 30 April 1914 – 23 March 2011) was a New Zealander who was influential in the human ecology movement and the founder of the Commonwealth Human Ecology Council in 1969.

== Early life ==
Zena Daysh was born in New Plymouth, New Zealand in 1914, the daughter of the mayor of New Plymouth. Her father, James Clarke, died in November 1920 in the country's second fatal air crash. She was a proficient fencer and well known in New Zealand fencing circles. In the 1930s she moved to live in England where she married Mr N. Goodlet Daysh though they separated in the 1940s.

== Career ==
Daysh trained as a physiotherapist. During World War II she was well known in London society for her massage and exercise therapy. At the same time she became interested in the human and social needs of people working in wartime factories and developed a philosophy of the interdependence of people with each other and with nature. While she believed in people taking responsibility for their own health and in preventive medicine, she believed that communities and governments should work together to achieve healthy societies in a stable environment.

After the war she returned to New Zealand until the late 1950s when she convened the Commonwealth Committee on Preventive Medicine in London. With a number of other health professionals she penned a letter to The Times calling for the formation of a Commonwealth Council of Nutrition to improve standards of health and nutrition in Commonwealth countries. In 1964 she proposed to the government of Malta that they use human ecology as the framework for development planning.

Her work during the 1960s culminated in her founding the Commonwealth Human Ecology Council (CHEC) in 1969 and organising the First Commonwealth Conference on Development and Human Ecology in 1970.

Daysh supported many community projects which were examples of human ecology and sustainability: community-based reafforestation in India, urban market gardens for women in Sierra Leone, reconstruction after a tsunami in Sri Lanka, and micro-banks to support women's businesses in Africa to name a few.

Zena Daysh died in London on 23 March 2011.

== Honours and awards ==
Daysh received a CNZM in the 1999 New Year Honours in New Zealand followed by the UN–Habitat Scroll of Honour Award in 2003. In 2009 the University of Waikato awarded Daysh an honorary doctorate in recognition of her work in human ecology. After her death the University of Waikato received a $500,000 bequest from Daysh which it used to create a Dr Zena Daysh Fellowship in Sustainable Development to support research into sustainable development. In 2018 CHEC held the Inaugural Zena Daysh Lecture.

== Publications ==
- Gorinsky, C., Shirley, D., Daysh, Z., & Commonwealth Human Ecology Council. (1991). Human ecology, environmental management education and training for development: Report of the Asian Seminar, Jaipur, India 8–12 May 1991. London: Commonwealth Human Ecology Council. OCLC 28065739
- Griffith, A., Daysh, Z., Shirley, D., & Commonwealth Human Ecology Council. (1992). The commonwealth and environmental management : a synthesis : Report of the Vancouver seminar 29–31 July 1991 (Human ecology development series, 3). London: Commonwealth Human Ecology Council. OCLC 28339255
- Daysh, Zena. Human ecology and health in a global system. In Boleyn, T., & Honari, M. (2005). Health Ecology: Health, Culture and Human-Environment Interaction. p. xv–xviii.
