= Slum clearance =

Removal or destruction of slums

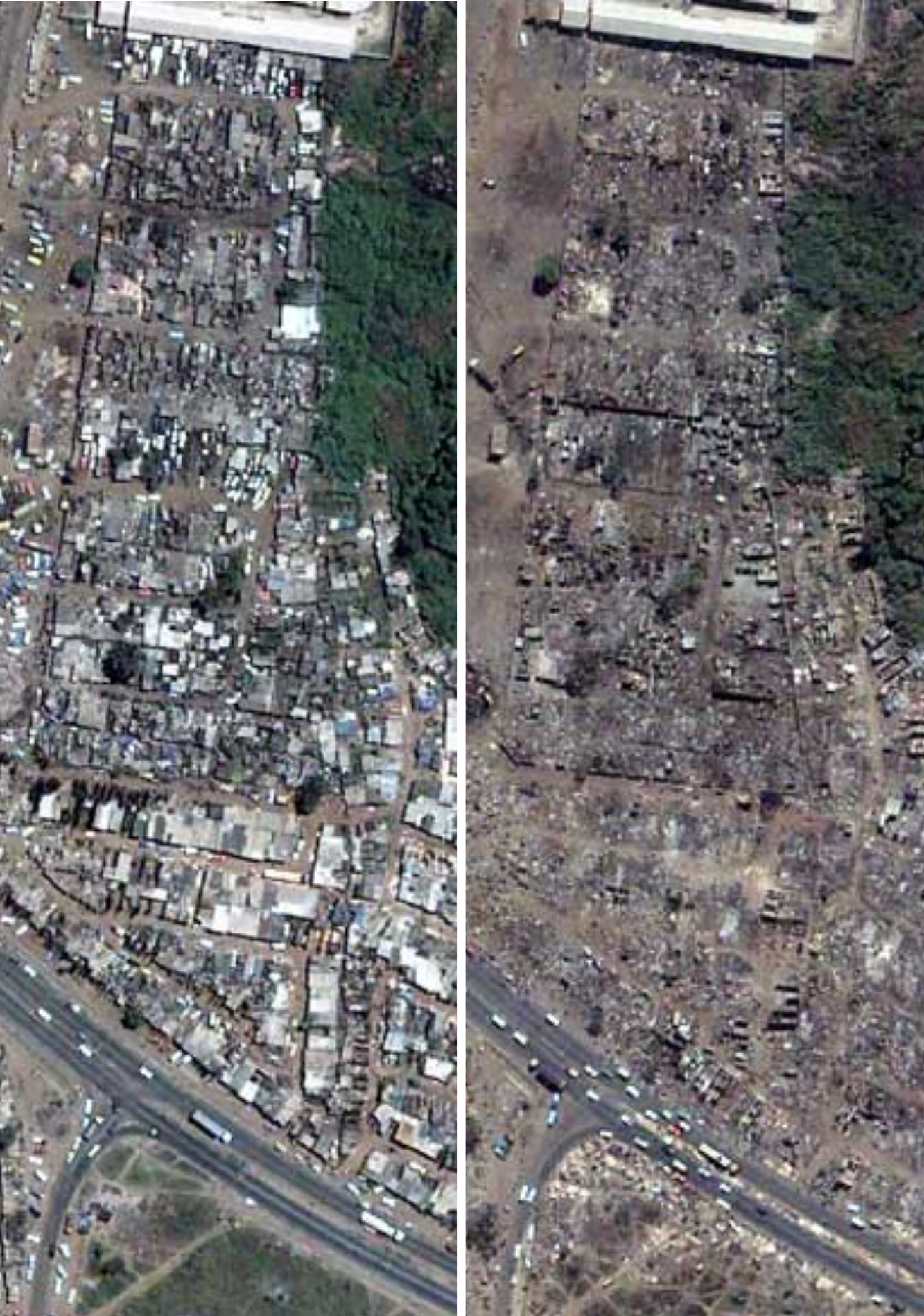
Operation Murambatsvina was a large-scale campaign by the government of Zimbabwe involving forced evictions and slum demolitions.

Slum clearance, slum eviction or slum removal is an urban renewal redevelopment policy that aims at the demolition of informal, irregular, or low-income settlements, such as slums, tenements, and shanty towns, often justified by goals of infrastructure improvement, sanitation, transportation integration, or mitigation of hazard areas.

Although sometimes associated with the provision of public and affordable housing, historically, this practice has been intensely used in various national contexts, often focusing on social cleansing, real estate speculation, and the gentrification of central urban areas.

Such policies generate profound socioeconomic impacts, such as the disintegration of community networks, the displacement of residents from their sources of income, and the overburdening of public services in peripheral resettlement regions. Interventions are commonly marked by conflict and organized resistance, where social movements often demand in-situ urbanization instead of pure and simple removal. Recent cases in various world metropolises continue to illustrate these tensions, involving protests against violent evictions and complex negotiations surrounding the right to housing.

The alternative to clearance has been the upgrading of precarious settlements and land titling.

== Reasons ==
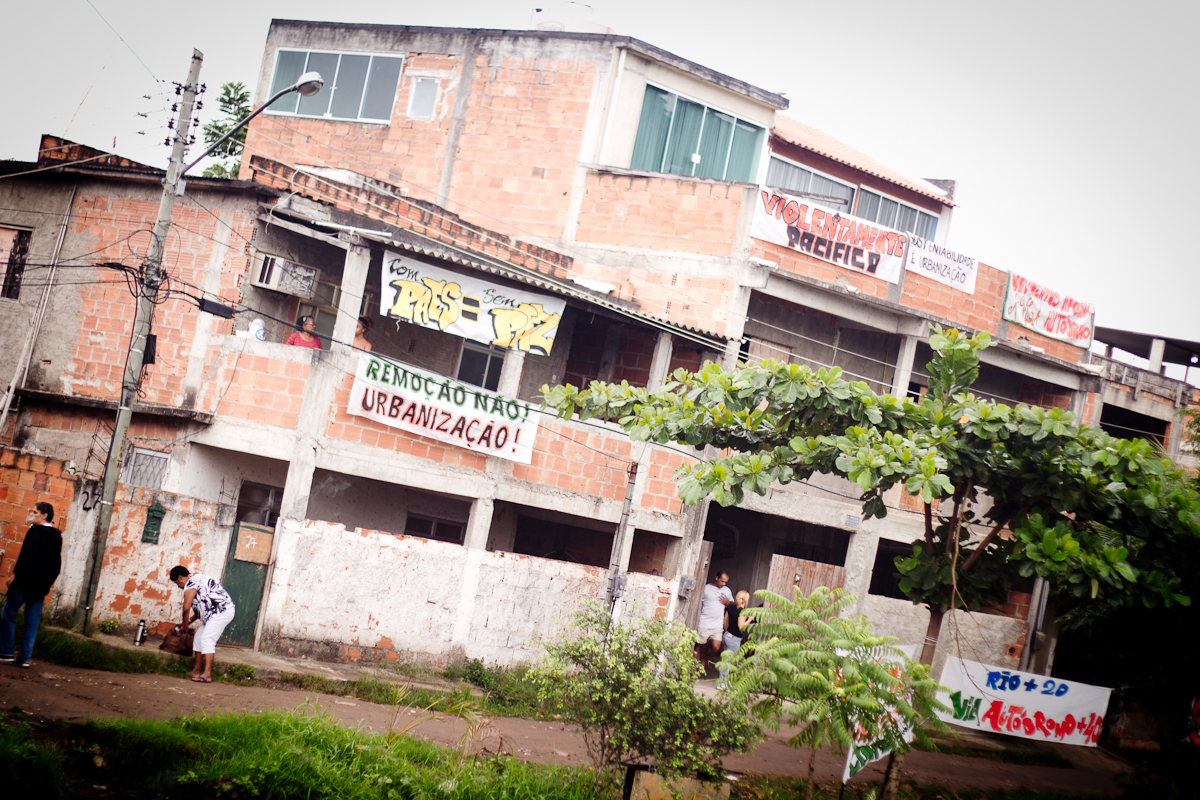
Protests by residents of Vila Autódromo against their removal.

The concept of urban renewal and the elimination of degraded neighborhoods as a method of social reform emerged in Victorian England as a reaction to the increasingly cramped and unsanitary conditions of the urban poor in the rapidly industrializing cities of the 19th century. The agenda that emerged was a progressive doctrine that assumed better housing conditions would reform residents morally and economically. Slum clearance plans were mandated in the United Kingdom by the Housing Act of 1935, while the Housing Act of 1937, a similar American legislation encouraged similar clearance strategies. It can be said that another style of reform, state-imposed for aesthetic and riot control reasons, began in 1853 with the recruitment of Baron Haussmann by Napoleon III for the urban reforms of Paris. The word 'slum' has been used by town planners since the 1890s.

Slum clearance is still practiced today in various situations. During major international events, such as conferences and international sports competitions, governments are known to forcibly clear low-income residential areas as a strategy to impress international visitors and reduce the visibility of the host cities' apparent poverty, a recent and notorious example being the removal of Vila Autódromo during the construction of the Rio de Janeiro's Olympic Park. Other attempts at slum clearance have occurred due to other motivations, such as the suppression of political opposition or attempts to keep certain communities under control.

== Criticism ==
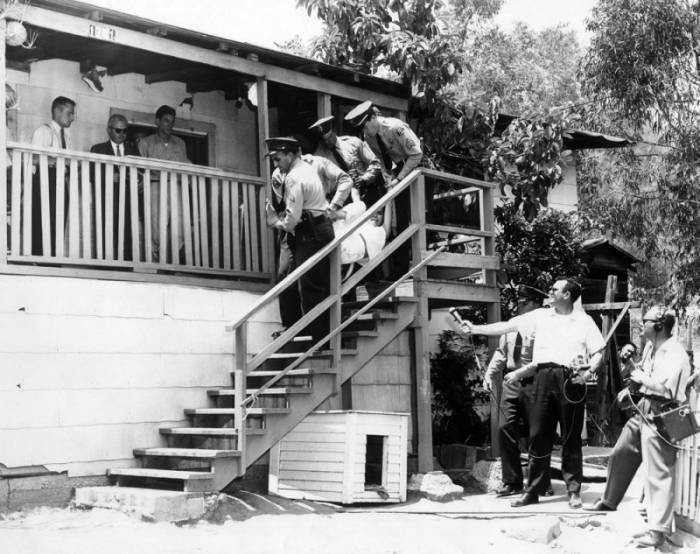
The Battle of Chavez Ravine was a conflict in 1950s Los Angeles, when the city designated the predominantly Mexican-American community a "slum" and proceeded with expropriation and forced removal for the construction of the Dodger Stadium.

Critics argue that forced slum clearance tends to ignore the social problems that cause slums. Poor families who may fall below the income threshold to afford replacement low-income housing, often families including children and working adults, need a place to live when adequate low-income housing is too expensive for them. Furthermore, informal settlements are often sites of informal economies that provide jobs, services, and livelihoods otherwise unavailable in the community.

Urban planners Matias Echanove and Rahul Srivastava argue that many aspects of informal settlements, namely the decentralized, mixed-use, and cohesive urban environment, are aspects worth preserving. It is argued that slum upgrading (economic integration, infrastructure assistance) is partly responsible for the rapid economic success of Tokyo. Slum clearances do not remove the slum itself, and neglecting the needs of the community or its population does not eliminate the causes that create and maintain slums.

Similarly, plans to clear slums in various non-Western contexts have proven ineffective without sufficient housing and other support for displaced communities. Academics describe these strategies as harmful in Nigeria, where the destruction of slums puts even more pressure on the already scarce housing stock, in some cases creating new slums in other parts of the community. Zimbabwe's Operation Murambatsvina was widely criticized by the international community, including a scathing UN report citing human rights violations along with flawed program design, estimated to have displaced at least 700,000 residents of informal settlements.

== Alternatives ==
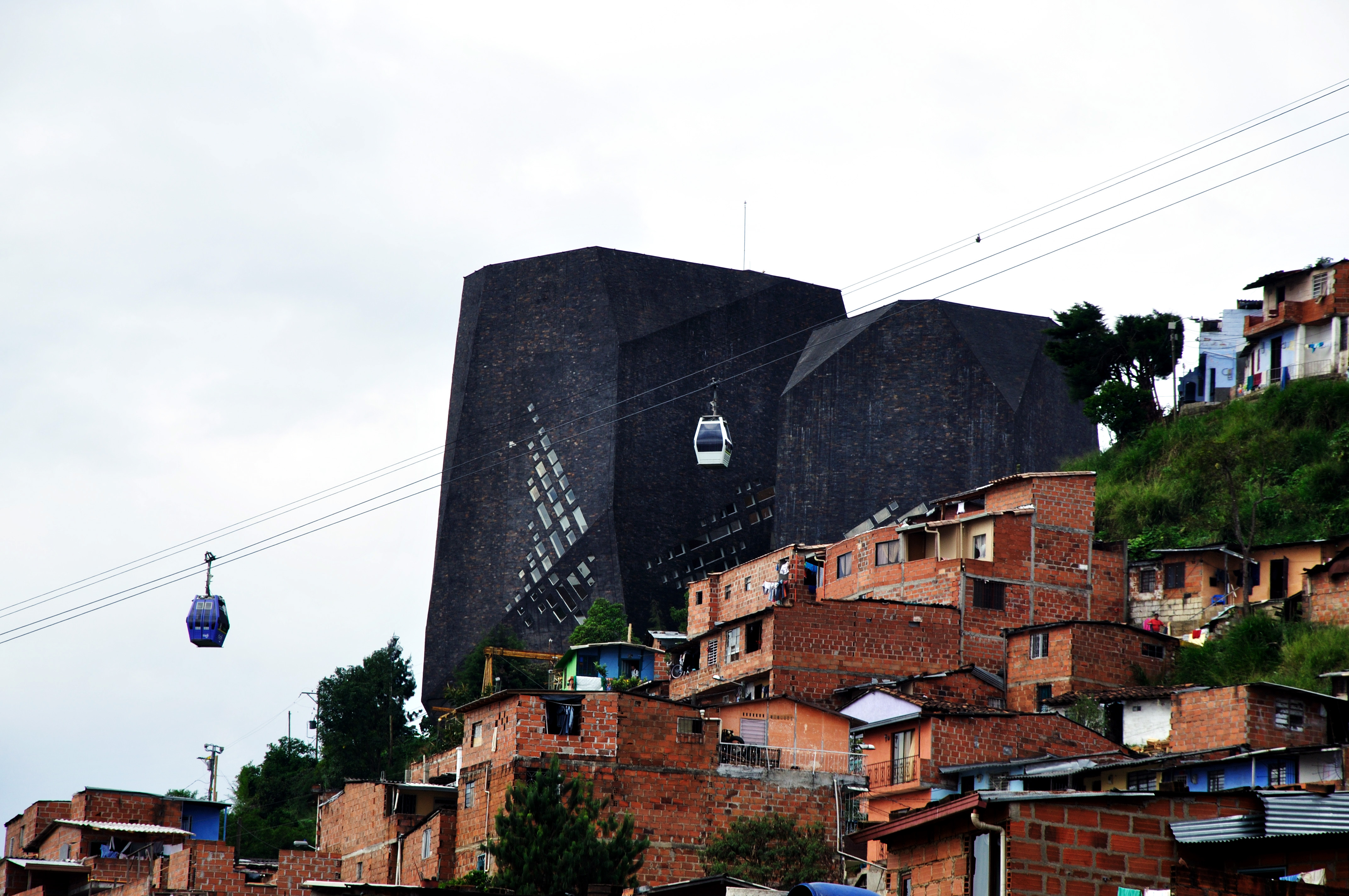
The Metrocable and the Parque Biblioteca España, symbols of slum upgrading in Medellín.

Slum upgrading, also known as slum revitalization or slum improvement, is an integrated approach aimed at reversing the trends of decline in an area. These trends of decline can be legal (land tenure), physical (infrastructure), social (such as crime or education), or economic. The main goal of slum upgrading is to transform slums into functional neighborhoods that meet the social needs of the community and improve integration into the formal urban economy.

Slum improvement is a term used primarily for projects inspired or contracted by entities like the World Bank and similar agencies. It is considered by its proponents a necessary and important component of urban development in developing countries. Many slums lack basic services from local authorities, such as the provision of potable water, sewage systems, sanitation, and solid waste management.

Governments around the world are opting for the strategy of "slum upgrading" as an alternative solution to slum clearance, aiming to improve the quality of services and infrastructure to match the community developed within the slum. A leading example from Brazil is the Favela-Bairro program, conceived by architect Luiz Paulo Conde, which began in 1995.

== See also ==
- Shanty town
- Tenement
- Slum
- Operation Murambatsvina
- Urban planning
- Slum clearance in South Africa
- Slum clearance in India
- Slum clearance in the United States
- Slum clearance in the United Kingdom
- Urban renewal
- Urban revitalization
- Haussmann's renovation of Paris
- Slum upgrading
- Urbanism
- Urbicide
