= Cheeta Camp =

- suburb
- Location within Mumbai
- Coordinates: 19.03°N 72.94°E
- Country: India
- State: Maharashtra
- District: Mumbai Suburban
- Metro: Mumbai
- Zone: 5
- Ward: M East
- Time zone: UTC+5:30 (IST)
- Postal code: 400088

Cheeta Camp (also known as Cheetah Camp) is a low-lying area near Trombay, Mumbai, Maharashtra. It is a part of Municipal M-East Ward and located along the Arabian Seafront.

Brihanmumbai Municipal Corporation provides several public services such as hospitals, schools, cleanup, etc.

== History ==
In 1976, between 55,000 and 70,000 people were forcibly moved overnight to Cheeta Camp from the Janata Colony slum by 12,000 police. The surprise eviction of Janata Colony was to make space for the expansion of the Bhabha Atomic Research Centre (BARC).

In 2001, the Indian Navy raised concerns that the slum was too close to an arms depot. At this time, it was estimated there were 10,000 shacks in Cheeta Colony. There were five schools, a graveyard, a crematorium and four toilet blocks were being built. As per the current estimate more than 1 Lakh people live in the cheeta camp. The development in this area is restricted and the navy depot which reside in the north to the cheeta camp raised concerns regarding the building infrastructure's Floor levels and were limited to two floors and the ownership of the land is limited to the owner and the government can shift them as they did in 2001.

== Geography ==
Trombay is a nearby village and post office. It comes under Anushakti Nagar Assembly Constituency.

This area is majorly covered by Slums and Chawls. Areas in Cheeta Camp is further divided into Sectors. Peoples with different religions and cultures are residing here.

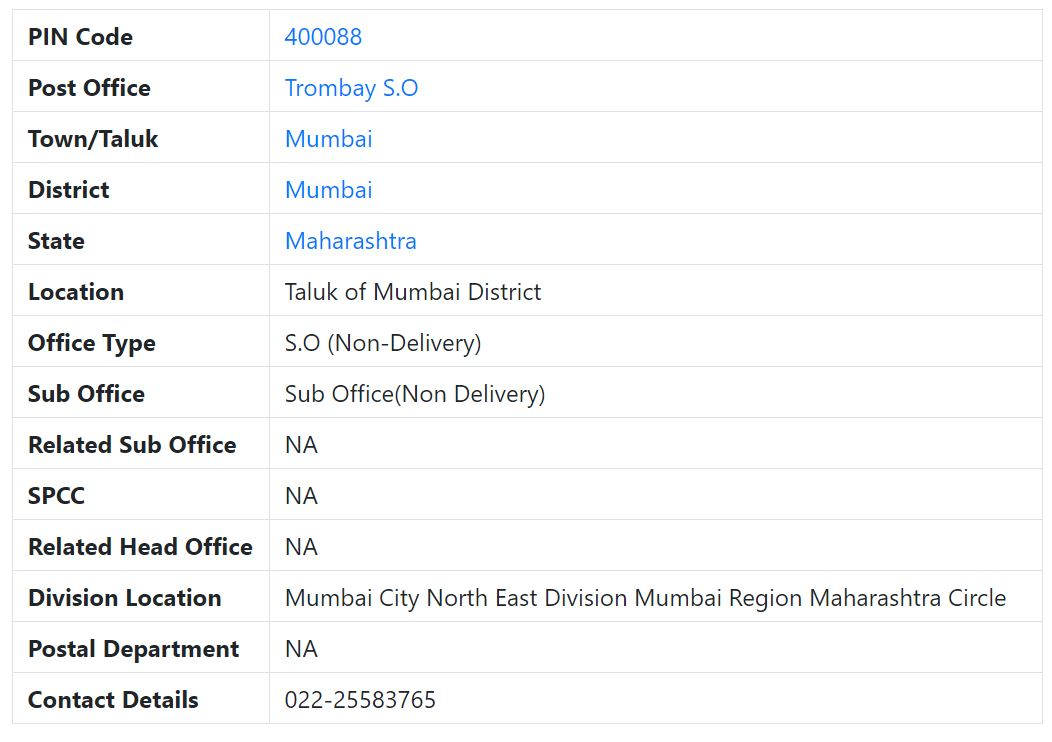

== Schools and Colleges in Cheeta Camp ==
- Vivekananda English High School
- Sir Sayed English High School
- Trombay Public High School
- Devi Ekveera Shikshan Mandal Vidya Sankul
- Ideal High School and Junior College
- Municipal Corporation Schools
- Peace Public School
- Star English High School
- Abhinav Dnyanmandir Trombay School
- Crescent High School
- Queen Mary Pre Primary

== News ==
The 3D vision of Cheeta Camp

== See also ==
- Lalubhai Compound
- Deonar dumping ground
- Mankhurd
