= John Mnyika =

Tanzanian politician

Honourable John Mnyika MP

Member of Parliament for Ubungo
- In office November 2010 – November 2015
- Preceded by: Charles N. Keenja
- Succeeded by: Saed Kubenea

Member of Parliament for Kibamba
- In office November 2015 – November 2020
- Succeeded by: Issa Mtemvu

Secretary General of CHADEMA
- Incumbent
- Assumed office 2021
- Preceded by: Dr. Vincent Mashinji

Personal details
- Party: CHADEMA
- Children: 2
- Education: University of Dar-es-Salaam

John John Mnyika is a Tanzanian CHADEMA politician and his party Secretary General.

He was Member of Parliament for Ubungo constituency from 2010 to 2015 and Kibamba constituency from 2015 to 2020.
