= Charles N. Keenja =

Tanzanian politician

Charles N. Keenja (24 December 1940 - 5 August 2021) was a Tanzanian CCM politician and a cabinet Minister.

He was a Member of Parliament in the National Assembly of Tanzania served Ubungo constituency and succeeded by John Mnyika in 2005. He was cabinet Minister of Agriculture and Food Security.

From 1996 to 2000 he was the chairman of Dar es Salaam for which work he received the UN-Habitat Scroll of Honour Award.
