= Sheela Patel =

Indian urban planner

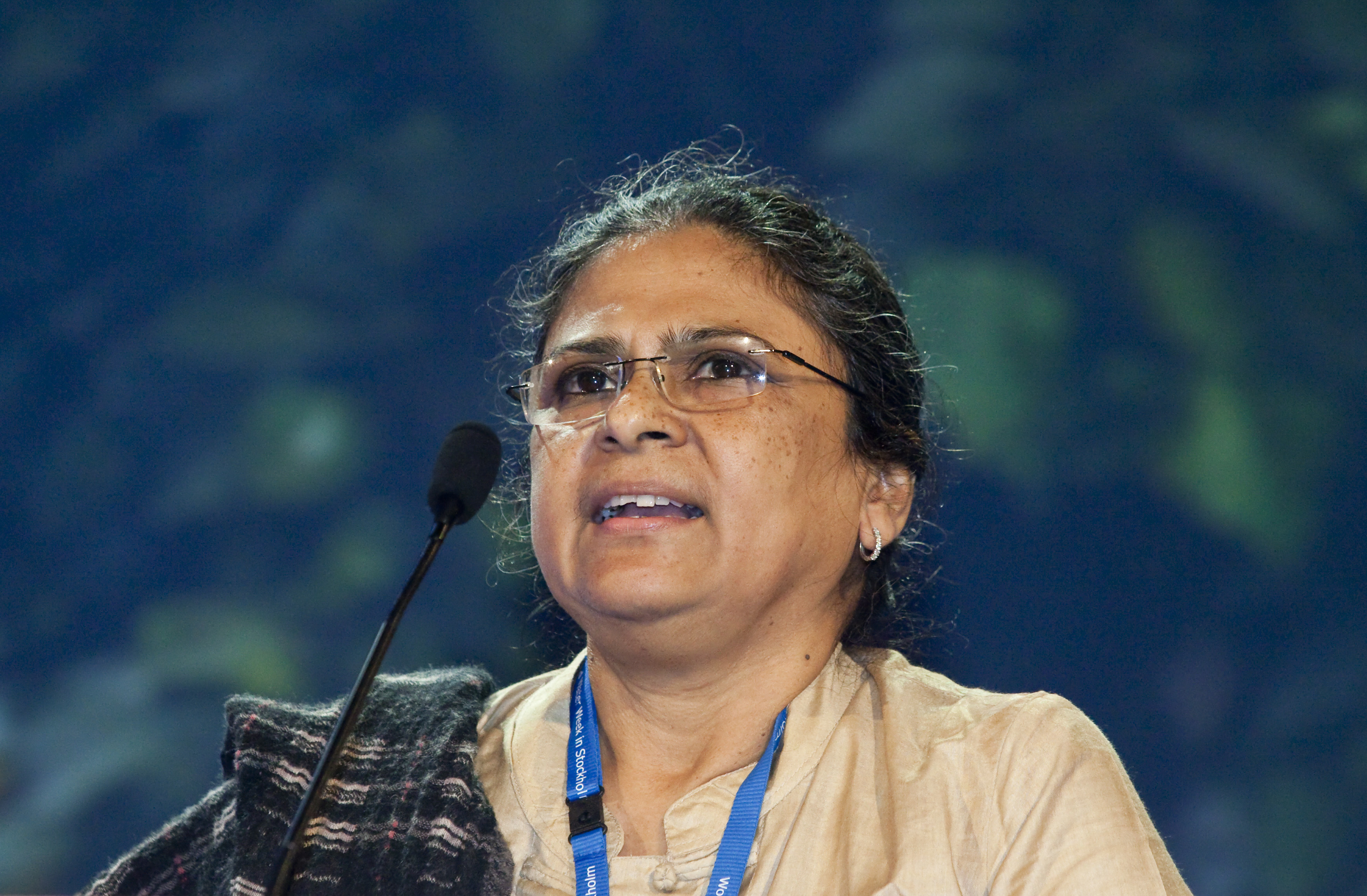
- Patel speaking at the 2011 Opening Plenary of World Water Week
- Born: 1952 (age 73–74)
- Education: Tata Institute of Social Sciences

Sheela Patel (born 1952) is an activist and academic involved with people living in slums and shanty towns.

== Early life ==
In 1974, Patel received her Masters in Social Work from the Tata Institute of Social Sciences in Mumbai. She was then involved with a community centre called the Nagpada Neighbourhood House.

== SPARC ==
With Prema Gopalan, Patel is the founding director of the Society for the Promotion of Area Resource Centres (SPARC), which she set up in Mumbai in 1984 as an advocacy group for the pavement dwellers of Mumbai. SPARC continues to this day to play a major role in the politics of slum development in India and throughout the Third World. In 2000, SPARC was the recipient of the United Nations Human Settlement Award.

== Groups ==
Patel works closely with the National Slum Dwellers Federation (NSDF) and Mahila Milan, two community-based groups working on with the poor in Indian cities. She worked in the National Technical Advisory Group (NTAG) for the Jawaharlal Nehru National Urban Renewal Mission (JNNURM).

She has founded the Asian Coalition for Housing Rights, the Asian Women and Shelter Network and Swayam Shikshan Prayog (SSP), an organisation that works with women's collectives in more than 600 villages in Maharashtra.

Patel is also one of the founders of Slum Dwellers International, a network of community-based organisations in 33 countries spanning Africa, Asia, Latin America and the Caribbean.

== Awards ==
2011: Padma Shri award, the fourth highest civilian honor in India.

2009: David Rockefeller Bridging Leadership Award

2000: UN-Habitat Scroll of Honour Award

2025: In Forbes Global 50 over 50 list

== Selected works ==
- Patel, Sheela; Arputham, Jockin; Bartlett, Sheridan. 2015. '"We beat the path by walking": How the women of Mahila Milan in India learned to plan, design, finance and build housing.' Environment & Urbanization, 28(1) Free access
- Patel, Sheela. 2013. 'Upgrade, Rehouse or Resettle? An Assessment of the Indian Government's Basic Services for the Urban Poor (BSUP) Programme'. Environment & Urbanization, 25(1): 177-188.
- Patel, Sheela. 2012. 'Supporting data collection by the poor' Alliance Magazine
- Patel, Sheela; Baptist, Carrie Baptist; D'Cruz, Celine. 2012. 'Knowledge is power – Informal Communities Assert Their Right to the City through SDI and Community-led Enumerations'. Environment & Urbanization, 24(1).
- Patel, Sheela. 2011. 'Are Women Victims, or Are They Warriors?' in Women's Health and the World's Cities, chapter 6, (eds) Afaf Ibrahim, Meleis, Eugénie L. Birch, Susan M. Wachter, Philadelphia: University of Pennsylvania Press.
- Patel, Sheela. 2011. 'Recasting the Vision of Megacities in the South. Emerging Challenges for the North-South Dialogue in Development', in (ed)Robertson-von Trotha, Caroline Y. (ed.): Europe: Insights from the Outside Kulturwissenschaft interdisziplinär/Interdisciplinary Studies on Culture and Society, Vol 5 Baden-Baden
- Patel, Sheela & Mitlin, Diana. 2010. 'Gender Issues and Slum/Shack Dweller Federations' (report). International Institute for Environment and Development.
- Patel, Sheela; Sheuya, Shaaban; Howden-Chapman, Philippa . 2007. 'The Design of Housing and Shelter Programs: The Social and Environmental Determinants of Inequalities' in Journal of Urban Health, 84(1) 98-108.
- Patel, Sheela; Burra, Sundar; D'Cruz, Celine. 2001 'Slum/Shack Dwellers International (SDI) – Foundations to treetops' in Environment and Urbanization 13(2) 45-59.
