= Institute for Housing and Urban Development Studies =

Coordinates: 51.9159°N 4.5262°E

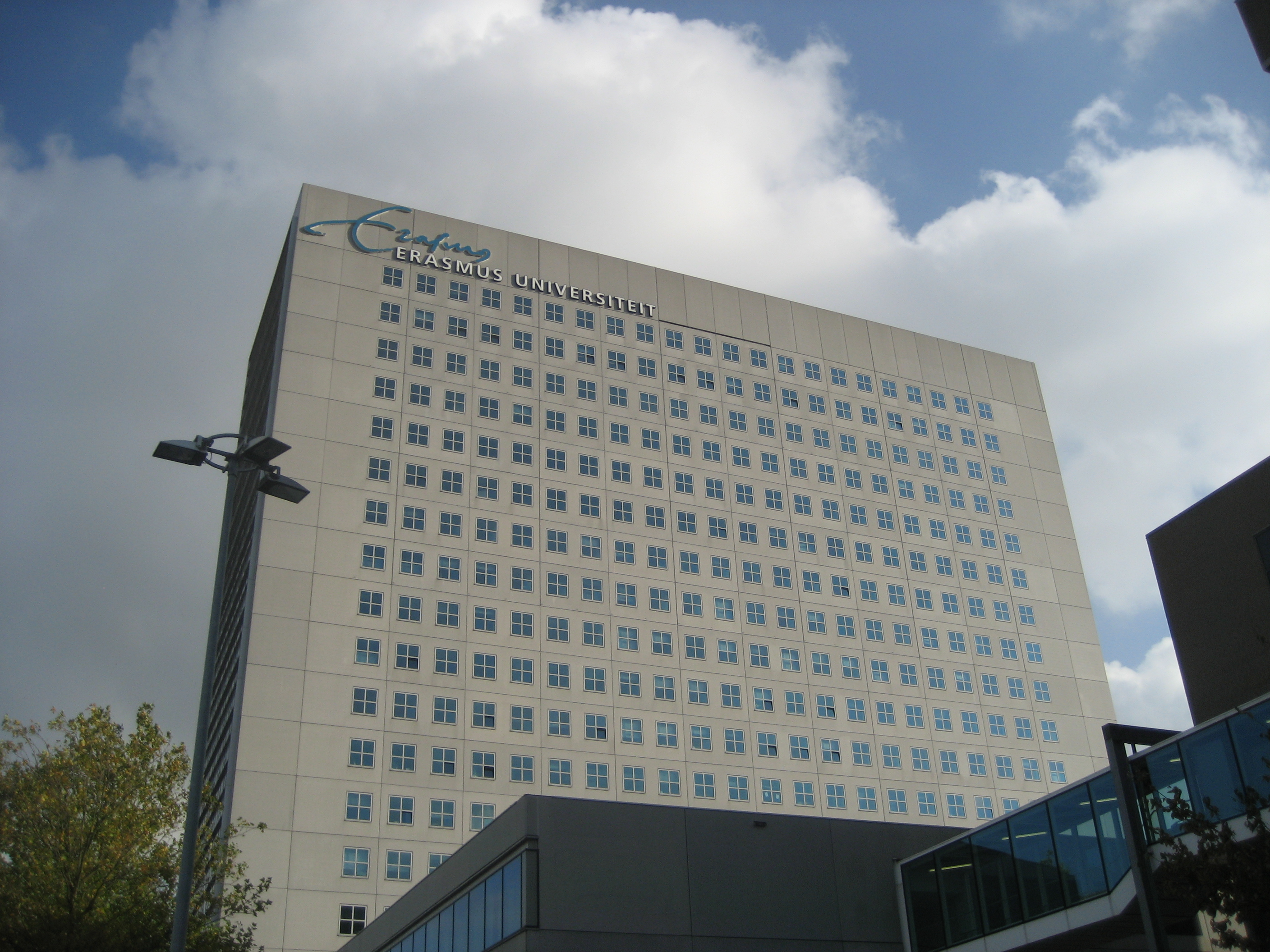
IHS (Erasmus University Rotterdam)

The Institute for Housing and Urban Development Studies (IHS) is an international institute on urban management and housing at Erasmus University Rotterdam, based in the Netherlands. IHS was founded in 1958. It offers post graduate education (master's degree and PhD) and training, advisory services and applied research in the field of urban management, housing and urban planning.

== History ==
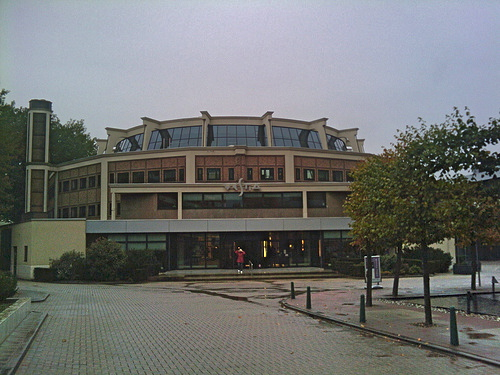
Round building, Kruisplein, Rotterdam

In 1958 Jan van Ettinger Snr., managing director of the Rotterdam-based Bouwcentrum that had been set up to rebuild Rotterdam after the war, established the first International Course on Building (ICB). The objective was to acquaint planners, engineers and architects from developing countries with systematic methods to meet building requirements. In June 1972 ICB's educational activities were transferred to Bouwcentrum International Education (BIE), which remained located in the round building in the heart of Rotterdam. In addition to the standard course available, more and more specialised courses were added to the teaching programme, aimed at mid-career professionals.

In 1982 the BIE changed its name to the Institute for Housing Studies (IHS). The institute redesigned its courses to promote the development of skills to solve problems in their local context. In 1990 the name changed once more to the Institute for Housing and Urban Development Studies, but the acronym IHS remained. At the same time the institute began linking its short courses to a new Master's programme entitled Urban Management. This programme was a collaboration with the Economic Faculty of the Erasmus University Rotterdam and was later replaced by the present Master's Urban Management and Development (UMD). The Master's programme was re-designed as a one-year Master's degree with two specializations.

During the 90s activities overseas intensified. Longer-term institutional development programmes were fostered. IHS established or strengthened more than a dozen international institutions abroad for training, research, and capacity-building. There was also a significant increase in projects involving multilateral and bilateral organizations, including the World Bank, the Asian Development Bank and the Inter-American Development Bank. Cooperation with UN-HABITAT and its various programmes brought the parties involved especially close.

In January 2000 IHS moved premises to a new building on the Woudestein Campus of the Erasmus University Rotterdam. Its activities were reorganized - as they are today - around research, training and education, and advisory services. Both the Municipality of Rotterdam (through the former Rotterdam Development Corporation) and the Erasmus University Rotterdam became stakeholders. Then in 2004, IHS became an independent limited company as part of the EUR Holding BV. Since June 2023 the director of IHS is David Dodman.

In 2018 IHS celebrated its 60th year of activity. By this time the institution has built a strong network of partners all over the world contributing to sustainable urban development. This special year was celebrated by organising the "Empowering Cities and Citizens" conference in Rotterdam in November 2018.

Today, IHS develops human and institutional capacities to reduce poverty and improve the standard of living in cities around the world. IHS has over 13,000 alumni in more than 140 countries.

Currently the institution offers a master programme in collaboration with the Erasmus School of Social & Behavioural Sciences called Urban Governance of Inclusive Sustainable Cities and their flagship master's programme in Global Urban Change with the following 2 specialisations:

- Urban Environment & Climate Change
- Urban Socio-Spatial Transformations

== Education at IHS ==
IHS offers a range of post-graduate programmes from post-graduate certificate and diploma programmes to Master's degree programmes. But also short courses, for example on Urban Management Tools for Climate Change and Sustainable urban Development. The institution also has a 4-year-long PhD programme which fuses urban management with governance. In recent years IHS has offered tailor-made training programmes combining in-country modules and modules in Rotterdam for organisations in South Africa, Cuba, Albania, Brazil, Argentina, Uganda, Indonesia, China, and Yemen. In recent years, IHS organised regional refresher courses addressed to its alumni in South Africa, Thailand, Egypt and Cuba.

== Publications ==
The IHS publishes three series, the Working Paper Seriesin Urban Management, the IHS Project Papers Series and the IHS Thesis Series. The IHS Thesis Series was set up in 2006 as a new publication. Working Papers are preliminary scientific papers and pre-publication versions of academic articles and book chapters. The IHS Project Paper Series allows staff involved in advisory projects to publish project outputs. This series aims to highlight key experiences from projects and innovative methods used on work executed. With the IHS Thesis Series the objective is to publish the best theses of the Master Programme in Urban Management and Development (UMD). The abstracts of the theses are also placed on the IHS website and the full text of the theses are available through the EUR's Institutional Repository: RePub (see http://repub.eur.nl).

== Achievements ==
IHS was selected as the winner for the 2007 UN-Habitat Scroll of Honour Award "for leading the way as a global center of excellence and knowledge through its high quality training programmes in housing, urban management and urban environmental management and planning."
