= Asian Centre for Human Rights =

India-based non-governmental organization

- Type: Non-profit
- Location: Janakpuri, New Delhi, India
- Website: www.achrweb.org

The Asian Centre for Human Rights (ACHR) is a NGO (non-governmental organization) dedicated to the promotion and protection of human rights and fundamental freedoms in Asia. It is headquartered in New Delhi, India. The organization seeks to provide timely and accurate information; conducts investigations, research and campaigns and lobbies about country situations or individual cases. It aims to increase the impact of human rights activists and civil society groups; provide input into international standard-setting processes on human rights; provide political, legal and practical advice. It secures cultural, social, and economic rights through rights-based approaches to international development. The centre maintains a particular focus on India, Sri Lanka, Bangladesh, Nepal, Philippines, Afghanistan, Bhutan, Maldives, Pakistan and Thailand. This organisation was founded by Madahiye Suhas Chakma.
