= Asian Coalition for Housing Rights =

Network of community organisations in Asia

The Asian Coalition for Housing Rights (ACHR) is a network of community organisations in Asia working on issues related to urban poverty, slums and slum upgrading. It champions low-income and other marginalised groups living in cities as experts on urban poverty, and as actors capable of contributing to urban development.

== Aims and practices ==
ACHR focuses on supporting the establishment and development of grassroots organisations of the urban poor, who can effectively advocate on housing and land reform. These organisations are typically formed around neighbourhood-level savings groups. ACHR equips these organisations with technical support, such as architects and urban planners who can help the urban poor to map their living conditions and draw up comprehensive site plans for upgrading or relocation projects. Communities will typically combine their savings in city development funds (CDFs), which allow them to leverage public finance from national and local governments, or even by international donors. This allows communities to take on much larger development projects.

By linking residents of informal settlements at the settlement, city, country and regional scale, ACHR provides a channel for the urban poor to influence policy and programmes. In Thailand, for example, ACHR has helped low-income communities to negotiate land sharing or land leasing arrangements with local authorities and private landowners, and then to access low-cost housing loans and infrastructure subsidies to upgrade their neighbourhoods. The aim is to help landowners capture the commercial value of their land while reducing urban poverty and vulnerability.

ACHR's emphasis on community finance should be distinguished from microfinance. Local groups collectively decide together how to use their savings to meet both public and private aims. The collective financial capital strengthens the group's social capital, and the two grow together. This collective aspect is not present in microfinance, where the emphasis is on individual access to credit and loan repayment, not on achieving collective priorities or addressing the structural issues that cause poverty and exclusion. ACHR has financed exchanges among informal settlements, cities and countries to allow the urban poor to share success stories and lessons learned across Asian cities. This allows successful innovations to be replicated, including city development funds.

== Asian Coalition for Community Action ==
Central to ACHR's work over recent years has been the Asian Coalition for Community Action (ACCA), a fund supporting local organisations through professional exchanges and grants/loans in 165 cities and 19 Asian countries. The ACCA programme enabled the expansion and evolution of savings processes, so that local groups were able to offer more sophisticated financial products: longer-term savings for housing, interest-earning savings accounts, insurance/welfare schemes and loans for both individual livelihoods and community enterprises.

In most countries, the ACCA savings process began with informal groups. However, more formal structures have been developed in many places. In Thailand, the savings groups have had to register as housing cooperatives, while in the Philippines, the savings groups have had to register as homeowners' associations or community associations. In Cambodia, the movement remains unregulated. In all cases, savings networks have sought to collaborate with multiple levels of government to influence land use zoning, service provision and building codes, as well as to negotiate access to land and subsidies.

== Management ==
ACHR was established in 1989. The Secretariat is based in Bangkok. The Secretary General is Somsook Boonyabancha, who was formerly Director of the Community Organizations Development Institute (CODI) in Thailand. ACHR has close ties with the Slum Dwellers International movement, having supported SDI to initiate saving schemes, form local slum federations and establish dialogues with municipal and national governments on issues such as sanitation, water and relocation.
