= National Slum Dwellers Federation =

The National Slum Dwellers Federation (NSDF) in India was established by Jockin Arputham when he fought on behalf of a community of 70,000 to appeal a 1976 eviction order. It is a national organization which brings together multiple communities and their leaders who live in slum settlements around India. NSDF along with Mahila Milan are one of the oldest members of the Urban Poor Fund International Network. Due to the efforts of NSDF, around 90 buildings and 300 toilet blocks have been constructed in Mumbai, providing houses and sanitation to over 35,000 families. Additionally, around 100 toilet blocks have been constructed in Pune.

In the 1980s, NSDF formed an alliance with Mahila Milan and SPARC, and this alliance became the basis for establishing Slum Dwellers International in 1996.

In 1999, National Slum Dwellers Federation won the UN Habitat Scroll of Honour Award.

== Background ==
The National Slum Dwellers Federation was started after the demolition of the Janata Colony in Mumbai. It was one of the largest slums in Mumbai and had mostly a South Indian population. In 1967, the Bhabha Atomic Research Centre gave an eviction notice to all residents to vacate the land. Jockin Arputham, who was 18 years old then, was also a resident. To contest the eviction, the residents had to prove that they were permanent residents and have the right to live there. This colony was formed in 1947 and the rent was anywhere between 50 Indian Paise to 2 Indian Rupees. The documentation proved that this was a permanent settlement and a legal settlement thus the residents were not illegally staying there. By 1970, Jockin was travelling all around Mumbai and India to meet other slum leaders and dwellers to help fight the eviction order. All the activists involved worked to make sure that eviction notices could not be served. However, when the eviction notices were finally ordered, the activists went to the district court and won. The Atomic Energy Commission took it to the High Court and won. Finally, the case was taken to the Supreme Court and the activists won. However, then Prime Minister Indira Gandhi was personally interested in that land and one Supreme Court judge, while speaking to Jockin, mentioned how it is too late to stop the eviction due to the Prime Minister. After a long while, a meeting was conducted with Indira Gandhi and a conclusion was reached that there will be no demolition of the slums without the consultation of the slum dwellers and their leaders. Yet, due to the National Emergency declared by Indira Gandhi, fresh eviction orders were given and an arrest warrant for the slum leaders was also issued. A huge demolition took place, and all 70,000 people were moved to Cheetah camp.

In 1975, the NSDF was formed and multiple slums around India followed this example and formed their own committees.
