= UN-Habitat Scroll of Honour Award =

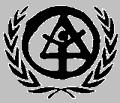
UN-Habitat Scroll of Honor Award

The UN-Habitat Scroll of Honour Award was created by the United Nations Centre for Human Settlements (UNCHS) in 1989 to encourage and recognize the countries, governments, organizations, and individuals who have made great contributions to the development of housing. It is the most prestigious human settlements award in the world by the United Nations, given by the United Nations Human Settlements Programme (UN-Habitat), and has recognized 192 initiatives since its launch in 1989.

The aim of the award is to honour and acknowledge initiatives which have made outstanding contributions in the field of human settlements, provision of housing, highlighting the plight of people living in poverty or who have been displaced, developing, and improving human settlements and the quality of urban life to leave no one behind echoing the Sustainable Development Goals 2030 with emphasis on Goal 11: Sustainable Cities and Communities.

The award, a plaque engraved with the name of the winner, is handed over at the Global Observance of the World Habitat Day, the day the United Nations has set aside to remind the world that we all have the power and the responsibility to reflect on the state of our cities and towns and to shape the future. World Habitat Day was established in 1985 by the United Nations General Assembly through Resolution 40/202 and was first celebrated in 1986.

== Eligibility ==
Individuals, organizations, the private sector, government, non-governmental, bilateral and multi-lateral aid agencies dealing with sustainable projects which have had great impact in society, and any Habitat Agenda partner who has improved the lives of people can be nominated for the UN-Habitat Scroll of Honour.

== Evaluation criteria ==
A Committee comprising from UN-Habitat experts and senior management makes the initial assessment of the nominations and submissions of the candidates and verify that the submission conforms to the standards outlined in the guidelines. After strict reviewing and screening materials of all the candidates, the United Nations Human Settlements Programme chooses the winners. In the past, every year the number of awards by the United Nations Human Settlements Programme depends, generally below ten. Since 2018 only five winners, ideally from each Region of the world, are selected. Past winners are outstanding in the international, regional or national level of human living and have extensive influences. On every World Habitat Day, the United Nations Human Settlements Programme will hold the award ceremony in a prior selected city.

== Winners ==
Each year, the United Nations Human Settlements Programme receives a large number of projects nominated by governments after selection. Recommended candidates can be government organizations or agencies, individuals, or projects, and initiatives can address any aspects of human settlements, such as housing, infrastructure, urban renewal, sustainable human settlements development, or post-disaster reconstruction.

=== 2026 ===
Awards were given to the following:

Winner	Awarded For	Country
Housing NOW	"For its pioneering contribution to advancing adequate, affordable and resilient housing for communities affected by conflict, displacement, poverty and disasters in Myanmar."	Myanmar
Abdelmalek Ghannem	"For his pioneering construction solutions that transform local and mining residues into innovative, affordable and climate-resilient building materials."	Tunisia
Aldeia do Espraiado - Tekoa Ara Hovy	"For establishing Brazil’s first municipal Indigenous village and providing secure, culturally appropriate housing, essential services and legal land tenure."	Brazil
Punjab Housing and Town Planning Agency	"For its significant contribution to expanding access to adequate, safe and affordable housing for low-income households."	Pakistan
Sadiq Khan	"For his leadership in advancing affordable and sustainable housing as well as inclusive and climate-resilient urban development in London."	United Kingdom of Great Britain and Northern Ireland

=== 2025 ===
Awards were given to the following:

Winner	Awarded For	Country
Smart Israel	"For his transformative 'Hydroponic Farm-in-a-Box' innovation, which exemplifies an inclusive, circular, and climate-smart approach to sustainable urban food systems and resilient community livelihoods"	Nigeria
Just a Change	"For combating housing poverty illustrated by its mission to 'Renovate Homes, Rebuild Lives, and Restore Dignity' across vulnerable communities"	Portugal
Public Works Studio	"For its pioneering commitment to spatial justice and housing rights demonstrated by its innovative 'Housing Monitor' initiative empowering vulnerable communities"	Lebanon
Clara Marina Brugada Molina	"For her visionary, participatory approach to urban regeneration and social justice exemplified by her 'UTOPIAS' model of inclusive community spaces"	Mexico

=== 2024 ===
Awards were given to the following:

Winner	Awarded For	Country
Ville de Rabat	"For its pioneering approach to integrated and sustainable urban development, exemplified by its 'Rabat a Sustainable and Inclusive City' vision"	Kingdom of Morocco
Alcaldía de Santiago de Cali	"For addressing urban and housing challenges by transforming public spaces, legalizing informal settlements, and promoting sustainable development"	Colombia
Majlis Bandaraya Ipoh	"For its efforts to transition the city from a resource-intensive economy to a regenerative model focused on health, waste management, and ecotourism while aligning with the Sustainable Development Goals"	Malaysia
Allen Kong	"For his pioneering work in socially and environmentally sustainable architecture, mentorship, and leadership in inclusive design through global programmes and indigenous advocacy"	Australia
David Satterthwaite	"For revolutionizing urban development by advocating for improved housing and living conditions for marginalized urban residents."	United Kingdom

=== 2023 ===
Awards were given to the following:

Winner	Awarded For	Country
Fundación Pro Empleo Productivo A.C.	"For developing training programmes that promote job creation and improve economic productivity in cities"	Mexico
Dubai Municipality	"For establishing and implementing the Fat, Oil and Grease Waste Recycling Programme (FOG) to deal with waste material from the hospitality industry"	United Arab Emirates
FICA (Fundo Imobiliário Comunitário para Alaguel)	"For its action devoted to fighting housing speculation and gentrification in central areas of three major cities in Brazil"	Brazil
Assembleia de Moradores	"For creating city-wide social, economic and environmental development solutions for all residents through facilitating relations between the City of Braga, the municipal housing company and the social housing beneficiaries of the City of Braga"	Portugal
EcoVironment	"For tackling the critical issue of plastic pollution and its detrimental impact on the urban environment"	Sierra Leone

=== 2022 ===
Awards were given to the following:

Winner	Awarded For	Country
The 15'min City global initiative	"For offering a compelling model of sustainable urban development"	Global
Mr. Stanley Anigbogu	"For pioneering simple technology to recycle waste and create energy for marginalized communities"	Nigeria
Ms. Dipti Mahapatro, Bhubaneswar	"For leadership in transforming a mass rapid transit system to make it inclusive and accessible"	India
Programa Parceria, Recife	"For efforts in reducing disaster risks, enhancing resilience and improving infrastructure in favelas"	Brazil
URBAN Intergroup of the European Parliament	"For enabling legislation, policies, and finance for sustainable urban development"	European Parliament

=== 2021 ===
Awards were given to the following:

Winner	Awarded For	Country
New Urban Communities Authority (NUCA)	"For its role in providing safe, affordable social housing projects in Egypt"	Egypt
Shining Hope for Communities (SHOFCO)	"For being a leading example of a community-led change to eradicate extreme poverty in Kenya’s urban slums"	Kenya
Baoji City	"For its innovative housing provision project benefiting low and middle-income residents in Baoji City"	China
Let's Do It! World (LDIW)	"For organizing three World Cleanup Days (WCD) to tackle the global waste crisis and reduce carbon emissions"	Estonia
Ciudad Emergente (CEM)	"For its innovative approach on piloting a Shared Streets concept (Calles Compartidas) for low carbon cities"	Chile

=== 2020 ===
Awards were given to the following:

Winner	Awarded For	Country
Upcycle Africa	"For transforming lives through affordable housing provision, waste education and job opportunities"	Uganda
Subang Jaya Municipal Council	"For its holistic and integrated approach to affordable housing and community empowerment"	Malaysia
Community Impact Nepal, Kathmandu	"For empowering entrepreneurs to produce eco-friendly constructions for families in substandard housing"	Nepal
Ministry of Housing and Cities	"For its leadership in the development of an urban policy that promotes sustainable housing and cities putting housing at the centre"	Colombia
ECOCASA	"For addressing energy-efficient construction standards for housing, facilitating inclusive access to financial mechanisms and creating decent homes"	Mexico

=== 2018 ===
Awards were given to the following:

Winner	Awarded For	Country
Xuzhou City, Jiangsu Province	"For promoting holistic and broad-based approaches to ecological restoration through intelligent waste-management"	China
National Action Plan for the Implementation of the New Urban Agenda in Cuba 2017-2036: Institute of Physical Planning	"For implementing positive urban and territorial change through the integration and implementation of the principles of the New Urban Agenda"	Cuba
Tri Rismaharini, Mayor of Surabaya City	"For implementing people-centred and inclusive city regeneration and development initiatives prioritizing low-income residents to ensure they are not left behind"	Indonesia
Isaac 'Kaka' Muasa, Chairman of Mathare Environmental Conservation Youth Group	"For harnessing the potential of disadvantaged youth and inspiring community-wide involvement in solid waste management"	Kenya
Presented Posthumously in Memory of Dr. Mona A. Serageldin (1938 – 2018), Vice President: Institute for International Urban Development (I2UD) (2005 – 2018)	"For promoting practical research-based approaches to address a broad spectrum of development challenges in a wide range of settings"	United States

=== 2013 ===
Awards were given to the following:

Winner	Awarded For	Country
UPP Social Programme (Municipality of Rio de Janeiro)	"For advancing the promotion of urban, social and economic development in the favelas of Rio de Janeiro"	Brazil
People's Government of Shouguang	"For improvements in infrastructure, transport and traffic systems"	China
Ministry of Urban Development and Construction of Ethiopia	"For its groundbreaking Cobblestone - Youth Job Creation Initiative"	Ethiopia
Suwon	"For its citizen-initiated governance and participatory urban planning and budgeting"	Korea
Community-Led Infrastructure Finance Facility	"For enabling organizations of the urban poor to access greater resources"	United Kingdom

=== 2012 ===
Awards were given to the following:

Winner	Awarded For	Country
The São Paulo Slum Upgrading Programme of the Municipal Housing Secretariat (SEHAB)	"For implementing one of the largest slum upgrading projects in Brazil"	Brazil
The Special Council Support Fund for Mutual Assistance (FEICOM)	"For assisting municipalities in achieving the Millennium Development Goals (MDGs), including efforts on clean water, access to education and health facilities"	Cameroon
Anji County	"For transforming Anji city into one of the world's greenest citie"	China
Olusegun Mimiko, Governor of Ondo State	"For the drive to reduce urban poverty and make Ondo the best-run State in the country."	Nigeria
Muchadeyi Masunda, Mayor of Harare	"For 10 years charismatic leadership and courageous promotion of ethical governance in a city stressed by socio-economic, political and service delivery problems"	Zimbabwe

=== 2011 ===
Awards were given to:

Winner	Country
Wintringham Specialist Aged Care	Australia
Centro de Investigacion y Desarrollo de Estructuras y Materiales (CIDEM)	Cuba
Stormwater Management and Road Tunnel (SMART) by MMC-Gamuda	Malaysia
Edith Mbanga of the Shack Dwellers Federation for Namibia	Namibia
Yakutsk City Administration	Russia
Austin Energy Green Building	United States

=== 2010 ===
Winner	Country
Vienna (Municipal)'s Sustainable Urban Renewal Programme	Austria
Kunshan Municipal People's Government	China
City of Medellin	Colombia
Ministry of Housing and Urban Development of Morocco and the Al Omrane Group	Morocco
Housing and Development Board (HDB)	Singapore
Johannesburg Social Housing Company (JOSHCO)	South Africa

=== 2009 ===
The award recipients came from diverse backgrounds and contents:

Winner	Country
Peter Oberlander	Canada
Un Techo Para Mi Pais	Chile
Rizhao Municipal Government	China
CEMEX	Mexico
The city of Grozny	Russia
The Saudi Al-Medina Al Munawarah Local Urban Observatory	Saudi Arabia
The Seoul Metropolitan Government (Special Citation)	Republic of Korea
Jan Peterson of Huairou Commission	United States of America
The Alexandra Renewal Project	South Africa
The City of Malmö	Sweden
Uganda Women's Efforts to Save Children (UWESO)	Uganda
Neal Peirce, Journalist	United States of America

=== 2008 ===
Winner	Country
Nanjing Municipal Government (Special Citation)	China
The ancient canal city of Shaoxing in Zhejiang Province	China
The bustling port city of Zhangjiagang in Jiangsu Province	China
The City of Bugulma in the Tatarstan Republic of Western Russia	Russia
The Capital of Rwanda, Kigali	Rwanda
Ciudad Juarez, a major Mexican city on the United States border	Mexico

=== 2007 ===
Winner	Country
The Nanning Municipal People's Government	China
Eusebio Leal Spengler, Historian of the City of Havana	Cuba
The Institute for Housing and Urban Development Studies	The Netherlands
Lieutenant-General Nadeem Ahmed, Deputy Chairman, Earthquake Reconstruction and Rehabilitation Authority	Pakistan
The Palestinian Housing Council (PHC)	Palestinian National Authority
Russia, the Stavropol City Administration's project	Russian Federation
The Mwanza Rural Housing Programme	United Republic of Tanzania

=== 2006 ===
Winner	Country
The National Cities Conference Programme, Ministry of Cities	Brazil
The Yangzhou Municipal People's Government	China
The French firm Veolia Environment	France
The Government of Alexandria	Egypt
Cardinal Renato Martino, President of the Pontifical Council for Justice and Peace	Italy
Pag IBIG Fund	The Philippines
Federation Yaroslavl City Administration	Russian Federation
H.H. Shaikh Khalifa Bin Salman Al-Khalifa (Special Citation), The Prime Minister of The Kingdom of Bahrain	Kingdom of Bahrain

=== 2005 ===
Winner	Country
Rose Molokoane	South Africa
The Municipality of Kazan City	Russia
Sarvodaya Shramandana Movement	Sri Lanka
Professor Johan Silas	Indonesia
Jakarta Metropolitan City	Indonesia
North Sumatra Governor Tengku Rizal Nurdin (posthumous)	Indonesia
King Carl XVI Gustaf of Sweden (Special Citation)	Sweden

=== 2004 ===
Winner	Country
Xiamen Municipal People's Government	China
Centre for Development Communication	India
President Joaquim Chissano (Special Citation)	Mozambique
The Big Issue magazine	United Kingdom
Prime Minister Rafic Hariri (Special Citation)	Lebanon

=== 2003 ===
Winner	Country
Margaret Catley-Carlson	Canada
Weihai Municipal Government	China
German Garcia Duran	Colombia
Nasreen Mustafa Sideek	Iraq
Pamoja Trust	Kenya
Sankie D. Mthembi-Mahanyele	South Africa
Water Supply and Sanitation Collaborative Council	Switzerland
Zena Daysh, Commonwealth Human Ecology Council	UK
Teolinda Bolivar	Venezuela
His Majesty Bhumibol Adulyadej, the King of Thailand (Special Citation)	Thailand

=== 2002 ===
Winner	Country	Motivation
City-to-City cooperation between Nakuru, Kenya and Leuven	Belgium	"For their multifaceted City-to-City Cooperation on sustainable Urban Development."
Brazilian Institute of Municipal Administration	Brazil	"For its continuous support to local government development through training on municipal and urban issues."
Baotou Municipal Government	China	"For outstanding improvements in shelter and the urban environment and successful cooperation with other Chinese cities."
CITYNET based in Yokohama	Japan	"for playing a key role in facilitating C2C and networking amongst local governments, NGOs and development agencies in Asia."
Dutch Habitat Platform	The Netherlands	"for coordinating the Habitat Agenda and linking municipalities in the Netherlands with their partners in developing countries."
Mayor Joan Clos	Spain	"for his outstanding commitment and contribution to global cooperation between local authorities and the United Nations."
ENDA Tiers Monde, Dakar	Senegal	"for promoting alternative development options at a local level, reducing poverty and advocating housing rights."
René Frank	USA	"for his dedication to low-cost housing as a leading member of the International Real Estate Federation (FIABCI)."
John Hodges (Special Citation)	United Kingdom	"for his contribution to poverty elimination and sustainable urban development in South Asia and sub-Saharian Africa."

=== 2001 ===
Winner	Country
Hangzhou Municipal Government	China
Pastora Nuez Gonzalez	Cuba
Bremer Beginenhof Modell	Germany
Fukuoka City	Japan
Father Pedro Opeka	Madagascar
Centre on Housing Rights and Eviction	Switzerland
Television Trust for the Environment (TVE), UK Asiaweek Magazine	UK
The Cooperating Committee for Japan Habitat Fukuoka Office (Special Citation)	Japan

=== 2000 ===
Winner	Country
Ana Vasilache	Romania
Caroline Pezzullo	USA
Jacqueline daCosta	Jamaica
Women and Peace Network	Costa Rica
Mary Jane Ortega	Philippines
International Union of Local Authorities	based in the Netherlands
Sheela Patel	India
Charles N. Keenja	Tanzania
Mmatshilo Motsei	South Africa

=== 1999 ===
Winner	Country
Habiba Eid	Egypt
Bo Xilai Mayor of Dalian	China
National Slum Dwellers Federation	India
Alvaro Villota Berna	Colombia
President Rudolf Schuster	Slovak Republic
Pierre Laconte	Belgium
Millard Fuller	USA
Hon. Kwamena Ahwoi	Ghana
Operation Firimbi	Kenya

=== 1998 ===
Winner	Country
Programa de Mobilizaco de Comunidades	Brazil
Fu-Nan River Comprehensive Revitalization Project	Chengdu, China
Mayor Mu Suixin, Mayor of Shenyang	China
Forum Européene pour la Sécurité Urbaine	France
Prof. Akin L. Mabogunje	Nigeria
Valdimir A. Kudryavtsev	Russia
Association des Habitants del Mourouje	Tunisia

=== 1997 ===
Winner	Country
Sen. Oscar Lopez Velarde Vega	Mexico
Mother Center Stuttgart	West Germany
South African Homeless Peoples Federation	South Africa
Mayor Huang Ziqiang	China
Reinhard Goethert and Nabeel Hamdi	USA/United Kingdom
Federation of Canadian Municipalities	Canada
Peter Elderfield (Special Citation)	United Kingdom
Radinal Moochtar, Minister of Public Works (Special Citation)	Indonesia

=== 1996 ===
Winner	Country
Hou Jie, Minister of Construction (Special Citation)	China
Peter Kimm (Special Citation)	USA
Mohamed Hashi, Mayor of Hargeisa	Somalia
The late Sidhijai Tanphiphat	Thailand
Ministry of Local Government and Housing	Zambia
The SISCAT Group	Bolivia
Jnos SZAB	Budapest

=== 1995 ===
Winner	Country
Comunidades Programme State Government of Cear	Brazil
Foundation in Support of Local Democracy	Poland
Urban Community Development Office	Thailand
Gangadhar Rao Dattatri	India
Projet de Taza, Agence Nationale de lute contre l'Habitat Insalubre (ANHI)	Morocco
La coopérative des veuves de Save Duhozanye	Rwanda
Shanghai Municipal Housing Project	China
Joe Slovo (deceased)	South Africa

=== 1994 ===
Winner	Country
Qassim Sultan	United Arab Emirates
Bank Tabungan Negara (State Housing Bank of Indonesia)	Indonesia
Programme dHabitat Cooperatif	Senegal
Jorge E. Hardoy (deceased)	Argentina
Housing Development Administration	Turkey

=== 1993 ===
Winner	Country
Cités Unies Development	France
Build Together Programme	Namibia
Anthony Williams Bullard	United Kingdom

=== 1992 ===
Winner	Country
Intermediate Technology Development Group	United Kingdom
Shenzhen Housing Bureau	China
Habitat International Coalition	Mexico
East Wahdat Upgrading Project	Jordan
Earthquake Emergency Reconstruction and Rehabilitation Programme	Nepal
Rural Housing Reconstruction with Appropriate Technologies	Ecuador
Namuwongo Upgrading and Low-Cost Housing	Uganda
New Urban Communities in Egypt	Egypt
World Relief El Salvador Housing Reconstruction Project	El Salvador
Woodless Construction Project	Niger
Laurie Baker	India
Yona Friedman	USA
Mayor Jaime Lerner	Curitiba, Brazil
Rozanov Evgueni Grigorievich	Russian Federation
John F.C. Turner	United Kingdom

=== 1991 ===
Winner	Country
Ministry of Housing and Human Settlements	Costa Rica
Urban Development Authority	Singapore
Cooperative Housing Foundation	USA
National Housing Development Authority	Sri Lanka
Housing and Urban Development Corporation	India
Housing Development Finance Corporation	India
Sengki Land-sharing Project	Thailand
Projet Assistance IECOSAT	Burundi
Institute for Building Materials	Viet Nam
Tamako Nakanishi	Japan
Arch. Leandro Quintana Uranga	Venezuela

=== 1990 ===
Winner	Country
Lord Scarman	United Kingdom
Tangshan Municipal Government	China
Construyamos	Colombia
Craterre	France
Stone Town Conservation and Development Authority	United Republic of Tanzania
Human Settlement Foundation	Thailand
American Society of Clinical Oncology, Chicago, Illinois	USA

=== 1989 ===
Winner	Country
Otto Koenigsberger	United Kingdom
Hassan Fathy	Egypt
Lauchlin Currie	USA
Habitat for Humanity International	USA

== See also ==
- United Nations Human Settlements Programme
