= Slum Dwellers International =

Social movement of the urban poor

- Type: International network / Social movement
- Purpose: Advocacy and support for the urban poor
- Headquarters: Cape Town, South Africa
- Region served: Africa, Asia, and Latin America
- Chairperson: Joseph Muturi
- Website: sdinet.org

Slum/Shack Dwellers International (SDI), is a global social movement of the urban poor that started in 1996. It forms a network of community-based organisations in more than 30 countries across Africa, Asia, Latin America and the Caribbean.

The SDI secretariat is located in Cape Town, South Africa. The current chairperson is Joseph Muturi. Most of SDI's members are poor urban households squatting on the edge of cities in order to access employment possibilities and SDI aims to ensure that the needs of its members are integrated and not marginalised by city administrations.

SDI distributes community-generated data on cities and slums through the 'Know Your City' campaign, which is run in association with United Cities and Local Governments and Cities Alliance.

== Global solidarity ==
SDI's former president Jockin Arputham said in 2012: "Global solidarity of the urban poor has been a long-term dream for many of us in the SDI network. This dream began to take shape in the early 1990s when shack dwellers from South Africa’s informal settlements began to visit pavement dwellers living on the streets of Mumbai. Since those days the network has grown steadily in numbers, in influence and in its impact on the everyday lives of millions of urban poor families. Practical, face-to-face learning remains the main driving force of the SDI network that now stretches from Asia, through Africa to Latin America and the Caribbean. With its women-centred savings collectives at the heart of its practice in 34 countries, SDI is forging a new system of community organising that runs in an unbroken thread from the household to the settlement, from the settlement to the city, from the city to the country and from the country to the global stage."

== Support ==
SDI works closely with the following international agencies: UN Habitat (especially its Global Land Tools Network Program, where SDI co-chairs its International Advisory Board); Cities Alliance (SDI currently serves on its executive committee; Union of Cities and Local Governments (UCLG) with whom it has launched the high-profile Know Your City campaign.; the Santa Fe Institute with whom it is developing a data platform of informal settlement information.

SDI has an advisory board made up of slum dwellers from India, Philippines, Kenya and South Africa, housing or urban development Ministers or high officials from South Africa, Uganda, India, Brazil, Sri Lanka, Norway and Sweden.

SDI'S commitment to work with local and national Governments, bi-lateral and multi-lateral agencies is based on the principle of militant negotiations. This approach comes from a perspective that the problem of urban poverty cannot be addressed at scale without direct collaboration between organised communities of the urban poor and formal actors in the sector, especially local Governments. However certain human rights activists and academics have interpreted this as proof of co-optation by state institutions and international agencies and undermining more rights-based radical social movements. To underscore this critique reference is made to SDI's links to these formal institutions and not to its practice and its outcomes. This includes claims that SDI is supported by a number of prominent World Bank intellectuals such as Arjun Appadurai. Its role on agencies such as Cities Alliance is also cited as proof of a neo-liberal orientation.

Financial support for SDI projects, trans-national learning, global advocacy and the Urban Poor Fund International (UPFI) comes from community savings as well as a range of international donors including but not limited to; Swedish Sida, MFA Norway, the Bill & Melinda Gates Foundation, the Ford Foundation, Misereor and the Skoll Foundation.

== Solidarity ==
As a network of networks of communities of the urban poor, SDI is committed to grassroots solidarity at the global and the national levels. It has partnerships and memoranda of understanding with Habitat for Humanity, and the Association of African Planning Schools. It retains cordial links with other international networks such as WIEGO and the Huairou Commission.

In October 2009, SDI made a statement in solidarity with Abahlali baseMjondolo when a militia affiliated with the ANC attacked the movement in Kennedy Road informal settlement in Durban. Prior to this SDI was accused of supporting the controversial KwaZulu-Natal Elimination and Prevention of Re-emergence of Slums Act, 2007. SDI responded that their working partnership with the Provincial government and the housing department did not mean it supported the Act.

== 'Know Your City' campaign ==
Know Your City brought together slum dwellers and local governments in 103 cities across Africa, Asia and Latin America, covering 1,238 settlements to partner in community-led slum profiling and mapping.

Professor José Lobo, a scientist at Arizona State University and author of a report for the campaign said in 2018: "Slums are not undifferentiated seas of poverty and misery, nor are they ‘problems’ to be fixed. There is a lot of knowledge within poor communities everywhere, and even financial resources to be tapped into (think of savings associations) if the residents are allowed to be involved in the design and implementation of solutions." Researchers from the University of Chicago, Oak Ridge National Laboratory, Sam Houston State University and the Santa Fe Institute were also involved.

== Awards ==
- SDI country affiliates have been awarded the UN Habitat Scroll of Honour: SA Federation (1995), Sheela Patel (2000), Rose Molokoane (2005), Namibia Federation (2013)
- SDI members selected as Ashoka Fellows: Joel Bolnick, Anaclaudia Rossbach, Jane Weru, Andrea Bolnick.
- Celine D Cruz (India) received the Yale World Fellowship in 2003
- Jane Weru (Kenya) has won the Rockefeller Innovations Award in 2011
- Sheela Patel (India) received the David Rockefeller Bridging Leadership Award in 2009
- Sheela Patel received the Padma Shri award, the fourth highest civilian honor in India, in 2011
- Jockin Arputham (India) received the Magsaysay Award in 2000
- Jockin Arputham received the Padma Shri award, the fourth highest civilian honor in India, in 2011
- Jockin Arputham received the Skoll award for Social Entrepreneurship in 2014
- Rose Molokoane (South Africa) won the Outstanding Achievement Award at the Woman of the Year Awards in London in 2007
- In 2014 SDI and Jockin Arputham were nominated for the Nobel Peace Prize.
