= Pavement dwellers =

Informal housing built on footpaths

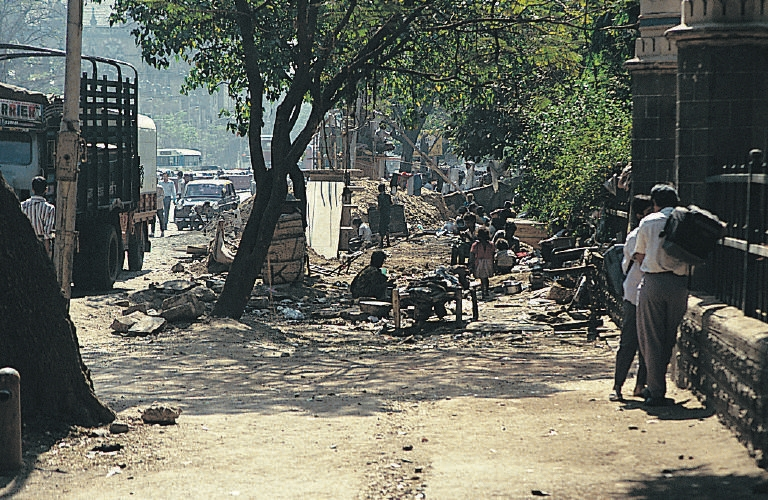
Street dwellers in Mumbai

Pavement dwellers refers to informal housing built on the footpaths/pavements of city streets. The structures use the walls or fences which separate properties from the pavement and street outside. Materials include cloth, corrugated iron, cardboard, wood, plastic, and sometimes also bricks or cement.

== Mumbai ==
According to Sheela Patel of the Society for the Promotion of Area Resource Centers (SPARC), pavement dwellers are primarily first generation migrants who moved to Mumbai as early as the 1940s, and who have lived on the pavement of public roadways ever since. They are completely invisible as far as local, state, and national policies are concerned. People who sleep on or near pavements often pay to keep their belongings in shops, kiosks, or other buildings.

SPARC conducted a study in 1985 called We the Invisible based on a census of about 6,000 households. It showed approximately half of the pavement dwellers to be from the poorest districts in the state of Maharashtra, with the other half from the poorest parts of wider India. Many came as victims of drought, famine, earthquakes, religious persecution or riots. Others came as a result of a complete breakdown in their livelihoods where they had been living. Pavement dwellers migrate to Mumbai hoping to capitalize on the wealth and job opportunities that the city offers. They are typically forward-thinking, seeking to build lives in the city that give the next generation better opportunities than would have been possible in the village.

=== 1985 eviction crisis ===
In 1985, the Supreme Court of India granted the Municipal Corporation of Greater Mumbai authority to demolish household structures on the sidewalks of Mumbai. With the aid of SPARC, the rights of Mumbai's pavement dwellers were recognised and coexistence was successfully negotiated.

== South Africa ==
The Symphony Way Pavement Dwellers were a group of evicted families who lived on a main road in Delft, South Africa, from February 2008 till late 2009, until they were evicted by court order to the Blikkiesdorp resettlement zone.

== Paris ==
Following the eviction of the Calais Jungle in 2016, African migrants began living on the pavements of Paris. The encampments would grow over a period of weeks and the police would evict them.
