= Urban renewal =

Land redevelopment in cities

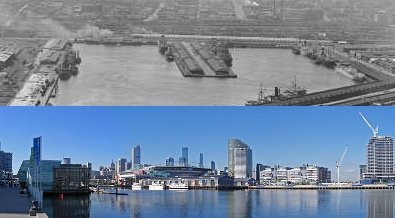
Melbourne Docklands urban renewal project, a transformation of a large disused docks area into a new residential and commercial precinct for 25,000 people

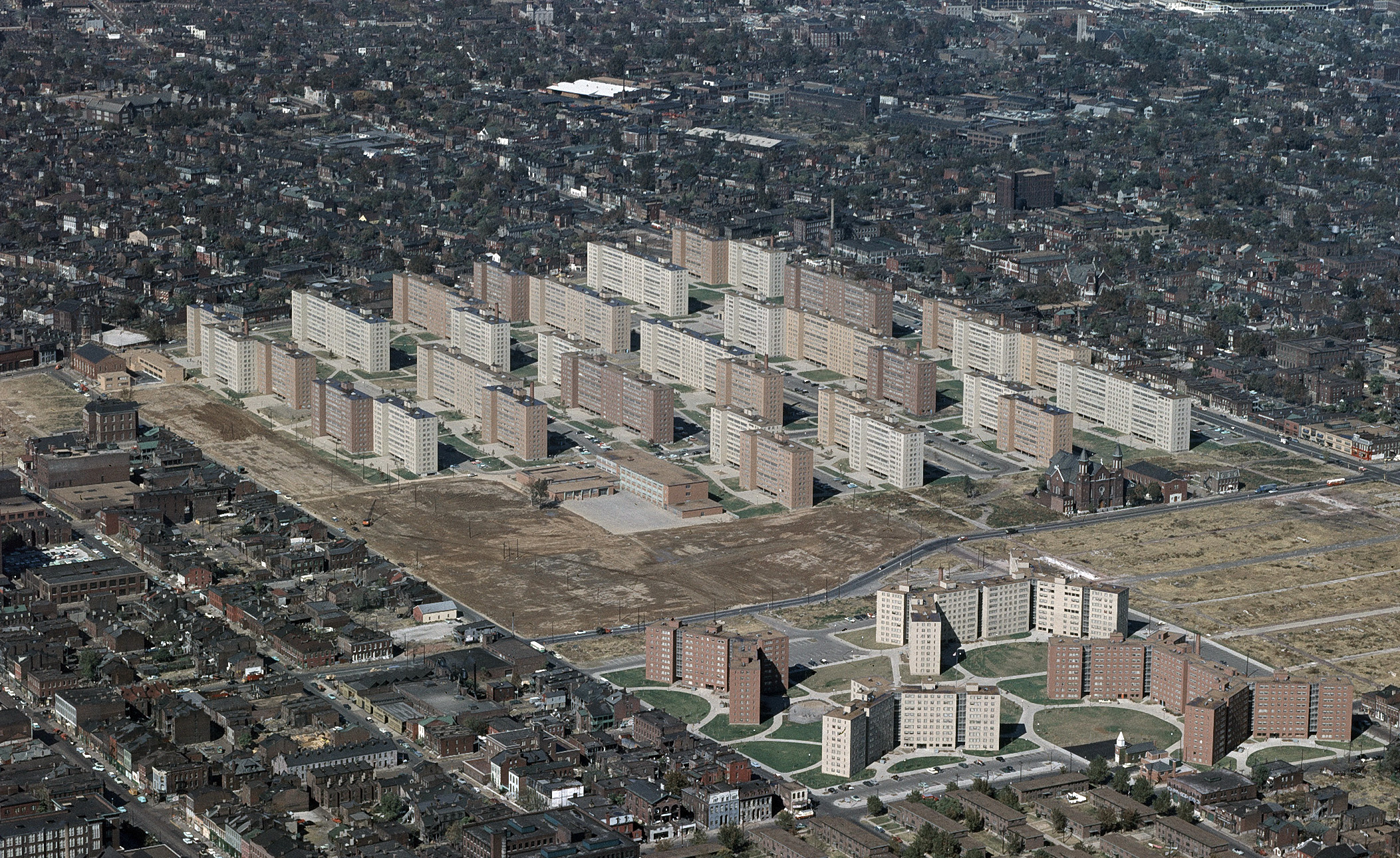
The Wendell O. Pruitt Homes and William Igoe Apartments complex

Urban renewal, also known as urban regeneration or urban redevelopment, is a set of government or private initiatives aimed at addressing urban decay, upgrading infrastructure, and revitalizing city neighborhoods. Typically, urban renewal involves clearing "blighted" areas, followed by new construction for housing, businesses, and public spaces. While such projects can modernize cities and stimulate economic growth, they are controversial due to frequent displacement of low-income and minority communities, an effect sometimes considered gentrification.

== History ==
=== Nineteenth century ===
The concept of urban renewal as a method for social reform emerged in England as a reaction to the increasingly cramped and unsanitary conditions of the urban poor in the rapidly industrializing cities of the nineteenth century. The agenda that emerged was a progressive doctrine that assumed better housing conditions would reform its residents morally and economically. Modern attempts at renewal began in the late nineteenth century in developed nations. However, urban reform imposed by the state for reasons of aesthetics and efficiency had already begun in 1853, with Haussmann's renovation of Paris ordered by Napoleon III.

The City Beautiful Movement was also a type of urban renewal originating from the United States which flourished in the 1890s and 1900s with the intent of beautifying cities. It was a part of the progressive social reform movement in North America under the leadership of the upper-middle class, which was concerned with poor living conditions in major cities. The movement sought to introduce beautiful boulevards and open avenues through cities, to introduce Beaux-Arts and Neoclassical Architecture to cities, and to sanitize them.

=== Twentieth century ===
Modern urban renewal experienced an intense phase in the late 1940s under the rubric of reconstruction. In the context of urban renewal, "reconstruction" typically refers to efforts to rebuild and revitalize cities that were damaged during World War II. This phase involved not just repairing buildings, but also rethinking urban design, infrastructure, and housing policies.

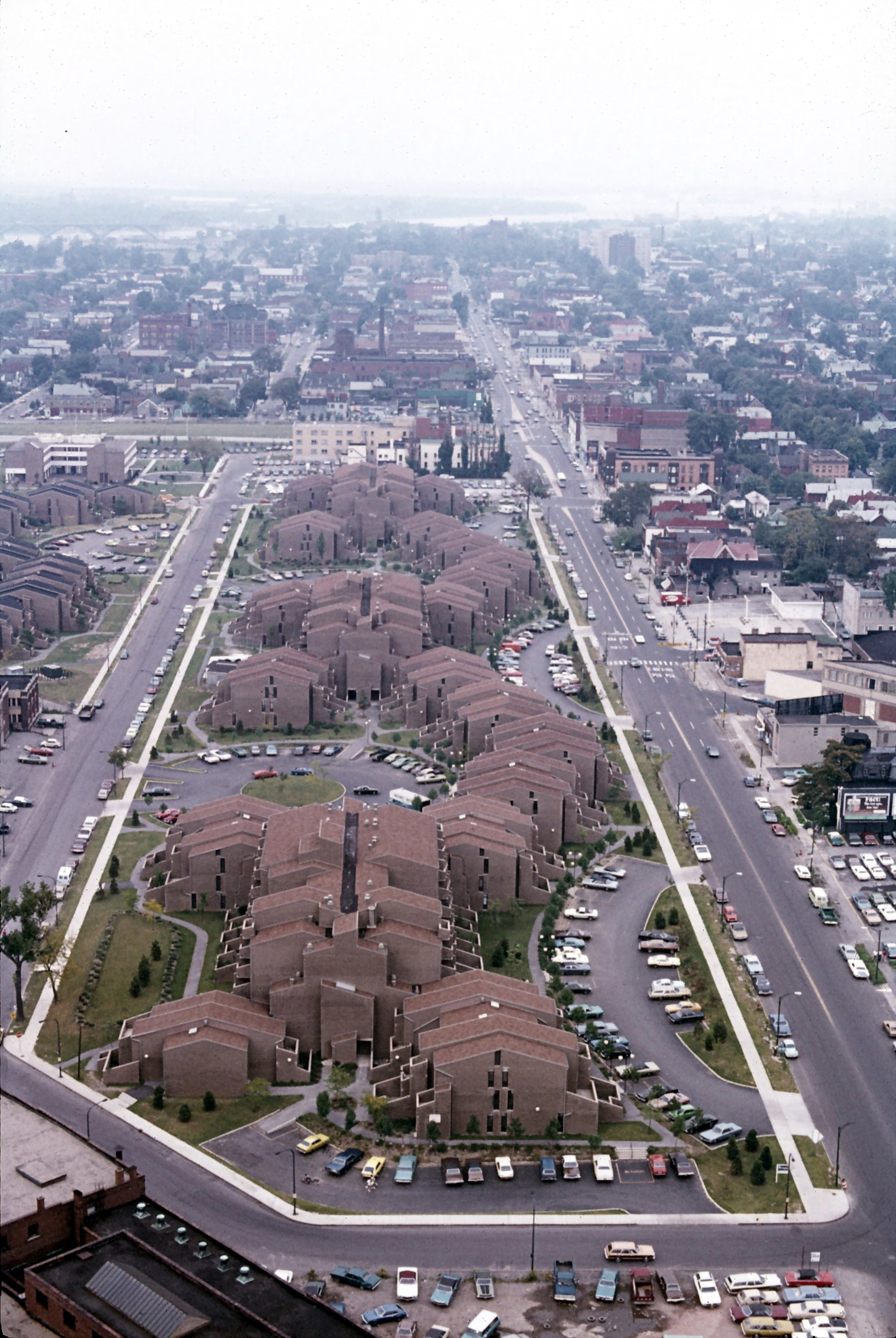
Buffalo Waterfront Housing Project (Shoreline Apartments), Paul Rudolph (1976)

During World War II, many European cities suffered extensive destruction, necessitating comprehensive urban planning initiatives. Governments sometimes implemented modernization strategies based on functionalist principles, often involving the demolition of pre-war neighborhoods and the construction of high-rise housing, expanded road networks, and industrial zones. In the United Kingdom, the Town and Country Planning Act of 1947 facilitated large-scale redevelopment, leading to the creation of new towns and extensive public housing projects. In France, large housing estates known as grands ensembles were built to accommodate a growing urban population. By the 1970s, criticism of urban renewal projects grew, with concerns over social displacement, the loss of historical urban fabric, and the alienating effects of modernist architecture.

Urban renewal in post-WWII America was often used for slum clearance, especially in predominantly dense Black or immigrant neighborhoods which were said to be blighted. The Housing Act of 1949 was used to repurpose the land, which most often replaced the land with more open, planned spaces such as Cabrini-Green in Chicago, Pruitt-Igoe in St. Louis or the Waterfront Housing Project (Shoreline Apartments) in Buffalo.

The impact of these initiatives was significant: cities were often reshaped with new zoning laws, transportation systems, and public housing projects. These changes aimed to accommodate growing populations and improve living conditions, but they also often led to displacement of communities and altered demographics.

=== Twenty-first century ===
In the late twentieth century and now in the twenty-first century, urban renewal initiatives have often pursued three key goals: economic revitalization, social or cultural regeneration, and environmental sustainability. These efforts frequently aim to transform underutilized urban areas into hubs of economic and cultural activity, leveraging policies that promote both sustainability and equitable development. For example, green infrastructure projects, such as urban parks and community gardens, not only enhance property values but also foster social cohesion and provide environmental benefits like improved water management and biodiversity conservation.

In recent years, urban renewal programs have increasingly involved "culturepreneurs," individuals or organizations that blend cultural and economic strategies to reimagine urban spaces. These stakeholders often collaborate with governments and private entities to redevelop vacant land into dynamic public spaces, such as pop-up cultural venues or urban beaches. Culturepreneur initiatives are designed to bridge the gap between the needs of urban residents, local authorities, and property developers, fostering innovative, community-driven solutions.

Moreover, urban renewal projects have drawn attention to the nuanced impacts of gentrification. While these efforts can bring economic and infrastructural improvements, they may also displace long-standing communities and erode cultural heritage. Addressing these challenges requires a deliberate focus on equitable development strategies, as demonstrated by initiatives like the ReGenesis Project in South Carolina, which combines environmental cleanup with community-driven planning.

== Strategies ==
=== Economic impact ===
Urban renewal programs often use economic incentives, including tax abatements, credits and infrastructure investments, to attract businesses and stimulate local development. These incentives aim to leverage private investment and promote economic revitalization in urban centers. Research shows that such incentives can increase property values, create jobs, and boost tax revenues in redeveloped areas. For example, tax increment financing (TIF) districts have been used in many U.S. cities to redirect future tax revenues from improved property values into funding redevelopment projects. To finance infrastructure and capture value uplift generated by public investment, governments have utilized land value capture (LVC) instruments such as betterment levies and land value taxes. Betterment levies, which charge landowners who benefit from specific public improvements, have been used to finance urban regeneration projects in cities including Bogotá and Manizales. Unlike traditional property taxes that tax both land and improvements, land value taxation targets only the unimproved value of a site, removing disincentives to invest in new construction or maintenance. However, modern economic theory indicates that land value taxes are generally neutral with respect to the timing of development, meaning they may not, by themselves, accelerate redevelopment of vacant land. Empirical studies, such as an analysis of Pittsburgh's split-rate tax, have found associations with increased building activity, though researchers caution that other market factors were also significant.

Empirical studies also support the claim that urban renewal, when effectively implemented, contributes to improved income levels and employment opportunities in affected neighborhoods. However, the economic impacts vary and depend largely on the design of the incentives and local economic contexts.

=== Slum clearance ===
Slum clearances are the strategy of demolishing low-income, poor-quality settlements and using the land for another type of housing. As well as being a tool for urban renewal, they have also been carried out for public health and social reform reasons. Slum clearances and other programmes focused mainly on the demolition of housing in disadvantaged areas have often been criticized as a means of urban renewal for not adequately addressing the social problems that caused the initial problems in the area. By contrast, slum upgrading is an approach that aims to improve the existing area by directly addressing existing land tenure, infrastructure, and socioeconomic problems.

=== Eminent domain ===
Also known as land acquisition, compulsory purchase/acquisition, resumption or expropriation in various countries, eminent domain is, in principle, the power to take private property for public use.

However, cases have emerged in the United States in cases where the land acquired was not put to any public use. For example, the Kelo v. City of New London lawsuit ruled that eminent domain may instead transfer acquired private property into private ownership in the case of renewal schemes. The case was brought by a homeowner whose house was acquired and demolished by a private company after the verdict. The company did not complete its contracted construction, leaving the plot empty. Similar occurred in the Rust Belt, where large areas of productive buildings were demolished to enable speculative future development which never materialized. Syracuse, Cincinnati, and Niagara Falls, among many others, cleared entire neighborhoods under urban renewal plans, only for the cleared areas to become surface parking lots, sparse industrial areas, or vacant land.

=== Construction around an event or venue ===
In Barcelona the 1992 Olympics provided a catalyst for infrastructure improvements and the redevelopment of the water front area, and in Bilbao the building of a new art museum was the focus for a new business district around the city's derelict dock area. The approach has become very popular in the UK due to the availability of lottery funding for capital projects and the vibrancy of the cultural and creative sectors. However, the arrival of Tate Modern in the London borough of Southwark may be heralded as a catalyst to economic revival in its surrounding neighborhood.

=== Village renewal ===
The process of urban regeneration is often carried out in rural areas, referred to as village renewal, though it may not be exactly the same in practice. An example being the introduction of tractors in France after the second world war.

== Effects ==
=== Improvement of living conditions ===
Replenished housing stock might be an improvement in quality, cultural and social amenity, and opportunities for safety and surveillance. Developments such as London Docklands increased tax revenues for government. In late 1964, the British commentator Neil Wates expressed the opinion that urban renewal in the United States had 'demonstrated the tremendous advantages which flow from an urban renewal programme,' such as remedying the 'personal problems' of the poor, creation or renovation of housing stock, educational and cultural 'opportunities'.

=== Urban sprawl ===
Urban renewal may increase density and reduce urban sprawl. While urban sprawl is an unrestricted way of expanding the limits of a city, urban renewal clears out undeveloped areas within city limits. While urban sprawl increases urbanization, it can lead to vacant areas and sparse industrial sites.

In some cases, urban renewal may result in increased urban sprawl when city infrastructure begins to include freeways and expressways. Urban renewal triggers urban sprawl to transpire, as a network of highways and interstates becomes the connection between many different cities. Areas are also often cleared in solely order to construct highways, which bring pollution and heavy vehicle traffic to surrounding neighborhoods.

Poorly-conceived designs can lead to the destruction of functional neighborhoods and the creation of new ones which are less desirable or replaced with experimental new development patterns which prove undesirable or not economically sustainable.

=== Displacement of population ===
Community displacement of people living in urban renewal areas comes in various forms. Displacement may be a stated or covert intention of the project, but it may also happen when other renewal objectives are prioritized over the ability of residents to stay in their area, or as an unforeseen consequence of planning decisions. Displacement may be direct, for example in cases where low-income residents are forced to leave their homes and communities, or indirect, for example when renewal is a catalyst for gentrification or housing prices rise such that they no longer affordable to low-income residents. Indirect displacement can also result from the interplay of renewal projects and social inequalities, for example when people face discrimination in the housing market based on racial identity.

In the United States, urban redevelopment projects have often resulted in the displacement of low-income inhabitants and Black communities when their dwellings were taken and demolished. In the 1950s, a Southwest Washington renewal project (see Berman v. Parker) displaced thousands of largely African-American families, but provided them with no replacement housing because at the time the law did not provide for any. A model established to improve the growth and urbanization of American cities instead harmed the welfare of many communities. Increasingly, urban redevelopment led to residents being replaced, not by new residents, but by shopping malls, automobile factories and dealerships, and big-box stores. Replacement housing – particularly in the form of high-rise housing for low-income tenants – has not been successful. Hostile architectural designs, together with low-quality construction and maintenance have often led to rapid deterioration and abandonment of these projects. Public housing projects like Cabrini-Green in Chicago and Pruitt-Igoe in St. Louis became so bad that they had to be demolished. In 2000, Portland, Oregon city leaders promised residents whose communities had already been decimated through urban renewal programs that their latest scheme would benefit the poor, the elderly and ethnic minorities. In 2016, Portland Development Commission apologised again after the funds instead went into multimillion-dollar apartment projects, the increasing prices force the African-American and other low-income residents out of the market.

Several ethnographic studies have explored the impact of urban renewal on marginalized communities. Rebuilding Shattered Worlds: Creating Community by Voicing the Past (2016) examines the destruction of Syrian Town, a multi-ethnic neighborhood in Easton, Pennsylvania largely composed of Lebanese, Italian, and Black residents, as well as how former residents use collective memory to maintain community ties after their displacement.

=== Loss or change of character ===
In the politics of urban renewal, the state ultimately decides what is important to a city based on its own narrative and existing market conditions, and introduces elements which reflect these values, replacing the infrastructure and character of older city cores. This can have knock-on effects on society and culture more broadly. Professor Kenneth Paul Tan writes that Singapore's self-image of having succeeded against all odds has led to strong pressure to pursue progress and development regardless of the destructive cost, postulating that Singapore's "culture of comfort and affluence" has developed in order to cope with people's repeated loss of their sense of place, redirecting their desires from "community" towards "economic progress, upward mobility, affluent and convenient lifestyles and a 'world-class' city."

== Policies and projects by country ==
=== Argentina ===
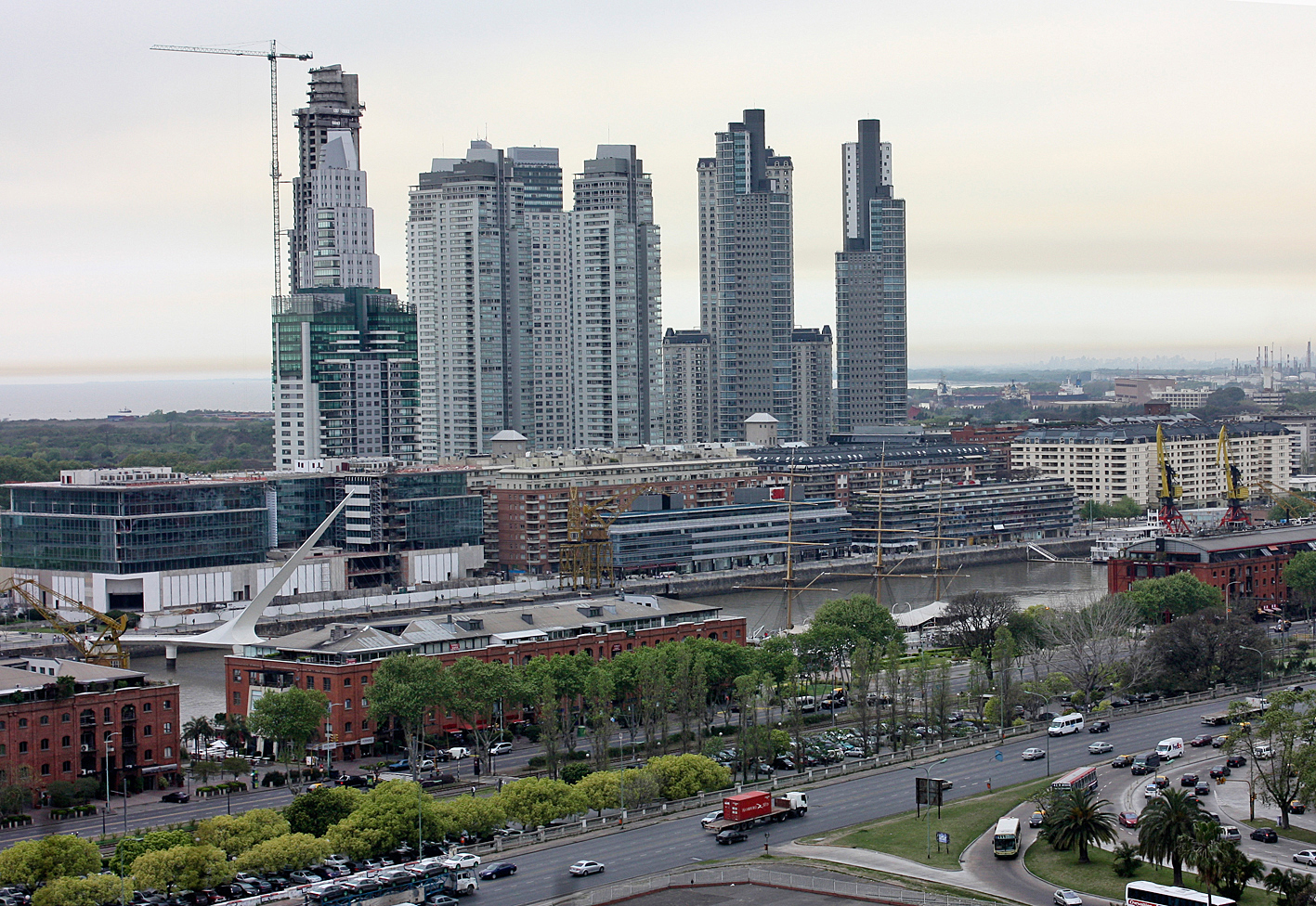
A project named Puerto Madero in Buenos Aires transformed a large disused dock into a new luxury residential and commercial district.

In Buenos Aires, Argentina, Puerto Madero is a known example of an urban renewal project. In the 1990s, the Argentine government decided to build a new residential and commercial district to replace city's old port and docks. More than 50 skyscrapers have been built in the last 20 years. Puerto Madero is now Buenos Aires' most expensive and exclusive neighborhood.

=== Australia ===
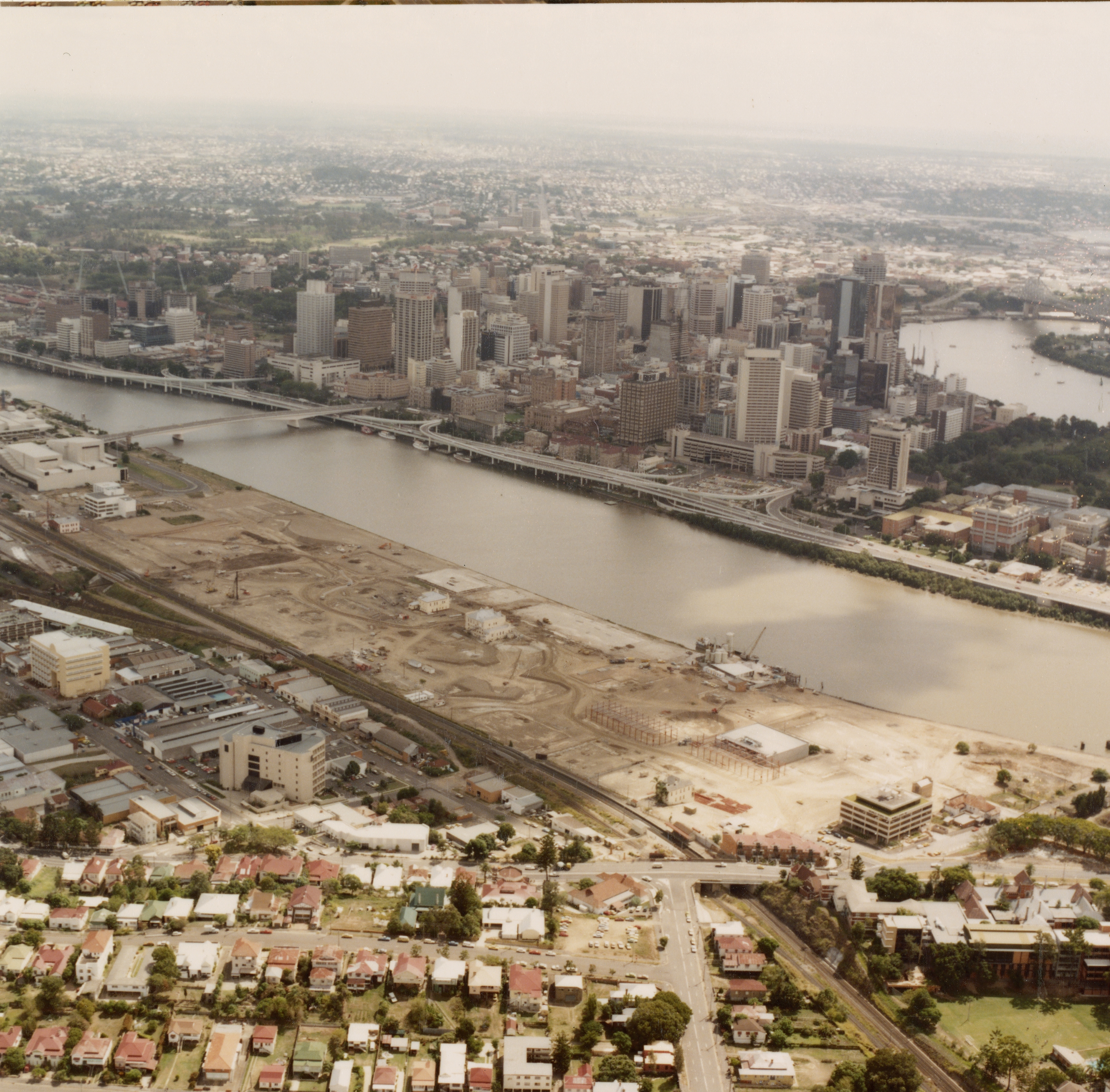
Clearing large areas of South Brisbane in 1987 to make way for World Expo 88

Australia's built environment is quite young and the earliest large scale urban renewal projects didn't occur until the 1960s in the large cities of Sydney and Melbourne. Housing Commission of New South Wales and the Housing Commission of Victoria conducted large slum recalamation projects in the 1960s replacing large areas of Victorian era housing with international style housing commission towers. These projects were halted in the early 1970s as enthusiasm for Towers in the Park planning waned. In 1971, a plan to raze Sydney's historic area The Rocks for public housing was halted by green bans. The CBDs and inner suburban areas of Australia's cities have been in constant renewal since the 19th century, however apart from large commercial re-developments this has mostly been done in ad-hoc fashion rather than as major planning initiative. Among the largest projects since the 1980s have been the clearing of most of South Brisbane's commercial heart to become South Bank for World Expo 88 and the transformation of large industrial parts of South Melbourne to become the modern hi-rise dominated precinct Southbank. More recent ongoing projects include Darling Harbour in Sydney and Docklands in Melbourne in the late 1980s as well as South Wharf in Melbourne and Barangaroo in Sydney in the 2000s. Urban renewal involving established residential areas is now seldom tolerated and more recent projects have instead concentrated on disused industrial and transport infrastructure or adaptive reuse of older building stock particularly for new hi-rise housing projects. Pyrmont and Ultimo in Sydney and Postcode 3000 in Melbourne in 1992 are two key early examples along with Beacon Cove Fisherman's Bend in Melbourne and Urban renewal in Woolstore Precinct, Teneriffe and later Northshore at Hamilton in Brisbane.

=== Brazil ===
In Rio de Janeiro, the Porto Maravilha is a large-scale urban waterfront revitalization project, which covers a centrally located five million square meter area. The project aims to redevelop the port area, increasing the city center attractiveness as a whole and enhancing the city's competitiveness in the global economy. The urban renovation involves 700 km of public networks for water supply, sanitation, drainage, electricity, gas and telecom; 5 km of tunnels; 70 km of roads; 650 km^{2} of sidewalks; 17 km of bike path; 15.000 trees; and 3 plants for sanitation treatment.

=== China ===
China experienced the fastest urbanization and has one of the greatest urban sprawl scale in the world from 1990. Massive real estate development and reconstruction brought economic revitalization. However, when cleaning the urban decay area, traditional and historic buildings were destroyed to different levels. In the industry, researchers and practitioners used "old town reconstruction" and "urban regeneration" to describe the changes made to the urban decay area. After having more research about urban renewal in terms of international trends and domestic development, the practitioners in the industry built consensus to use "urban renewal" to describe all the changes made to the old town area. With the rapid development pace of urbanization in China, the urbanization rate reached the inflection point of the Northam curve. The city development was not about urban sprawl and real estate development on a large scale. China improved its urban development strategy by using inventory planning other than incremental planning. Chinese promoted urbanization aggressively as national policy. But due to the change from the concept of urban renewal in terms of its presentation from the physical dimension, China now promotes small-scale "repairs" to improve the urban environment in a more sustainable and reasonable way. At the 15th China Central City Work Conference, the policy, "urban repair and ecological restoration," was put forward. Immediately thereafter, new urban renewal models such as Guangzhou's micro-renovation and Shanghai's micro-renewal appeared to lead the trend of a new era of urban renewal programs in China.

"Planning is inherently political", however, the urban development in China for the past decade is strikingly similar to the situation in many Western countries. In terms of the similarity sharing with U.S. urban renewal programs, both countries viewed older neighborhoods as outdated and blighted, encouraged local governments to cooperate with local development interests for downtown redevelopment, failed to provide enough support and concern for residents of cleared areas, who often were the low-income residents, and building plenty of highways to reach large scale urban sprawl.

=== Czechia ===
The Josefov neighborhood, or Old Jewish Quarter, in Prague was leveled and rebuilt in an effort at urban renewal between 1890 and 1913.

=== Hong Kong ===
Video: Construction dust spreading from an inhabited building during government-funded renewal in Tai Po, Hong Kong, 2003

The Urban Renewal Authority is the statutory body responsible for urban renewal in Hong Kong. The Operation Building Bright scheme was launched in 2009 and is subsidised by the government. People remain living inside the buildings during the renovation period, which usually lasts for over a year, leading to concerns about exposure to construction dust and the possible presence of asbestos. Such rehabilitation works are common in districts with older buildings, like Kowloon City, Mong Kok, Sham Shui Po, Yao Ma Tei and Tai Po.

The government of Hong Kong has always been concerned with land shortage and has introduced various policies to increase land supply. One of the current initiatives, noted in the Chief Executive's 2022 Policy Address, is to consolidate property interests and expedite urban renewal.

=== India ===
In some cities such as Pune, redevelopment is the only option, as municipal corporations refuse new water connections to save water.

=== Iran ===
Iranian Urban Renewal corporation is in charge of the program. Tehran and Isfahan and Khorasan and Khuzestan have some of the highest statistics of housing developments. Seventh program offers support to Ministry of Road and Urban and Development for gentrification and development in lesser developed zones. Funding will also support money going to mass housing developers.

=== Ireland ===
During the 1990s the concept of culture-led regeneration gained ground. Examples most often cited as successes include Temple Bar in Dublin where tourism was attracted to a bohemian "cultural quarter".

=== Israel ===
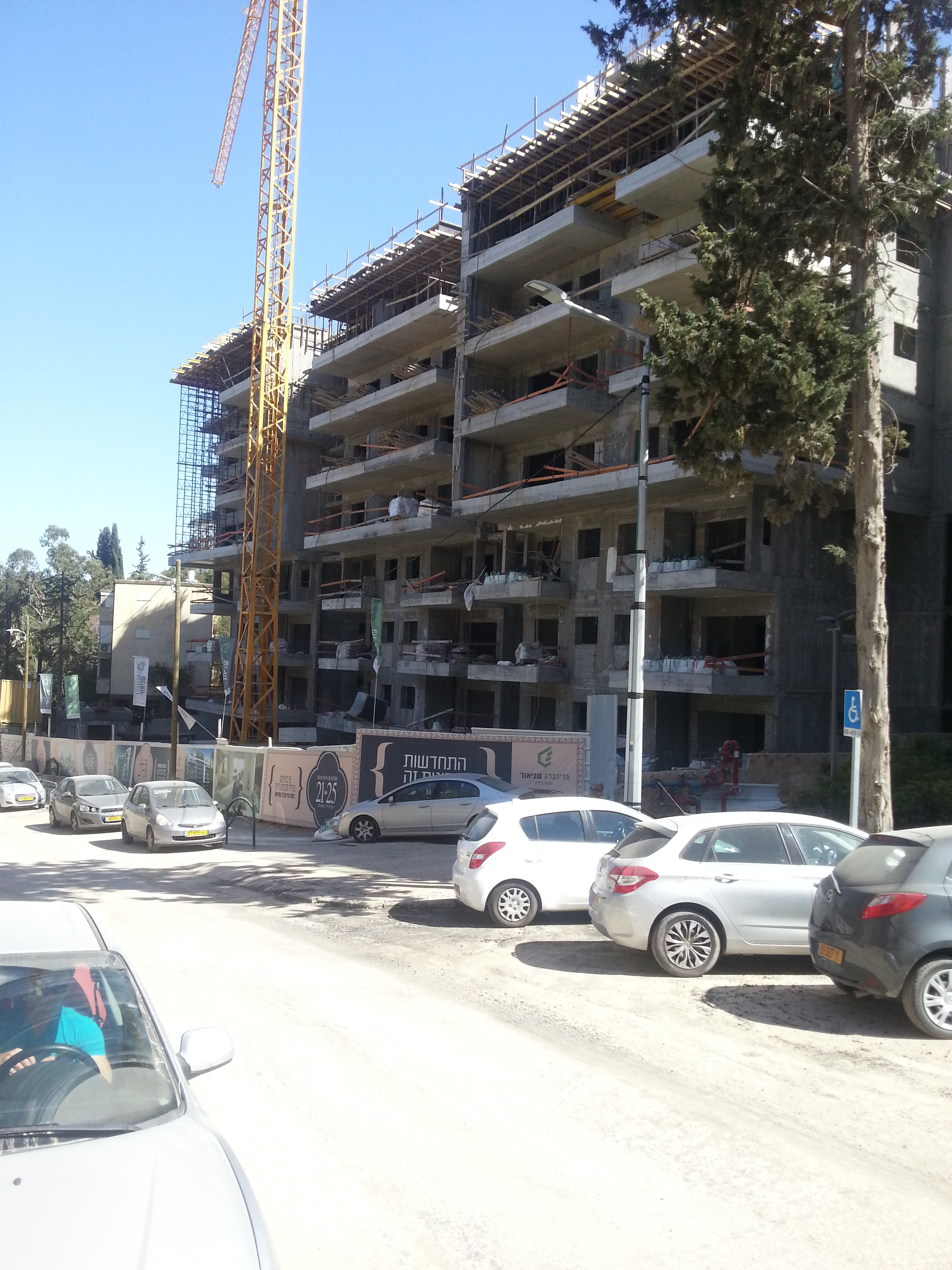
New buildings under construction in Haifa as part of the evacuate and build program

Israel has been undergoing extensive urban renewal projects due to the large number of concrete tenement buildings in its cities which do not meet modern Israeli safety standards and have what is widely considered to be an impoverished and unattractive appearance. Israel built large numbers of these tenement buildings, known in Israel as "train buildings" (בנייני רכבת, binyanei rakevet), in the first decades of independence to house masses of Jewish refugees coming from Europe and the Muslim world. Since then, Israeli architectural styles have changed. In addition, these buildings do not meet modern safety regulations: Israeli law has required all new buildings to be built in an earthquake-resistant manner since 1980 and to be built with bomb shelters since 1991. There are two main urban renewal programs: the evacuate and build program and TAMA 38. The evacuate and build program, launched in 1998, allows developers to tear down older building complexes and replace them with larger and more modern buildings, while TAMA 38, launched in 2005, enables developers to extensively remodel buildings, strengthening them against earthquakes, adding safety rooms, remodeling the building's appearance, and adding new apartments. In both projects, the tenants are temporarily evacuated for the duration of the work and the developer pays for their alternative accommodation. In both programs, the developers add more apartments so as to sell them to additional tenants and make a profit.

=== Italy ===
In Italy, the concept of urban renewal had been having the classical meaning of "recovery", "re-use", and also "redevelopment" for many years. It has not been long time that this meaning has changed, or has begun to change, towards the Anglo-Saxon model taking in account the idea of an action that "determines an increase of economic, cultural, social values in an existing urban or territorial context." For instance, we can mention the regional law of 29 July 2008, nr. 21, of the Puglia Region, "Norms for urban regeneration", which states: «By this law, the Puglia Region promotes the regeneration of parts of cities and urban systems in coherence with municipal and inter-municipal strategies in order to improve urban, socio-economics, environmental and cultural conditions of human settlements "LEGGE REGIONALE 29 luglio 2008, n. 21: "Norme per la rigenerazione urbana".

A similar concept was carried out by Lombardy Region by mean of its Regional Law of 26 November 2019 - n. 18 "Simplification and incentive measures for urban and territorial regeneration, as well as for the recovery of existing building heritage. Changes and addendums to the regional law 11 March 2005, n. 12 (Law for the Government of the Territory) and other regional laws "Legge Regione Lombardia 18/2019. This law defines the urban regeneration as "the coordinated set of urban-building interventions and social initiatives that can include replacement, re-use, redevelopment of the built environment and reorganization of the urban landscape by mean of recovery of degraded, underused or abandoned areas, as well as through the creation and management of infrastructure, green spaces and services [...] with a horizon towards sustainability and environmental and social resilience, technological innovation and increasing biodiversity" (Art 2. L.R.18/2019). The same law introduces some rewards reserved to whom builds for social purposes. Moreover, these rewards are also reserved for those who carry on some particular implementation models. For instance, you can increase the volume of your building whenever "integrated safety systems and construction site risk management processes are applied; methods that are based on traceability and control activities, with particular reference to soil movement and waste traceability, based on advanced technologies", the increase in the building index is recognized in the art. 3 and these rewards are also given when technologies as geolocation, video surveillance and perimeter protection are implemented in order to prevent the "risk of crime during all phases of construction sites" La legalità per la rigenerazione urbana: a law analysis.

=== Morocco ===
In the French colonial period, the entire city of Marrakesh - the city inside the defensive walls - was razed and redeveloped, except for the preservation of mosques, madrassas, and funerary memorials. The preserved madrassas include buildings erected as caravanserai.

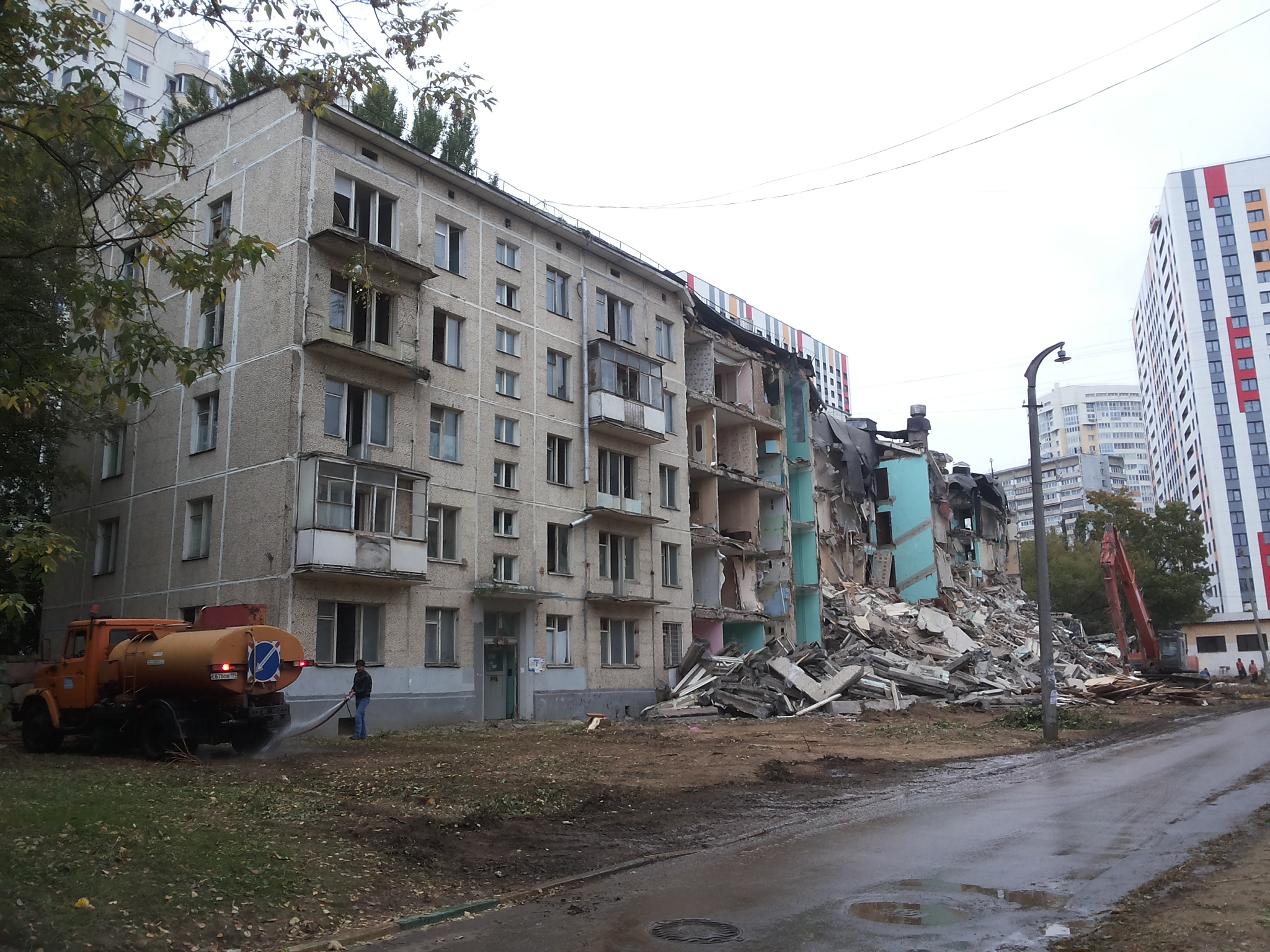
Demolition of a Khrushchevka in Moscow in 2017

=== Russia ===
In 2017, Moscow launched a large-scale program to renovate dilapidated Soviet-built housing, known as Khrushchevki. The program provided for the demolition of 5,171 apartment buildings and the resettlement of 1.6 million city residents by 2032. The program was later extended to a number of other Russian cities.

=== Singapore ===
The history of Singapore's urban renewal goes back to the time period surrounding the Second World War. Before the war, Singapore's housing environment had already been a problem. The tension of both infrastructure and housing conditions were worsened by the rapidly increasing number of the Singapore population in the 1930s. As a consequence of the war and the lack of economic development, between the 1940s to the 1950s, the previous evil of housing conditions continued to happen. As much as 240,000 squatters were placed in Singapore during the 1950s. It was caused by the movement of migrants, especially from peninsular Malaysia and the baby boom. In mid 1959, overcrowded slums were inhabited by a big number of squatter populations, whereas these areas lacked the existence of service facilities such as sanitation.

Since the establishment of the Republic of Singapore, urban renewal has been included in the part of the national improvement policy that was urgently put in action. Before that, the 1958 master plan had already been designed to solve the city problems. However, due to the lack of urban planning experts caused by the deficiency of professional staff, criticism came from many urban practitioners. The professional team recommended by the United Nations then was asked by the government to cope with the urban renewal matters and its redevelopment plan in 1961. Based on the UN assistance report, two pilot developments were initiated in the end of 1964 by the government. These redevelopments then led to the success of Singapore's urban renewal because the government could provide sufficient amount of public housing and business areas.

In the establishment of urban renewal programmes, some difficulties were experienced by the PAP government. The obstacles came from the resistance of people who used to live in the slums and squatters. It was reported by Singapore newspapers that those people were reluctant to be replaced. This became the major problems of 1960s redevelopment schemes. Affordable land value also became one of its reasons. Another problem was that the government had to purchase the private land owned by the middle and upper society to make the land vacant and be used for redevelopment.

=== South Korea ===
Urban regeneration in South Korea began in the 1950s with the reconstruction from Korean War, but the first Urban Redevelopment Act was passed in 1976. This began 20 years of large-scale clearance projects, which did not address socioeconomic problems and led to the breakdown of communities. In the 2000s, the government's focus changed from redevelopment to maintenance of existing developments.

=== Taiwan ===
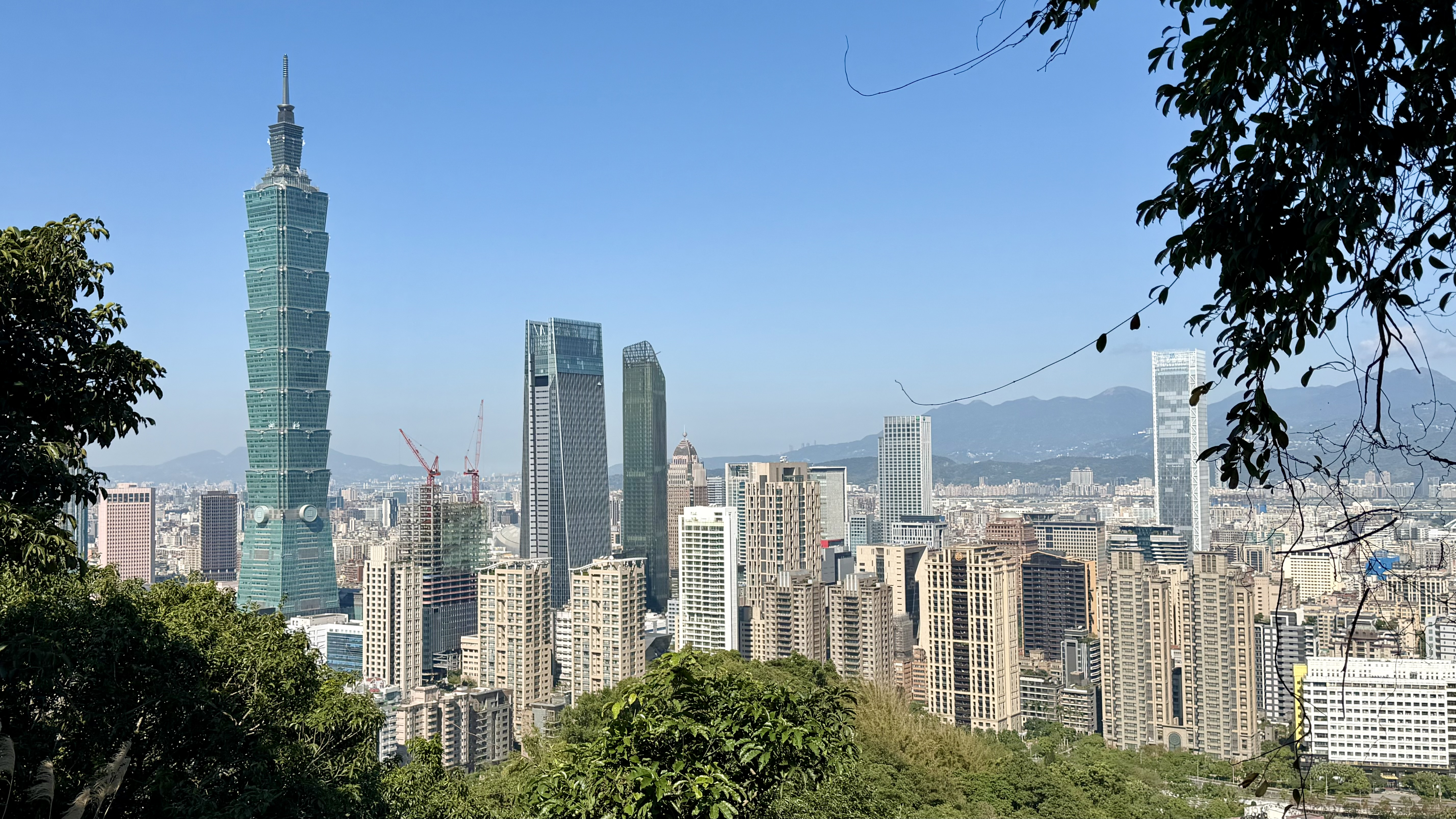
A project named Xinyi Special District in Taipei transformed large disused industrial sites into a new commercial district.

Taiwan's urban planning is governed primarily by the Urban Planning Act, which delineates three types of plans: city/town plans, countryside street plans, and special district plans, distinguishing between new urban developments and renewal of older, dilapidated areas. Local governments periodically update their plans, aligning with national policies on sustainable land use, green space, disaster mitigation, and urban–rural integration.

In Taipei, Taiwan, Xinyi Special District is a known example of an urban renewal project. Its historical development began in 1976, when the Taipei Municipal Government accepted the proposal to redevelop the area east of the Sun Yat-Sen Memorial Hall. The goal of this redevelopment was to set up a secondary commercial center away from the more crowded old city center (Taipei Station, Ximending area). The redevelopment hoped to increase the prosperity of the eastern district and the convenience of urban life for existing residents. The center's purpose was to expand business investment in the area and attract international financial services and technology firms. It also planned for residential development by building a completely new community. The Xinyi Project Area is the only commercial development area in Taipei with a wholly planned street and urban design. In addition to attracting corporations, it also features large retail spaces, department stores, and shopping malls. Xinyi Special District is now the prime central business district of Taipei.

=== United Kingdom ===
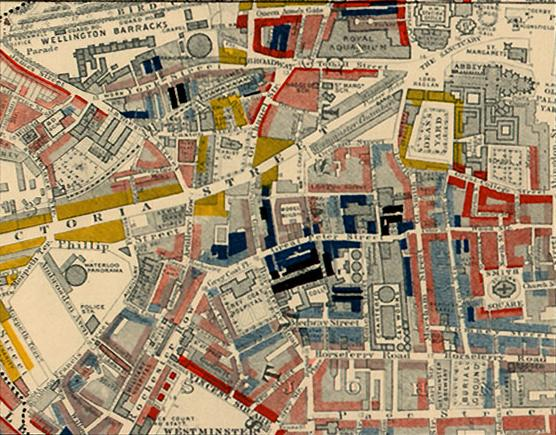
Part of Charles Booth's colour-coded poverty map, showing Westminster in 1889 – a pioneering social study of poverty that shocked the population

==== 19th century ====
From the 1850s onwards, the terrible conditions of the urban poor in the slums of London began to attract the attention of social reformers and philanthropists, who began a movement for social housing. The first area to be targeted was the notorious slum called the Devil's Acre near Westminster. This new movement was largely funded by George Peabody and the Peabody Trust and had a lasting impact on the urban character of Westminster.

Slum clearance began with the Rochester Buildings, on the corner of Old Pye Street and Perkin's Rent, which were built in 1862 by the merchant William Gibbs. They are one of the earliest large-scale philanthropic housing developments in London. The Rochester Buildings were sold to the Peabody Trust in 1877 and later become known as Blocks A to D of the Old Perkin's Rents Estate. Angela Burdett-Coutts, 1st Baroness Burdett-Coutts funded an experimental social housing estate, among the first of its kind, on the corner of Columbia Road and Old Pye Street (now demolished). In 1869, the Peabody Trust built one of its first housing estates at Brewer's Green, between Victoria Street and St. James's Park. What remained of the Devil's Acre on the other side of Victoria Street was cleared and further Peabody estates were built after the Artisans' and Labourers' Dwelling Improvement Act 1875 (38 & 39 Vict. c. 36).

In 1882, the Peabody Trust built the Abbey Orchard Estate on former marshland at the corner of Old Pye Street and Abbey Orchard Street. Like many of the social housing estates, the Abbey Orchard Estate was built following the square plan concept. Blocks of flats were built around a courtyard, creating a semi-private space within the estate functioning as recreation area. The courtyards were meant to create a community atmosphere and the blocks of flats were designed to allow sunlight into the courtyards. The blocks of flats were built using high-quality brickwork and included architectural features such as lettering, glazing, fixtures and fittings. The estates built in the area at the time were considered model dwellings and included shared laundry and sanitary facilities, innovative at the time, and fireplaces in some bedrooms. The design was subsequently repeated in numerous other housing estates in London.

State intervention was first achieved with the passage of the Public Health Act 1875 through Parliament. The act focused on combating filthy urban living conditions that were the cause of disease outbreaks. It required all new residential construction to include running water and an internal drainage system and also prohibited the construction of shoddy housing by building contractors.

"A Cellar dwelling in Nichol Street", illustration for "More Revelations of Bethnal Green", published in The Builder, vol. XXI, no. 1082 (31 October 1863)

The London County Council was created in 1889 as the municipal authority in the County of London and in 1890 the Old Nichol in the East End of London was declared a slum and the Council authorized its clearance and the rebuilding of an area of some 15-acre (6.1 ha), including the Nichol and Snow estates, and a small piece on the Shoreditch side of Boundary Street, formally Cock Lane. The slum clearance began in 1891 and included 730 houses inhabited by 5,719 people. The LCC architects designed 21 and Rowland Plumbe two of 23 blocks containing between 10 and 85 tenements each. A total of 1,069 tenements, mostly two or three-roomed, were planned to accommodate 5,524 persons. The project was hailed as setting "new aesthetic standards for housing the working classes" and included a new laundry, 188 shops, and 77 workshops. Churches and schools were preserved. Building for the project began in 1893 and it was opened by the Prince of Wales in 1900. Other such schemes in the 1880s, where newly cleared sites were sold on to developers, included Whitechapel, Wild Street, Whitecross Street and Clerkenwell.

==== Interwar period ====
The 1917 Tudor Walters Committee Report into the provision of housing and post-war reconstruction in the United Kingdom, was commissioned by Parliament as a response to the shocking lack of fitness amongst many recruits during the War; this was attributed to poor living conditions, a belief summed up in a housing poster of the period "you cannot expect to get an A1 population out of C3 homes".

The report's recommendations, coupled with a chronic housing shortage after the First World War led to a government-led program of house building with the slogan 'Homes for Heroes'. Christopher Addison, the Minister for Housing at the time was responsible for the drafting of the Housing, Town Planning, &c. Act 1919 which introduced the new concept of the state being involved in the building of new houses. This marked the start of a long 20th century tradition of state-owned housing, which would much later evolve into council estates.

With the onset of the Great Depression in 1929, increased house building and government expenditure was used to pull the country out of recession. The Housing Act 1930 gave local councils wide-ranging powers to demolish properties unfit for human habitation or that posed a danger to health, and obligated them to rehouse those people who were relocated due to the large scale slum clearance programs. Cities with a large proportion of Victorian terraced housing – housing that was no longer deemed of sufficient standard for modern living requirements – underwent the greatest changes. Over 5,000 homes (25,000 residents) in the city of Bristol were designated as redevelopment areas in 1933 and slated for demolition. Although efforts were made to house the victims of the demolitions in the same area as before, in practice this was too difficult to fully implement and many people were rehoused in other areas, even different cities. In an effort to rehouse the poorest people affected by redevelopment, the rent for housing was set at an artificially low level, although this policy also only achieved mixed success.

Post-Second World War

Post-war reconstruction was a catalyst for much urban renewal in the UK.

==== Since the 1990s ====
The Single Regeneration Budget (SRB) was a project run by the government from 1994 to 2002 to enable regeneration in areas with social and economic problems, with funds allocated through a competitive bidding system. The Housing Market Renewal Initiative (also known as the Pathfinder Scheme) was in place between 2002 and 2011 and aimed to demolish, refurbish or construct new housing. Areas of housing that were demolished were replaced with new houses aimed towards attracting richer tenants to move to the area, rather than use by the areas' former residents. Other programs, such as The Castleford Project (2002-2005) sought to enable local citizens to have greater control and ownership of the direction of their community and the way in which it overcomes market failure. This approach supports important themes in urban renewal today, such as participation, sustainability and trust – and government acting as advocate and 'enabler', rather than an instrument of command and control.

Currently there are two main Urban Regeneration projects going on in London, Elephant Park at Elephant & Castle and at Stratford. These are both being done by Lendlease, a multinational company focusing on redeveloping neglected city areas.

=== United States ===
In the United States the term 'urban renewal' technically refers only to a federal program in the middle-to-late 20th Century, but colloquially is sometimes used to refer to any large-scale change in urban development. Urban renewal is a widely discussed and controversial program. Urban renewal sometimes lives up to the hopes of its original proponents – it has been assessed by politicians, urban planners, civic leaders, and residents – it has played an important but controversial role. But at other times urban redevelopment projects have failed in several American cities, having wasted large amounts of public funds to no purpose. It has been seen by proponents as an economic engine and a reform mechanism, and by critics as a mechanism for control.

==== 1900 to 1950s ====
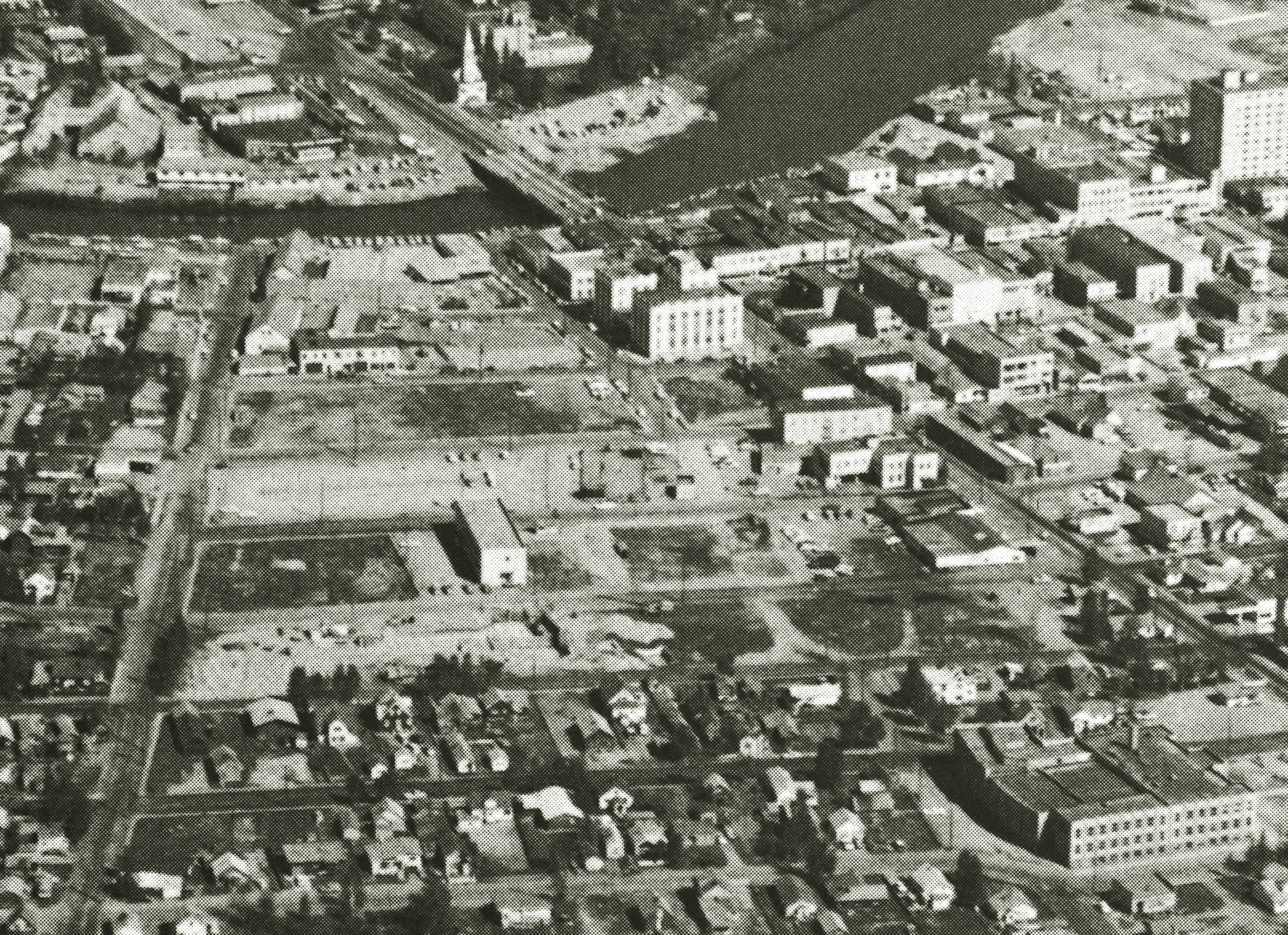
Aerial view of downtown Fairbanks, Alaska in the early 1960s, showing the area cleared in Alaska's first urban renewal project

Prior to the Urban Renewal policies of the 1950s, cities in the United States revitalized with large scale projects like the design and construction of Central Park in New York and the 1909 Plan for Chicago by Daniel Burnham. Similarly, the efforts of Jacob Riis in advocating for improved living conditions in degraded areas of New York in the late 19th century were also formative. The redevelopment of large sections of New York City and New York State by Robert Moses between the 1930s and the 1970s was a notable and prominent example of urban redevelopment. Moses directed the construction of new bridges, highways, housing projects, and public parks.

Other cities across the US began to create redevelopment programs in the late 1930s and 1940s. These early projects were generally focused on slum clearance and were implemented by local public housing authorities, which were responsible both for clearing slums and for building new affordable housing. In Detroit, the (local) City Planning and Housing Council (CHPC) founded in 1937 had a large hand in the reconstruction of urban slums, with their primary mission being the elimination of poor housing conditions, creating less crowded and cleaner public housing.

In 1944, the G.I. Bill (officially the Serviceman's Readjustment Act) guaranteed Veterans Administration (VA) mortgages to veterans under favorable terms, which fueled suburbanization after the end of World War II, as places like Levittown, New York; Warren, Michigan; and the San Fernando Valley of Los Angeles were transformed from farmland into cities occupied by tens of thousands of families in a few years. However, the GI Bill was primarily beneficial for white veterans over black ones, so in inner cities where black veterans tried using the benefits from the GI bill to occur housing or jobs, it was much more difficult.

The Housing Act of 1949, also known as the Taft-Ellender-Wagner Act, provided federal loans to cities to acquire and clear slum areas to be sold to private developers to redevelop in accordance with a plan prepared by the city (normally with new housing), and grants to cover two-thirds of the portion of the city's costs in excess of the sale prices received from the developers, as well as provide millions of dollars to create public housing throughout the country. The phrase used at the time was "urban redevelopment". "Urban renewal" was a phrase popularized with the passage of the Housing Act of 1954, which made these projects more enticing to developers by, among other things, providing mortgages backed by the Federal Housing Administration (FHA).

The term "urban renewal" was not introduced in the USA until the Housing Act was again amended in 1954. That was also the year in which the U.S. Supreme Court upheld the general validity of urban redevelopment statutes in the landmark case, Berman v. Parker.

Pittsburgh was infamous around the world as one of the dirtiest and most economically depressed cities. Under the influence of multimillionaire R.K. Mellon, Pittsburgh became the first major city to undertake a modern urban-renewal program in May 1950. A large section of downtown at the heart of the city was demolished, converted to parks, office buildings, and a sports arena and renamed the Golden Triangle in what was generally recognized as a major success. Other neighborhoods were also subjected to urban renewal, but with mixed results. Some areas did improve, while other areas, such as East Liberty and the Hill District, declined following ambitious projects that shifted traffic patterns, blocked streets to vehicular traffic, isolated or divided neighborhoods with highways, and removed large numbers of ethnic and minority residents. An entire neighborhood was destroyed (to be replaced by the Civic Arena), displacing 8000 residents (most of whom were poor and black).

Because of the ways in which it targeted the most disadvantaged sector of the American population, novelist James Baldwin famously dubbed Urban Renewal "Negro Removal" in the 1960s.

Early to mid-20th century Detroit was a prime area for urban "redevelopers", as much of the city had only decrepit housing available. The efforts of the CHPC and the FHA to renew Detroit caused huge amounts of black displacement due to the construction of highways and airports directly through black neighborhoods like 8-mile and Paradise Valley. Black families were thrown out from their homes and not provided relocation services. The "slums" being cleared or being looked at for redevelopment were primarily black neighborhoods.

In 1956, the Federal-Aid Highway Act gave state and federal government complete control over new highways, and often they were routed directly through vibrant urban neighborhoods—isolating or destroying many—since the focus of the program was to bring traffic in and out of the central cores of cities as expeditiously as possible and nine out of every ten dollars spent came from the federal government. This resulted in a serious degradation of the tax bases of many cities, isolated entire neighborhoods, and meant that existing commercial districts were bypassed by the majority of commuters. Segregation continued to increase as communities were displaced. Black families that had their homes and neighborhoods destroyed had to find housing options deeper in the inner city as whites could then use those highways to spread further and further into the suburbs but continue to work in the city.

In Boston, one of the country's oldest cities, almost a third of the old city was demolished—including the historic West End—to make way for a new highway, low- and moderate-income high-rises (which eventually became luxury housing), and new government and commercial buildings. This came to be seen as a tragedy by many residents and urban planners, and one of the centerpieces of the redevelopment—Government Center—is still considered an example of the excesses of urban renewal.

==== Reaction against urban renewal ====
In 1961, Jane Jacobs published The Death and Life of Great American Cities, one of the first—and strongest—critiques of contemporary large-scale urban renewal. However, it would still be a few years before organized movements began to oppose urban renewal. The Rondout neighborhood in Kingston, New York (on the Hudson River) was essentially destroyed by a federally funded urban renewal program in the 1960s, with more than 400 old buildings demolished, most of them historic brick structures built in the 19th century. Similarly ill-conceived urban renewal programs gutted the historic centers of other towns and cities across America in the 1950s and 1960s (for example the West End neighborhood in Boston, the Gateway District of Minneapolis, the downtown area of Norfolk, Virginia and the historic waterfront areas of the towns of Narragansett and Newport in Rhode Island).

The Civil Rights Act of 1964 is a landmark law to prohibit discrimination based on race, gender, religion, sex, national origin, and later sexual orientation and gender identity through legal means. At this time, racial deed restrictions on housing were legally removed and banned, which was an important step for Desegregation in the United States. However, redlining still existed to present the unequal real estate transaction for many ethnic minorities. Even though segregation was explicitly illegal, discrimination under urban planning context has been deep-rooted.

From 1965 to 1967, riots swept many cities across the States—most drastically in Detroit during the 12th Street Riot. By the 1970s many major cities developed opposition to the sweeping urban-renewal plans for their cities. In Boston, community activists halted construction of the proposed Southwest Expressway but only after a three-mile long stretch of land had been cleared. In San Francisco, Joseph Alioto was the first mayor to publicly repudiate the policy of urban renewal, and with the backing of community groups, forced the state to end construction of highways through the heart of the city. Atlanta lost over 60,000 people between 1960 and 1970 because of urban renewal and expressway construction, but a downtown building boom turned the city into the showcase of the New South in the 1970s and 1980s. In the early 1970s in Toronto, Jacobs was heavily involved in a group which halted the construction of the Spadina Expressway and altered transport policy in that city.

Some of the policies around urban renewal began to change under President Lyndon Johnson and the War on Poverty, and in 1968, the Housing and Urban Development Act and The New Communities Act of 1968 guaranteed private financing for private entrepreneurs to plan and develop new communities. Subsequently, the Housing and Community Development Act of 1974 established the Community Development Block Grant program (CDBG) which began in earnest the focus on redevelopment of existing neighborhoods and properties, rather than demolition of substandard housing and economically depressed areas.

Until 1970, the displaced owners and tenants received only the constitutionally-mandated "just compensation" specified in the Fifth Amendment to the U.S. Constitution. This measure of compensation covered only the fair market value of the taken property, and omitted compensation for a variety of incidental losses like, for example, moving expenses, loss of favorable financing and notably, business losses, such as loss of business goodwill. In the 1970s the federal government and state governments enacted the Uniform Relocation Assistance Act which provides for limited compensation of some of these losses. However the Act denies the displaced land owners the right to sue to enforce its provisions, so it is deemed an act of legislative grace rather than a constitutional right. Historically, urban redevelopment has been controversial because of such practices as taking private property by eminent domain for "public use" and then turning it over to redevelopers free of charge or for less than the acquisition cost (known as "land write-down"). Thus, in the controversial Connecticut case of Kelo v. City of New London (2005) the plan called for a redeveloper to lease the subject 90-acre waterfront property for $1 per year.

Currently, a mix of renovation, selective demolition, commercial development, and tax incentives is most often used to revitalize urban neighborhoods. An example of an entire eradication of a community is Africville in Halifax, Nova Scotia. Gentrification is still controversial, and often results in familiar patterns of poorer residents being priced out of urban areas into suburbs or more depressed areas of cities. Some programs, such as that administered by Fresh Ministries and Operation New Hope in Jacksonville, Florida, and the Hill Community Development Corporation (Hill CDC) in Pittsburgh's historic Hill District attempt to develop communities, while at the same time combining highly favorable loan programs with financial literacy education so that poorer residents are not displaced.

==== Niagara Falls, New York ====
An example of urban renewal gone wrong in the United States is in downtown Niagara Falls, New York. Most of the original downtown was demolished in the 1960s, and many replacement projects including the Rainbow Centre Factory Outlet, Niagara Falls Convention and Civic Center, the Native American Cultural Center, the Hooker Chemical (later the Occidental Petroleum) Headquarters building, the Wintergarden, the Fallsville Splash Park, a large parking ramp, an enclosed pedestrian walkway, the Falls Street Faire & Falls Street Station entertainment complexes, and the Mayor E. Dent Lackey Plaza closed within twenty to thirty years of their construction. In addition, the Robert Moses State Parkway cut through the town, dividing it from the riverfront. As in many American cities, some demolished blocks were never replaced.

Ultimately, the former tourist district of the city along Falls Street was destroyed. It went against the principles of several urban philosophers, such as Jane Jacobs, who claimed that mixed-use districts were needed (which the new downtown was not) and arteries needed to be kept open. Smaller buildings also should be built or kept. In Niagara Falls, however, the convention center blocked traffic into the city, located in the center of Falls Street (the main artery), and the Wintergarden also blocked traffic from the convention center to the Niagara Falls. The Rainbow Centre interrupted the street grid, taking up three blocks, and parking ramps isolated the city from the core, leading to the degradation of nearby neighborhoods. Tourists were forced to walk around the Rainbow Center, the Wintergarden, and the Quality Inn (all of which were adjacent), in total five blocks, discouraging small business in the city. These issues have spawned ongoing efforts to address them.

=== South Africa ===
From 1938 to 1942, the Central Housing Board and Cape Town City Council constructed 13,000 flats as part of slum clearance projects. In the mid-1950s, some residential areas of Johannesburg were to be involuntarily removed by city planners. Black townships were targeted, motivated by residents' participation in civil unrest against the Apartheid government authorities in 1949 and 1950. In post-apartheid South Africa major grassroots social movements such as the Western Cape Anti-Eviction Campaign and Abahlali baseMjondolo emerged to contest 'urban renewal' programs that forcibly relocated the poor out of the cities.

== See also ==
Planning:

- Phase I environmental site assessment – Contamination assessment for US real estate, known as 'ESA'
- Big City Plan – Major development plan for the city centre of Birmingham, England
- List of urban planners

Types of project:

- Megaproject – Extremely large-scale construction and investment project
- Overspill estate – Housing for relocated inner-city residents
- List of planned cities
- Temporary use – Time-limited use of empty urban buildings

Social processes:

- Environmental racism – Environmental injustice that occurs within a racialized context
- Community development – Communities taking collective action to solve common problems

Academic theory:

- New Urbanism – Urban design movement promoting sustainable land use
- Principles of Intelligent Urbanism – Theory of urban planning
- Urban economics – Economic study of urban areas
- Urban renaissance – Repopularisation of city living in England
- Urban vitality – Intensity of use of an urban area
