= Memory Wars: Settlers and Natives Remember Washington's Sullivan Expedition of 1779 =

2023 book by Andrea L. Smith

Memory Wars: Settlers and Natives Remember Washington’s Sullivan Expedition of 1779
- Cover
- Author: Andrea Lynn Smith
- Language: English
- Subject: History, memory studies, settler-colonialism
- Genre: Non-fiction
- Publisher: University of Nebraska Press
- Publication date: July 2023
- Publication place: United States
- Media type: Print (Hardcover)
- Pages: 454
- Award: 2024 Choice Outstanding Academic Title
- ISBN: 978-1-496-20696-1
- Preceded by: Rebuilding Shattered Worlds: Creating Community by Voicing the Past

Memory Wars: Settlers and Natives Remember Washington's Sullivan Expedition of 1779 is a book by Andrea Lynn Smith, published by the University of Nebraska Press in 2023. The book examines the legacy and memory of the Sullivan Expedition, a military campaign ordered by General George Washington during the American Revolutionary War (1775–1783), aimed at neutralizing the Iroquois Confederacy, which was allied with the British. This expedition was part of Washington's Indian Expedition, which included the two-pronged expedition led by Major General John Sullivan and General James Clinton, preliminary attacks on Onondaga villages in April 1779 led by Colonel Van Schaick, and attacks on Delaware, Seneca and other settlements led by Colonel Daniel Brodhead. Collectively, these expeditions caused the destruction of over 50 Haudenosaunee, Delaware, and mixed Indigenous settlements across Pennsylvania and New York, causing mass exodus, leaving a lasting impact on the region's Indigenous populations.

== Summary ==
The book is a historical analysis that investigates the commemorative practices and public memory these expeditions.

Smith's work is divided into three parts, each exploring different aspects of the memory and legacy of the Sullivan Expedition. The first section, "Origins: Settler-Colonial Public Memory," investigates how local patriotic societies, such as the Daughters of the American Revolution, and state organizations in Pennsylvania and New York have shaped the narrative of the Sullivan Expedition through monuments, celebrations, and public commemorations. It is divided into two parts, one dedicated to Pennsylvania commemorations and the second to New York activities. One chapter focuses on the Battle of Wyoming, a central focus in Pennsylvania memory of the Revolutionary War. Smith argues that people developing early monuments to the Sullivan Expedition in northeastern Pennsylvania understood it largely in relation to the Wyoming battle that preceded it.

The New York section commences with a chapter dedicated to the Newtown Centennial of 1879. Three chapters discuss the state Education Department's 1929 commemorations. Led by State Historian Alexander C. Flick, the New York State Education Department established 35 stone monoliths with bronze plaques across the state with large public events in 1929. One chapter focuses on an associated 1929 pageant promoted by New York reenacting the expedition, performed three times at three locations with audiences of upwards of 50,000 people.

The second section, "Reverberations: The Revolutionary Past in Contemporary America," examines the lasting impact of these commemorative practices in modern times. Smith analyzes how contemporary celebrations, such as reenactments and public ceremonies, continue to reflect and reinforce settler-colonial narratives while also sparking debates about the historical significance of the Sullivan Expedition.

In the final section, "Interventions: Indigenous Histories of Settler Colonialism," Smith shifts the focus to the perspectives of the Haudenosaunee (Iroquois) people, exploring how Indigenous communities remember the Sullivan Expedition as part of a broader history of colonial struggle and resistance. This section underscores the contrast between Indigenous memories of the invasion and the settler-colonial narratives that dominate public commemorations.

== Reviews ==
In his review of the book, Chad Anderson praised its thorough examination of how public memory has been shaped around the Sullivan Expedition through monuments and commemorations. Anderson noted that Smith effectively highlighted the way local histories, particularly those of the Battle of Wyoming and the Battle of Newtown, have been instrumental in crafting a narrative of settler triumph and Native defeat. He remarked that Smith's work is a "thoughtful, often engaging contribution to this ongoing conversation" about how historical memory is constructed and contested. Anderson also observed that the book occasionally struggled to convincingly connect the dots between these commemorations and their impact on public memory.

Joe Stahlman reviewed the work and commended it for its timely and relevant exploration of how commemorative practices shape historical understanding. Stahlman appreciated Smith's ability to juxtapose settler and Indigenous perspectives, revealing how the Sullivan–Clinton Campaign's legacy is remembered differently across communities. He highlighted Smith's examination of "how not every element of one's culture is universally viewed in the same manner," which challenges dominant American narratives. Stahlman concluded that Smith's work encourages critical reflection on the upcoming 250th anniversary of America's founding.

American historian Lisa Blee emphasized the author's careful reconstruction of how public memory formed around a contested historical campaign. Blee praised the archival and ethnographic research for illuminating settler perspectives. She described the book as "a well-written and uniquely organized interdisciplinary monograph that productively engages recent colonial studies and memory studies."

== Awards ==
- 2024 Choice Outstanding Academic Title
