= Seneca Niagara Casino & Hotel =

Casino in Niagara Falls, New York

Coordinates: 43.086145°N 79.056940°W

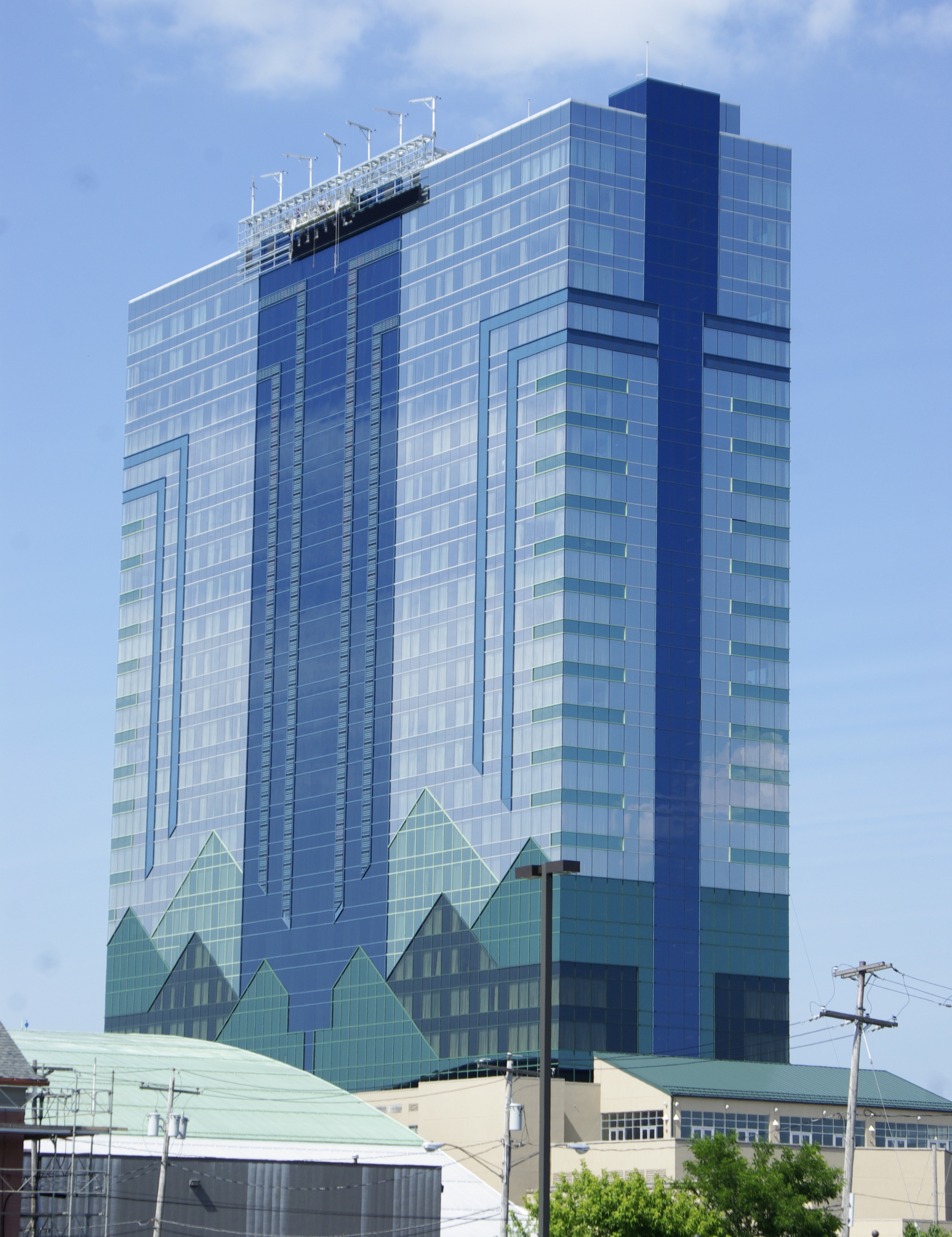
- View of front entrance
- Interactive map of Seneca Niagara Casino & Hotel
- Location: Niagara Falls, New York, United States; 310 Fourth Street Niagara Falls, New York 14303
- Opened: Casino: December 31, 2002 Hotel: December 30, 2005
- Theme: Bears/Woods/Water (Niagara areas natural state)
- No. of rooms: 594
- Gaming space: 147,000 sq ft (13,700 m^{2})
- Signature attractions: Spa, Casino, Hotel, and Restaurants
- Notable restaurants: Java Café; Morrie's Express; Thunder Falls Buffet; Three Sisters Café; Koi; La Cascata; The Western Door: A Seneca Steakhouse; Blues
- Casino type: Land-based
- Owner: Seneca Nation Of Indians
- Renovated in: Thunder Falls Buffet (2007, 2012)
- Website: www.senecaniagaracasino.com

Seneca Niagara Casino & Hotel is a casino in Niagara Falls, New York, United States. It was built by the Seneca Nation to compete with Casino Niagara and Niagara Fallsview Casino Resort in Niagara Falls, Ontario, Canada. Formerly known as the Niagara Falls Convention and Civic Center, it was sold to the federally recognized Seneca Nation of Indians.

The casino floor has an area of 147,000 sq ft (13,700 m^{2}) with 99 gaming tables and 4,200 slot machines. It is the largest hotel in New York state outside of Manhattan.

== History ==
The Seneca Niagara Casino opened on December 31, 2002, the result of an $80 million transformation of the Niagara Falls Convention and Civic Center into a full-service casino. It features 82,000 square feet of gaming space with 2,595 slot machines and 91 table games. In May 2004, construction began on the casino's 26-story hotel tower. The $240 million hotel tower opened in December 2005. Upon its opening, The New York Times described the tower as "the skyline on the American side of the Niagara River."

In late 2012, the casino opened a brand new buffet space called Thunder Falls Buffet. This space was later closed and reopened in 2022 as the Full Plate Eatery.

In 2013, the casino received $26 million worth of renovations and upgrades to the main casino gaming floor and the outside square. An additional $6 million was spent on improvements to the casino's HVAC system.

The Seneca Nation of Indians and Seneca Gaming Corporation announced a $40 million renovation and beautification plan for the casino in 2018. The plan included a new lobby and lobby bar. Additional registration and VIP check-in areas as well as a new entryway off were also announced.

The casino closed on March 16, 2020 during the COVID-19 pandemic and resumed 24 hour operations in July 2020 as part of its reopening plan during the COVID-19 pandemic.

== Restaurants ==
- Western Door (Steakhouse)
- Koi (Asian Cuisine)
- La Cascata (Italian Cuisine)
- Full Plate Eatery (Buffet)
- Blues Burger Bar
- Three Sisters Café
- Bear Claw Cafe
- Slice-N-Dice (Pizza)
- Lounge 101

== Shopping ==
- 8 Clans (Native American merchandise)
- The Garden Nook
- Lux Box
- Odds & Ends

== Entertainment ==
The Seneca Niagara Casino & Hotel is home to the Seneca Niagara Events Center, a 2,400-seat theater that has hosted various performing artists, including Stevie Nicks, Tony Bennett, Aretha Franklin, Martina McBride, Trace Adkins, Lewis Black, Lisa Lampanelli, Steely Dan, Heart, Steve Miller Band, Huey Lewis and the News, Gretchen Wilson, Air Supply, Smokey Robinson, Diana Ross, Blondie, Jeff Foxworthy, Jay Leno, The Moody Blues, Grand Funk Railroad, Cheap Trick, Jim Gaffigan, New Kids on the Block, Seth Meyers, The Pointer Sisters, Chicago, The Go-Go's, Bobby Vinton, Tracy Morgan, Jackson Browne, Frank Caliendo, Michael Bolton, Alanis Morissette and more.

In addition, the Seneca Niagara Casino & Hotel has the Bear's Den Showroom, a 440-seat theatre that presents more intimate shows, such as The Goo Goo Dolls, Eddie Money, The Grass Roots, Lou Gramm, Gary Lewis and the Playboys, Little River Band, Mary Wilson, Richard Marx, and more.

After a year of being closed during pandemic, Seneca Resort in Niagara Falls start hosting online events like broadcasting concerts, sports events and interactive tournaments.

== Expansion ==
In February 2008, the Seneca Gaming Corp. announced the expansion of the Seneca Niagara Casino & Hotel Property. It added more hotel rooms, and other amenities. It had acquired Fallsville Splash Park, located next to the Seneca Niagara Casino, which was condemned by the State of New York and transferred to the Seneca Gaming Corporation. It was demolished for Phase 2 of expansion of the Niagara Falls casino.

== Legal issues ==
=== Adjacent properties owned by Seneca Gaming Corp. ===
Adjacent properties owned by the Seneca Gaming Corporation were not located on Seneca territory owned by the Nation, therefore, it is technically illegal to put slot machines or provide for gambling. The Splash Park Property where Phase 2 of expansion, which is about to take place, is also located on non-sovereign land.

The former Convention Center is located on sovereign land, and the casino is operated by Gaming Corporation.

== Accolades ==
In 2023, the resort was ranked sixth on a list of the Ten Best Casinos Outside Las Vegas by USA Today in their 10 Best Readers Choice Awards.

== See also ==
- Seneca Allegany Casino
- Seneca Buffalo Creek Casino
- List of integrated resorts
