= Rebuilding Shattered Worlds: Creating Community by Voicing the Past =

2016 book by Andrea L. Smith and Anna Eisenstein

- Cover
- Author: Andrea L. Smith and Anna Eisenstein
- Language: English
- Series: Anthropology of Contemporary North America
- Subject: Anthropology
- Genre: Non-fiction
- Publisher: University of Nebraska Press
- Publication date: October 2016
- Publication place: United States
- Media type: Paperback
- Pages: 190
- ISBN: 978-0-8032-9058-7
- Followed by: Memory Wars: Settlers and Natives Remember Washington's Sullivan Expedition of 1779

Rebuilding Shattered Worlds: Creating Community by Voicing the Past is a 2016 book by Andrea L. Smith and Anna Eisenstein, published by the University of Nebraska Press and is part of its Anthropology of Contemporary North America Series.

== Summary ==
The book examines the lasting impact of the destruction of Syrian Town, a diverse neighborhood in Easton, Pennsylvania, due to urban renewal projects. The book is based on six years of ethnographic research and focuses on how elderly former residents use language and memory to connect with their lost community. It delves into themes of blight, race, and the significance of place, emphasizing the interplay of linguistic and material remnants in the process of remembering. The authors employ methods from linguistic anthropology and material studies to explore how expressions of "pastness" help maintain a sense of identity and continuity. The book highlights the role of collective memory in sustaining community ties despite physical dislocation.

== Critical reception ==
In his review, Michael Silverstein presented a critical and analytical perspective on the ethnographic project undertaken in the book. Silverstein acknowledged the authors' innovative approach to memory ethnography, which departs from traditional studies of public monuments and ritual commemorations to focus on the aggregated historical consciousness of individuals affected by urban renewal in Easton, Pennsylvania. He appreciated the methodological rigor and the narrative depth that bring the dispersed memories of Easton's "Syrian Town" into a collective biography, capturing the socio-economic and cultural fabric of the neighborhood before its destruction. Silverstein highlighted the book's exploration of narrative diversity and temporal heteroglossia, and appreciated how memorabilia and personal testimonies recover the subjective experiences of former residents. Silverstein recognized the book's contribution to understanding the impacts of urban renewal on marginalized communities and its potential to influence political consciousness through ethnographic storytelling.

Michael Strong acknowledged the thoroughness of the ethnographic research methods employed, which included extensive fieldwork and innovative engagement through a community anthropology course. He critiqued the book for its inadequate geographical description of Syrian Town, despite the importance placed on place knowledge for effective communication. Strong pointed out missed opportunities for deeper geographic insights, which could have enhanced the text's impact on readers, particularly geographers. He also noted that while the book provides valuable perspectives on place and language, it falls short in clearly connecting nostalgia and memory to political action in the context of urban renewal, leaving potential public policy implications under-explored.

Anthropologist Alex Ruuska from Northern Michigan University emphasized the ethnographic approach taken by the authors, who conducted a six-year study to gather and interpret the dispersed memories of Easton's historically integrated interethnic neighborhood, Syrian Town. Ruuska commended the detailed narrative diversity and the critical analysis of themes such as place loss, the language of blight, and nostalgia as a driving force for change. The review also touched upon broader theoretical concerns, such as Saskia Sassen's concept of the "logic of expulsion," and how the spatial privileging of a few leads to widespread social and economic exclusion. Ruuska said that Smith and Eisenstein effectively argued for the resilience of social memory and community practices despite top-down regulations, using Easton's gentrified neighborhood as a case study.
