= Fallsville Splash Park =

Water park in Niagara Falls, New York

- Location: Niagara Falls, New York, United States
- Coordinates: 43.0855°N 79.0539°W
- Owner: Private (1988–1991, 2005); City of Niagara Falls (1992–1998); Seneca Gaming Corporation (2006–)
- Opened: 1988, 1992, 2005
- Closed: 1991, 1998, 2006
- Previous names: Niagara Splash Park
- Operating season: May through September
- Status: Defunct[[]]
- Area: 18.9 acres (7.6 ha)
- Pools: 2 pools

Fallsville Splash Park was a water park located in Niagara Falls, New York. It was adjacent to the former Niagara Falls Convention Center.

== History ==
The park originally opened as Niagara Splash Park on May 29, 1988 as part of a large development in downtown Niagara Falls, NY that also included two entertainment complexes along Old Falls Street and a hotel. Construction cost was $18 million. The park struggled due to poor staffing, lack of advertising and attractions, and a high admission price, and was ordered closed in 1991 by then-Niagara Falls mayor Jake Palillo due to unpaid water bills. The city council voted to take over the park in 1992 and operated it until 1998. The park again closed and remained dormant until 2005, when it was reacquired by the original operators and received $4 million in renovations, including repair of damage caused by vandals while the park sat dormant. The park never turned a profit.

In 2006, the property was seized by New York State using eminent domain, given to the non-sovereign Seneca Gaming Corporation, and demolished. Now a vacant lot, no redevelopment activity is underway as of 2015.

Executives from the Seneca Gaming Corporation have said that a water park would add to the atmosphere of Seneca Niagara Casino and may attract families to the adjacent hotel. The area contains custom water park fixtures, which adds to the possibility that the park may be rebuilt.

== Legal issues ==
The park and the surrounding area adjacent to the Seneca Niagara Casino has been the subject of a class-action lawsuit filed by attorney John Bartolomei in October 2010 on behalf of Fallsite, LLC and several Niagara Falls residents. The Seneca Niagara Casino is located on sovereign land owned by the Seneca Nation of Indians. However, the land adjacent to the casino, including parking garages adjacent to Niagara St., the site of a former Pizza Hut on the corner of Niagara St. and John B. Daly Blvd., the Holiday Inn property on the corner of 3rd Street and Duggan Drive, the former Niagara Aerospace Museum in between 3rd and 4th Streets and Niagara Street and Wendel Way, the former E. Dent Lackey Plaza (now a parking lot) in between Wendel Way, Duggan Drive, 3rd Street and 4th Street, empty private residences on 5th and 6th Streets, and the Splash Park Property on the corner of Falls Street and John B. Daly Blvd, is owned by the Seneca Gaming Corporation. This land is not sovereign, therefore it is taxable. If taxed, the corporation would be the largest taxpayer in the City of Niagara Falls.
