= Squatting in the Netherlands =

Occupation of unused land or derelict buildings in the Netherlands

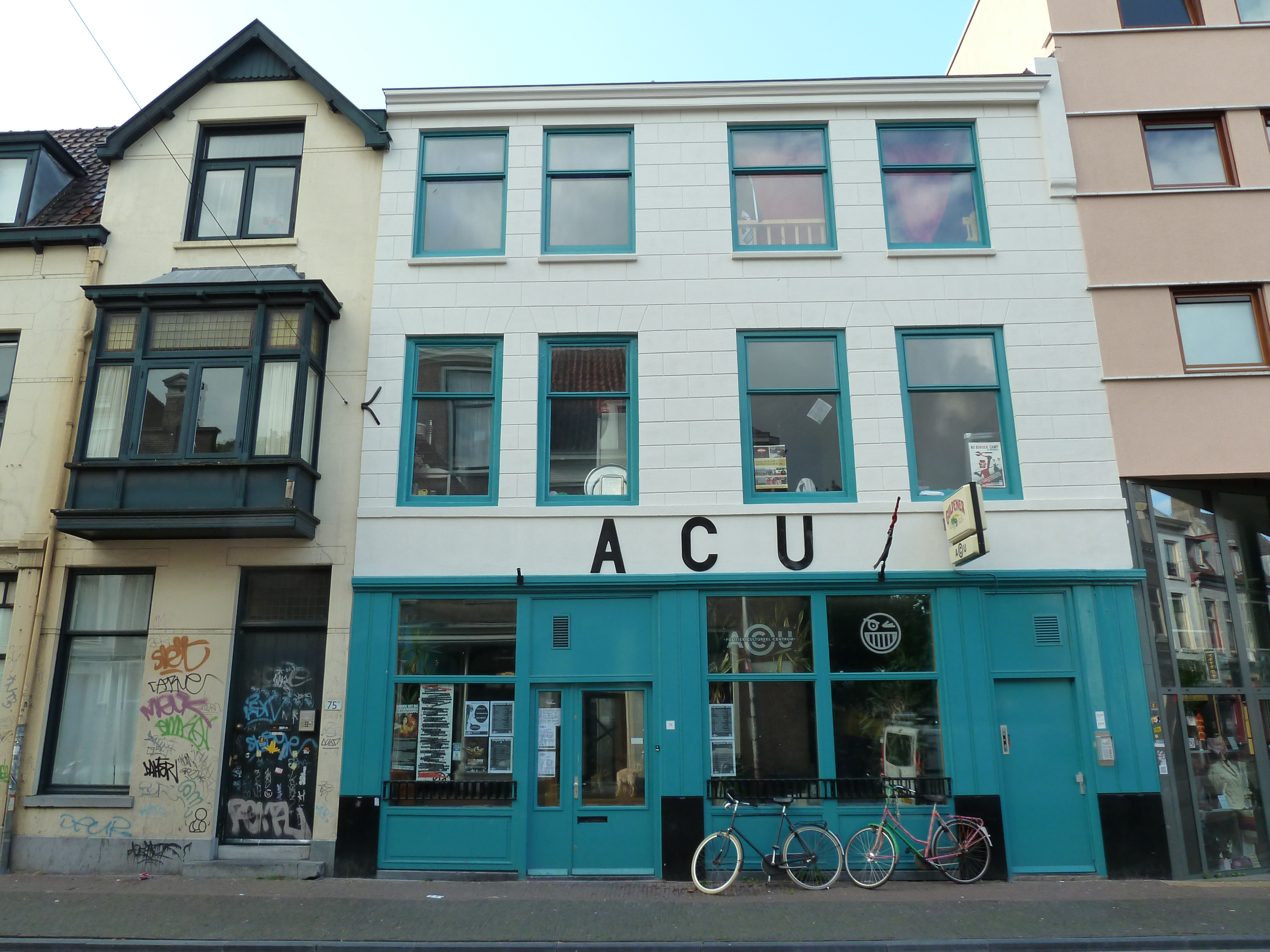
ACU in Utrecht, squatted 1976 and bought 1994

Squatting in the Netherlands (Dutch: kraken) is the occupation of unused or derelict buildings or land without the permission of the owner. The modern squatters movement (Dutch: kraakbeweging) began in the 1960s in the Netherlands. By the 1980s, it had become a powerful anarchist social movement which regularly came into conflict with the state, particularly in Amsterdam with the Vondelstraat and coronation riots.

Some squats in cities have successfully legalised into still extant social centres and housing cooperatives such as ACU in Utrecht, the Grote Broek in Nijmegen, the Landbouwbelang in Maastricht, ORKZ in Groningen, the Poortgebouw in Rotterdam and Vrankrijk in Amsterdam. There have also been squats in the countryside such as Fort Pannerden and the Ruigoord village.

Squatting was criminalised in October 2010. Between then and November 2014, 529 people were arrested. Some recent high-profile evictions have included ADM, the Tabakspanden and De Vloek. The social movement continues in diminished form, with squatting still being used by certain groups, for example the migrant collective We Are Here.

== Beginnings ==
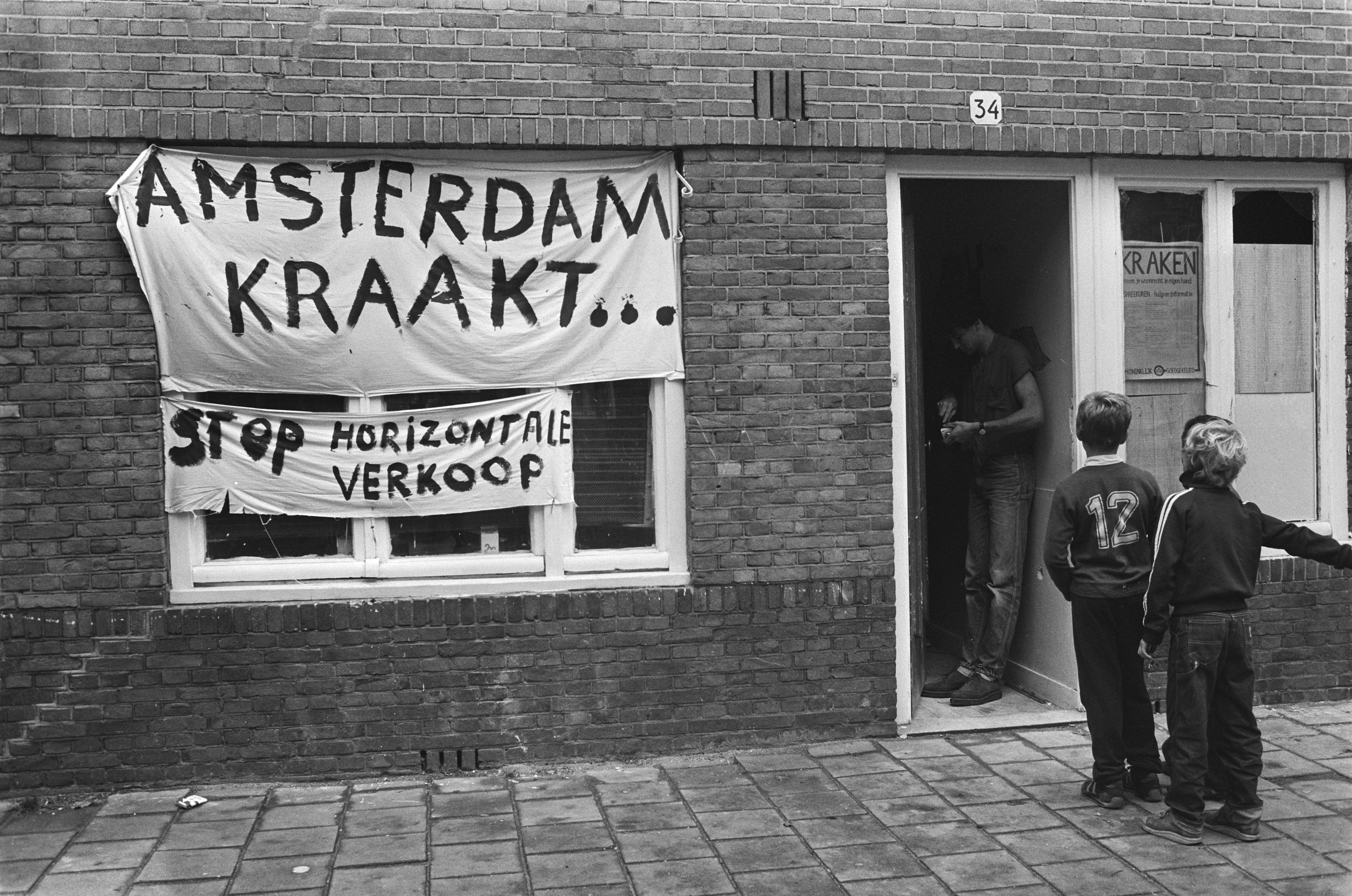
Squatted house in Amsterdam, 1980

During the Great Depression of the 1930s, many workers lost their jobs and were unable to pay rent. This resulted in people occupying houses in order to force a rental agreement, although they did not see themselves as a housing movement. Their legal justification was based on a 1914 decision by the Supreme Court which ruled that in order to show residential use in a property, all that was needed was a chair, a table and a bed.

Squatting in the Netherlands in its modern form has its origins in the 1960s, when the country was suffering a housing shortage whilst at the same time many properties stood derelict. Property owners kept buildings empty in order to speculate and drive the market price upwards. As youth protest movements burgeoned, in particular Provo movement, squatting became seen as a political, anti-speculation protest. Marking the emergence of a squatters movement (Dutch: kraakbeweging) which focused upon collective action rather than individual initiatives, the term for squatting changed from "secret occupation" (Dutch: clandestien bezetten) to "cracking" (Dutch: kraken) and squatters became known as krakers.

As well as mobilising the 1914 decision, squatters employed a 1971 Supreme Court ruling that the concept of domestic peace (Dutch: huisvrede) required permission from the current occupant for anybody else to enter a property. This meant that property owners were required to evict squatters by taking them to court, instead of forcing entry. This came about after squatters in Nijmegen were evicted from a property and prosecuted by the owner, who claimed that since the house was for sale it was in use. The squatters were convicted of an offence but appealed the decision and ultimately the Supreme Court ruled that a "on the basis of normal language use, 'a house in use' can only mean 'a house in use as a house'".

== Consolidation ==
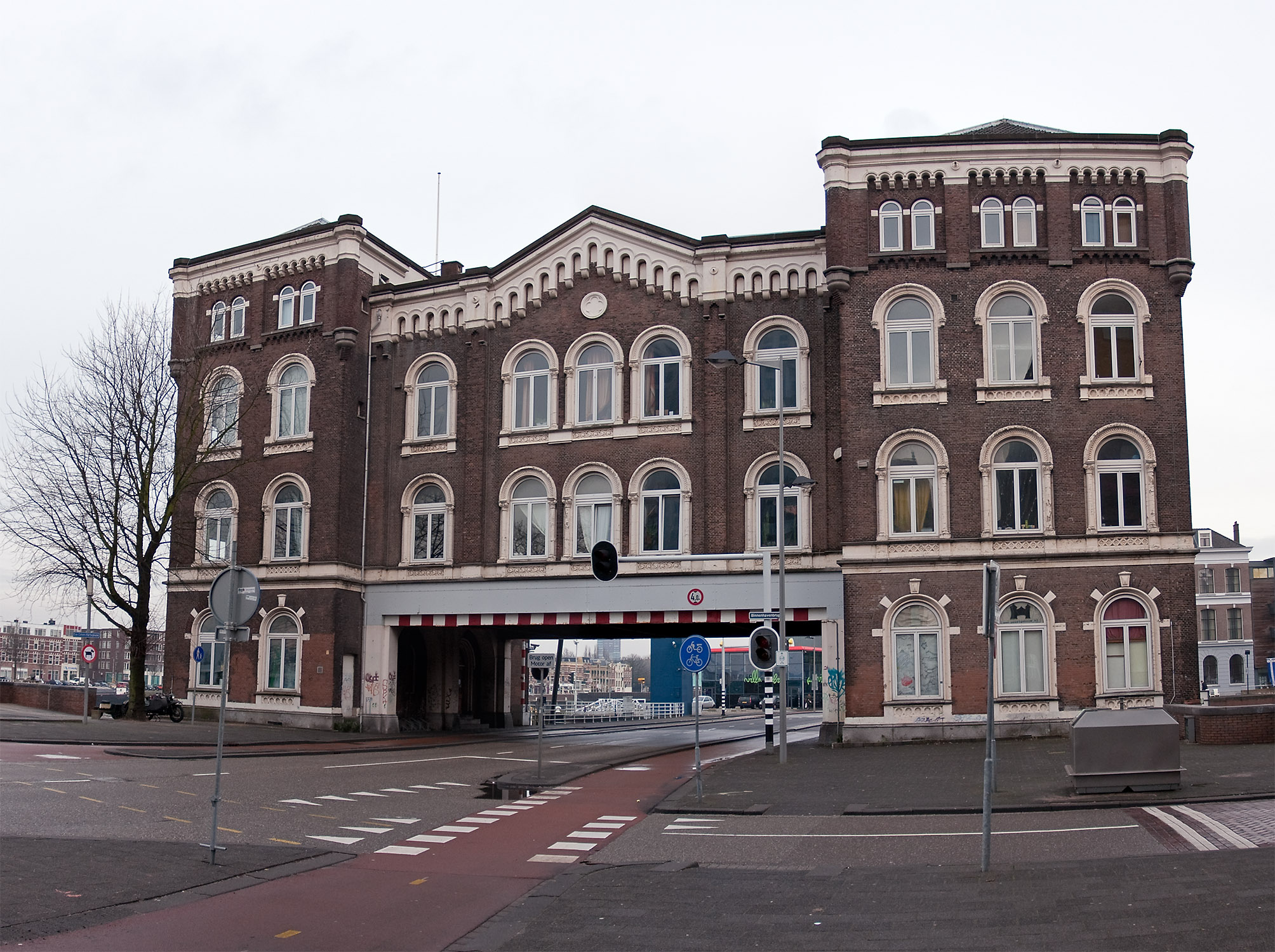
The Poortgebouw in Rotterdam.

The squatting movement took on an increasingly anarchist tone during the 1980s. In the Vondelstraat Riots, police moved to evict residents from a squatted building on the corner of Vondelstraat in Amsterdam, but it was immediately reoccupied and barricades erected. Street fights ensued between riot police and the squatters, with the building only being cleared when an armoured engineering vehicle demolished the street barricades. Queen Beatrix's coronation later that year saw more riots when squatters chanted "No home, no coronation" (Dutch: Geen woning, geen kroning). In Groningen the eviction of the WNC (Wolters-Noordhoff Complex) squat in 1990 led to 137 arrests and the mayor called it war.

Some squats have gone through a process of legalisation, in which the building becomes owned or rented by the former squatters. In Amsterdam, the city council bought 200 buildings in the early 1980s, handing them over to housing associations which then made contracts with individual tenants. The Poortgebouw in Rotterdam was squatted in 1980 and two years later the inhabitants agreed to pay rent to the city council, forming a housing cooperative of 30 people with a bar and alternative venue on the ground floor. In Amsterdam, OCCII, OT301 and Vrankrijk are all examples of legalised social centres. In the 2010s, Vrankrijk hosts mainly punk and queer parties. The NDSM former shipyard zone was recognised as a cultural hotspot and breeding place, successfully institutionalising in the early 2000s. The Grote Broek in Nijmegen was squatted in 1984 and legalised in the 2000s. The ACU in Utrecht was squatted in 1976 and bought by the squatters in 1994. It provides a venue space for benefit concerts, an anarchist library, a bar and a vegan restaurant. ORKZ, or the Old Roman Catholic Hospital (Dutch: Oude Rooms-Katholieke Ziekenhuis), is located in Groningen on the Verlengde Hereweg. The hospital was squatted in August 1979 and legalised in 1986. As of 2004, 250 people lived there in 235 apartments. Another 150 people made use of the ateliers. A derelict parking lot was taken over and made into a guerilla garden. Herbs and vegetables were grown in raised beds, fruit bushes were planted and an apiary was set up. The garden was legalised by the city council in 2012.

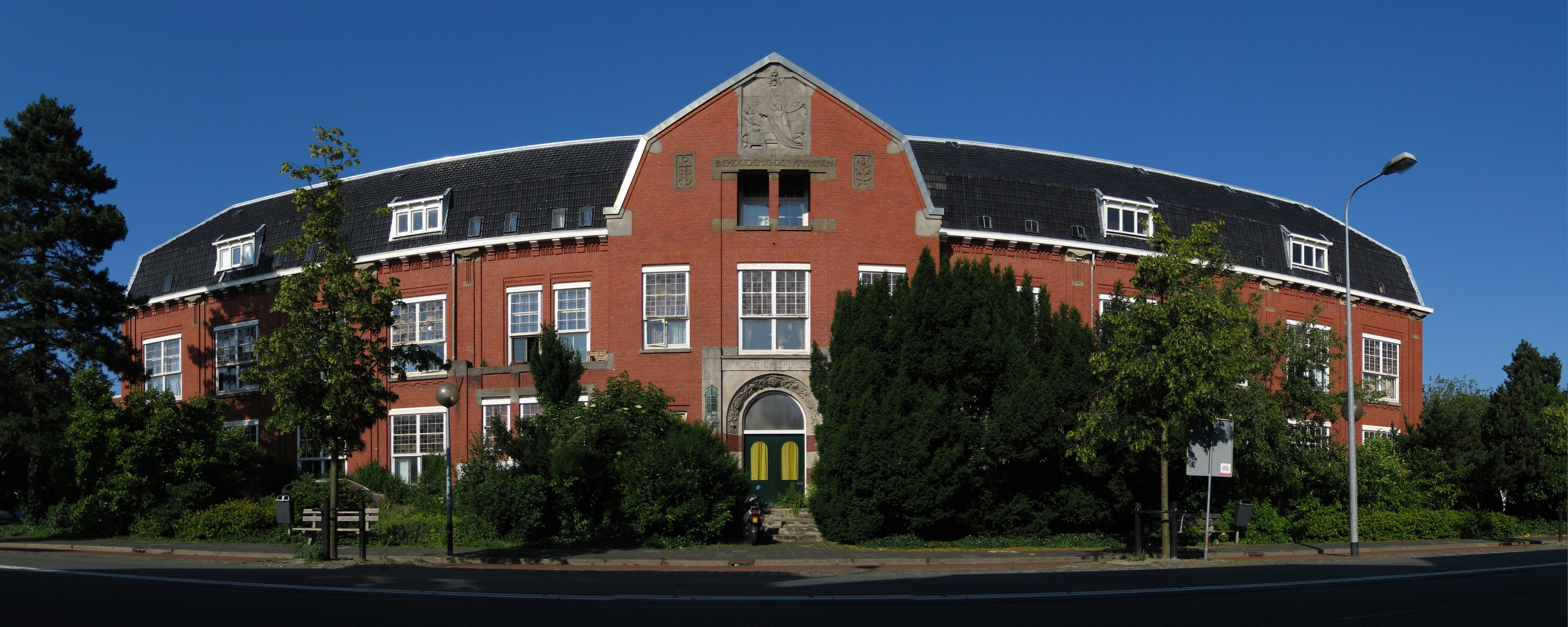
Oude Rooms-Katholieke Ziekenhuis (ORKZ) Groningen

There are also squats which refused or were unable to legalise such as De Blauwe Aanslag in The Hague, Het Slaakhuis in Rotterdam, ADM in Amsterdam and the Landbouwbelang in Maastricht. The Landbouwbelang is a former grain silo beside the Meuse (Dutch: Maas) river which houses 15 people and provides space for art exhibitions, music events and various festivals. Vrijplaats Koppenhinksteeg in Leiden was occupied in 1968 and eventually evicted in 2010. The complex, which included a bar, a freeshop, a library meeting rooms and offices for a group supporting illegal migrants, had been negotiating with the city council in order to legalise its activities until the talks stalled in 2008.

There are also some squats in the countryside such as a squatted village called Ruigoord near Amsterdam. Fort Pannerden (a military fort built in 1869 near to Nijmegen) was occupied in 2000 by people concerned about the state of the building. It was evicted on November 8, 2006, by a massive police operation which used military machinery and cost one million euros. The fort was then re-squatted and the occupiers discussed a settlement with the local council and Staatsbosbeheer, the owner.

== Developments ==
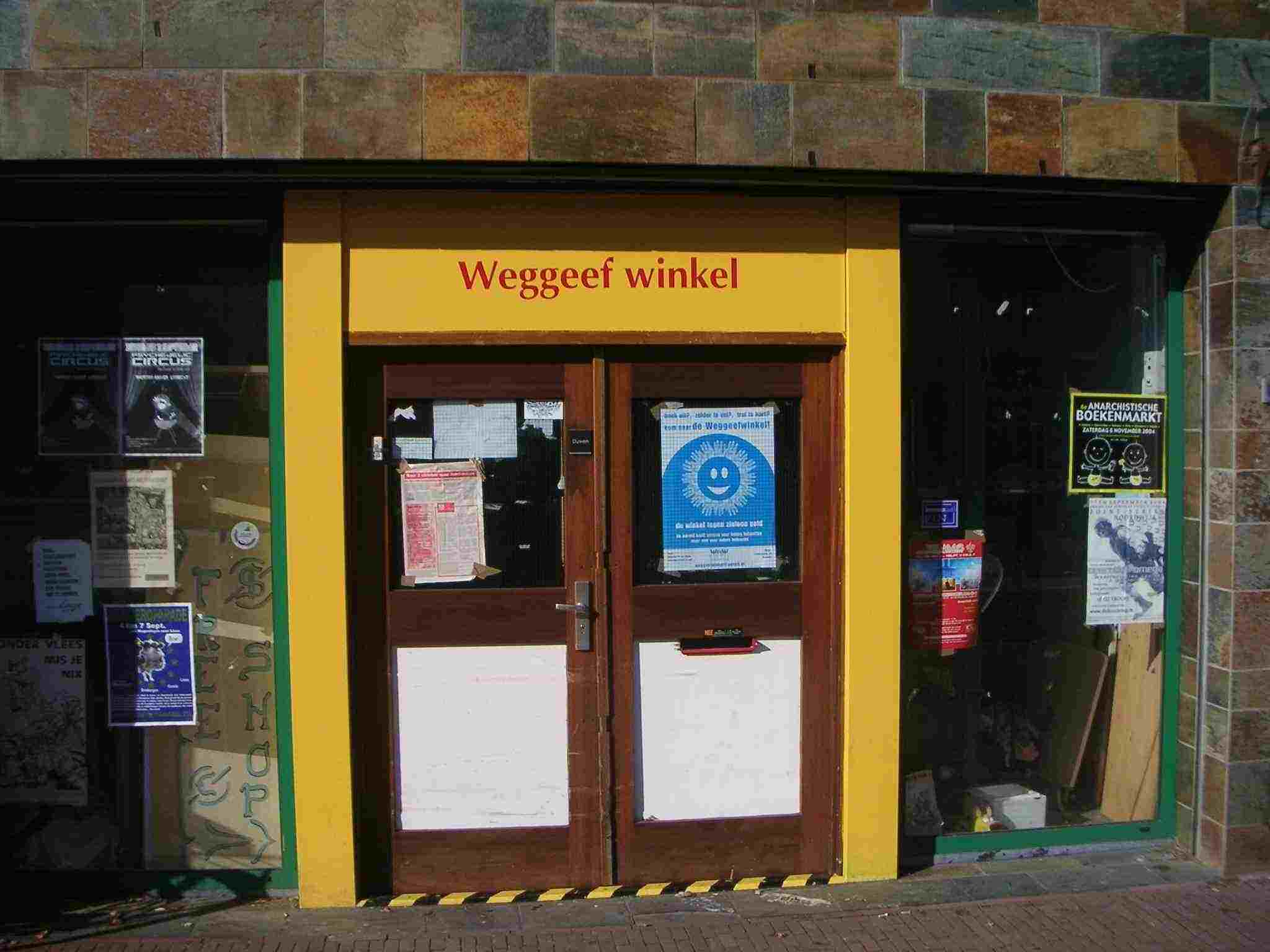
A squatted freeshop in Utrecht, 2004

In 1987, the law was changed so that an owner could take anonymous squatters to court, rather than being required to know their names. A law was passed in 1994 which made it illegal to squat a building which had been empty for less than one year. After this, it became conventional for squatters to call the police after occupying a building and if the police were satisfied that the building had been empty for more than a year and that the squatters were living there (as evidenced by having a chair, a table and a bed) then the owner would need to make a court case to regain possession. Thus, squatting became a tactic to provide housing and also to fight speculation, conserve monumental buildings, provide groups with spaces and so on. An example of conservational squatting is Huize Ivicke in Wassenaar, a building which the owner refuses to repair. The villa was placed on a list of the most endangered monuments in Europe and it was squatted in 2018 by people wanting to prevent further dilapidation.

Squatting in the Netherlands, particularly in Amsterdam, became a rather institutionalised process, although the squatters movement continued to evolve with one development being the occupation of large office buildings by refugee collectives. One such group, We Are Here was established in 2012 and the collective had squatted over 30 buildings and parks by the end of 2017. In a different development, squatting was used as a tool to contest the construction of the Betuweroute, a freight railway route from Rotterdam to Germany. GroenFront! and other environmental protestors occupied several houses due to be demolished. This included a failed attempt to squat a building in Angeren.

== Criminalisation ==
Squatting ban sign

Squatting in the Netherlands became a criminal offence on 1 October 2010. In 2016, a report was published by the Dutch Government which stated that between October 2010 and November 2014, 529 people had been arrested for the new crime of squatting, in 213 separate incidents. Of these arrested, 210 received convictions and 42 were found not guilty.

Following criminalisation, in Amsterdam an estimated 330 squats were evicted in two years. Contested evictions included ADM, the Tabakspanden on Spuistraat, the Valreep and Villa Friekens. ADM was a former shipyard squatted for 21 years before its eventual eviction in 2019. Around 130 people lived there in buildings, boats and temporary structures. De Vloek social centre in The Hague was evicted in September 2015 after long political struggle. There were seven arrests. In Utrecht, the disused Amsterdamsestraatweg Water Tower was occupied repeatedly in protest at the criminalisation of squatting. In 2019, a resquat was unsuccessful.

== Table of notable squats ==
Squatting in the Netherlands
Name	Location	History (green=ongoing, pink=closed)	Reference
ACU	Utrecht	squatted 1976, legalized 1994	
ADM	Amsterdam	squatted 1997, evicted 2019	
Amsterdamsestraatweg Water Tower	Utrecht	squatted 1980s, 2013, 2014, 2017, 2018	
ASCII	Amsterdam	various squats 1999–2006	
Blauwe Aanslag	The Hague	squatted 1980, evicted 2003	
Effenaar	Eindhoven	squatted 1970, legalized 1971	
Fort Pannerden	Near Nijmegen	squatted 2000, evicted 2006, resquatted 2006, legalized 2006, renovated 2009	
Grote Broek	Nijmegen	squatted 1984, legalized 2000s	
Huize Ivicke	Wassenaar	squatted 2018	
Landbouwbelang	Maastricht	squatted 2002	
Moira	Utrecht	squatted 1983, later legalized	
NDSM	Amsterdam	squatted 1990s, legalized 2000s	
OCCII	Amsterdam	squatted 1984, legalized 1989	
OT301	Amsterdam	squatted 1999, legalized 2006	
Poortgebouw	Rotterdam	squatted 1980, legalized 1982	
Ruigoord	Near Amsterdam	squatted 1972	
Slaakhuis	Rotterdam	squatted 2003, evicted 2011	
Tabakspanden	Amsterdam	variously squatted 1983 onwards, all evicted 2015	
Tetterode	Amsterdam	squatted 1981, legalized 1986	
Ubica	Utrecht	squatted 1992, evicted 2013	
Vloek	The Hague	squatted 2002, evicted 2015	
Vossiustraat 16 (squat)	Amsterdam	squatted 2022	
Vrankrijk	Amsterdam	squatted 1982, legalized 1991	
Vrijplaats Koppenhinksteeg	Leiden	squatted 1968, evicted 2010	
WNC	Groningen	squatted 1985, evicted 1990	
Wyers	Amsterdam	squatted 1981, evicted 1984	

== See also ==
- Squatting in Australia
- Squatting in England and Wales
- Squatting in the United States
- Anarchism in the Netherlands
