= De Vloek =

Former squatted social centre in the Netherlands

- Interactive map of De Vloek
- Address: 127 Hellingweg
- Location: Scheveningen
- Coordinates: 52°05′50″N 04°15′55″E
- Type: Self-managed social centre

Construction
- Opened: 2002
- Closed: 2015
- Demolished: 2015

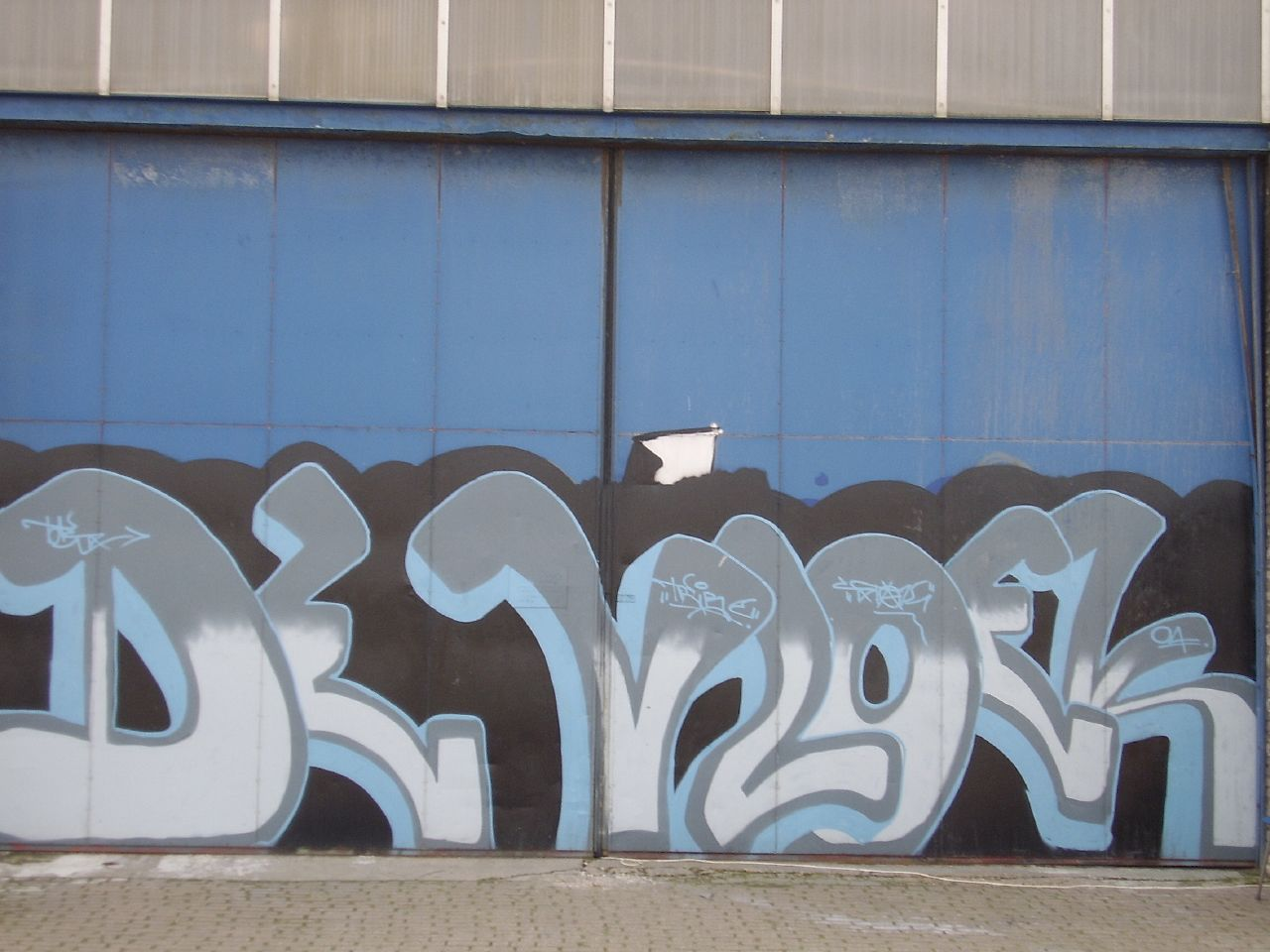
Entrance doors with graffiti saying De Vloek

De Vloek (Dutch pronunciation: [də ˈvluk]; 'The Curse') was a squatted, self-managed social centre in The Hague, the Netherlands, between 2002 and 2015. Located on Hellingweg 127 in Scheveningen, beside the North Sea, the squat hosted workplaces, living spaces, a venue, and a vegan restaurant. The local council tolerated the occupation until 2014, when it decided to sell the building. A political struggle over the eviction began; some political parties supported the squatters and the Scheveningen Pier was briefly occupied as a protest action. A deal was made for the squatters to move to a former school building and the Vloek was eventually evicted in September 2015.

== Activities ==
Carrying on from De Blauwe Aanslag, which was squatted between 1980 and 2003, De Vloek was occupied on 5 June 2002. It was located on Hellingweg 127 in Scheveningen, beside the North Sea. The following year, the municipal council decided to tolerate the occupation as a cultural project. De Vloek hosted workplaces, living spaces, practice room for bands, a concert venue called the Piratenbar ("Pirate Bar") and the organic vegan restaurant Water en Brood ("Water and Bread") which had started at De Blauwe Aanslag.

The self-managed social centre was used by hundreds of people every week and all activities were run by volunteers, with no external funding. During a 2013 street exhibition, the 60 metre long side of the Vloek building was painted by 17 artists, who worked for 14 days on the project.

== Eviction ==
In 2014, the council entered into an agreement with property developers to demolish the existing buildings and deliver the site. When the plans were announced to evict the Vloek and build a new sailing centre with tenants including Koninklijk Nederlands Watersport Verbond, a local political debate began. On one side, the squatters suggested it was better to build the centre elsewhere, and stated another sailing centre had already been opened five years previously and it was mostly empty. Supporters included city councillor Joris Wijsmuller of the Haagse Stadspartij (HSP, Hague City Party) who had built the bar at the Vloek himself, the Partij voor de Dieren (Party for the Animals) which called it "one of the pearls of Scheveningen" and the Socialist Party, which echoed the concerns that there was already an unused sailing centre elsewhere. On the other side, the local branch of the VVD (People's Party for Freedom and Democracy) had been calling since 2011 for the squat to be evicted and the CDA (Christian Democratic Appeal) also supported eviction.

In order to bring attention to the Vloek's campaign against eviction, fifteen people occupied the Scheveningen Pier in August 2014. It had been derelict since October 2013, having gone bankrupt. The squatters dropped a banner saying "De Vloek moet blijven" ("The Vloek must stay") and lit flares; they were evicted the same day. By September 2015, 44 participants in the Vloek had moved their activities to a former school building in Moerwijk which had been offered to them by the city council. The contract was signed for 10 years with a break clause after 5. In a deal brokered by Wijsmuller, the council agreed to give the building rent free and the former squatters agreed to pay maintenance and electricity. Martin Wörsdörfer of the VVD called it a "reward for bad behaviour". Other Vloek participants declared they would resist the eviction and made a call out for solidarity. As a last step, they announced the Vloek was seceding from the Netherlands and therefore no longer subject to its laws.

On Wednesday 9 September 2015, the Mobiele Eenheid (Dutch riot police) began to evict the Vloek, whilst being bombarded with paint bombs. The police placed a shipping container on the roof using a crane and entered through a hole cut in the roof. Five squatters were arrested inside the building and afterwards two more were brought down from a crow's nest constructed above the building, making the number of arrests seven in total. One week after the eviction, the building was demolished.

In June 2017, four of the squatters were charged with violence against the police because, by throwing paint bombs, they had allegedly damaged five vans, two cars and two water cannons. The state asked for a prison sentence of two weeks and a fine of 500 euros for each person, also requesting a fine from a fifth person involved. In addition to the state charges, the council demanded a fine totalling 50,000 euros from ten people, which was then reduced to 33,000 euros. An appeal was made to reduce the fine, but the council demanded the full amount before the appeal was heard.

== See also ==
- ADM (Amsterdam)
- Huize Ivicke
