= WNC (squat) =

A self-managed social centre in Groningen evicted in 1990

Coordinates: 53.2191°N 6.5642°E

The WNC squat (Wolters-Noordhoff Complex) was a self-managed social centre in Groningen, the Netherlands. It was squatted in 1985 and evicted in 1990.

== Occupation ==
The Wolters Noordhoff Complex (WNC) was a former printers occupied on 26 November 1985, by the "hardest core of the squatters." The building was located on the Oude Boteringestraat in Groningen and became a social centre with diverse activities. These included a bookshop, a feminist café, pirate radio, a recordshop, a rehearsal space and a music venue.

== Murder ==
On 20 April 1990 (a month before the eventual eviction), the body of a 22 year old squatter called Marco was discovered on the Poststraat, near to the WNC complex. Marco put on the Black Sky radio show broadcasting from the WNC. At first, the police suspected he had committed suicide since there was rope both around his neck and hanging in his room. But the pieces of rope did not match and it became more likely that Marco had been murdered by a German punk nicknamed Satan after they had quarrelled over the love of a woman called Karin. Karin and her friends smuggled Satan out of Groningen and he was never charged with a crime. He later burnt down a squat in Berlin. The police investigated the case in 1990, in 1999/2000 and in 2004/2005, but it was only in 2015 when more witnesses statements came to light that it could be concluded that Satan had indeed murdered Marco.

== Eviction ==
After the squatters provoked a riot in order to provoke the planned police action, the eviction took place on 26 May 1990. There were 137 arrests and Mayor A.A.M.F. Staatsen termed it "war." The WNC was demolished the next day. At the first trial of the squatters, the prosecution asked for 9 month jail sentences and complained that previously the police had been unable to arrest people who committed unspecified crimes and then escaped into the WNC. The prosecution said the squatters had organised the eviction resistance for months in advance and asked people to come from other cities. They had barricaded themselves in the building and behaved like army units. The police had found sharpened iron bars, smoke bombs and paint bombs. The squatters' lawyer replied that since the state had no real evidence of violent disorder it was relying on the charge of criminal organisation.

== See also ==
- ACU (Utrecht)
- De Blauwe Aanslag
- Grote Broek
- Vrijplaats Koppenhinksteeg
