= Amsterdamsestraatweg Water Tower =

Water tower in Utrecht, the Netherlands

- Watertoren Amsterdamsestraatweg
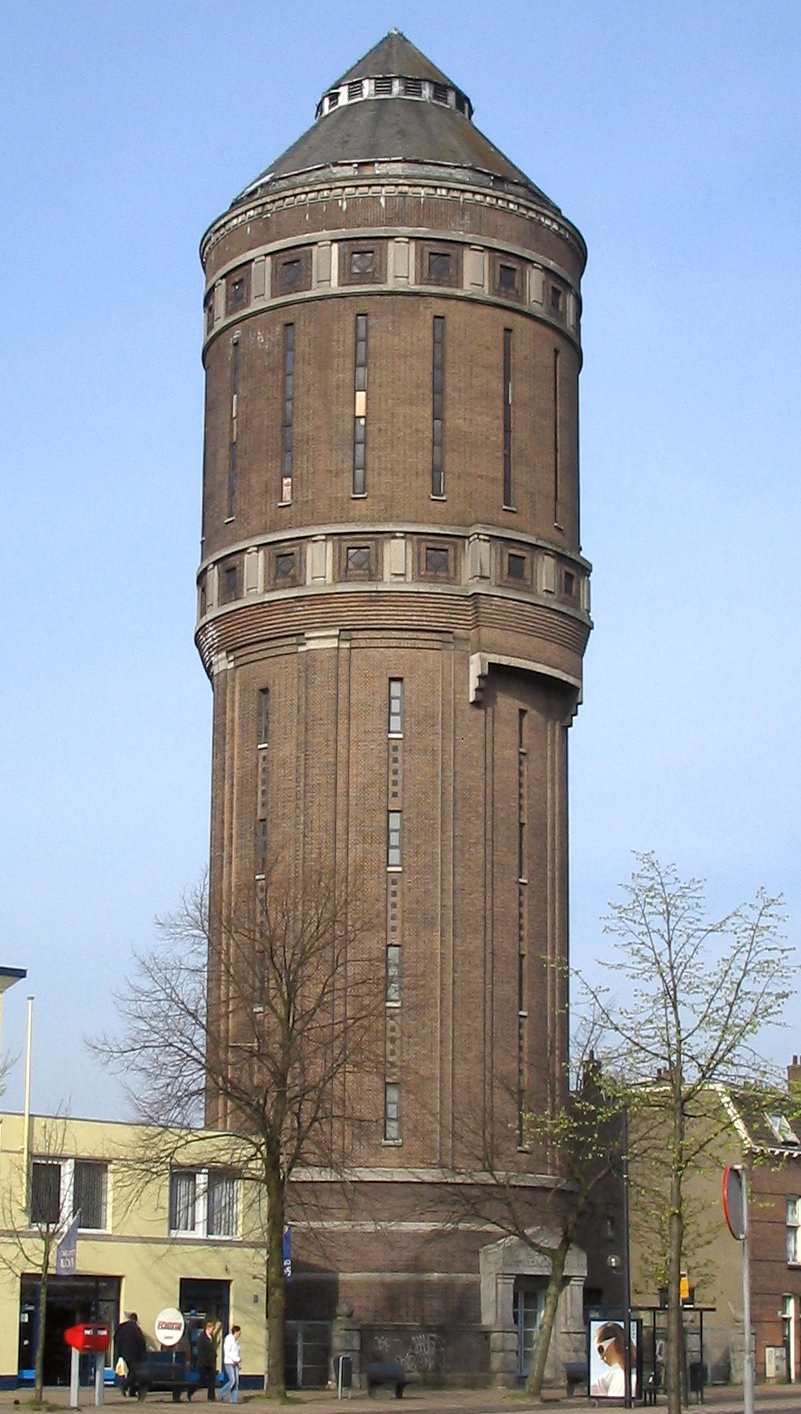
- The water tower in 2007

- Location within Utrecht (province)

General information
- Status: Redeveloped
- Type: Water tower
- Architectural style: Amsterdam School
- Location: Amsterdamsestraatweg 380, Utrecht, Netherlands
- Coordinates: 52.103°N 5.095°E
- Completed: 1916
- Renovated: 1989, 2020
- Owner: Chris Visscher

Height
- Height: 42 m (138 ft)

Design and construction
- Architect: W.K. de Wijs
- Designations: Water tower

Renovating team
- Architect: Zecc Architecten

Website
- watertoren.nu

The Amsterdamsestraatweg Water Tower is located in Utrecht, the Netherlands. The water tower was built at Amsterdamsestraatweg 380 in 1916, in the style of the Amsterdam School. It became derelict in 1986 and was repeatedly squatted before its redevelopment into apartments began in 2020.

== History ==
The water tower was built in 1916 at Amsterdamsestraatweg 380 in Utrecht, in the style of the Amsterdam School. The architect was W.K. de Wijs. It was the fourth tower built by Utrechtsche Waterleiding Maatschappij and it stood on what was then the border of Utrecht and Zuilen. The watertower stands 42 metres high and when in use it had a reservoir of 1000 m^{3} of drinking water.

Since 1986 it has been derelict. It was squatted for a time in the 1980s, then it was sold in 1989 and converted into office space. It became a rijksmonument in 2001.

== Protests ==
The Dutch squatting ban criminalised the occupation of derelict buildings in the Netherlands on 1 October 2010. In 2013, the water tower was squatted for three months. It was squatted again in 2014 by the same people in protest at it being left derelict. The building was then purchased by Chris Visscher who intended to make a restaurant in the tower and live above it.

The tower was occupied in October 2017, as a protest both against it being left empty and more generally against the criminalisation of squatting, which had occurred seven years earlier. Squatters took possession of the building at 14:00 and the police began to evict at 17:00. Seven people were arrested, six inside the watertower and one outside, for insulting the police. In the eventual court case, the group of six stood trial. One person was sentenced to a prison sentence of 7 days, because he had previously been convicted of the same offence (of squatting). The other five squatters received a fine of 500 euros. The judge did not agree with the defence's argument that people should not be convicted for making a protest, saying "Squatters are free to go to demonstrations and promulgate their ideals, but those ideals do not permit them to indulge in criminal activity."

In 2018, the building was again occupied, precisely eight years after criminalisation. It was evicted one day later and four squatters were arrested. They released a statement which said "In the last eight years, house prices have rocketed and the need for housing has also increased [...] Government and owners are not held responsible and not enough is done with long term empty properties".

Squatters attempted to occupy the building again in August 2019, but were unable to do so.

== Redevelopment ==
The owner Chris Visscher had stated in 2014 that the tower would be converted into a restaurant and four flats by mid 2015. He intended to convert the former reservoir into an apartment for himself with 360° views over Utrecht. In February 2020, the work finally began.

The architects, Zecc Architecten, have also redeveloped water towers in Sint Jansklooster (into a look-out tower), Den Bosch (into a restaurant and office), Lutten (into a bed and breakfast) en Soest (into housing).

== See also ==
- Squatting in the Netherlands
- Moira
- Ubica
