= Valreep =

Building in Amsterdam, the Netherlands

- Op de Valreep

General information
- Status: Redeveloped
- Address: Polderweg 620
- Town or city: Amsterdam
- Country: Netherlands
- Coordinates: 52.3576°N 4.9357°E

Website
- valreep.org

Op de Valreep was a squatted building in Amsterdam, the Netherlands. Occupied in 2011, the former animal shelter was converted into a self-managed social centre. The squatters resisted eviction with creative actions, such as pretending the council had given them ownership and making spoof election materials. They were forcibly removed in 2014; the building was later converted into a restaurant.

== History ==
The building in Amsterdam-Oost, a former animal shelter, was squatted on 24 July 2011 by 100 activists. The owner was Oostpoort, a consortium of developers which had demolished the other buildings in the area and left the Valreep because of its monumental status. It was derelict and completely disconnected from utilities, so the squatters restored it and began hosting activities such as concerts, films and yoga workshops. They called the self-managed social centre Op de Valreep ("just in time"). A collective was established to run the volunteer project by meetings and workgroups. Next to the building, the occupiers set up a neighbourhood garden.

The squatters engaged in creative political theatre to generate support for the project. In 2012, they made a fake press release announcing that the local council was going to hand over ownership of the building to them and invited people from the local community to attend a ceremony, at which an actor impersonating local councillor Thijs Reuten of the PvdA (Dutch Labour Party) gave the squatters fake deeds; the council was forced to issue a denial. Two years later, during the 2014 municipal elections, the Valreep collective produced fake election materials for each party which suggested the social centre was a favoured project.

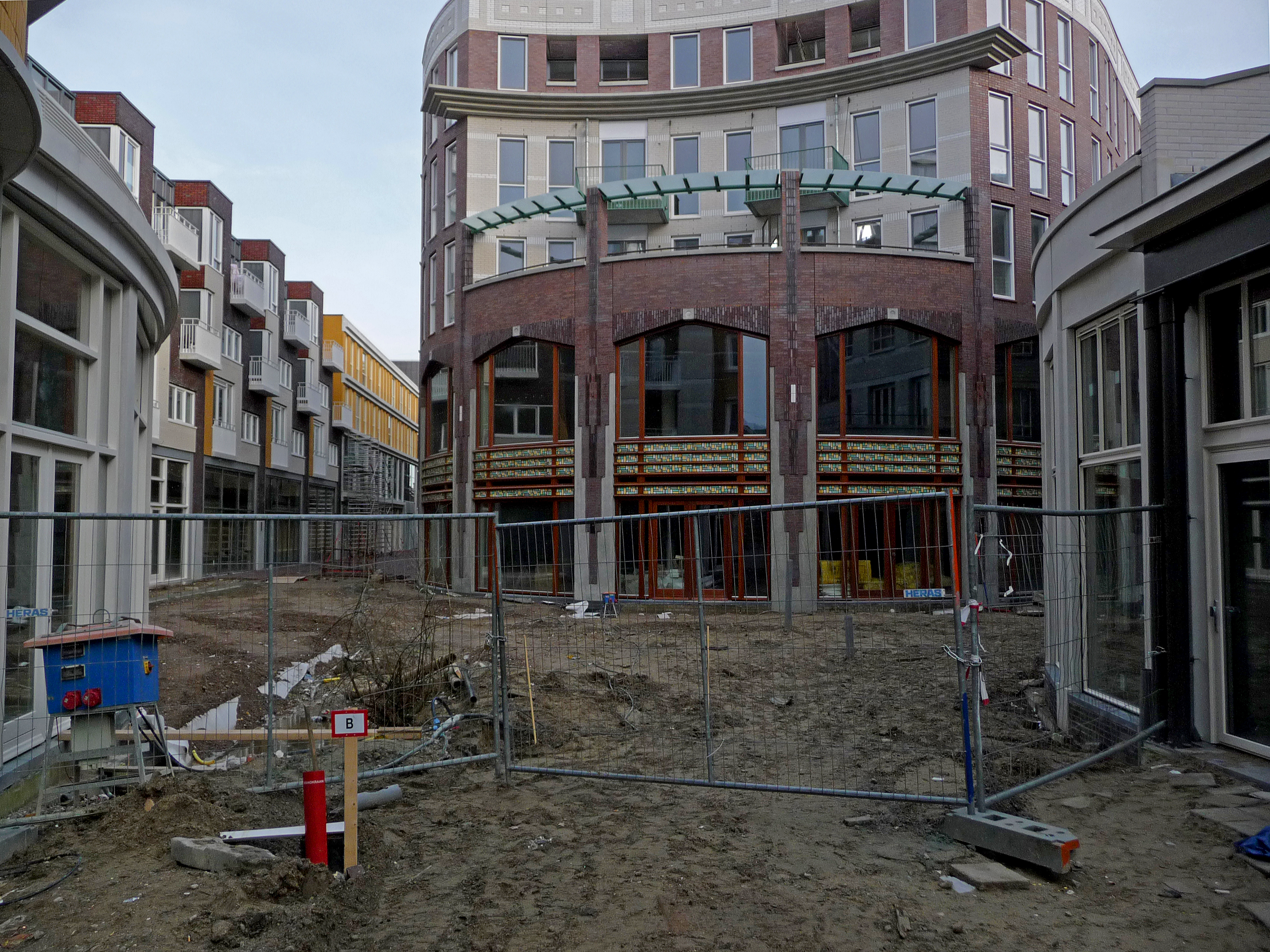
2014 development of the Oostpoort site near to the Valreep

The social centre was evicted in June 2014; the building was later redeveloped into a restaurant.

== See also ==
- Squatting in the Netherlands
