= Het Slaakhuis =

Rijksmonument in Rotterdam

Slaakhuis
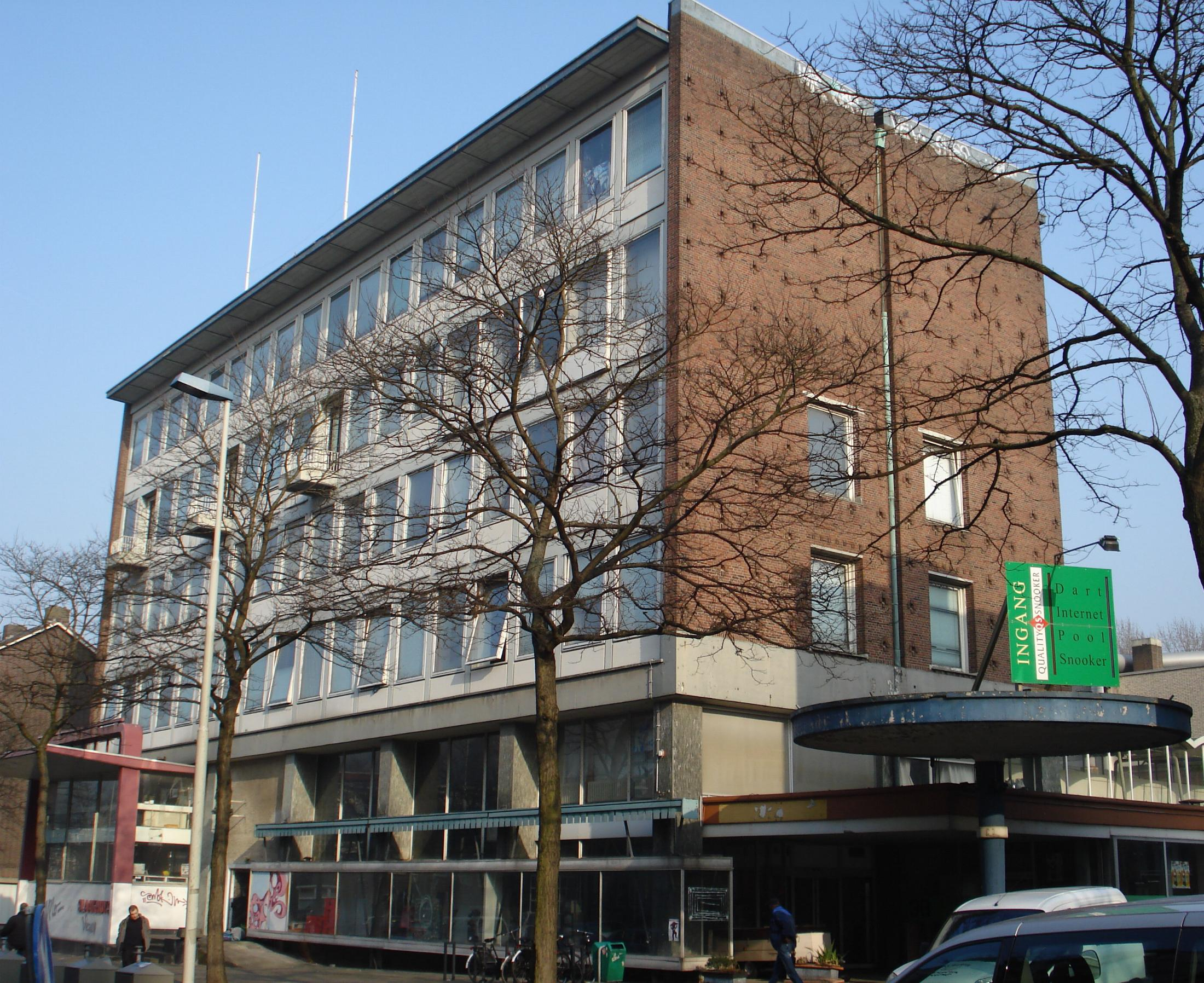
- The Slaakhuis in 2007
- Interactive map of the Slaakhuis area
- Alternative names: Slaakhuys

General information
- Status: hotel, supermarket, ex music venue, ex social centre, ex squat, ex newspaper offices
- Type: Hotel
- Location: Slaak 34, Rotterdam, Netherlands
- Coordinates: 51°55′26.96″N 4°29′57.82″E
- Opened: 1955 (built); 2003 (squatted)
- Renovated: 2017
- Owner: Het Vrije Volk (original)

Design and construction
- Architects: J.J.M. Vegter, P.A. Leupen

Het Slaakhuis, or Slaakhuys, is a monumental building in Rotterdam, the Netherlands. It was the former offices of the socialist newspaper Het Vrije Volk. The building is a six-storey office block located on a street called Slaak and was squatted in May 2003. The snooker centre next door, which hosted greats such as Ronnie O'Sullivan was also later squatted. In 2011, the complex was evicted and by 2017 it had become a hotel and a Lidl supermarket.

== History ==
The building was designed by Jo Vegter in collaboration with Pieter Arend Leupen. It was built between 1954 and 1956, becoming the offices of the socialist national newspaper Het Vrije Volk. Behind the offices (which included a bookshop and a travel agency) was the printworks and two company residences. From the 1990s onwards, the Netherlands' largest snooker centre was based in the Slaak complex. Snooker greats such as Stephen Hendry and Ronnie O'Sullivan played there. In 2007 the centre was closed and it was later squatted.

== Squatted ==
The Slaak was squatted in May 2003 as part of a national squatting action day. When initially squatted, the space hosted film nights, workshops, parties and a cafe. There was a free shop and lessons were taught in Dutch and kung fu. It also hosted a shop from WORM on the ground floor. From 2006 onwards, the squatters were in negotiation with the owner (PWS) and the city council about the Slaakhuis being used as the base for a community art education project. It was declared a national monument. In 2011, the squatters were evicted from the office block and from the snooker centre a few months later. The office block was renovated into a luxury hotel and the snooker centre became a Lidl supermarket in 2017.

== See also ==
- Poortgebouw – Monumental legalised squat in Rotterdam, the Netherlands
