= Poortgebouw =

Monumental legalised squat in Rotterdam, the Netherlands

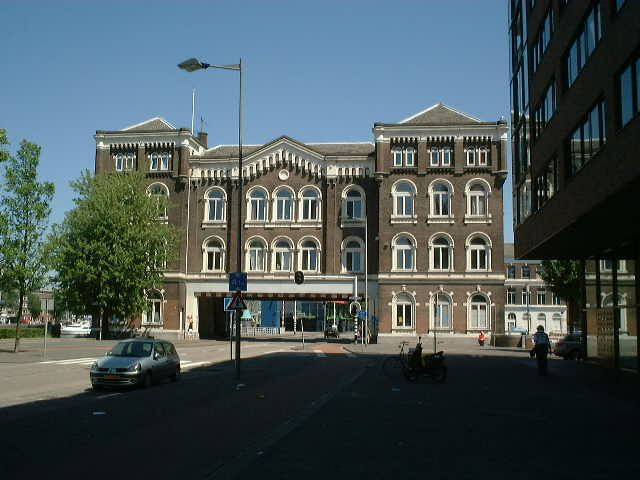
- Poortgebouw, viewed from the west
- Interactive map of the Poortgebouw area

General information
- Status: housing co-operative
- Location: Stieltjesstraat 38, Rotterdam, Netherlands
- Coordinates: 51.910278°N 4.495833°E
- Year built: 1879

Design and construction
- Architect: J. S. C. van de Wall

Website
- poortgebouw.org

The Poortgebouw is a national monument located at Stieltjesstraat 38 in the Kop van Zuid area of Rotterdam, the Netherlands. It was built beside the River Maas in 1879 and experienced a range of uses until it was squatted 3 October 1980. It had been standing empty for 2 years and was squatted as a protest intended to highlight the lack of affordable residential housing in Rotterdam.

== History ==
The Poortgebouw was originally planned as one of two identical buildings separated by water and guarding the narrow entrance to the Binnenhaven, part of the original port of Rotterdam. It is a monumental four storey brick building, with two wings and connecting floors which span the road beneath. It was intended to be the administrative headquarters of Rotterdamsche Handelsvereniging, but when the owner (L.Pincoffs) went bankrupt and fled to the United States of America the second building was not built. Later a smaller version was constructed, only to be demolished in 1937.

By the late 1970s, the building was derelict and there were unpopular plans to make it into an eroscentrum or large bordello. When the Poortgebouw was squatted, the intention was to use the building as living space and a youth centre. After much negotiation with the city council, it was agreed in 1982 that the squatters could stay as a housing association (Vereniging Poortgebouw). They would pay a low rent and undertook to maintain the inside of the building. The first rent contract was signed in May 1984.

== Activities ==
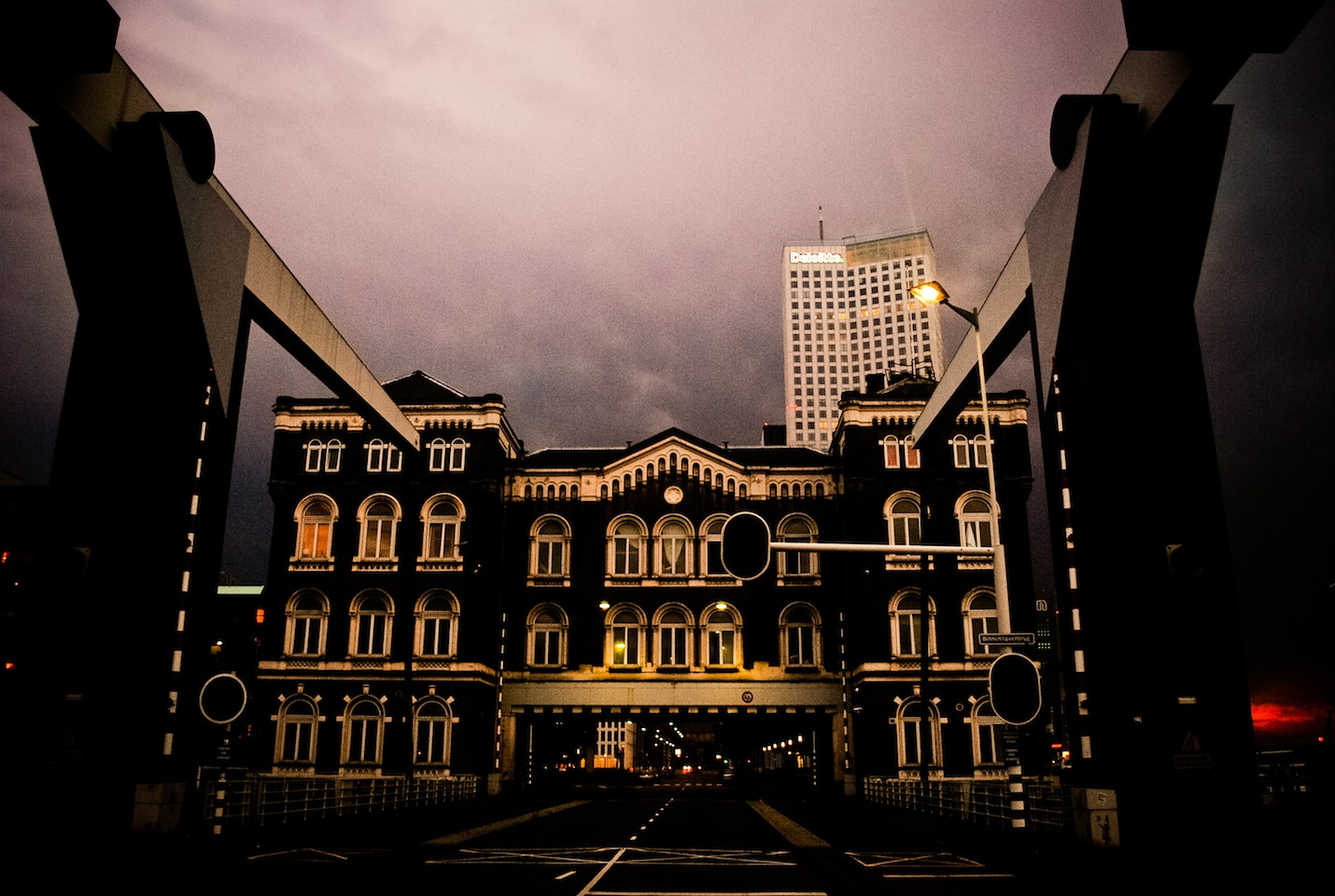
Poortgebouw, view from the east

Until 2016, the Poortgebouw had a regular Éétcafé every Wednesday evening with vegan food. There was a free shop and a voko which sold organic food at wholesale prices both of which are open to the public during the cafe from 18:00 - 21:00. Many grassroots, not-for-profit activities were held at the Poortgebouw, including music concerts (punk, ska, rock, acoustic), comedy nights, spoken word events, discussions and film nights. In the late 2000s, there was an infoshop called the Autonomous Library, which was open during the cafe and other events.

== Groene Groep ==
In July 2001 the Poortgebouw was sold by Woning Bedrijf Rotterdam (WBR), a semi-privatized company maintaining council-owned buildings, to de Groene Groep, a development company. The building was sold for 400,000 euro, which is approximately the price of a large single-family home. It was sold without the consultation of the Vereniging Poortgebouw (the Poortgebouw housing association).

From October 2004 onwards the Vereniging Poortgebouw has been fought against the decision by de Groene Groep to cancel the rental contract, evict the tenants and renovate the Poortgebouw for office space. On 17 February 2006 the Rotterdam Court of Justice gave the verdict that the rental contract was ended and no alternative housing should be offered. The judge agreed with de Groene Groep that the only means to renovate the Poortgebouw building would be by redeveloping it as office space, supporting the contention of the developers that the outside of the building needs much work. The Vereniging Poortgebouw had argued that this work was needed because both Woning Bedrijf Rotterdam and de Groene Groep had neglected their contractual obligations to ensure the outside of the building was in a good condition. The Vereniging Poortgebouw has appealed this decision at a higher court in Den Haag. In 2010, this court judged that de Groene Groep was not permitted to evict the current tenants, a major victory for the inhabitants.

In 2017, the Groene Groep sold the Poortgebouw for 750,000 euro to a new speculator.

== See also ==
- Grote Broek
- Het Slaakhuis
- Landbouwbelang
- Vrankrijk
