= Vossiusstraat 16 (squat) =

Vossiusstraat 16 is a squatted building in central Amsterdam, the Netherlands. It is owned by the Russian billionaire Arkady Volozh, co-founder of Yandex Search and formerly head of Yandex, who was sanctioned as part of international reactions to the Russo-Ukrainian War. It was occupied in October 2022 to protest both Volozh's ownership and the housing crisis in Amsterdam. Volozh quickly took the squatters to court and lost his claim for possession since he cannot live in the property or enter the Netherlands; he appealed the decision and lost again. The squatters live in the building and have organised events there.

== Background ==
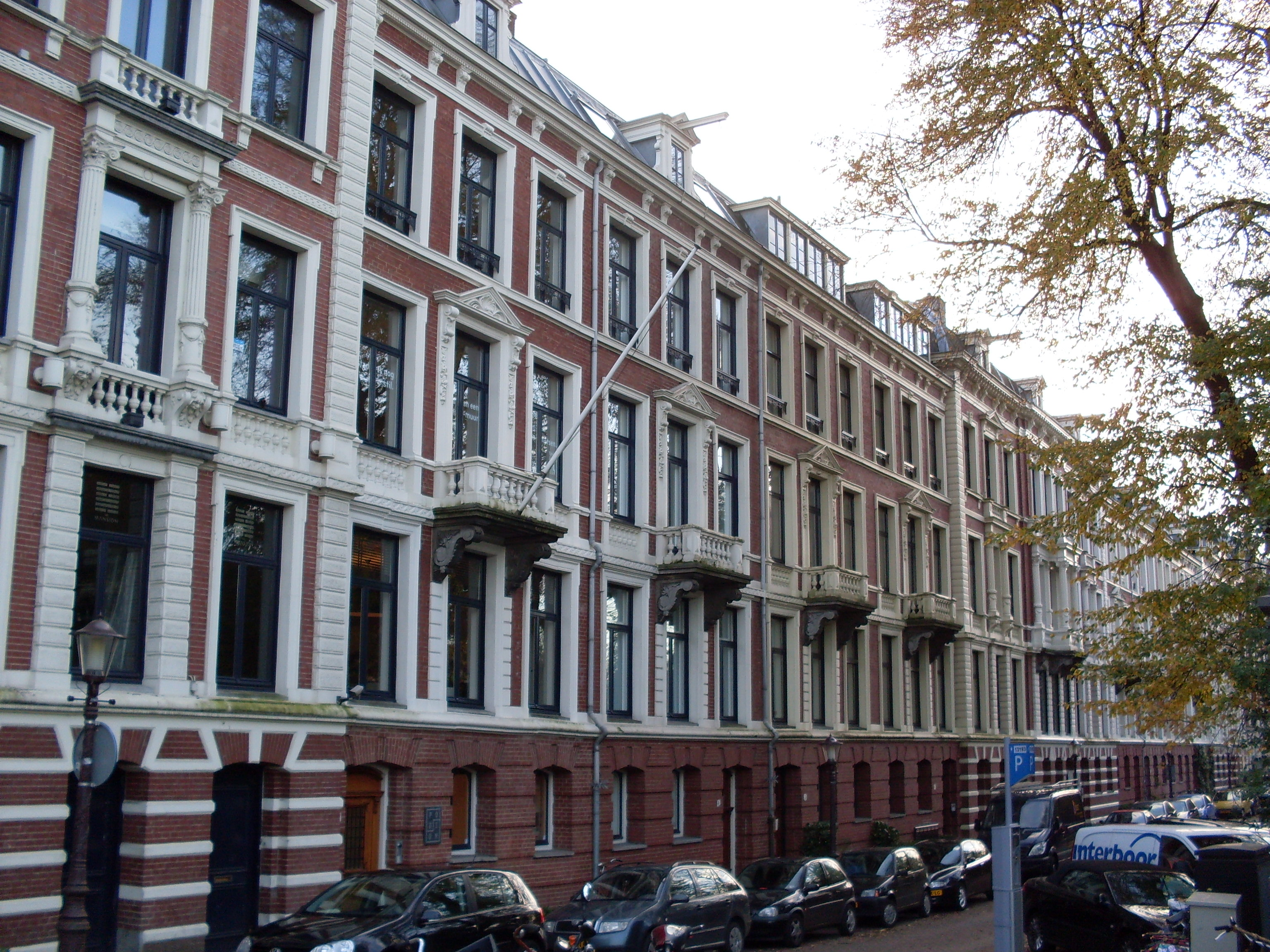
Vossiusstraat

Vossiusstraat 16 is a residential building in central Amsterdam, the Netherlands, owned by the Russian billionaire Arkady Volozh since 2018. He is the co-founder of Yandex Search. It was built in the late nineteenth-century and is located next to the Vondelpark. In 2020, Volozh asked the Government of Amsterdam to break the building into three apartments, 16 A, B and C. He owns the building through his company Paraseven, which is based in the British Virgin Islands, having bought it for €3.4 million.

Yandex Search is the most popular search engine in Russia. It has previously passed information to the Russian Federal Security Service (FSB) about opposition leader Alexei Navalny and during the Russo-Ukrainian War spread propaganda about Ukraine. Volozh was sanctioned by the European Union as part of the international sanctions imposed during the Russo-Ukrainian War and is not permitted to enter the European Union apart from Malta, where he holds a golden passport. He stepped down as chief executive officer of Yandex, the company behind Yandex Search, after being added to the sanctions list; he was removed from the list in March 2024.

== Occupation and first court case ==
Squatters occupied the building on 31 October 2022, as a protest against it both being owned by Volozh, and standing empty in the time of a housing crisis. They hung banners saying "Against war and capitalism". The following month, lawyers acting on behalf of Volozh made a claim for possession, arguing that he was renovating it and intended to live there with his wife, six children and two grandchildren. The squatters gave a statement which said "Why did they divide the building into three different addresses? Why are there SIX bathtubs? Why does each floor have its own locks?". Since Volozh himself is unable to live in the house or enter the Netherlands, the judge ruled that renovations increasing the value of the property were not permitted and that the squatters could maintain possession. The squatters then organised events in the building which included discussions about property guardianship and gentrification, a screening of a film about the Black Panthers, workshops on crochet and writing to prisoners, and concerts with Ukrainian musicians.

== Second court case ==
In April 2023, Volozh appealed the judgement of the previous court case and introduced testimony and photographs from a Ukrainian man who had pretended to be a refugee, staying at the property for two months. The spy provided screenshots from private group chats and pictures of bonfires in the garden and parties in the house. Volozh's wife Tosha argued in court that the family had been intending to live in the building and his lawyer said about the squatters "They stole a family home and turned it into a personal nightclub, where hardcore bands play and a lot of alcohol is drunk". The court of appeal ruled against Volozh, saying that evicting the squatters would lead to unnecessary vacancy, although they were also asked to limit the number of people living there and to stop making a "a sort of Vrankrijk" in a residential street.

== See also ==
- Squatting in the Netherlands
