= OCCII =

Self-managed music venue in Amsterdam

Coordinates: 52°21′16″N 4°51′19″E

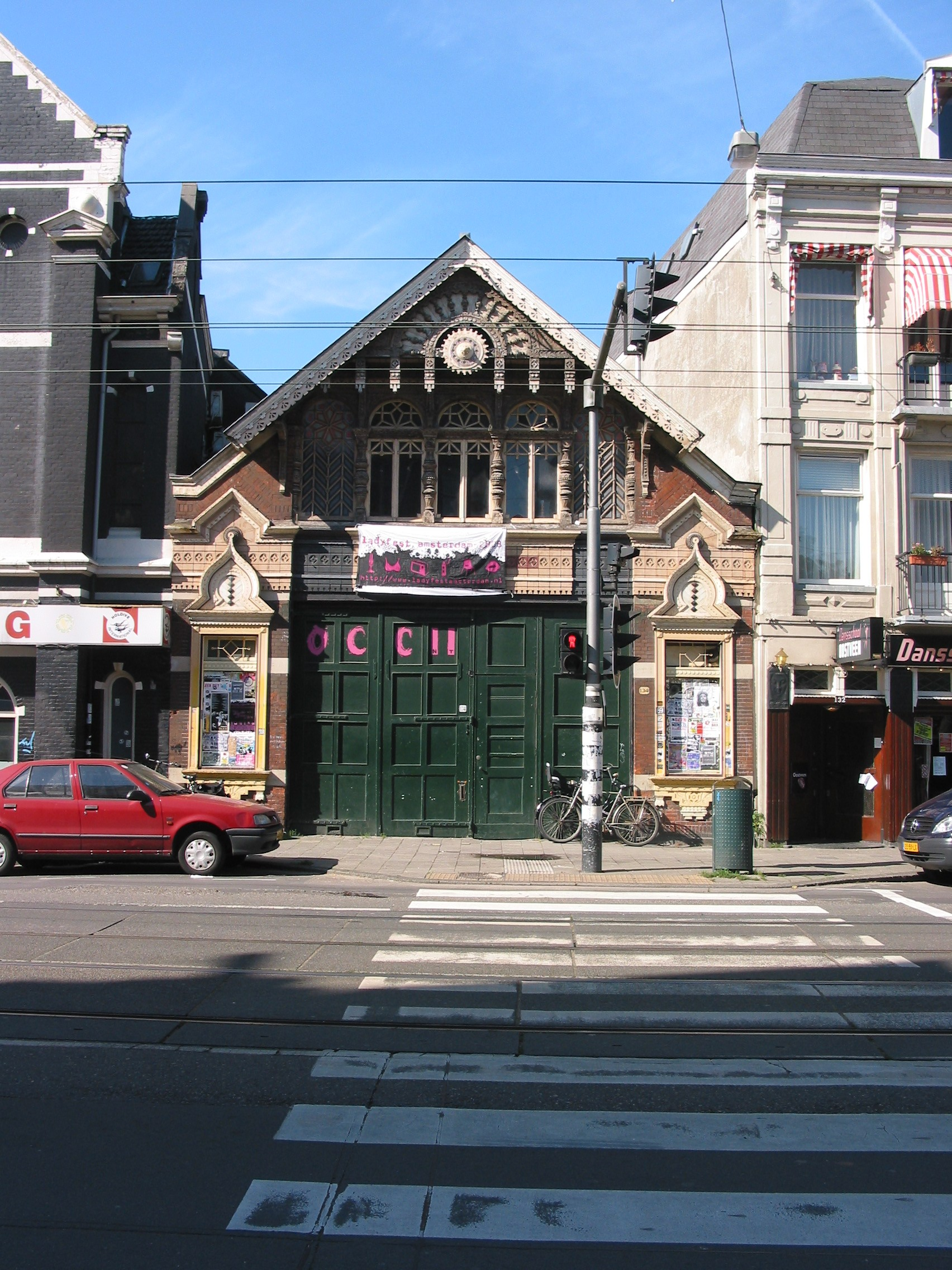
OCCII in 2008

The OCCII (Onafhankelijk Cultureel Centrum In It) is a venue for alternative and independent music at Amstelveenseweg 134, in Amsterdam, Netherlands.

The organization is mostly run by volunteers and has its roots in the squatting movement. The original building was squatted in 1984 and "legalized" in 1989. Next to the concert hall, and as part of the Binnenpret complex, there are also a café (called the Kasbah), a restaurant (called MKZ), a library (Bollox), theatre for children (Kinderpret), a bike workshop (Farafina), a sauna (Fenomeen) rehearsal studios, and a big courtyard. The sauna was closed in 2011 after a management dispute.

The building the OCCII resides in was built as a horse tram garage with stables in 1883-84 by architect Abraham Salm (1857–1915), who also designed (together with his father G. B. Salm) the buildings where popular commercial venues Melkweg and Paradiso now operate.

The OCCII has no central programming, instead there are several programming groups that set the agenda. Some of these groups are Le Club Suburbia (mostly indie and post-punk), Hex (new wave and gothic), Muziek Kapot Moet (experimental music, electronic, noise, weird pop), Spellbound (electronic, dance), The Real Amsterdam Underground (punk, hardcore, crust) and Cool Schmool (dance, indie, riot grrrl, mostly female fronted). In 2011, OCCII was listed as one of the ten best gig venues in Amsterdam.
