= Vrijplaats Koppenhinksteeg =

Evicted Dutch freespace

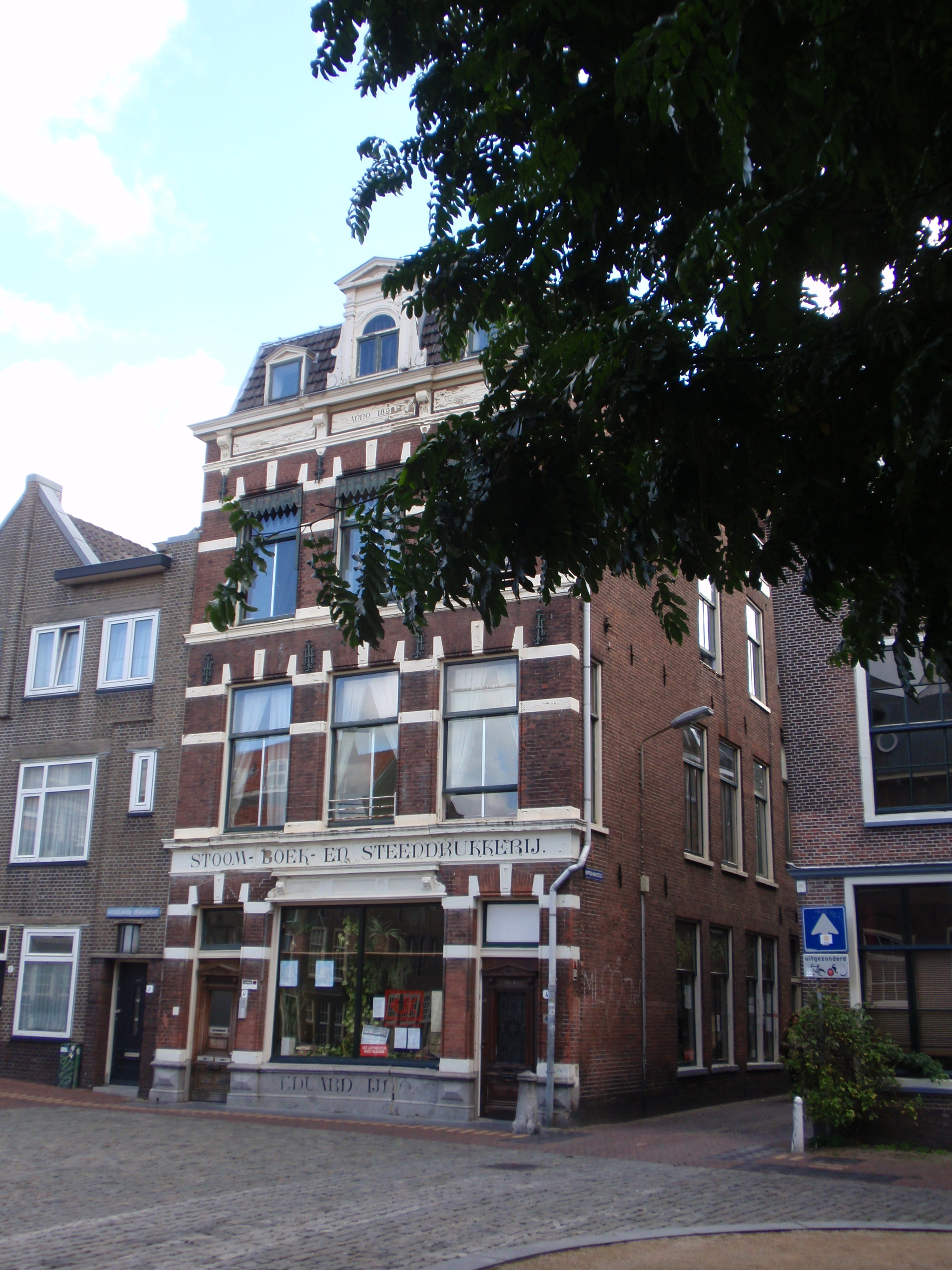
- Vrijplaats seen from Hooglandse Kerkgracht
- Successor: Vrijplaats Leiden
- Formation: 1968
- Dissolved: 2010
- Coordinates: 52.158653°N 4.497347°E
- Services: Activity centre, bar, bookshop, café, freeshop, printers, sports school
- Website: web.archive.org/web/20090415161121/http://koppenhinksteeg.nl/

Vrijplaats Koppenhinksteeg (Freespace on Koppenhinksteeg street) was a complex of buildings first squatted in 1968 in Leiden, the Netherlands. It took its name from the alley on which it was located and was run since the 1990s by the Vrijplaats Koppenhinksteeg Foundation. Various groups including Eurodusnie used the different spaces as a bar, café, a freeshop, a foundation to support undocumented migrants, an information centre, a library and a sports club. In 2010, the entire complex was evicted. From 2012 onwards a new space called the Vrijplaats Leiden (Freespace Leiden) was set up elsewhere.

== Occupation ==
The buildings which comprised the former Eduard IJdo printers complex were squatted in 1968. Initially spaces were used by a feminist printer, a leftwing bookshop and different activist groups.

== Projects in 1990s ==
- Bar en Boos (Horrible and Angry) - a bar. When it opened in 1993, the Leidsche Dagblad newspaper described it as "an angry squatters bar full of PLO scarves."
- Linkse Kerk (Las Vegas) - a café and activity centre.
- Free shop.
- Hong Ying Centre - a sports school.
- De Fabel van de illegaal - a foundation working with undocumented migrants.
- Library - with texts about antifascism, the environment, feminism and the Developing World.
- Marinus van der Lubbe room - used by groups such as a women's choir, a Syrian group and local artists
- 'Dusnieuws' - a monthly political zine.
- 'Koekoeroe Reedio' - a radio station.
- Organic chaos productions - an activist video distribution network

== 2006 problems ==
In 2006, the cafe project Linkse Kerk was shut down by police when it re-opened after refurbishments. The police stated it did not have the correct permits and did not meet fire regulations. Five people were arrested and quickly released.

== Eviction ==
Up until July 2008, the council was willing to legalize the centre. The plan was to transfer ownership to the housing association Ons Doel for 1 euro and then to renovate. When the council became more rightwing after elections, the building was sold to a property developer instead. The entire freespace was then evicted in 2010. There was an urgent appeal against the decision to evict but it was unsuccessful.

== New building ==
The Vrijplaats Koppenhinksteeg Foundation purchased a monumental building at 36 Middelstegracht in 2012. When the renovations had been carried out, the intention was to house all the groups from the previous location still needing a space. This was after negotiations for a different building on the Vrouwekerkplein had fallen through.

== See also ==
- ACU
- De Blauwe Aanslag
- Grote Broek
- Vrankrijk
- Ubica
