= Eurodusnie Collective =

Dutch anarchist collective

Eurodusnie Collective was an anarchist collective based in Leiden, the Netherlands. It was established in 1997, in opposition to a summit of the European Council at which the Treaty of Amsterdam was signed. A small school was squatted for the purpose of holding a 'counter summit' as a protest over the official EU summit. From that, a more permanent anarchist project evolved which was of national importance.

Eurodusnie (English: "Euro? No way!" as well as being a pun on Eurodisney) ran a number of projects in Leiden. The collective also convened the second European Peoples' Global Action (PGA) conference in 2002.

== School ==
Eurodusnie squatted a hotel in Noordwijk in 1997 but were quickly evicted. They then occupied a former school in Leiden on the Boerhaavelaan. This became both a place to live for members of the collective and an activity centre with many public events.

== Freespace ==
The Eurodusnie collective became involved with the Vrijplaats Koppenhinksteeg (English: Freespace on Koppenhinksteeg street) a complex of buildings first squatted in 1968. The group ran an information centre, a vegan café and a free shop. It published a zine called 'Dusnieuws' and a magazine entitled 'Geen Paniek' (Don't Panic).

== Animal rights week ==
Eurodusnie put on an animal rights week in April 1998. This involved picketing McDonald's fast food stores, workshops and a benefit concert at the Vrijplaats. The picket of the McDonald's on the Beestenmarkt on Saturday 11 April caused a disturbance. A Swedish demonstrator was arrested and another was bitten by a police dog. The picket then moved to the McDonald's on the Donkermansteeg. The activists also targeted the dolphinarium in Harderwijk and a company called Pharming which was cloning cows. When the demonstrations received negative press, Eurodusnie said that they were not actually the organisers, they were hosting a group called the Dutch Animal Rights Coalition.

== Pieing ==
Eurodusnie was associated with several actions to pie politicians. Firstly in 1998, Mayor Van der Sluijs of Noordwijk was pied, to say thanks for the eviction of the hotel since Eurodusnie were now very happy with their base in Leiden. The action was claimed by a group called TAART - Tegen Autoritaire en Antirevolutionaire Types (English: 'Against Authoritarians and Antirevolutionary Types' also 'taart' means 'cake' in Dutch).

Next, former European Commissioner Frits Bolkestein (in 1998), Minister of Finance Gerrit Zalm (in 1999) and Pim Fortuyn (in 2002) were all pied. The pieing of Zalm happened because it was not possible to reach the initial target, the President of De Nederlandsche Bank Nout Wellink since activists posing as reporters for the fictitious Arnhems Dagblad newspaper were not allowed into a press conference.

When Pim Fortuyn was assassinated, some of his supporters targeted Eurodusnie as they blamed leftwing groups for his murder. A spokesperson for Eurodusnie said about the murder "We were stunned. We are against violence and absolutely reject it." Eurodusnie denied that they had been involved with the pieing of Fortuyn, saying the action had been made by the Biotic Baking Brigade and asked for police protection, since they were receiving threatening phonecalls. The police declined to intervene and the same night, the windows of the squatted school on the Boerhoevelaan and the windows of the free shop on the Koppenhinksteeg were broken. Nobody was arrested.

== Right to the city ==
Leiden Council began in 2001 to remove young people, homeless and alcohol drinkers from the city parks, including the Burcht van Leiden. To protest this, Eurodusnie organised a party at the castle on 2 June 2002.

There was music, drumming, drinking and fire-eating. At 23.30, the police asked for the party to stop and at midnight it was violently evicted. This became a scandal at the council, with an independent witness blaming the police for being heavy-handed.

== Subsidy ==
The political parties CDA, Lijst Pim Fortuyn and VVD complained in 2005 that Eurodusnie was receiving a subsidy of 40,000 euro from the Referendum Commission to campaign against the European Union. With the money the group planned to organise a festival with music and debates.
