= Tabakspanden =

Buildings in central Amsterdam, squatted until 2015 and now redeveloped

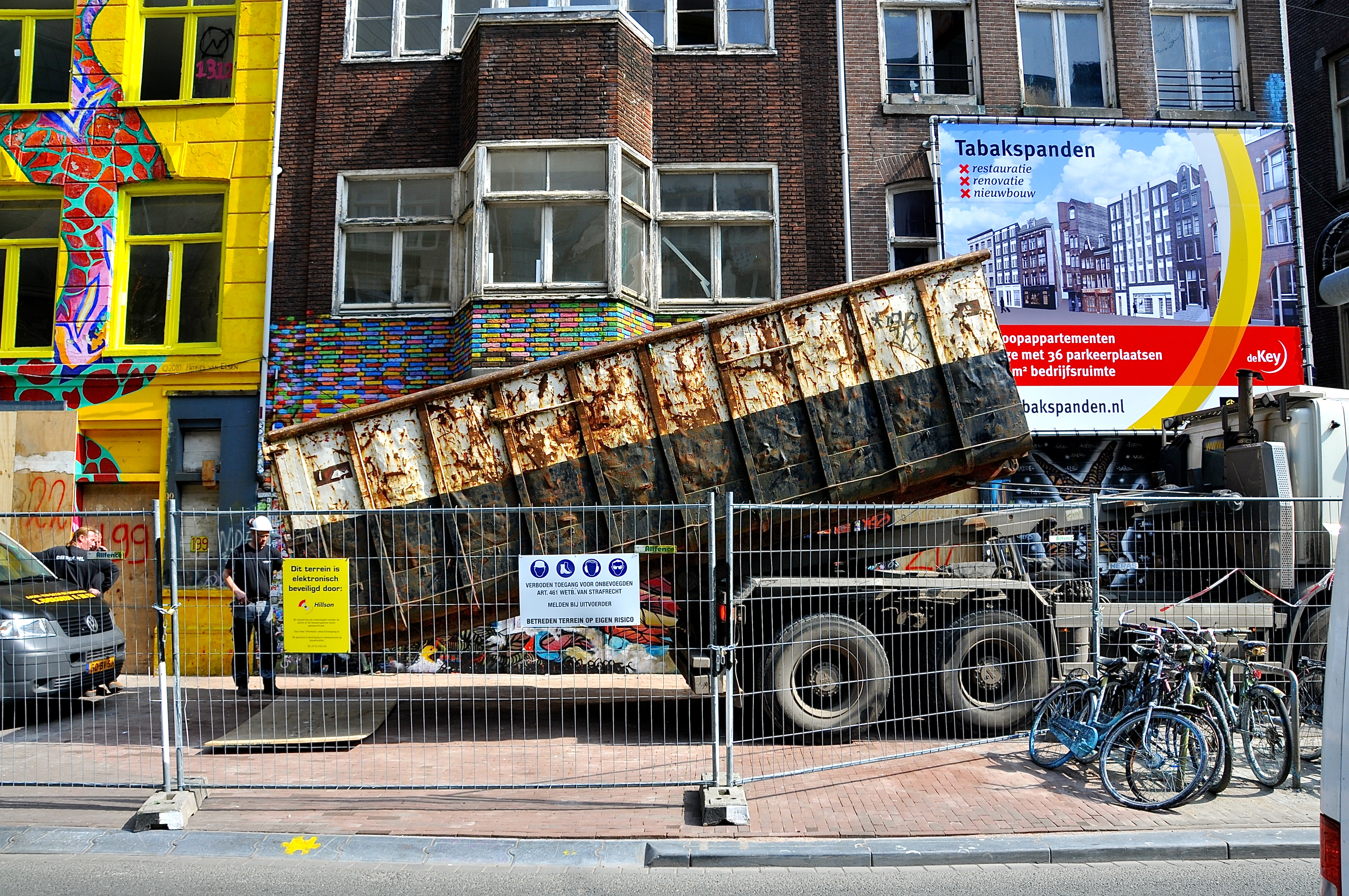
- 2015 redevelopment of Tabakspanden

- Location within Amsterdam
- Alternative names: Keizer

General information
- Status: Under renovation
- Location: Spuistraat, Netherlands
- Coordinates: 52.37173°N 4.88957°E
- Opened: 16th century
- Renovated: 2015 onwards
- Demolished: 2015
- Owner: De Nijs

The Tabakspanden are a group of buildings standing on the Spuistraat in central Amsterdam, adjacent to the Keizerrijk and Wijdesteeg alleyways. Named after a former owner, the speculator Hendrik Tabak, they were mostly squatted from 1983 onwards, although the artist Peter Klashorst also rented an apartment and gallery space. The best known building was Spuistraat 199, known as the Slangenpand (Snakehouse) because of the large mural which covered the front exterior. In 2015, the squatters were evicted and the buildings were mostly demolished prior to redevelopment. The new project is known as De Keizer and has 69 apartments, a restaurant and a gallery. Two of the buildings are registered as rijksmonumenten (national monuments).

== History ==
In the 17th century, there was a soap factory on the Wijdesteeg called De Klock. Before that, there was a brewery called Het Delftsche Wapen, also known as De Witte Eenhoorn. The ruins of these enterprises were discovered by archaeologists during the recent redevelopments. Spuistraat 199 was the former headquarters of the Algemeen Nederlands Persbureau, a Dutch news agency. Houses 223 and 225 on the Spuistraat are rijksmonumenten (national monuments).

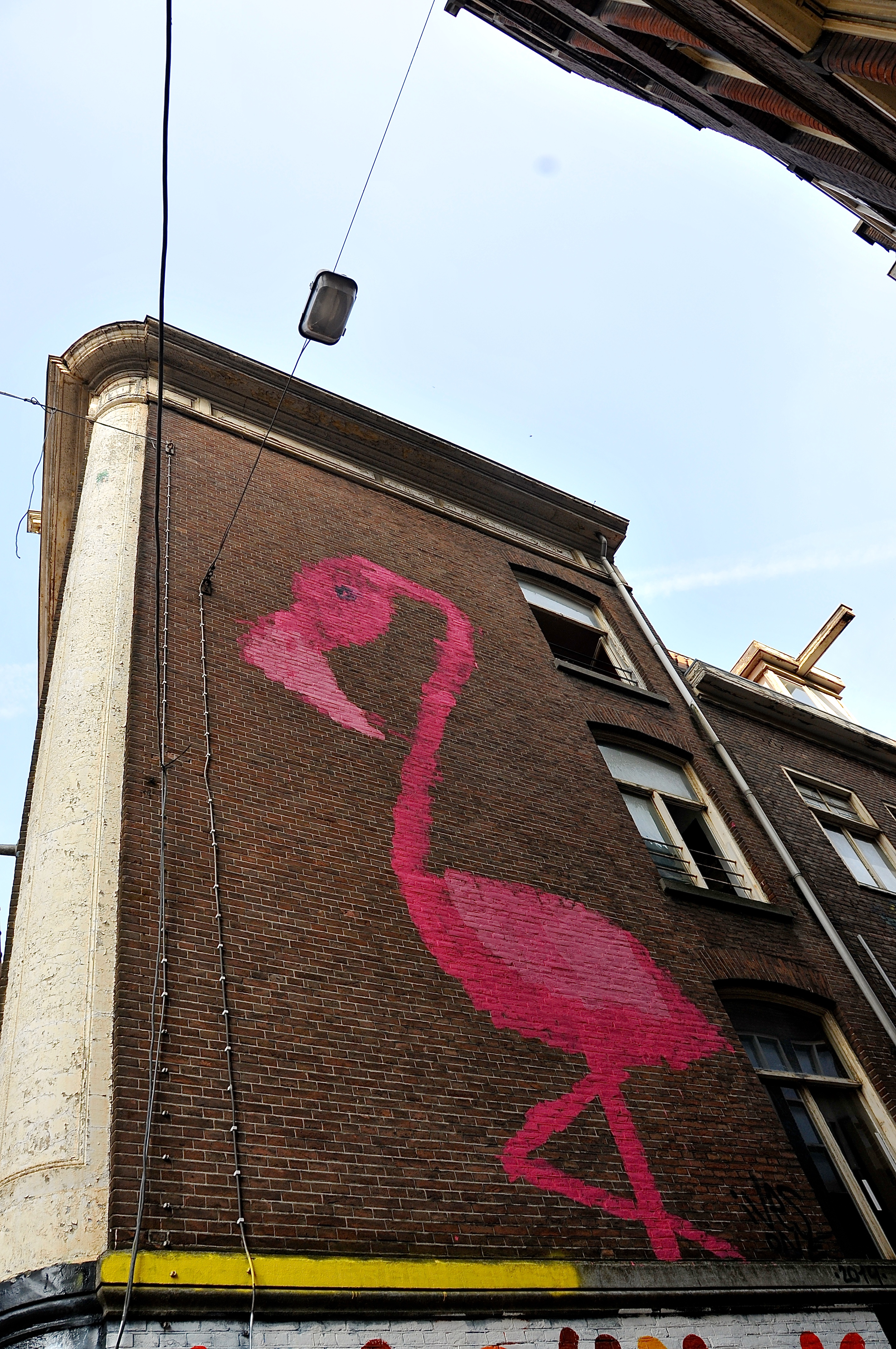
Flamingo mural 2015

The Tabakspanden are named after the speculator Hendrik Tabak, who bought the cluster of buildings after World War II. At his peak, Tabak owned 118 buildings and 800 homes across Amsterdam. In the 1970s, Tabak was attacked inside one of his own buildings on the Spuistraat and robbed of his wallet. He later died from his injuries.

The Tabakspanden consisted of two blocks, separated by the Wijdesteeg. The first block was composed of Nieuwezijds Voorburgwal 268-hs, Spuistraat 219 to 231 and Wijdesteeg 3 to 7. The second block consisted of Spuistraat 199, Spuistraat 215 and 217, Wijdesteeg 4 to 20 and Keizerrijk 3 to 11. The buildings had a succession of owners from the criminal underworld before being bought by housing association De Key in 2008.

== Squatted ==
The Tabakspanden were mostly squatted from 1983 onwards and all evicted in 2015. The buildings were relinquished by the squatters on Saturday 22 March 2015, but on Tuesday 24, a different group of squatters reoccupied the buildings as a protest against gentrification. The police then mounted a major eviction operation on the Wednesday which was screened live by local media.

Whilst squatted, the buildings housed artists and activists. The Tabakspanden were well known for their colourful facades and graffiti, with the Slangenpand (Snakehouse) easily identified by the snake painted across the front exterior of the building. The buildings were used for events such as art markets and film nights. At one stage the artist Peter Klashorst rented an apartment and gallery space which he called Cash & Carry, based at Spuistraat 219.

=== Snakehouse ===
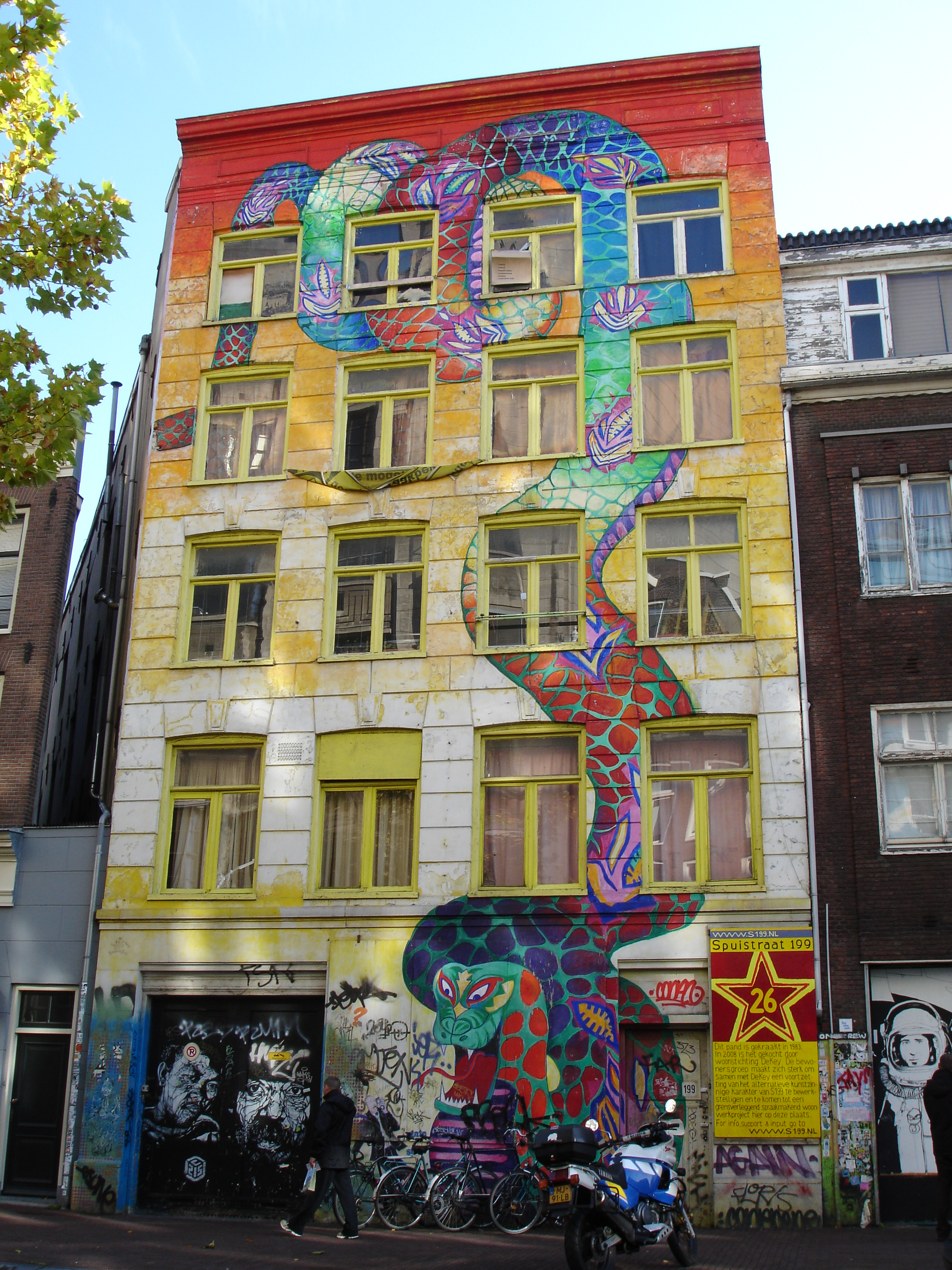
Snakehouse in 2009

The building at 199 Spuistraat was occupied on 6 March 1983, by 200 squatters while the police were busy with an Ajax Amsterdam football match. In 1990, a snake was painted on the first four metres of the building's exterior by Patries van Elsen and in 1994 it grew to cover the entire building, so 199 came to be known as the Snakehouse. After the 2015 eviction, the board with the snake's head painted on it was removed from the building and it was uncertain for a time what had happened to it. Van Elsen wanted it returned so it could be exhibited, whilst a group of squatters claimed to have taken it hostage. De Key then announced that it had been removed by a contractor to protect it from being damaged. It was then taken to the Amsterdam Museum to be shown in the 'Urban Art' exhibition. Van Elsen commented "I continue to believe that it is a missed opportunity that Amsterdam [Council] and De Key want to destroy a breeding place and urban arts zone." During the recent redevelopments, it was determined that 199 Spuistraat was constructed in the 16th century using wood from Iceland.

== Development ==
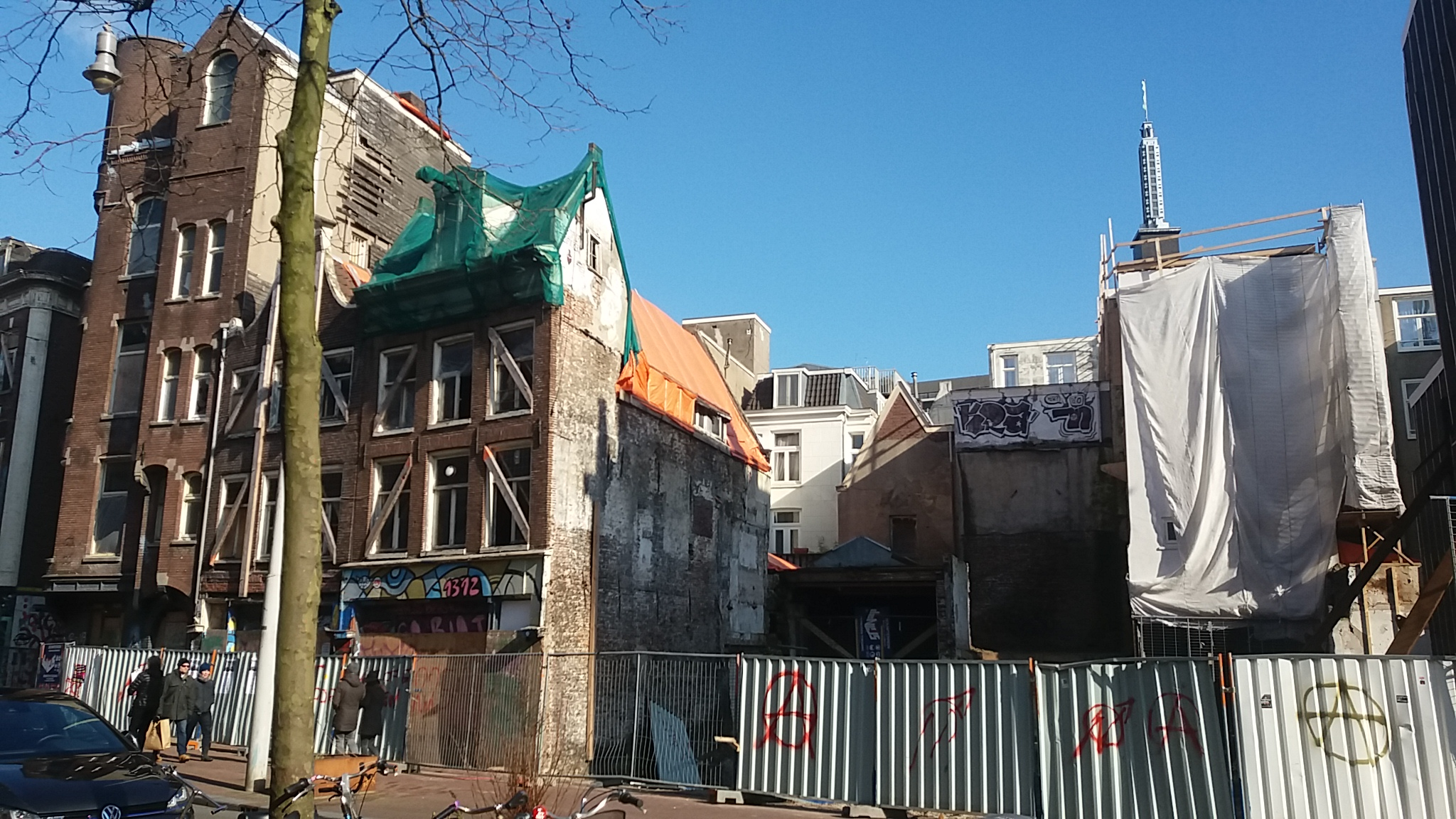
Redevelopment of Spuistraat 219 – 233 in 2016

Housing corporation De Key bought the buildings in 2008 and had held development permits since 2014. They planned to build apartments and shops, but the plan was halted following the European debt crisis, and thus the squatters stayed longer. The redevelopment project was named De Keizer and was run by project managers De Nijs, who bought the properties from De Key in 2016. They planned to build 69 apartments, a restaurant and a gallery, and to painted the Snakehouse white. Of the 69 apartments, 27 were renovated and 42 constructed, with 36 parking places.

The works were delayed on 30 April 2016, when a 51 year old German man set fire to the buildings and then jumped to his death. The price for a new apartment of 60m² was €520,000 and in the former Snakehouse, an apartment of 50m² could be rented for €1550 a month, not including utilities. By 2018, the developments were complete.

== See also ==
- Squatting in the Netherlands
- Vrankrijk
