= De Blauwe Aanslag =

Demolished building in The Hague

- De Blauwe
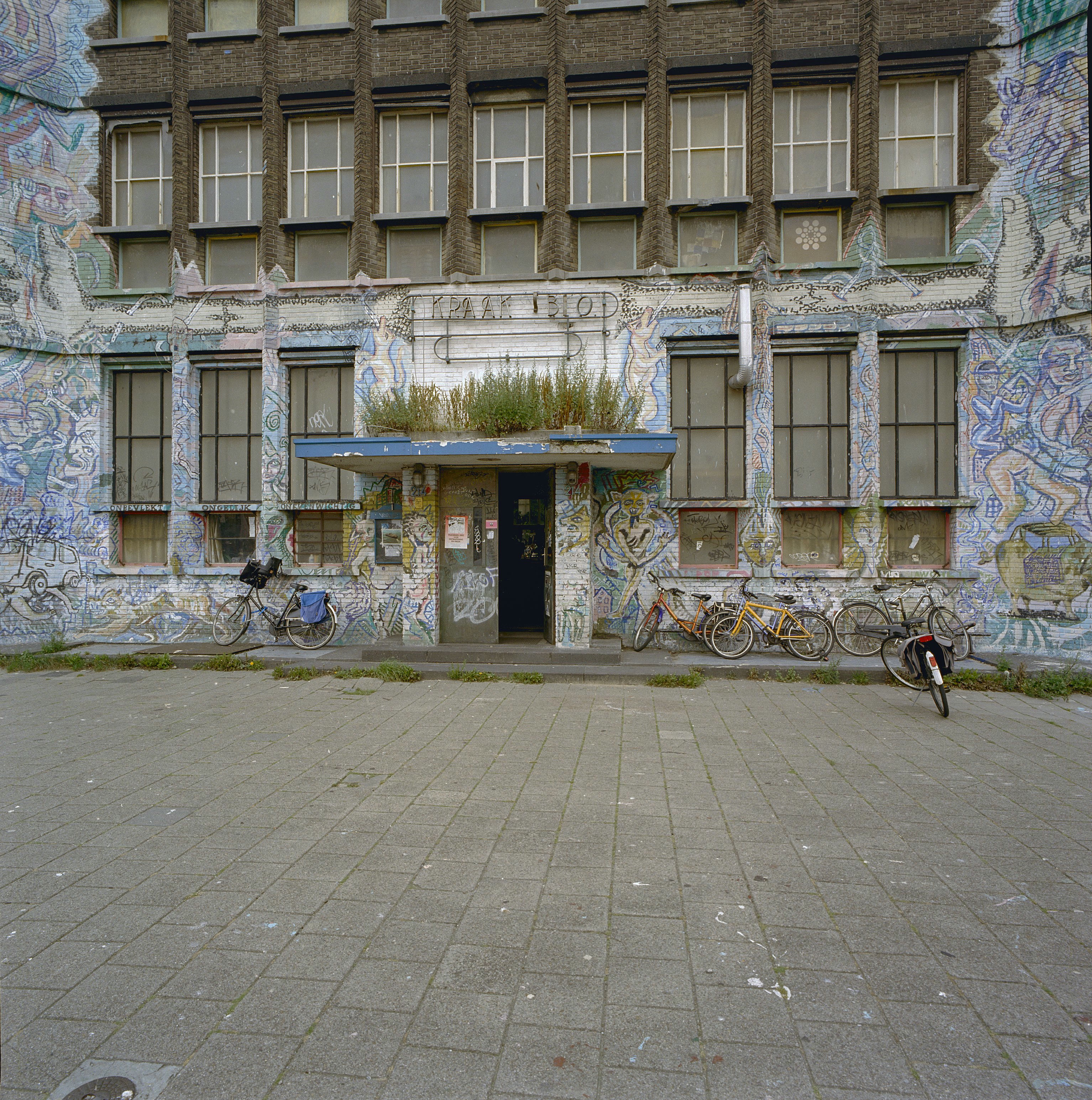
- Entrance to Blauwe Aanslag
- Interactive map of De Blauwe Aanslag
- Address: Buitenom 212-216
- Location: The Hague
- Coordinates: 52.07111°N 4.30111°E
- Type: Social centre

Construction
- Built: 1886
- Opened: 1980
- Closed: 2003
- Demolished: 2003

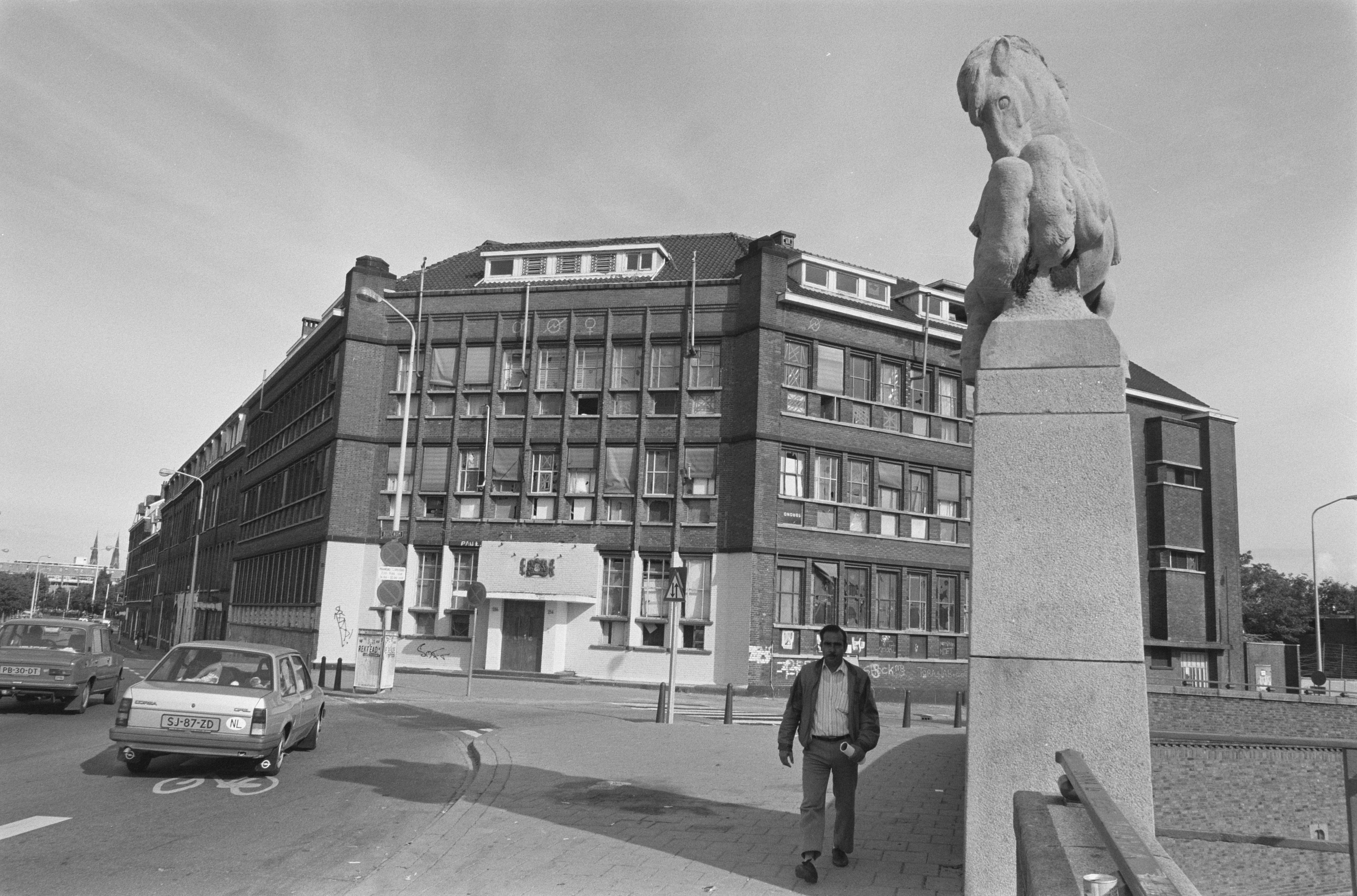
De Blauwe Aanslag in 1987

De Blauwe Aanslag was a squat and self-managed social centre in the Dutch city of The Hague. The oldest part of the building was built in 1886. The large building formerly housed tax offices and was occupied in 1980. When the local council took over the ownership of the building, it was agreed to renovate it in three stages, with the squatters living there. However the plans changed and since 1995 the council decided to widen the roads next to the building; for this reason the squat needed to be demolished. After many efforts to block the demolition with lawsuits, the squatters were evicted by military police on 3 October 2003.

== Occupation ==
With the Dutch squatters movement regularly in the news for events such as the Vondelstraat eviction resistance and the Amsterdam coronation riots, De Blauwe Aanslag was occupied in 1980. The owner, the Dutch state, tried to evict the squatters by turning off the electricity but eventually sold the building to the Hague council. At first, the council was more conciliatory in approach and in 1986 agreed with the squatters that the building should be protected. However, by the mid1990s, the council had decided that the building needed to be demolished in order to widen the road at its front, the Buitenom.

== Name ==
In English, the name De Blauwe Aanslag means 'The Blue Bill' and refers to the blue envelopes in which the Dutch tax administration sends its mail, since the building was formerly a tax office.

== Activities ==
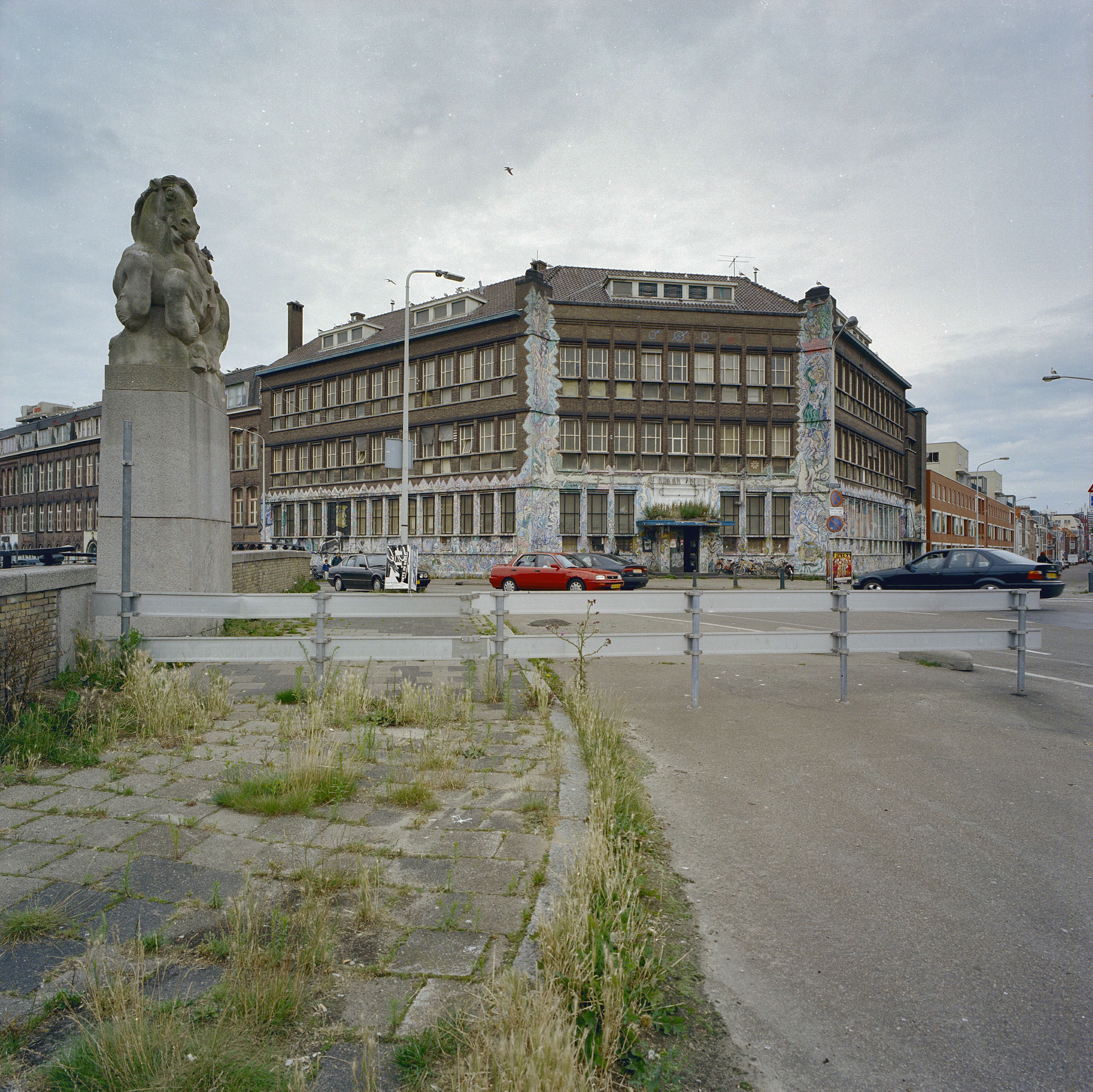
De Blauwe Aanslag in 2002

De Blauwe Aanslag housed 200 people. The building contained a cinema, a concert venue and a restaurant.

A magazine called de Schijnbeweging was published from the building. It was the first home of Radio Tonka, an ongoing free radio project. The Bunker record label came out of parties at De Blauwe Aanslag, releasing artists like Legowelt and Unit Moebius.

== Eviction ==
De Blauwe Aanslag was evicted on 3 October 2003, with an operation of 450 riot police. Ninety people were arrested.

After the final legal challenges failed when the permissions for the eviction and demolition orders were judged to be in order, two police water cannons were used to force the squatters on the roof to go back inside. Then a shipping container full of police was lifted to the roof with a crane, so that they could gain entry to the building. Later a JCB was driven into a side entrance in order to gain access at ground level.

== De Grote Pyr ==
Some inhabitants of De Blauwe Aanslag and some friends of theirs were offered the opportunity by the Hague council to buy an old school on Waldeck Pyrmontkade and renovate it. This then became De Grote Pyr.

== Recent developments ==
In 2013, ten years after De Blauwe Aanslag had been evicted and demolished, Joris Wijsmuller from the Haagse Stadspartij (a political party in the Hague) asked the council why the ground had still not been built on. He suggested it would be good to give it to the people of the Hague for new initiatives.

== See also ==
- De Vloek
- Huize Ivicke
