= Landbouwbelang (squat) =

Squatted industrial building in the Netherlands

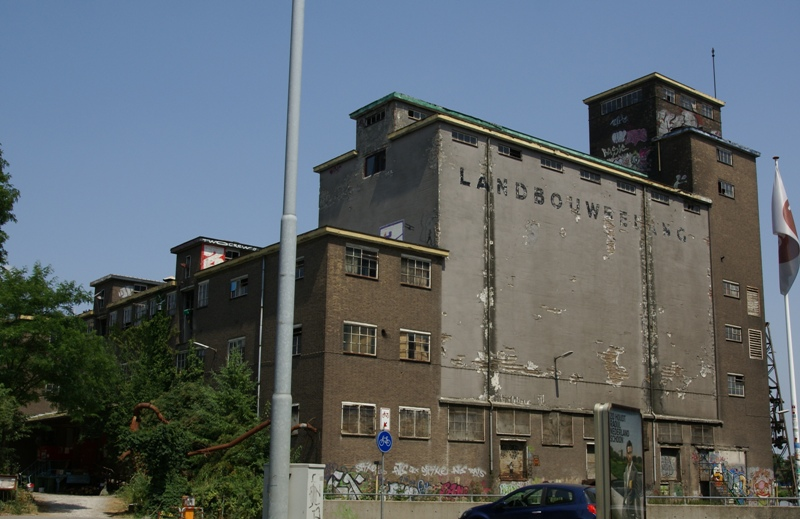
- Street view of Landbouwbelang in 2010

General information
- Architectural style: industrial
- Address: Biesenwal 3
- Town or city: Maastricht
- Country: Netherlands
- Coordinates: 50°51′19″N 5°41′40″E
- Current tenants: Cultural Freezone Landbouwbelang
- Completed: 1939
- Owner: City of Maastricht

Website
- landbouwbelang.org

The Landbouwbelang (LBB) is a squatted self-managed social centre in Maastricht, the Netherlands. It functions as a venue for cultural events and has been squatted since April 2002. It is located in the Boschstraatkwartier neighbourhood, on the bank of river Meuse (Dutch: Maas) and next to the production site of a paper manufacturer Sappi. In 2023, the city council awarded the tender for redevelopment to a consortium of businesses planning to convert the Landbouwbelang into residential apartments, student housing and new bases for the Maastricht Academy of Dramatic Arts and Maastricht Academy of Music.

== History ==
In the 13th century, a monastery of the Hospital Brothers of Saint Anthony was built on land beside the river Meuse (Dutch: Maas). It was in use until 1783, then damaged badly in the sieges of both 1793 and 1794. A large building was constructed in 1939 for processing and storing cereals by the Vereniging Landbouwbelang of Roermond. The cereal processing activities ceased in the 1970s; the building was acquired by the neighbouring paper mill and then purchased by the City of Maastricht.

The space served as a venue for community events before being squatted on 6 April 2002. Taking its name from the original owners, the Landbouwbelang self-managed social centre reported 10,000 annual visitors in 2015. People built rooms for living and the squat became an alternative cultural centre, hosting a restaurant, a yoga centre, martial arts training, dance events and a bar. Artists, designers and social entrepreneurs have working spaces at Landbouwbelang.

Despite the Dutch squatting ban, removing squatters requires an eviction court order and in order to have that granted, the owner of the building needs to present a development plan for the squatted building. According to the communications of the City of Maastricht there were currently none as of 2016.

== Proposed redevelopment ==
In 2023, the city council awarded the tender for redevelopment to a consortium of businesses planning to convert the Landbouwbelang into residential apartments, student housing and new bases for the Maastricht Academy of Dramatic Arts and Maastricht Academy of Music. The architects chosen were Tuñon and Albornoz of Madrid. The squatters did not support the new plans. Discussions concerning the squatters moving to the Timmerfabriek were objected to by the People's Party for Freedom and Democracy (VVD) in 2025.

== See also ==
- ADM
- ACU
- Grote Broek
