= Fort Pannerden =

Disused military fort near Pannerden, Netherlands

Coordinates: 51°52′51″N 6°1′38″E

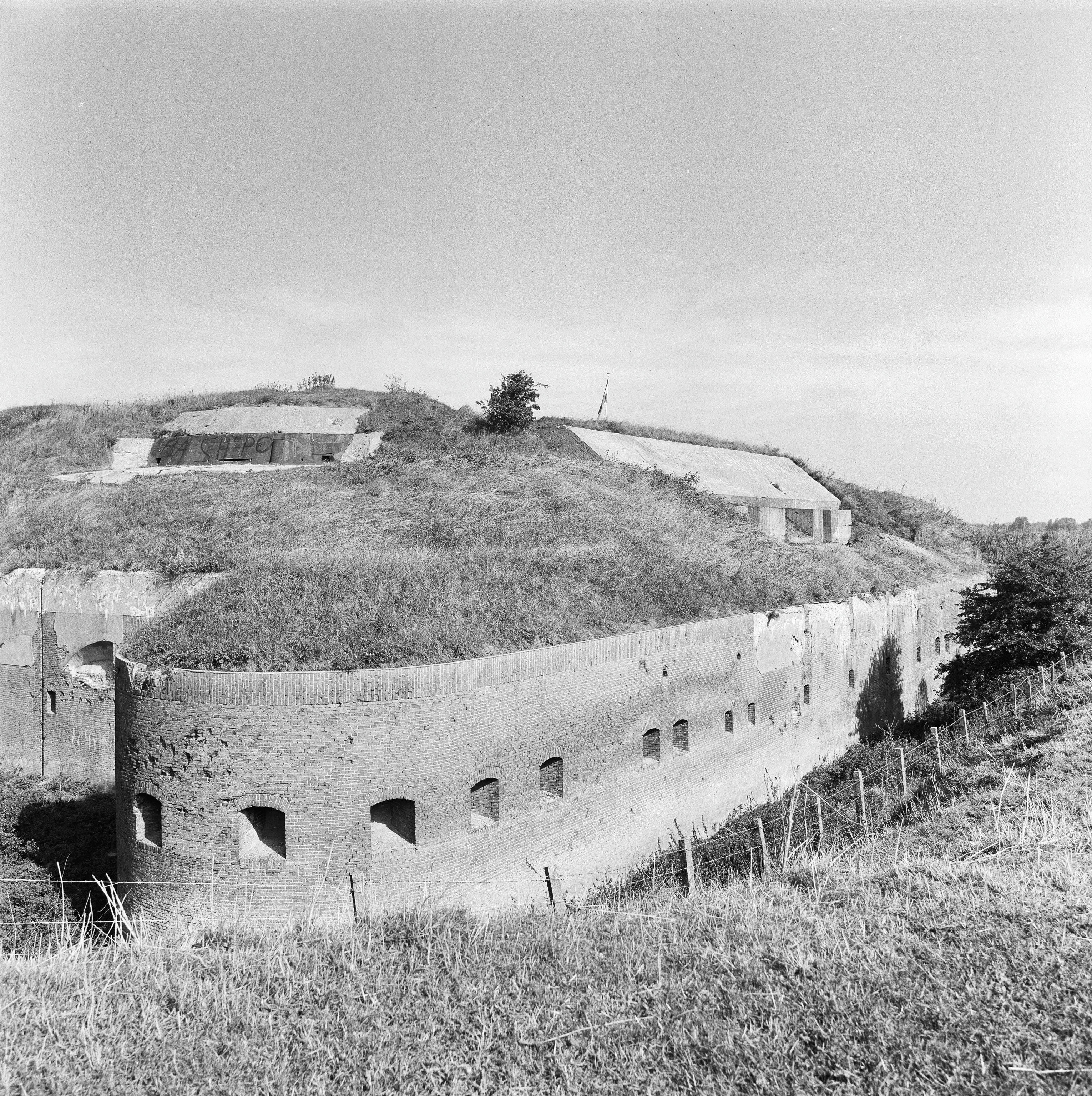
Fort Pannerden in 1990

Fort Pannerden is a disused military fort situated near the village of Pannerden in the southeast of the Netherlands. In November 2006, it became the focus of national news stories because a group of squatters were evicted in a large-scale operation by police, helped by the army. Later on in the same month, it was resquatted.

== History ==
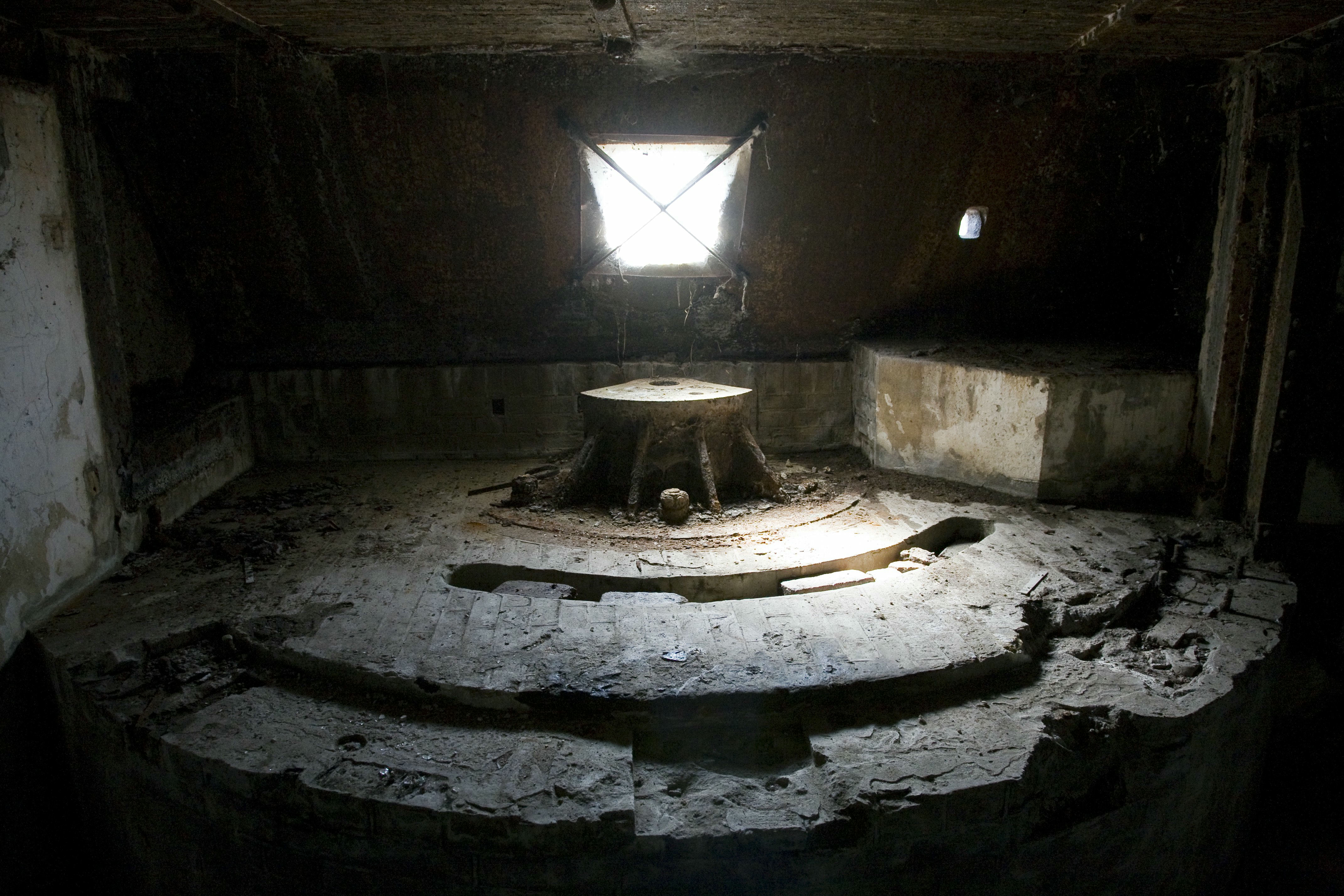
Remains of a gun carriage

The fort was constructed between 1869 and 1871 to serve as part of the New Dutch Waterline. Originally built completely out of brick and mortar, with just one main battery guarding the Rhine, it was upgraded significantly during 1885–1895. The main battery was completely rebuilt, with armour and concrete, while two additional armoured batteries were added and the roof of the fort was reinforced with concrete. The fort had strategic significance in that it guarded the Pannerden Canal, which supplied the water for the inundations of the New Dutch Waterline and could potentially be used as a route towards the main line of defence, but the fort saw little active service. In World War I the Netherlands remained neutral, although the fort was manned as part of a general mobilisation. In World War II on May 10, 1940, during the German invasion of the Netherlands, the fort was first bypassed and then surrounded. On May 11, cut off from the rest of the Dutch army, the commander of the fort surrendered under threat of artillery bombardment and air attack. Most of the fort was subsequently stripped of all useful materials and after 1945 the building fell into disuse.

== Recent history ==
From 1988 onwards, there have been attempts to repair the fort, but during the 1990s those plans fell through and all work was abandoned. On June 12, 2000, the fort was squatted. Working with local residents and Stichting Fort Pannerden (a foundation set up to maintain and promote the fort), the squatters carried out essential repairs and held a monthly open day. The local city council (gemeente Lingewaard) forbade the open days and the owner, Staatsbosbeheer, took the squatters to court, saying it wanted to make a museum there. The owner won the court case. After the squatters refused to leave, they were evicted in a two-day operation by police, riot police and army forces beginning November 7, 2006. Twenty five squatters were removed from inside the building.

On November 25, 2006, the fort was resquatted by a group of between eighty and one hundred squatters. After first threatening to evict the fort again despite the huge costs involved, the council signed a contract in December with the squatters. The squatters agreed not to live there, but four out of the group were now responsible for the upkeep of the building. The open days were once more permitted, until they left when work to restore the fort began in 2009.
