= Huize Ivicke =

Monumental building in Wassenaar

Coordinates: 52°07′30″N 4°23′12″E

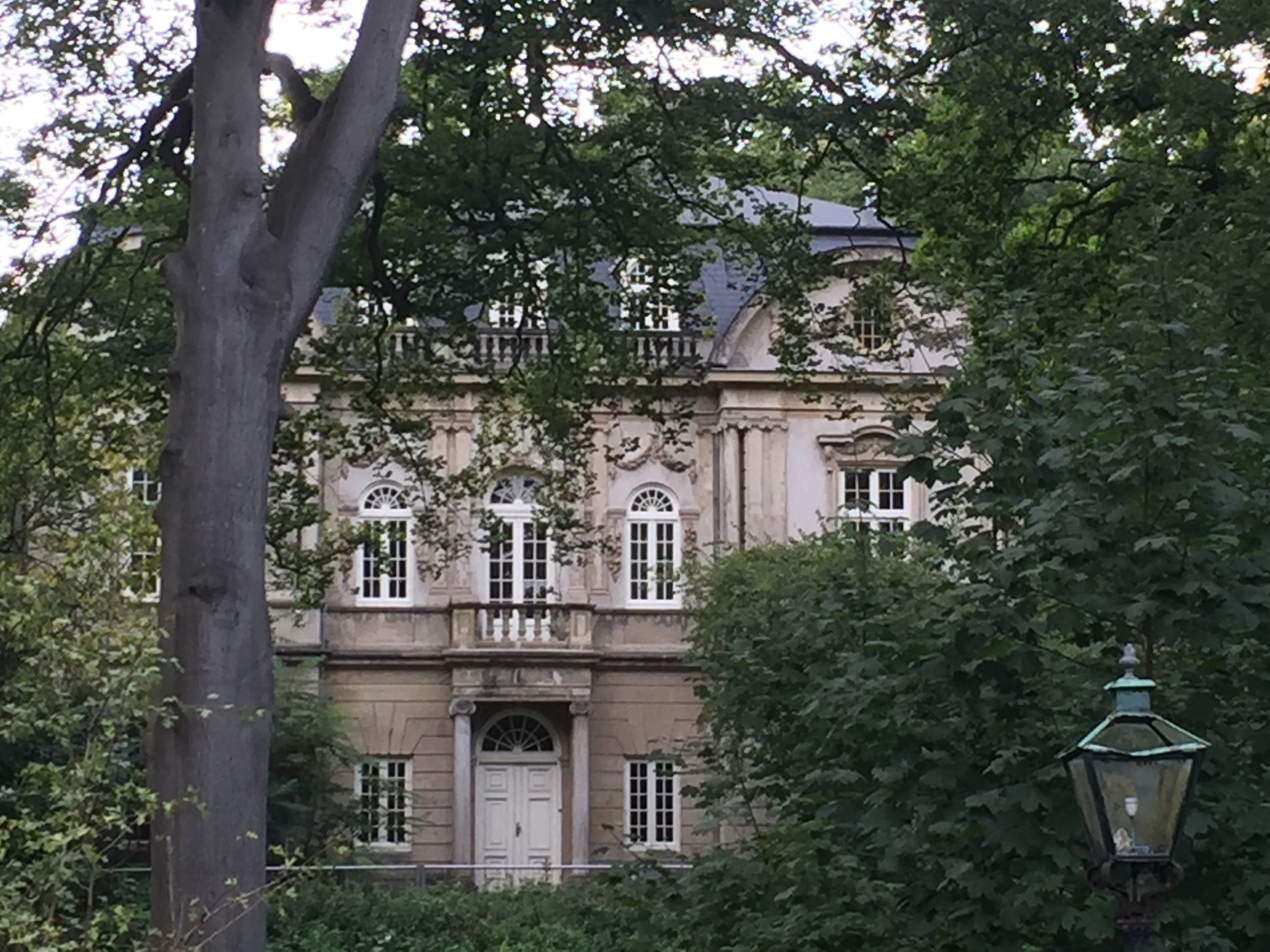
Ivicke House in 2023

Huize Ivicke is a monumental building in Wassenaar, the Netherlands. Constructed in 1913 for A. F. J. van Hattum, it is a replica of the Eremitageslottet hunting lodge in the Jaegersborg Dyrehave in Denmark. It was inhabited until the mid-1980s, when it became offices. Since 2000, it has been owned by speculator Ronnie van de Putte, known as the "Slum King of the Netherlands" (Krottenkoning van Nederland). He refuses to renovate the building, despite its monumental status. Heritage groups warned the local municipality in the late 2010s that the villa was severely dilapidated and it was placed on a list of the fourteen most threatened monuments in Europe. It is currently the subject of an intense dispute over emergency renovations and was squatted in 2018, by people wanting to carry out essential repairs. The house, the formal garden, the gate and the playhouse are all national monuments.

== History ==
Huize Ivicke stands at Rust en Vreugdlaan 2, adjacent to the Rijksstraatweg (N44) which runs between The Hague and Wassenaar. It was constructed in 1913 by architect G. J. van der Mark. The owner was A. F. J. van Hattum, who bought the plot from Princess Marie of the Netherlands and planned to give the villa to his Danish wife Xenia Maria Pousette as a present. The house is a replica of the Eremitageslottet hunting lodge which was used by Danish royalty in the Jægersborg Dyrehave park near to Copenhagen. Huize Ivicke is a national monument (rijksmonument), as are the wooden playhouse constructed behind it for the couple's children, the ornate metal gate and the formal garden.

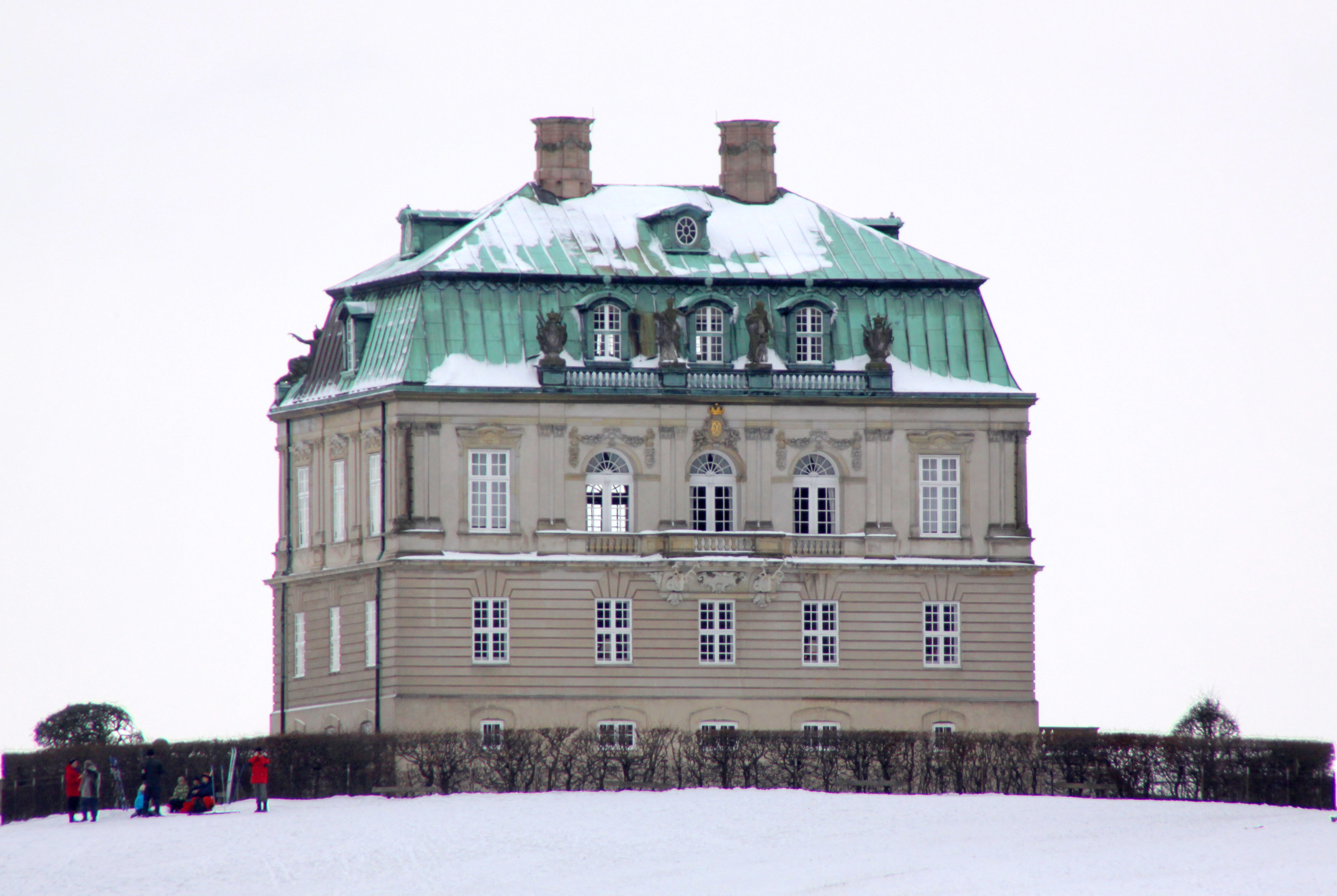
Huize Ivicke is a replica of the Eremitageslottet in Denmark, pictured here in 2010

Pousette died in the house at the age of 33, in 1922. Van Hattum remarried with Leoni Hubertina Anna Maria van Zweden and himself died in 1961. Van Zweden then sold the house to the wife of Paul Huet, a banker, and the Huets were the last people to live in Huize Ivicke. By the mid-1980s, it had been converted into office space. Huize Ivicke was sold in 2000 to Muntendamsche Investerings Maatschappij, which is run by Bever Holding.

== Decline ==
In 2017, two groups dedicated to protecting monumental buildings sounded the alarm because Huize Ivicke was becoming dangerously dilapidated. Stichting het Cuypersgenootschap and Erfgoedvereniging Heemschut asked the local municipality to write to Bever Holding, a real estate company which is notorious for allowing properties to decay, to ensure that the building was protected against rain damage and would not experience further destruction. Heemschut later nominated the building as one of the fourteen most threatened heritage monuments in Europe. After being listed as one of the fourteen, it was then proposed by Europa Nostra as one of the seven most endangered monuments in 2020. It was not listed and a representative of Heemschut commented "It's a shame of course but we understand the choice of the buildings that are on the list".

== Dispute ==
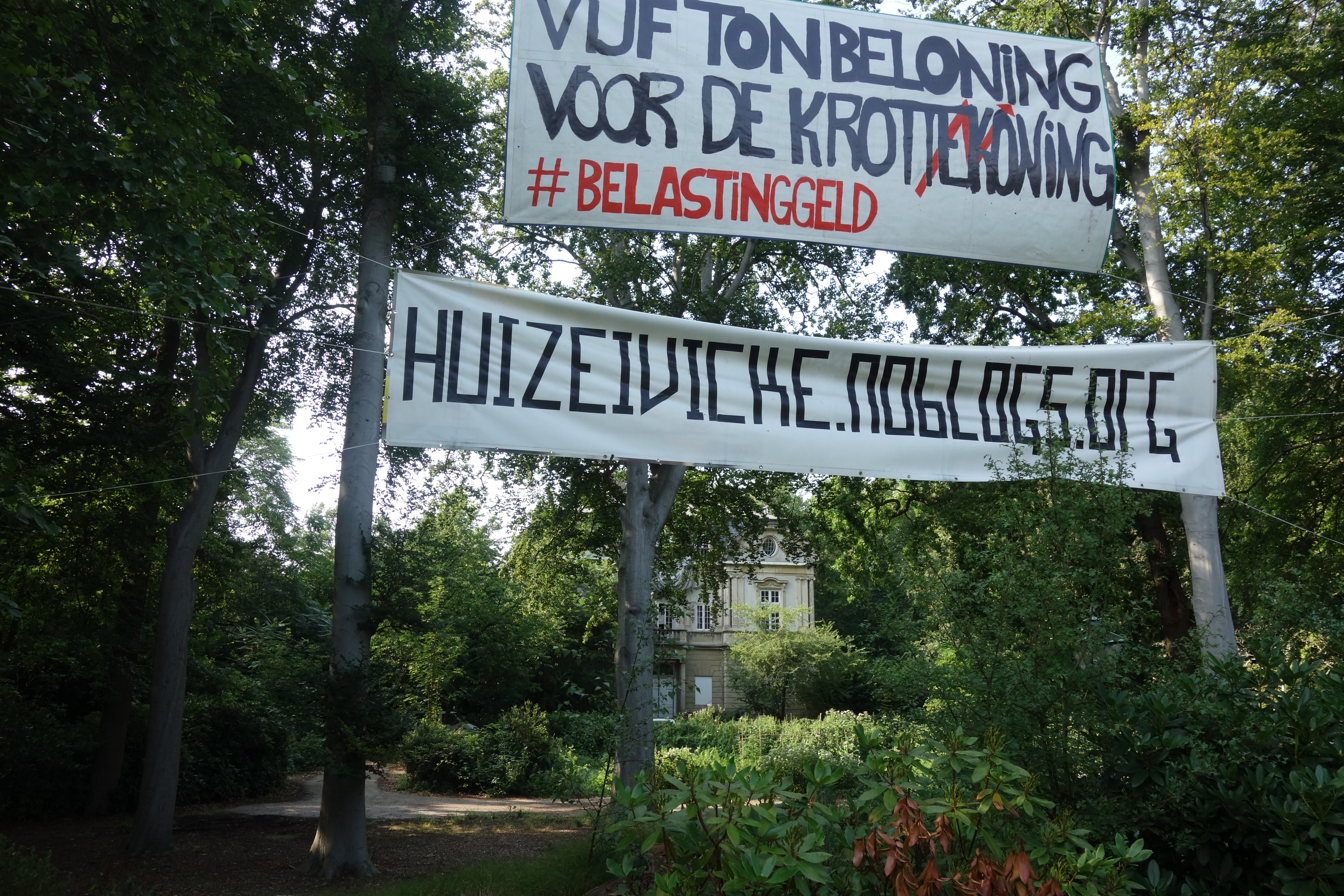
Huize Ivicke, protests (2020)

The major shareholder in Bever Holding is Ronnie van de Putte, a well-known speculator and real estate investor who is known as the "Slum King of the Netherlands" (Krottenkoning van Nederland), as a result of his policy of buying buildings then leaving them to decay or even demolishing them and decades later selling the land parcel for a profit. The municipality of Noordwijk issued a fine of 200,000 euros to the company for not restoring two buildings, a restaurant called De Vuurtoren and a villa called De Vier Winden. After being fined, Bever demolished both places. In Leiden, Bever had for years owned a plot of land with two buildings on it next to the central train station. One building was demolished in 1993 and the entire site stood derelict until 2010, when the municipality paid Bever 17.9 million euros for the plot, having failed to expropriate it. Van de Putte also bought a monumental former school called Het Hoompje in Sluis, which he has left empty since 1992. He is able to do this because local councils only have limited rights to interfere with a privately owned building.

Huize Ivicke was occupied by squatters in July 2018, who were willing to carry out emergency repairs on the building to prevent water damage. The squatters stated that they were doing what the owner should have already been doing. In Dutch squatting culture it is common for buildings to be occupied in order to preserve them. Most squatting actions are to provide housing, but buildings are also occupied for political or entrepreneurial reasons.

The local municipality ordered Ronnie van de Putte to repair the building in November 2019 and required him to make it wind- and waterproof within a month. Since he did not do that, a contractor was employed by the municipality in January 2020. According to the squatters, the contractor did a shoddy job, simply nailing plastic sheets to the leaking dormer windows and even creating new problems. The following month, van de Putte had still not begun the essential works, claiming that he was unable to do so because the building was squatted. The municipality did not agree with him. Since van de Putte has never applied for any permissions or permits, it is unlikely a judge would evict the squatters since there is no reason to do so under Dutch law. In January, the building had been sold twice with van de Putte ending up as the owner. The municipality was concerned that by these manoeuvres van de Putte was attempting to evade paying for the necessary renovations.

By March 2020, the province of South Holland had offered to help fund the renovation costs, which it estimated to be around 500,000 euros. The municipality was still struggling to make van de Putte pay for the restoration himself and the province said if that was not possible it would make a contribution. The squatters stated "we stand against this abuse of public funds for a project that does not meet the criteria set by Zuid-Holland's own monument restoration policy, where there is no guarantee the money could be recouped, and which does not guard against a new cycle of neglect and decay". The squatters were eventually evicted in September 2022.

== See also ==
- Marlborough House, Brighton
- Squat Milada
