= Dutch squatting ban =

The Dutch squatting ban refers to the law (Dutch: Wet Kraken en Leegstand) introduced on 1 October 2010, under which squatting in the Netherlands became de jure illegal. Criminalization had first been proposed in the 1970s, but was opposed by the Council of Churches. In 2006, a new plan was proposed and backed by parties including VVD and PVV. When the new law was introduced, squatters occupied the former head office of the fire brigade and there were riots in Amsterdam and Nijmegen. In 2011, the Supreme Court of the Netherlands ruled that the legally forced end of squatting can only occur after an intervention of a judge. Between October 2010 and December 2014, 529 people were arrested for the act of occupying derelict buildings, in 213 separate incidents as a result of which 39 people were jailed.

== History ==
Squatting ban sign

In 1978, the Council of Churches launched a protest which scotched a proposal to criminalise squatting.

In June 2006, ministers Sybilla Dekker and Piet Hein Donner from the Dutch government proposed a plan to criminalise squatting. Other ministers, such as Alexander Pechtold, were not in favour. Representatives of the four largest Dutch cities wrote a letter stating that it would not be in their interests to proceed with a ban. Squatters nationwide made banners, hanging them on their squats in protest.

== Criminalization ==
Several parties, notably the VVD party, were vocal critics of squatting. Backed by the leader of the PVV, Geert Wilders, they moved to outlaw squatting. The new squatting ban was passed by the House of Representatives on 15 October 2009 and the Senate on 1 June 2010, and became law on 1 October 2010. The penalty is one year's imprisonment or more, if violence is involved. Mayor of Amsterdam Eberhard van der Laan, and police commissioner Leen Schaap stated their joint intention to clear roughly 200 of 300 squats in Amsterdam, and to treat squatting as a criminal offence. There were estimated to be 1,500 squatters in Amsterdam. Sociologist E.T.C. Dee observes that there was a moral panic generated in the Dutch media regarding three accusations made by the police concerning booby traps and weapons caches in the squats of Amsterdam. Thus the squatters' movement was seen as increasingly violent and needing to be regulated.

== Reactions ==
Squatting became a criminal offence at midnight on 1 October 2010, passing from the civil courts to the criminal courts. In Amsterdam, squatters had previously occupied the former headquarters of the Dutch fire brigade in protest. In a press release, the squatters announced on 30 September that they would be handing the building at 99 Weesperzijde over to tenants arranged by the landlord. On the last weekend in September, squatters had camped out on the Dam Square overnight as a protest.

On the day itself, there was a demonstration in Amsterdam numbering 100–300 people by various estimates. As evening came, a riot began. The police charged the demonstration and protesters responded by throwing stones and vandalising cars. The police used tear gas and eleven squatters were arrested. Two police officers and three police horses were injured. Protesters built ad hoc street barricades from metal fences and bicycles. There was also a riot in Nijmegen.

== Post-criminalization ==
On 28 October 2011, the Supreme Court of the Netherlands decided that the legally forced end of squatting can only occur after an intervention of a judge. The Dutch government assessed the effectiveness of the new law in 2015, releasing a report giving statistics on arrests and convictions between October 2010 and December 2014. During this time period, 529 people have been arrested for the act of occupying derelict buildings in 213 separate incidents. Of the 529 arrests, 210 were found guilty. Of those convicted, 39 people were imprisoned for the new offence.

The mayor of Amsterdam, Femke Halsema called for stricter treatment of squatters in 2019. That year in Amsterdam, 74 squats had been officially recorded, of which 67 had been evicted. Squatters marked the ten year anniversary of the squatting ban on 1 October 2020 in a national campaign placing banners and posters on long-term empty places. In Utrecht, a banner was hung at a building on Burgemeester Reigerstraat where residents had been evicted in 2019.
