= Squatting in Spain =

Occupation of unused land or derelict buildings in Spain

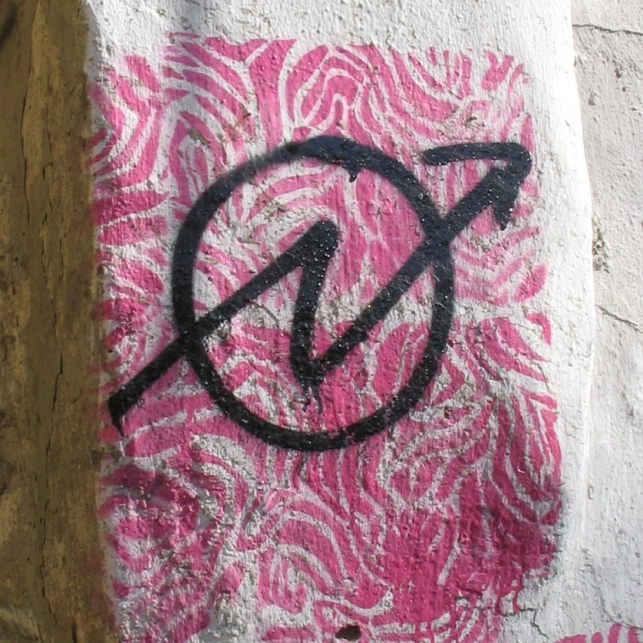
Squatter's symbol found in Málaga, Spain

Squatting in Spain refers to the occupation of unused or derelict buildings or land without the permission of the owner. In Francoist Spain migrant workers lived in slums on the periphery of cities. During the Spanish transition to democracy, residential squatting occurred in Spanish cities such as Barcelona, Bilbao, Madrid, Valencia and Zaragoza. From the 1980s onwards a new generation of squatters set up self-managed social centres which hosted events and campaigns. The 1995 Criminal Code among other things criminalised squatting, but failed to stop it. Social centres exist across the country and in Barcelona and Madrid in particular. In the Basque Country they are known as gaztetxes.

== Overview ==
Francoist Spain ended with the death of Francisco Franco in 1975. In the following year, the numbers of people striking increased from 500,000 to over 5 million and social movements blossomed. During the Spanish transition to democracy, residential squatting occurred in cities such as Barcelona, Bilbao, Madrid, Valencia and Zaragoza.

In the 1970s, there were self-built informal settlements or slums as new industrialised zones in cities drew working class migrants from rural areas. A contemporary slum is Cañada Real, where an estimated 40,000 to 50,000 people live along a 15km track formerly used as a drovers' road, on the boundary shared by Madrid and Rivas Vaciamadrid. Parts of the slum are notorious for drug-dealing. Since it is deemed public land, the squatters are unable to gain possession by usucapión (adverse possession).

As of 2017, it took on average eight months for owners to regain properties from squatters. A company called Desokupa ("De-Squat") became notorious for evicting squatters without a legal process, for example La Yaya social centre in Argüelles, Madrid. El Mundo stated in 2018 that there had been over 12,000 reported squats in that year, up from 7,739 in 2013. Barcelona had the most reported squats, with 17,465 reported between 2013 and 2018. During the COVID-19 pandemic in Spain, around 600 Roma people squatted properties on the Costa del Sol which had been impounded as part of Operation Malaya.

== Okupa ==
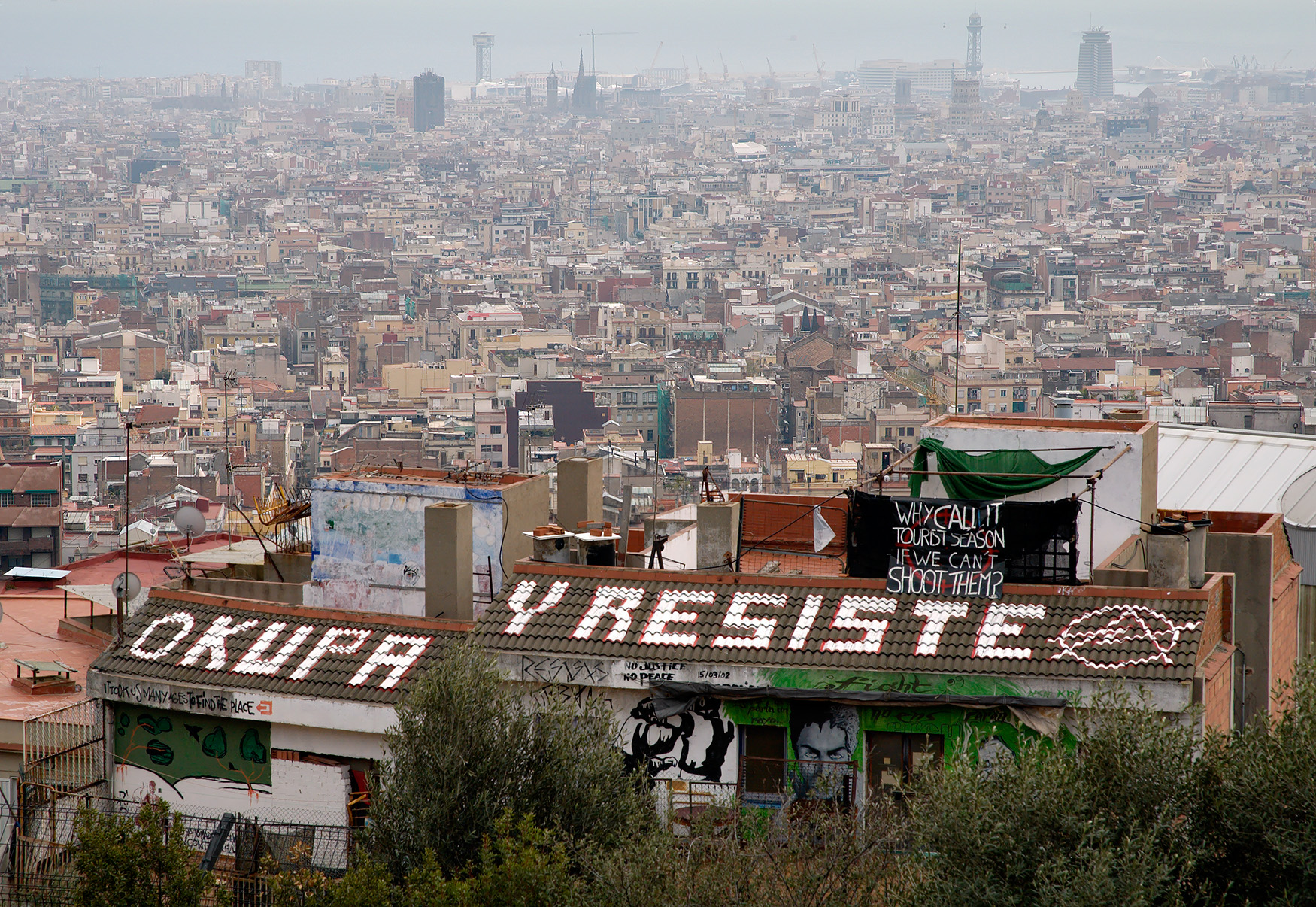
Bloques Fantasmas squat seen from Parc Güell, overlooking Barcelona

Young people were attracted to the new 1980s squatting movement and began to set up self-managed social centres, known as CSOAs (Centros Sociales Okupados y Autogestionados), which hosted infoshops and co-operatives, organised events and provided meeting space for campaigns. The word okupa is derived from the Spanish verb "ocupar", meaning to occupy. The letter "k" is seldom used in Spanish, so squatter activists used it to signify their radicality and their difference to mainstream culture. The social centres has their antecedents in libertarian ateneus, countercultural spaces which were founded in many cities from the late 1970s onwards. The 1995 Criminal Code among other things criminalised squatting but it did not stop the squatters movement from growing.

In Madrid, a key project in the 1980s was Minuesa. Eskalera Karakola was a feminist squat, which was active from 1996 to 2005 before legalizing and taking a new building. The squatter movement experienced a resurgence in the early 2010s as a result of the anti-austerity 15-M Movement. As of 2013, there were over thirty squatted social centres in Madrid. Patio Maravillas was active from 2007 until 2015 in several different buildings. La Ingobernable was evicted in 2020 during the state of alarm due to the COVID-19 pandemic in Spain.

The number of squatted social centres in Barcelona grew from under thirty in the 1990s to around sixty in 2014, as recorded by Info Usurpa (a weekly activist agenda). The influential Kasa de la Muntanya was occupied in 1989. In 2014, the ultimately unsuccessful attempts to evict the long-running social centre of Can Vies provoked major riots. Another long-running squat is Can Masdeu, which survived a concerted eviction attempt in 2002. Eleven occupiers suspended themselves off the walls of the building for several days.

The Basque Country is another area where a high number of houses have been occupied and social centres take the form of gaztetxes. Influential projects in the 1980s included Bolsa de Bilbao, Gaztetxe de Gazteiz in Vitoria-Gasteiz and Euskal Jai in Pamplona. The eviction of Kukutza in Bilbao was met with largescale protests in 2011. On the outskirts of Vitoria-Gasteiz, the squatted neighbourhood of Errekaleor was occupied in 2013 and has around 150 inhabitants.

== Gallery ==
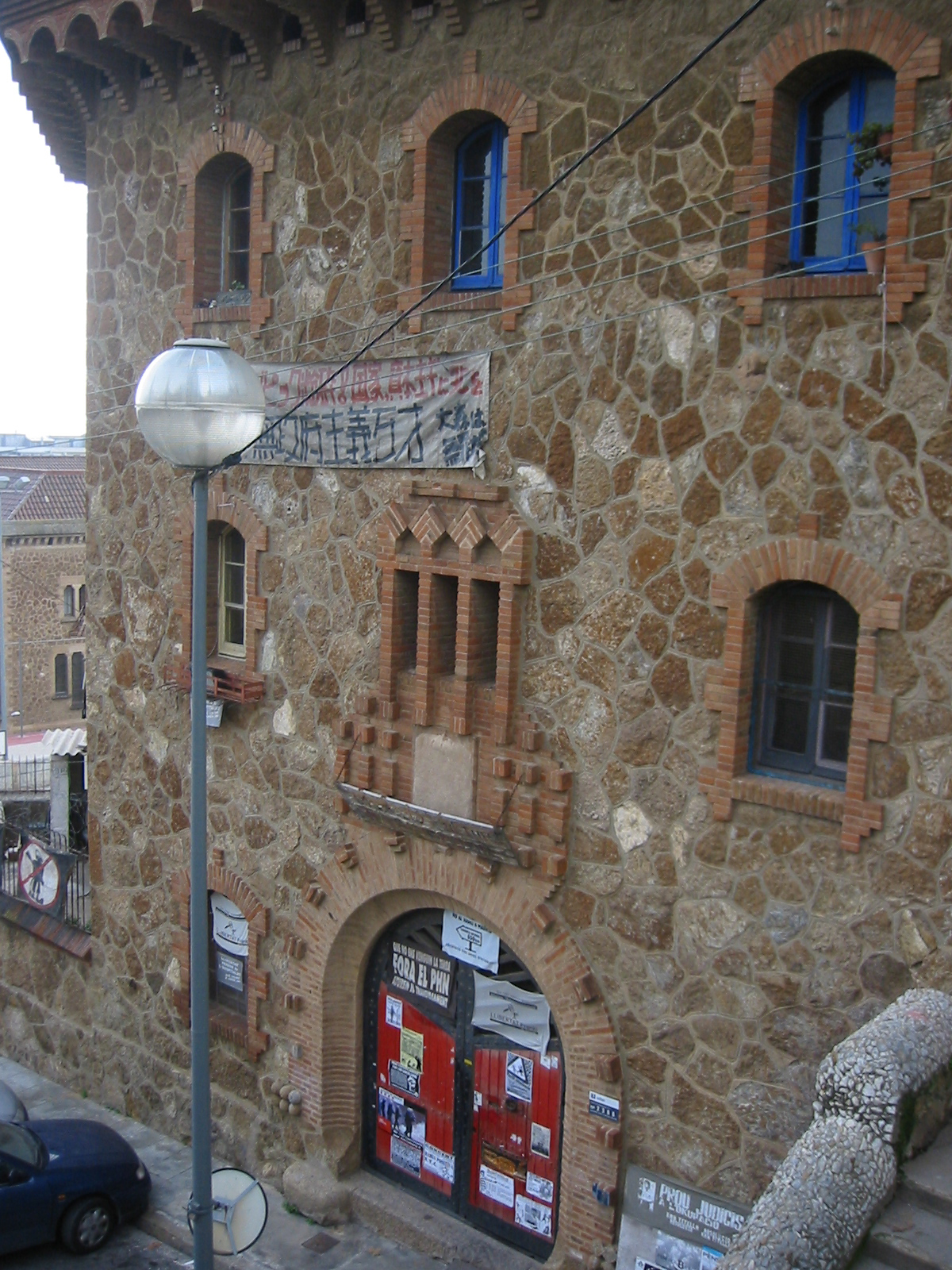
Kasa de la Muntanya, Barcelona-Vallcarca (2006)

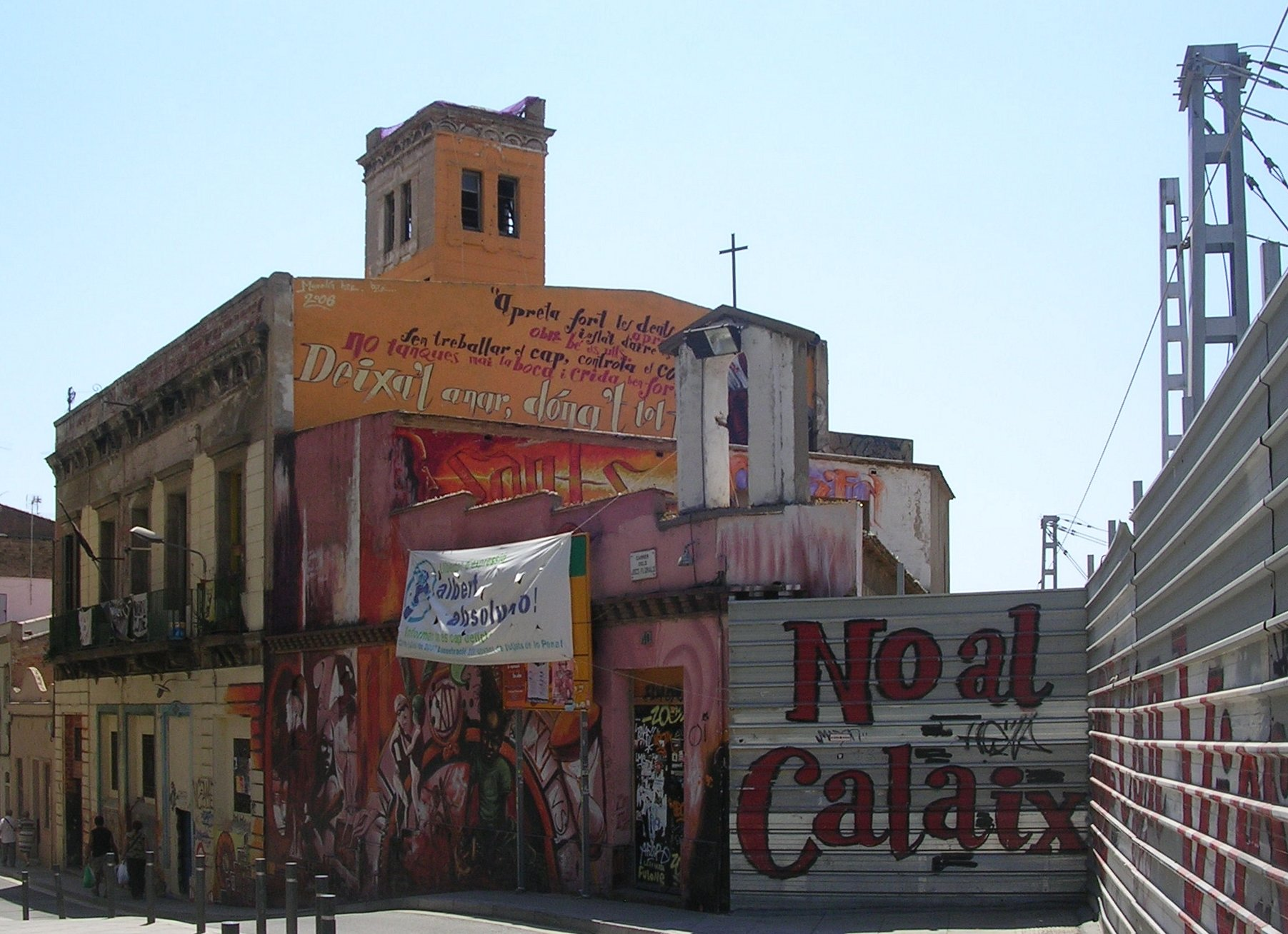
C.S.A. Can Vies, Barcelona-Sants (2007)

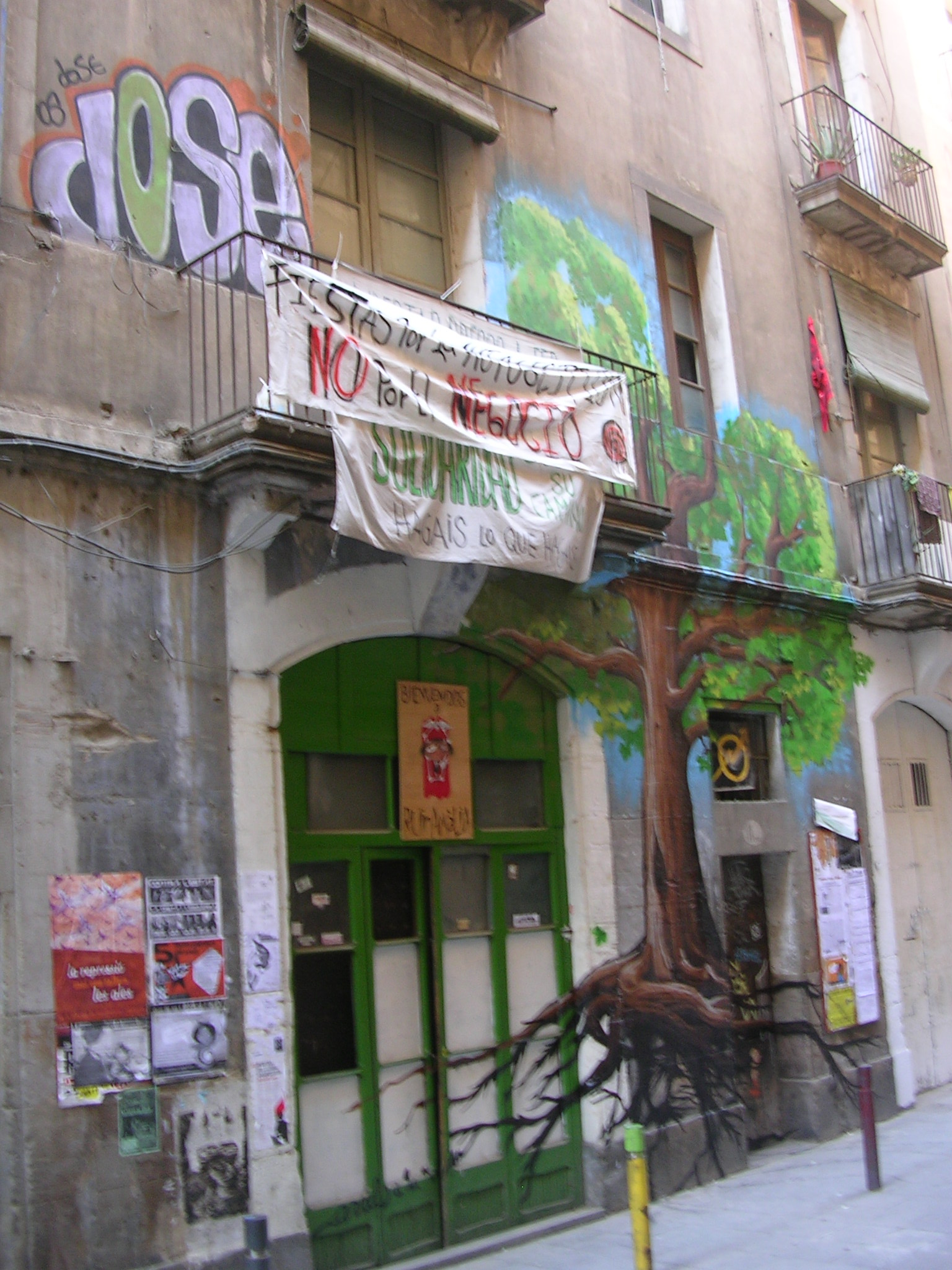
Ruïna Amàlia, Barcelona (2007)

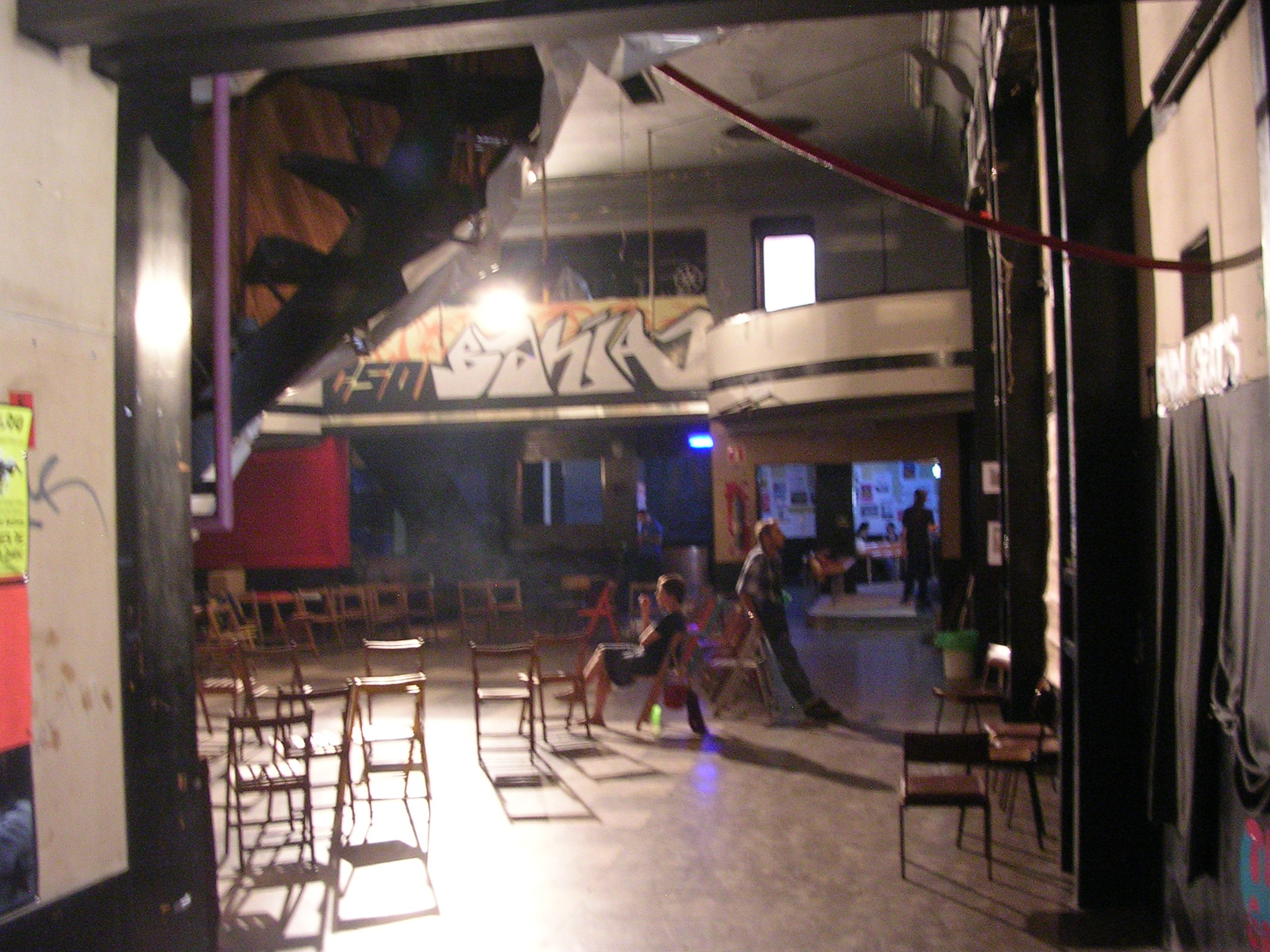
Interior of Bahía, Barcelona-Sants (2007)

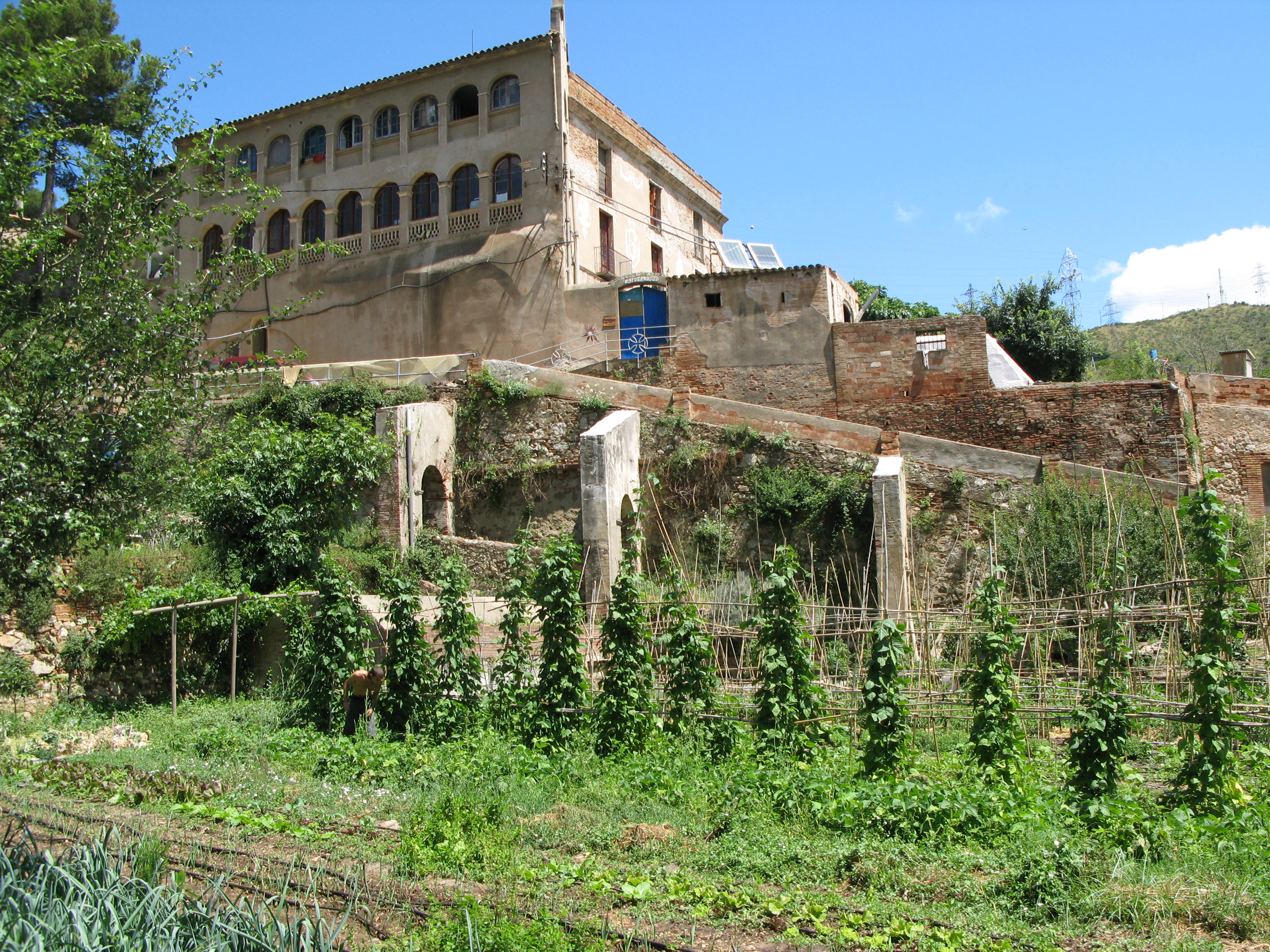
Can Masdeu, Barcelona-Collserola (2009)

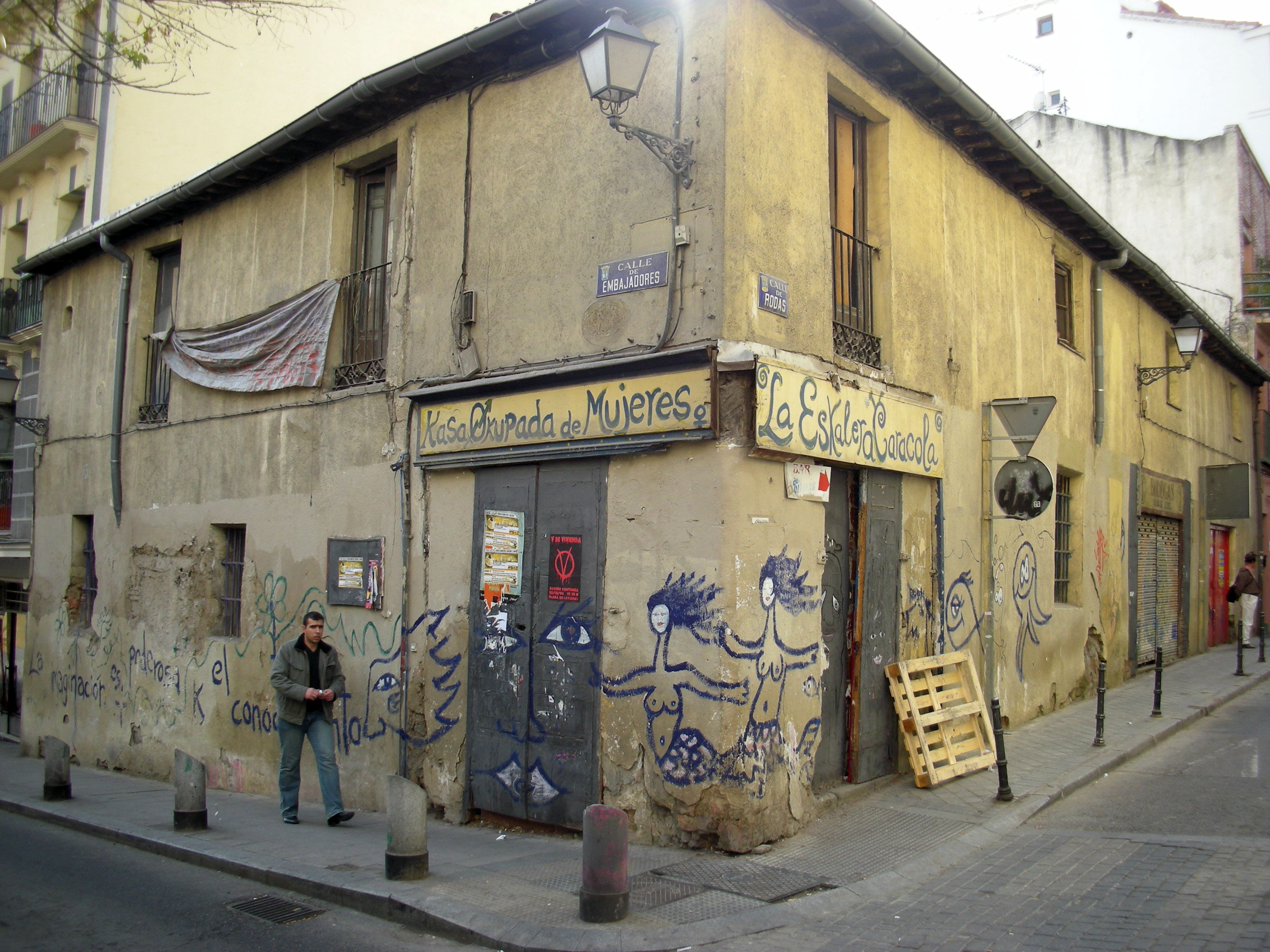
The former building of Eskalera Karakola, feminist squat in Madrid (2007)

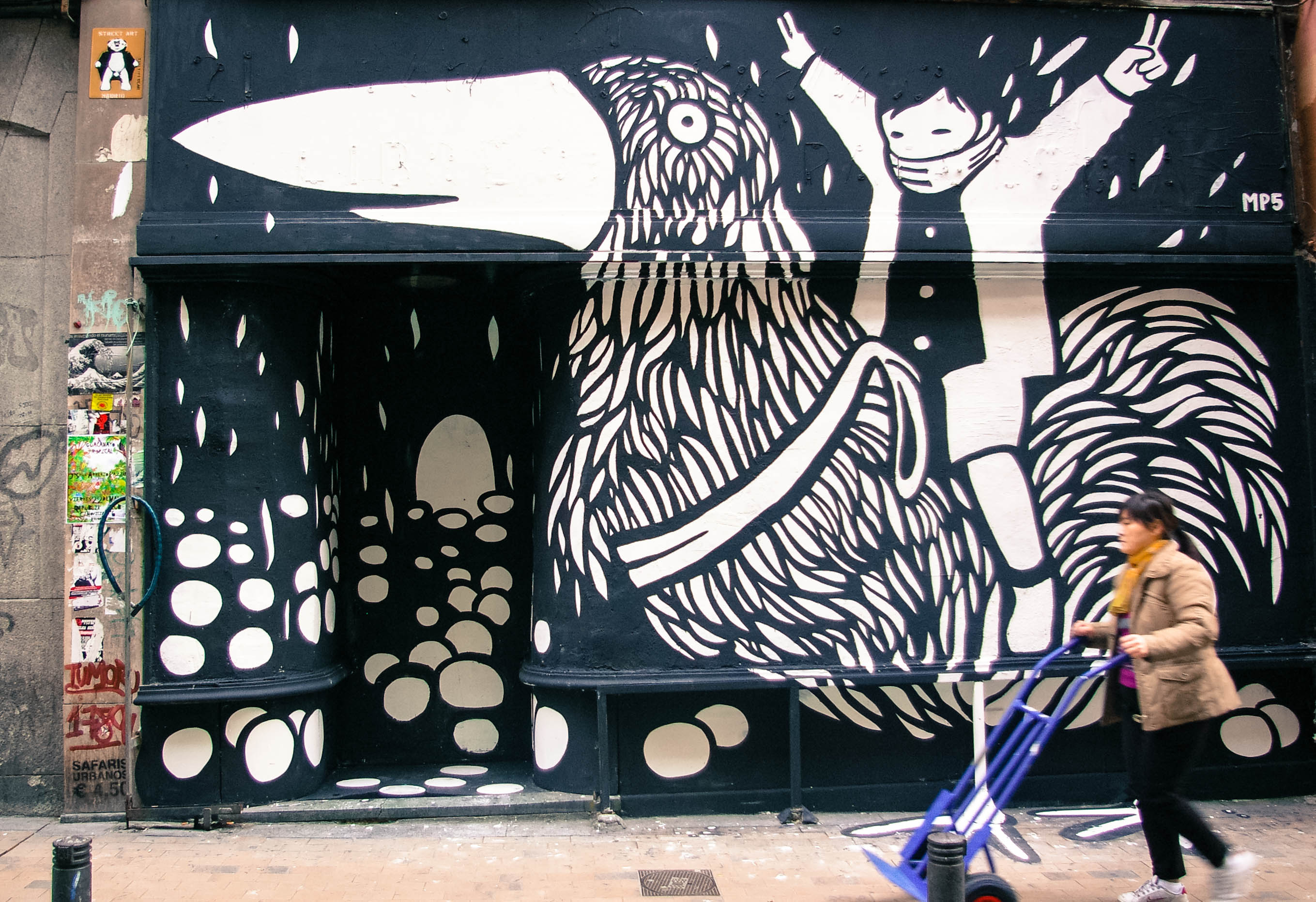
Mural on exterior of Patio Maravillas (2013)

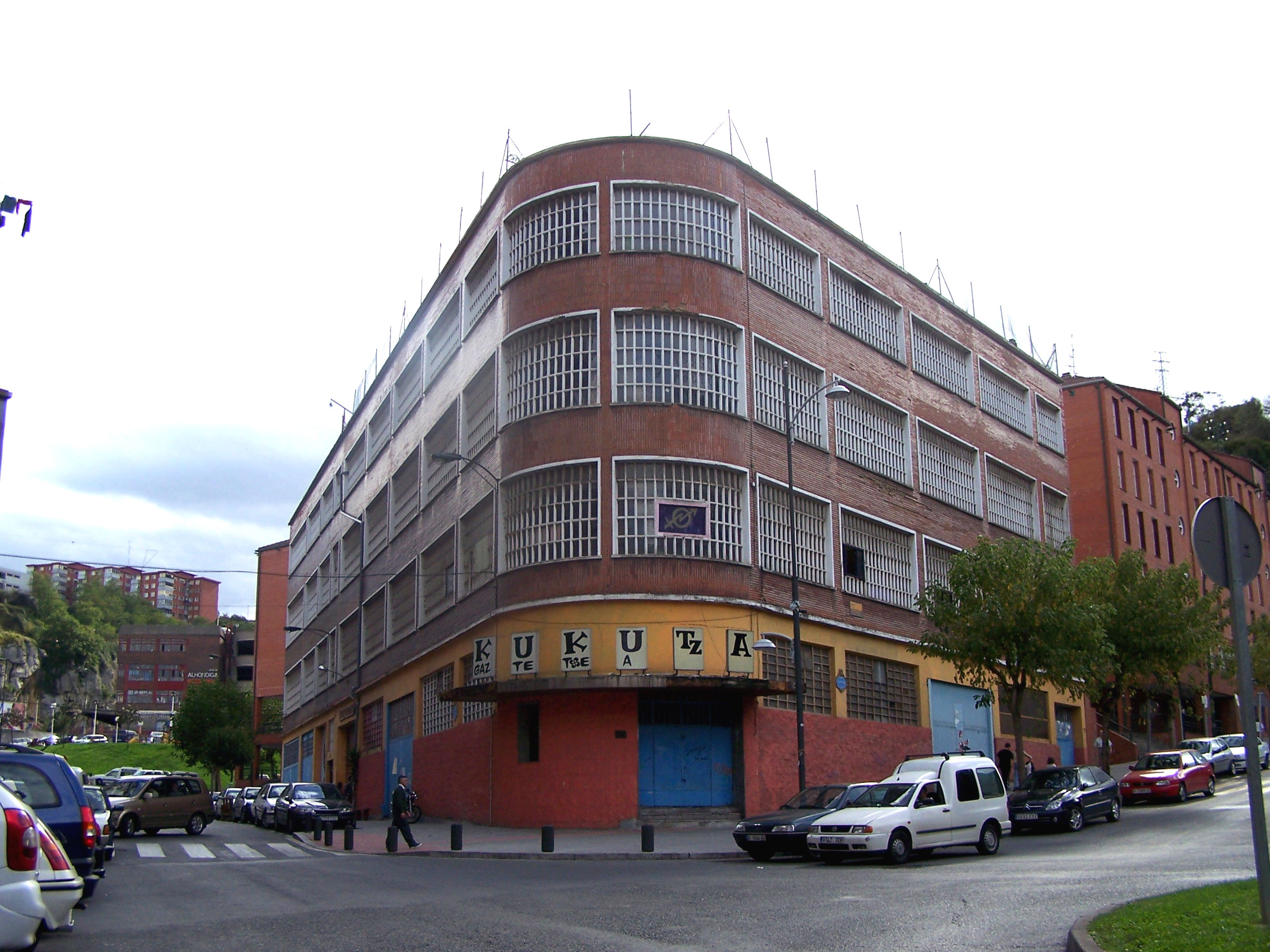
Kukutza III, Errekalde, Bilbao (2005)

== Housing movement ==
As a result of the Great Recession in the late 2000s, over 50% of young people aged between 16 and 34 were still living with their parents in 2011, since they were unable to afford to buy or rent. Despite the cost of renting being at relatively high level, the number of empty properties rocketed to 3.5 million out of a total of 35 million, again in 2011. Many people lost their houses due to foreclosure, over 600,000 between 2008 and 2014. This situation led to the foundation of the Plataforma de Afectados por la Hipoteca (PAH) (Platform for People Affected by Mortgages) in Barcelona in 2009. By 2018, there were 78 PAH groups in Catalonia and 245 in total in Spain. The PAH used a variety of tactics to support tenants under threat of eviction, including street protests against banks and legal challenges. Between 2009 and 2017, it prevented 2045 evictions and rehoused over 2500 people by squatting properties owned by banks. The PAH has points of agreement with the okupa movement and is also seen as reformist, since its leaders moved towards local government. For example, Ada Colau was a regional leader of the PAH in Barcelona and then became mayor, representing the party Barcelona en Comú ("Barcelona in common"). The PAH uses the more conventional spelling of "ocupa" instead of "okupa" for a squat.

== See also ==
- 4F case
- Anarchism in Spain
- Plataforma de Afectados por la Hipoteca
- Self-managed social centres in Italy
