= Ingobernable (disambiguation) =

Ingobernable is a Mexican political web television series.

Ingobernable may also refer to:

- La Ingobernable, a series of self-managed social centres in Madrid, Spain
- Los Ingobernables, a Mexican professional wrestling stable
- Los Ingobernables de Japón, a Japanese professional wrestling stable
