= Kasa de la Muntanya =

Squatted police station in Barcelona

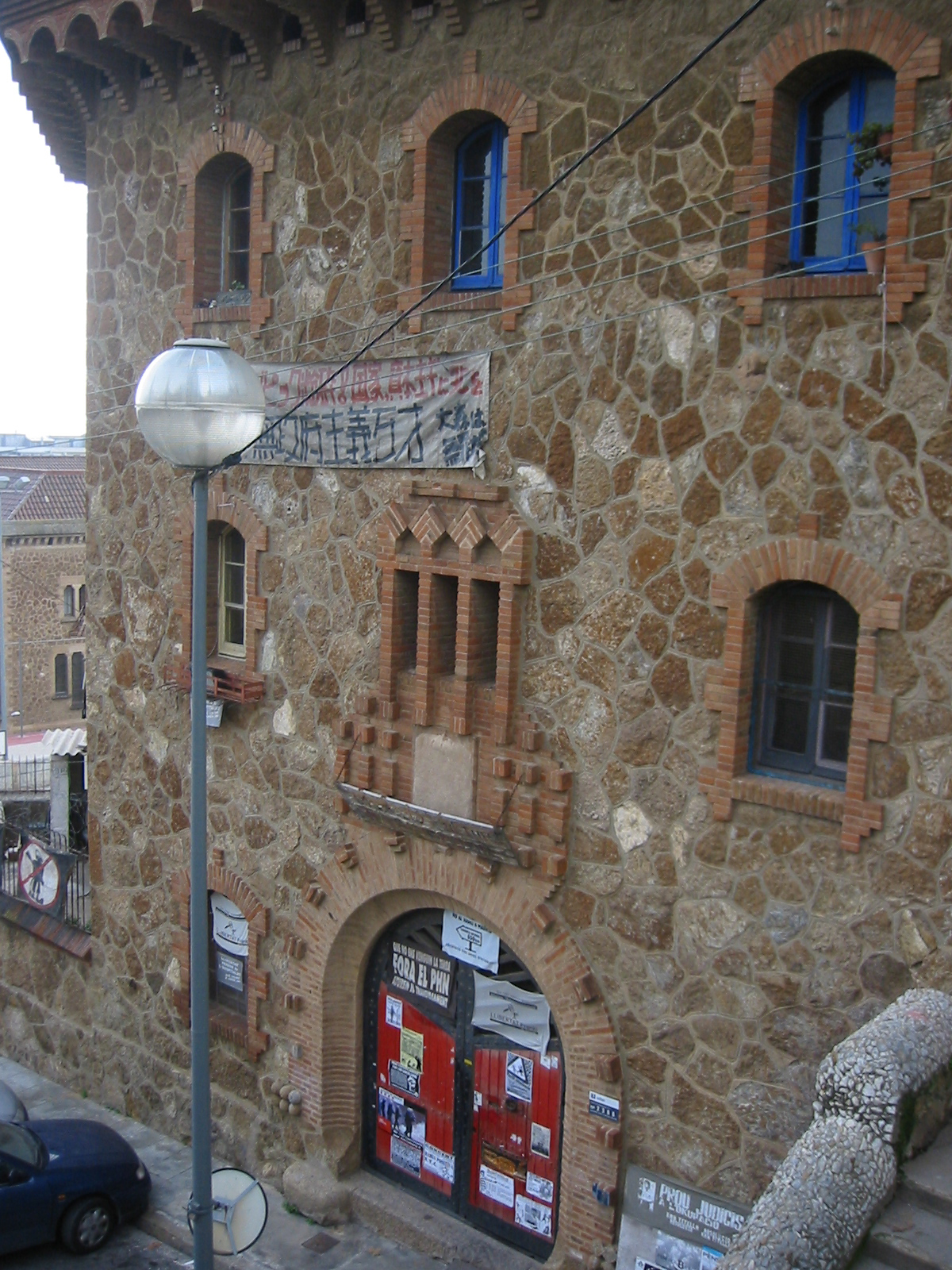
- 2006
- Interactive map of Kasa de la Muntanya

General information
- Location: Avinguda Santuari Sant Josep de la Muntanya, 31, Barcelona
- Coordinates: 41°24′41″N 2°09′12″E
- Completed: 1909
- Opened: 1989 (squatted)
- Owner: Güell family

Technical details
- Size: 745m²

Kasa de la Muntanya is a squatted former Guardia Civil (Civil Guard) barracks in Barcelona. It was built in 1909, by Eusebi Güell, abandoned by the police in 1983, and occupied in 1989. It became central to the squatter movement in Barcelona as a self-managed social centre. The Güell family undertook a long legal battle to regain ownership of the building and then started negotiations with the city council about its use. The council announced in 2019, a plan to buy the building and turn it into social housing.

== History ==
In 1909, rich industrialist Eusebi Güell built a police station in the La Salut district of Gràcia in Barcelona and handed it over to the Guardia Civil (Civil Guard), with an agreement that the building would revert to the ownership of the Güell family when the state stopped using it. The barracks were required since there were at the time many violent confrontations between trade unions and business owners in Barcelona. The 745m² building became derelict in 1983, when the Guardia Civil left after an attack by the Catalan nationalist group Terra Lliure. The Güell family attempted to reclaim the building but the Ministry of the Interior took over ownership then passed it on to the Ministry of Finance.

== Occupation ==
The building was squatted in November 1989, and given the name Kasa de la Muntanya. The name literally means "House of the Mountains" in Catalan with a "K" being used instead of the usual "C" in Casa, because squatters reclaimed the use of the letter "K" (seldom used in Spanish and Catalan) to signify their difference from mass society. The occupation of Kasa de la Muntanya heralded the heyday of squatting in Gràcia in the early 1990s. It became a well-known anarchist, anti-fascist and anti-capitalist self-managed social centre which hosts events such as talks, cafes, benefits, conferences and festivals. The daily newspaper La Vanguardia described it in 2017, as "el emblema del movimiento okupa en Barcelona" ("the emblem of the squatter movement in Barcelona").

The Güell family continued to press for the return of the building after the Guardia Civil officially relinquished it in 1992. The Tribunal Superior de Justicia de Madrid (Superior Court of Justice of Madrid) rejected the case, stating that the heirs were the heirs of the heirs and therefore had no right to the building. The family appealed to the highest court in the land, the Tribunal Supremo (Supreme Court), which sent the case back to the Tribunal Superior, where the family finally won the right to possession in 2007. The result was an impasse, with the squatters remaining in the building whilst the Güell family negotiated with the city council, which informed them that it was listed and not zoned for living.

A serious eviction attempt occurred in 2001, when the nearby Kan Ñoqui was evicted and the Policía Nacional (National Police Corps) seized the opportunity to evict Kasa de la Muntanya as well. During the two days of rioting which followed the eviction, the building was re-occupied and a man lost an eye to a rubber bullet fired by the police. After eleven years of legal battles the Spanish justice system refused the man any compensation for his loss and in 2013, he took his case to the European Court of Human Rights. The following year, the use of rubber bullets in Catalonia was banned.

The collective of Kasa de la Muntanya announced in 2013, that they had disassembled a sophisticated spy camera which had been recording everyone who entered and left the squat. The camera had first been installed on the roof of the Turó del Cargol school and then moved to the roof of Hospital de l’Esperança. In December 2014, the Mossos d'Esquadra (Catalonian police) raided Kasa de la Muntanya and other spaces in Barcelona looking for evidence of an alleged anarchist terror plot. None of the twenty people were in the house were arrested, although books, mobile telephones and computers were seized. The Audiencia Nacional (National Court) later threw out all charges related to the alleged plot in 2017.

The city council announced in 2019, that it had set aside 1,774,000 euros in order to buy the building from the Güell family. The plan was to construct 12 social housing apartments and the squatters said they supported social housing.

== Bibliography ==
- Altimira, Oriol Solé (30 May 2017). "La Audiencia Nacional tumba por segunda vez la investigación de los Mossos contra colectivos anarquistas". El Diario (in Spanish).
- Baqué, Irene (30 April 2014). "Catalonia police banned from using rubber bullets". The Guardian.
- Borràs, Xavier (10 October 2013). "La Kasa de la Muntanya denuncia que l'espiaven". Cooperativa (in Catalan).
- Cattaneo, Claudio; Tudela, Enrique (September 2014). "El Carrer Es Nostre! The Autonomous Movement in Barcelona 1980–2012". In Katzeff, Ask; van Hoogenhuijze, Leendert; van der Steen, Bart (eds.). The City Is Ours: Squatting and Autonomous Movements in Europe from the 1970s to the Present. PM Press. pp. 113–114. ISBN 978-1-60486-683-4.
- Debelle, Galvão; Cattaneo, Claudio; González, Robert; Barranco, Oriol; Llobet, Marta (2018). "Squatting Cycles in Barcelona: Identities, Repression and the Controversy of Institutionalisation". The Urban Politics of Squatters' Movements: 51–73. doi:10.1057/978-1-349-95314-1_3. ISBN 978-1-349-95313-4.
- EFE (16 December 2014a). "La 'Kasa de la Muntanya' de Barcelona: de cuartel de la Guardia Civil a centro antisistema". 20 Minutos (in Spanish).
- EFE (16 December 2014b). "Los Mossos registran varios espacios libertarios de Barcelona en una operación contra anarquistas". El Diario (in Spanish).
- Farré, Lluïsa (4 July 2013). "Stop Bales de Goma lleva el caso de Carles Guillot al Tribunal de Estrasburgo". El Diario (in Spanish).
- Fuentes, Juan Francisco (2017). "Usos ideológicos de la letra "K" en la España contemporánea: sobre el cambiante significado de un símbolo". Ariadna histórica. Lenguajes, conceptos, metáforas. (in Spanish). 6: 9–27. ISSN 2255-0968.
- Merino, Andreu (17 January 2019). "L'Ajuntament de Barcelona i la família Güell acorden l'expropiació de la Kasa de la Muntanya". Nació Digital (in Catalan).
- Staff writer (12 May 2017). "La familia Güell recupera la casa okupa de la Muntanya". La Vanguardia (in Spanish).
- Staff writer (6 December 2019). "L'Ajuntament reserva 1,7 milions per expropiar Kasa de la Muntanya a la família Güell". L'independent de Gràcia (in Catalan).
- Valsells, Roger (9 June 2019). "La Kasa de la Muntanya". El Cugatenc (in Catalan).
