= Patio Maravillas =

Artivist squat in Madrid

Coordinates: 40.4266°N 3.7081°W

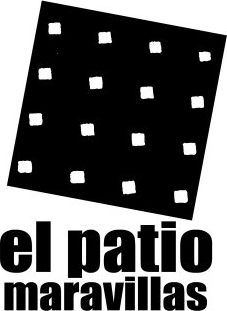
Logo of Patio Maravillas

Patio Maravillas was a multi-purpose self-managed social centre which occupied several spaces in central Madrid between 2007 and 2015.

== First building (2007–2010) ==
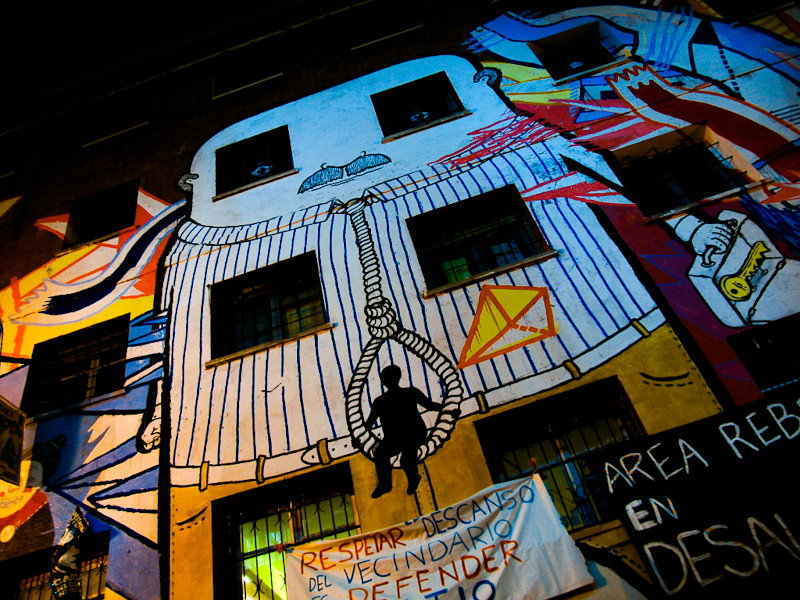
Patio Maravillas, 2009-12-10.

Patio Maravillas started life in the summer of 2007, with the squatting and fixing up of a building that was formerly a school and had been closed for 7 years, at 8 Acuerdo Street, in the Malasaña district.

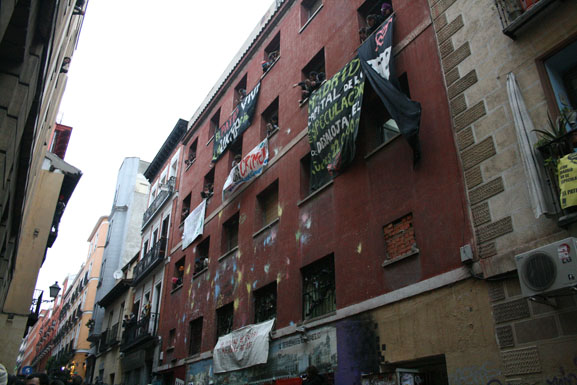
Patio Maravillas, 2009-01-22.

Its opening took place on 4, 5, 6 and 7 October, three months after it opened. Different activities were organized to involve people living in the neighbourhood. Its philosophy, both campaigning and respectful, allows participation by a large number of different groups and individuals that have joined one by one and made it their focal point. Everything is for free and done by volunteers.

There were several permanent activities such as:

- Bicicritica bicycle repair workshop
- Video and documentary screenings (Cinema Maravillas)
- A hacklab called Hackers Against the Machine Lab (HAMLAB). In honour of their inspirations Isaac Asimov and Luther Blissett all communications from the lab were signed Dr. Isaac Hacksimov.
- Cafeteria that served as a meeting point and cultural and social exchange
- Urban allotment on the roof
- Language classes
- Workshops
- Political and feminist discussion
- The "chikiasamblea" (children's activities and games room)
- Photography workshop (Foto Patio)
- Rights advice

There were also theatre, painting, music, audiovisual, and immigration groups, that met, rehearsed, and carried out their activities in the space. There were also special activities such as concerts, exhibitions, neighbourhood meetings, talks about health and consumer issues, and meetings of different groups. There have also been performances by groups and soloists including Grande Marlaska and Amparanoia.

In 2009, an eviction attempt was thwarted by the number of people resisting.

== Second building (2010–2015) ==
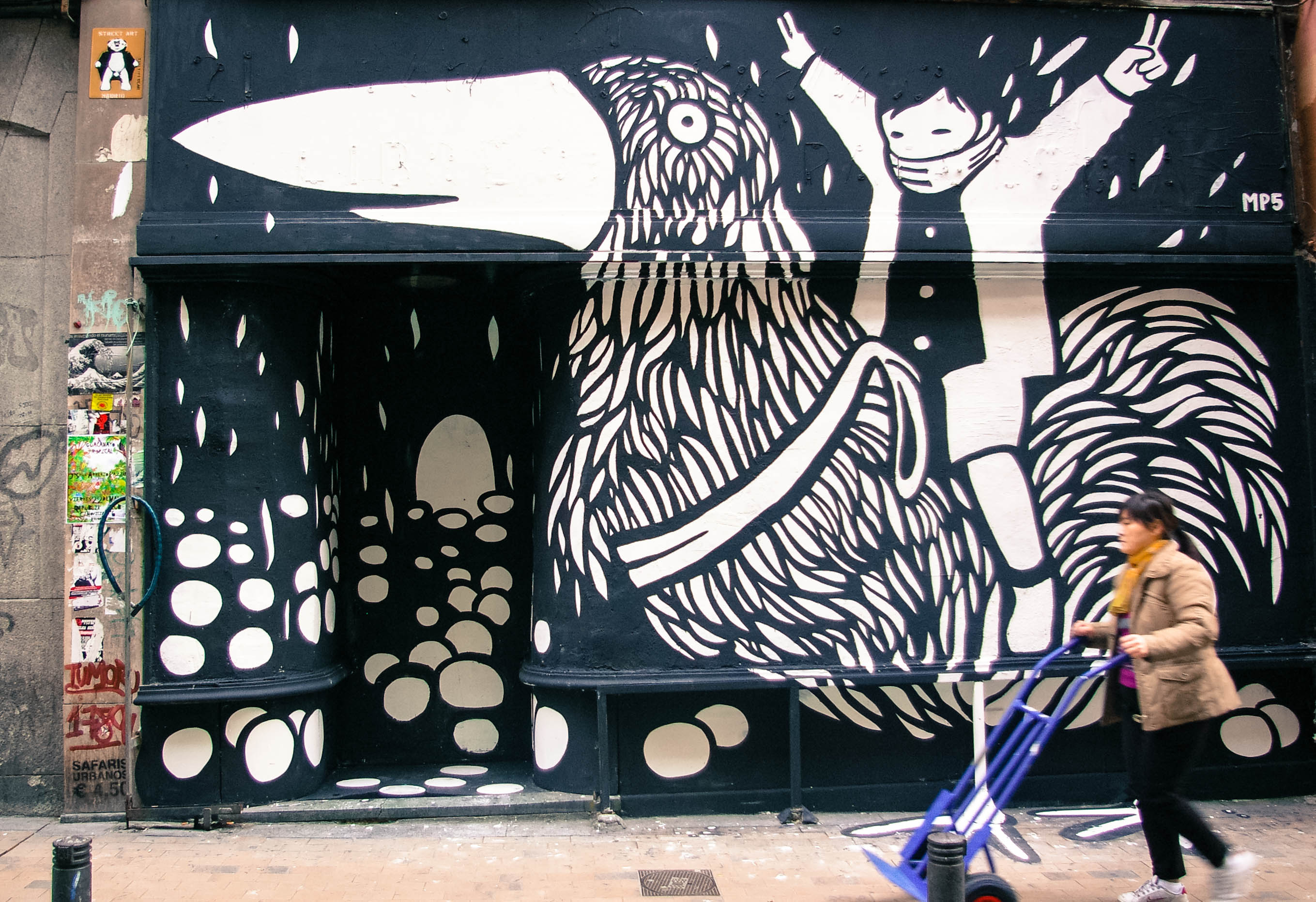
Mural on front of Patio Maravillas, 2013

Following a legal suit by the legal owner, Acuerdo 8 was cleared by the police on January 6, 2010. On the same day, the Patio Maravillas community organized a peaceful protest demonstration in the area of Plaza del Dos de Mayo, summoning hundreds of people who were guided through the neighborhood until nearby Pez Street, where a group of activists had just entered a new long-abandoned building at number 21. One day after the clearing of Acuerdo, the fixing up of the building and resuming of the Patio activities in the new space were underway.

Patio Mariavillas came to have strong links with the 15-M Movement, supporting the protests at Puerta del Sol which was close nearby.

Pez 21 was evicted in June 2015, one day before the mayor of Madrid stepped down. Politicians from Ahora Madrid and Podemos criticised the action. The former released a statement declaring that Madrid needed “to open and not close down citizen-run spaces. The city needs to listen to projects such as Patio Maravillas.”

== Third building (2015–2015) ==
The same day as the eviction of Pez 21, a new building was squatted on 9 Divino Pastor Street. It was owned by Miguel Ángel Capriles López, cousin of Venezuelan opposition leader Henrique Capriles. It had five floors and a basement. On August 4, 2015, this building was evicted.

== See also ==
- Artivist Organizations
- La Ingobernable
- La Tabacalera de Lavapiés
