= Can Vies =

Self-managed social centre in Barcelona

- Centre Social Autogestionat Can Vies
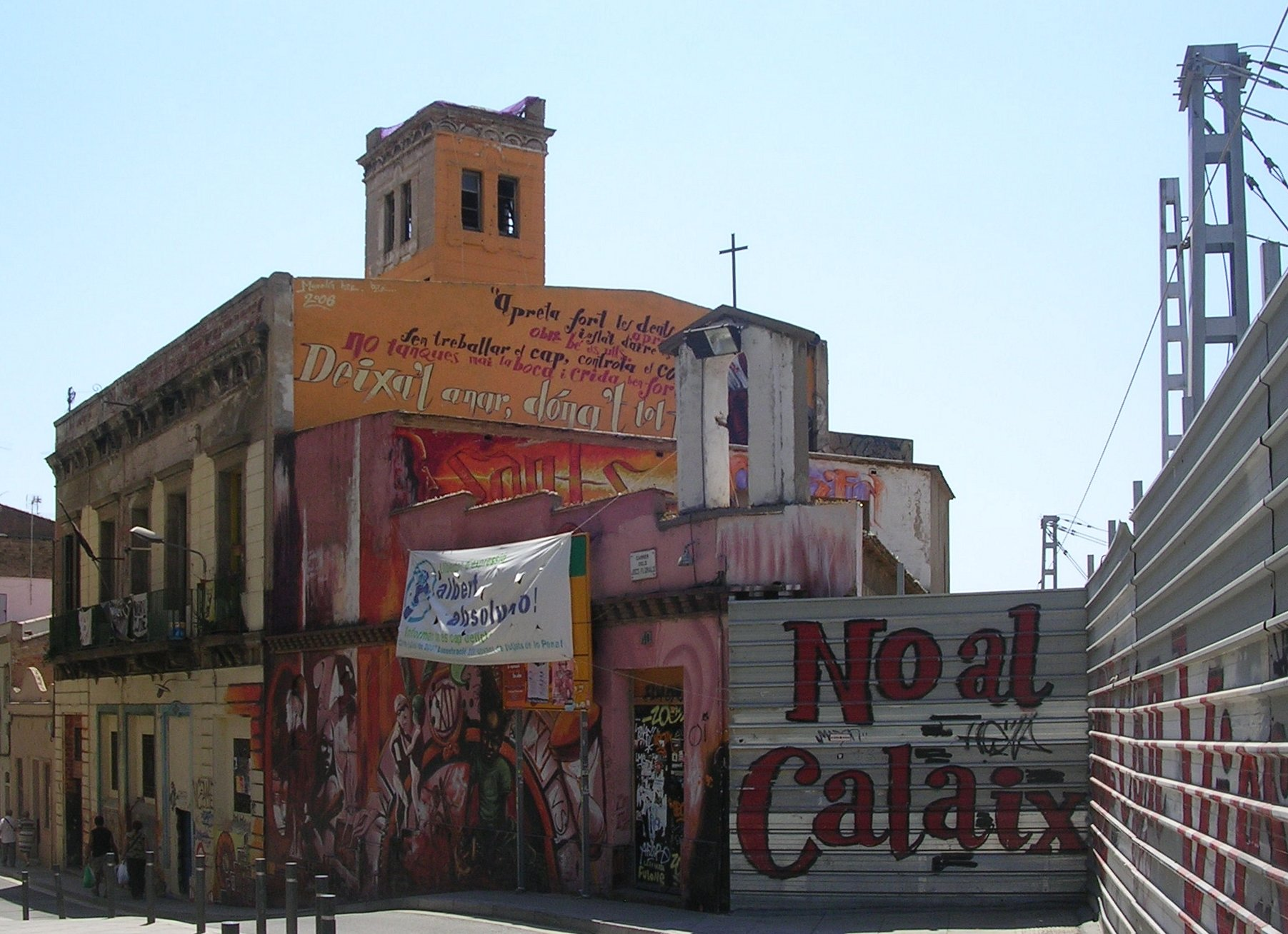

General information
- Location: Sants, Barcelona
- Country: Spain
- Coordinates: 41.3741°N 2.1346°E
- Completed: 1879
- Owner: Transports Metropolitans de Barcelona

Can Vies (also known as Centre Social Autogestionat Can Vies) is a building located in the Sants neighborhood of Barcelona, built in 1879. It has been squatted since 1997, when a group of youths occupied it and began using it as a self-managed social centre and infoshop. In late May 2014, riots broke out in a successful attempt to stop an eviction. The building was partially demolished and rebuilt by the local community.

== Eviction attempt ==
In May 2014, negotiations took place between the owners of the building, Barcelona's public transport operator Transports Metropolitans de Barcelona and the squatters. After the negotiations failed, the building was evicted on May 26, and demolition works commenced. As a result, Barcelona experienced riots and protests during the following nights. The protests also spread to the cities of Madrid, Mallorca and Valencia. The government sent an additional 200 police officers to Barcelona to help in dealing with the protests. In a successful attempt to stop the demolition, protesters built barricades and set the excavator on fire.

== Reconstruction ==
The building was resquatted and a community-based reconstruction program begun. The local government announced on May 30, that the building would not be demolished. Can Vies launched a crowdfunding campaign to fund the rebuilding costs, which were estimated at €70,000. In the end, €90,000 was quickly raised.

== See also ==
- Squatting in Spain
