= Kukutza =

Series of squatted social centres in Bilbao

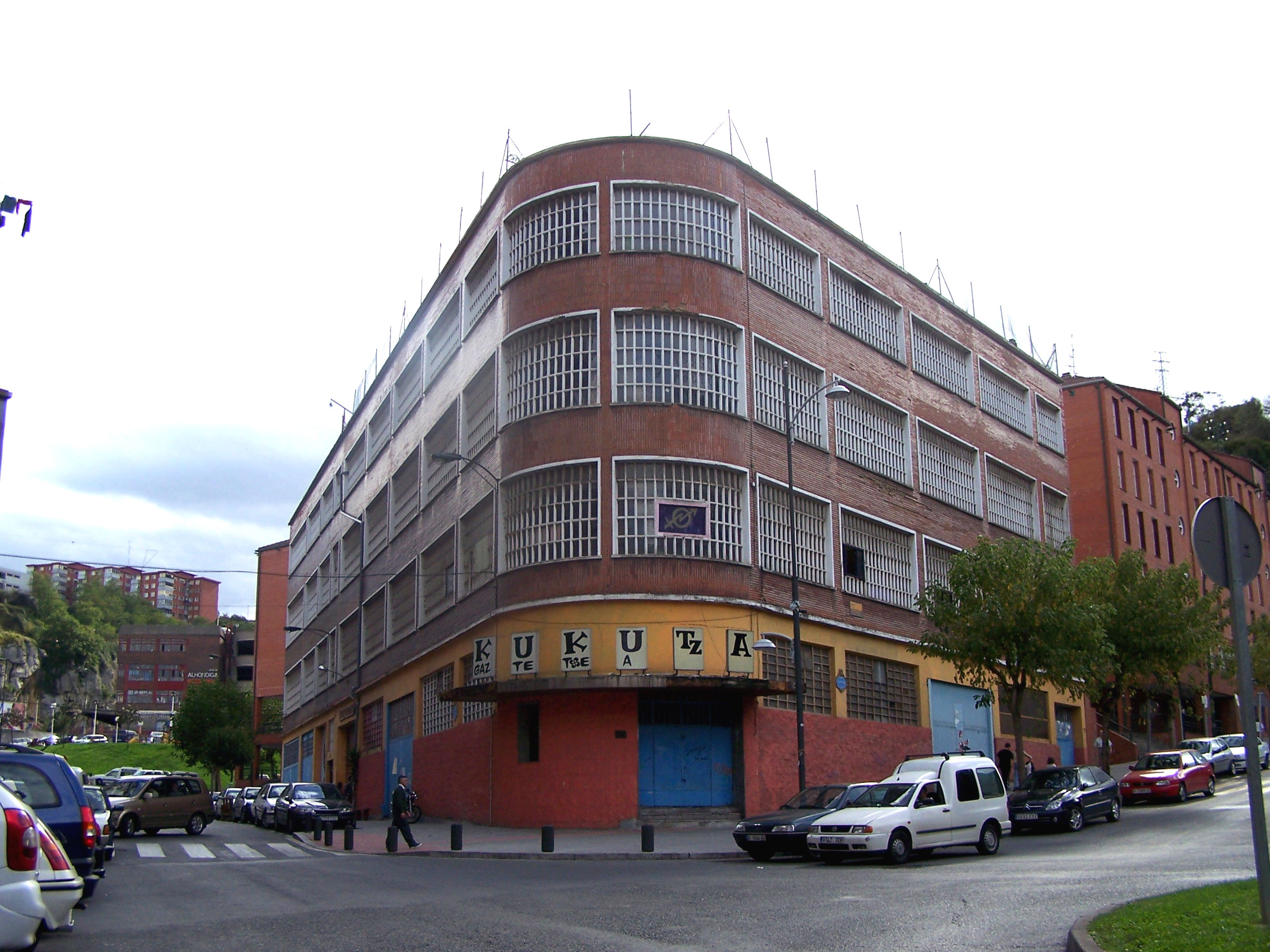
Kukutza III in 2005

Kukutza was a gaztetxe (self-managed social centre) in the neighbourhood of Recalde, Bilbao. It operated as a squatted free space between 1996 and 2011. It was used as a youth, unemployed and cultural centre. In those 15 years it had 3 different buildings. The first one, Kukutza I, was used in 1996 and just for 3 months, then Kukutza II in 1998 and for 2 months, and finally, Kukutza III, open between 1998 and 2011 and had a large activity programme. It was set in an abandoned factory and closed in 2011 because it was violently evicted by the police.

From the very beginning, Kukutza provided the neighbours of Recalde with cultural and spare time activities, which were not offered by institutions. In the case of Kukutza III, it was a meeting place for many local groups. Moreover, it had influences in the whole of Bilbao and even started being a reference point for artists from all over the Basque country.

== Kukutza I ==
In 1996, Kukutza I was squatted by the young people of Recalde, Irala, Indautxu, Basurto and Zornotza. It was the first "gaztetxe" in Recalde, and was a building that had been empty for 11 years. Three months later it was demolished, without any notice. Two days later the "gaztetxe" Mina del Morro od Santutxu was also demolished, and the same year the Mayor of Bilbao, Josu Ortuondo, also ordered the eviction of the "gaztetxe" of the old town of Bilbao.

== Kukutza II ==
Kukutza II was occupied in 1998 on Larraskitu street in Recalde. The Ertzaintza (Basque Public Guard) tried to evict from the first day onwards but they were unable to do so. In June, toxic substances were found and the place was closed provisionally. In June 1998, it was definitively evicted, with 4 people arrested.

== Kukutza III ==
=== Occupation ===
Kukutza III began August 6, 1998, with the occupation of the old factory Cerezo in Recalde. There were many legal problems with the building, and the neighbours of Recalde asked for it to be used as a cultural centre. Although some institutions claimed that the building was perfect for cultural activities, the town hall did not give it any protection.

=== Activities ===
The centre hosted many types of activities, such as dance and hiking groups, a library, a canteen, a pub, theatre classes. In 2011, its eviction was ordered so it could be replaced with housing, but now nothing was built and local shopkeepers have stated the neighbourhood has lost its life. To protest the eviction, hundreds of users of the project made a ten-minute lip dub video.

=== Eviction and demolition ===
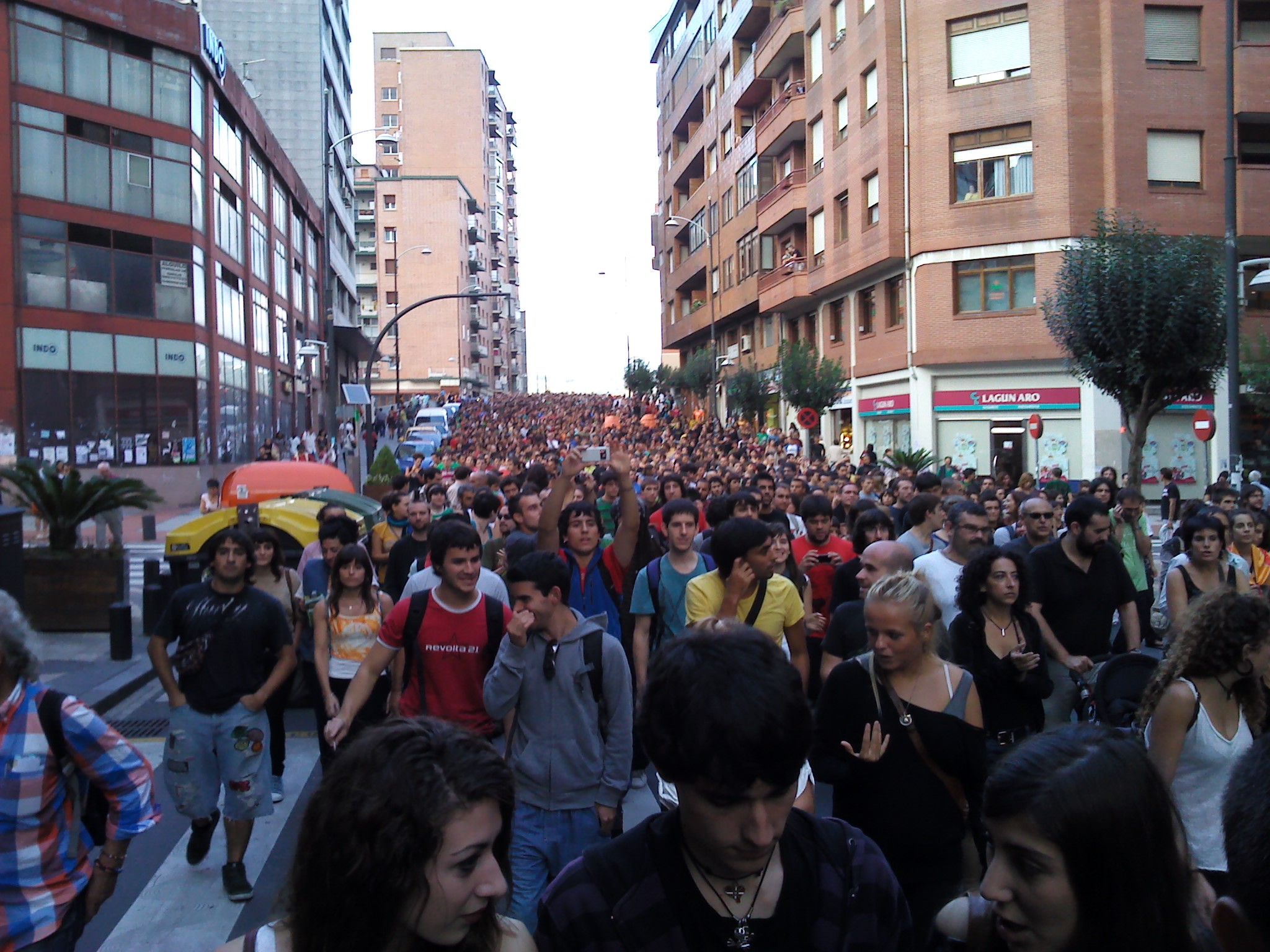
Mass demonstration against the demolition of Kukutza in September 2011

On September 21, 2011, the police helped the Ertzaintza in the eviction of the building, an action which was later criticised by the ELA union. The police entered the building at 05:30 and fired plastic bullets at activists.

The demonstrations protesting against the eviction resulted in many riots all over Bilbao for the next few days. As a result of the riots, 810 rubbish bins were knocked over, and some of them were also burnt or broken. In addition, 10 vehicles were burnt and the batzokis (social centres of the Basque Nationalist Party) of Recalde and the old town were attacked. The damages were estimated at €140,000. 64 people were arrested in the demonstrations and 76 medical reports of injuries and 53 complaints for police brutality were recorded. The mayor of Bilbao, Iñaki Azkuna, and the home affairs councillor, Rodolfo Ares, defended the police action in these incidents. However, it was called to be disproportionate by the Ombudsman Iñigo Lamarca. The building was then demolished on September 24.

=== Judicial processes ===
Although most of the prosecutions against the police were closed as a result of the impossibility of identifying the implicated officers, one was found guilty and had to pay a fine and victim compensation for assaulting a woman "unnecessarily". He was filmed kicking her in the stomach.

In addition, most of the people processed for taking part in the demonstrations were absolved. Four teenagers were convicted for attacking a policeman. Two German activists were found not guilty. In February 2015, one of the people arrested in the eviction was convicted to 3 years in prison for aggravated assault on officers.

=== Successor ===
In October 2012, a factory outside Bilbao was squatted as a successor to Kukutza. It is called Txirbilenea.

== See also ==
- Errekaleor
- Squatting in Spain
