= La Tabacalera de Lavapiés =

Cultural and social center in Madrid, Spain

Coordinates: 40.4063°N 3.7028°W

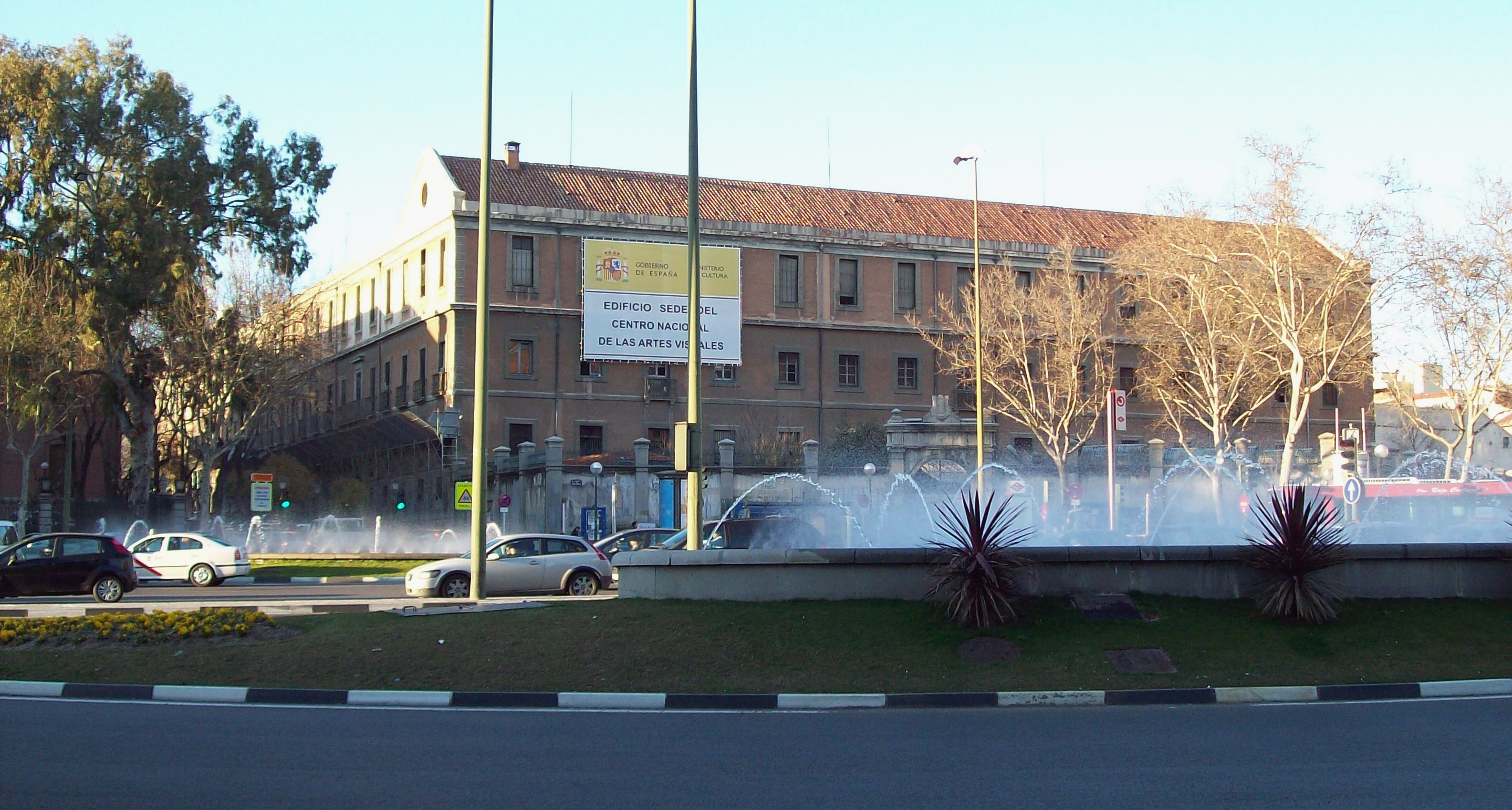
- Exterior of the building
- Established: 2010
- Location: c/ Embajadores 51; Madrid, Spain
- Type: Cultural center, Autonomous social center, Art gallery
- Website: latabacalera.net

Tabacalera de Lavapiés (Tabacalera of Lavapiés) or Centro Social Autogestionado La Tabacalera de Lavapiés (Self-managed Social Center Tabacalera of Lavapiés) is a well-known cultural and social center in Madrid, Spain. It consists of a large (9,200 m^{2}; 97,000 sq ft) set of connected buildings in the central neighbourhood of Lavapiés. The buildings are property of the Spanish Ministry of Culture, although since 2010 its use has been transferred to a local grassroots association, and since then it is managed by a local organization. The space hosts a fab lab, a theatre, several music bands, artist collectives and social activities. It is considered one of the major spots for cultural activities in the city, especially among the youth.

== History ==
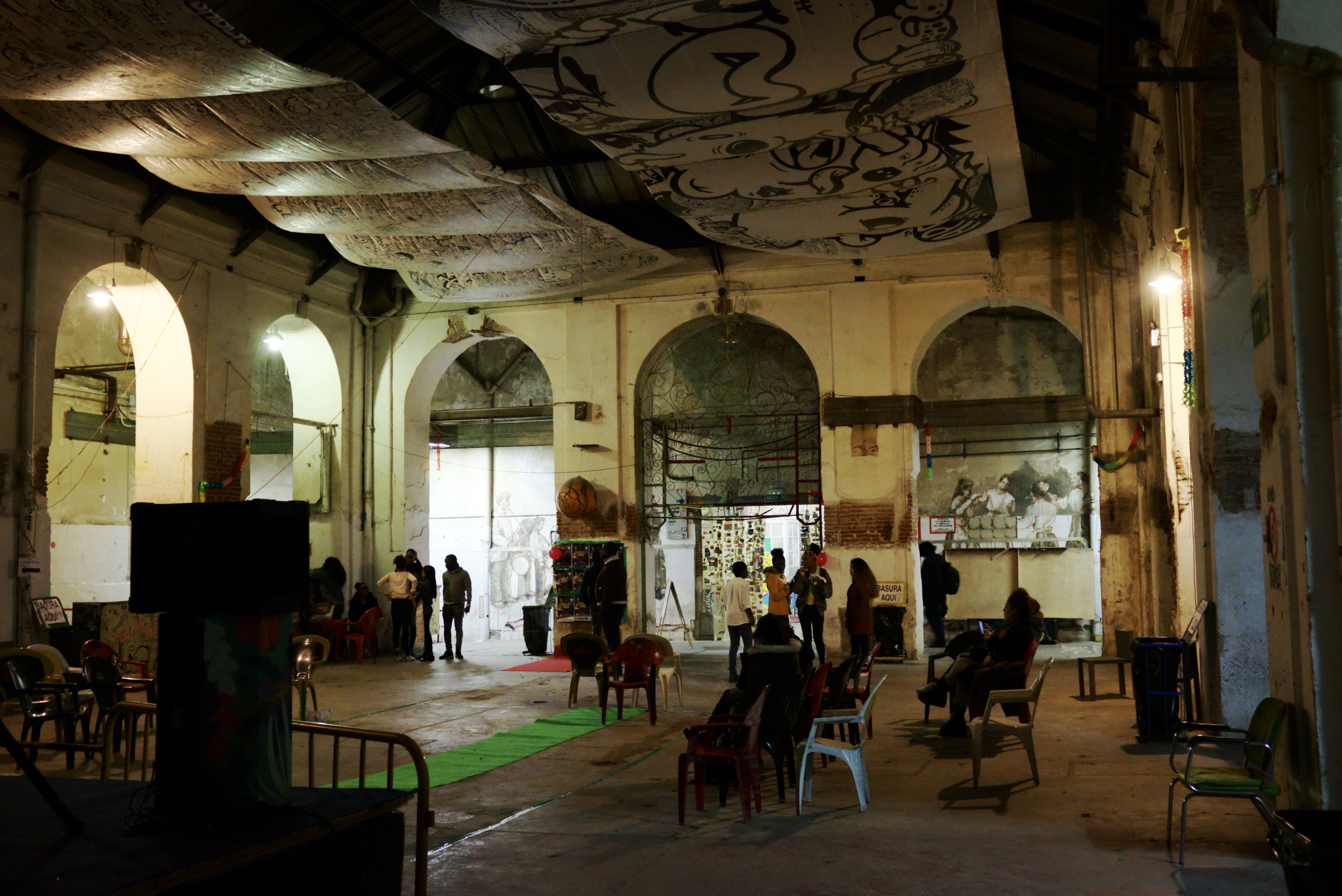
Interior of the building

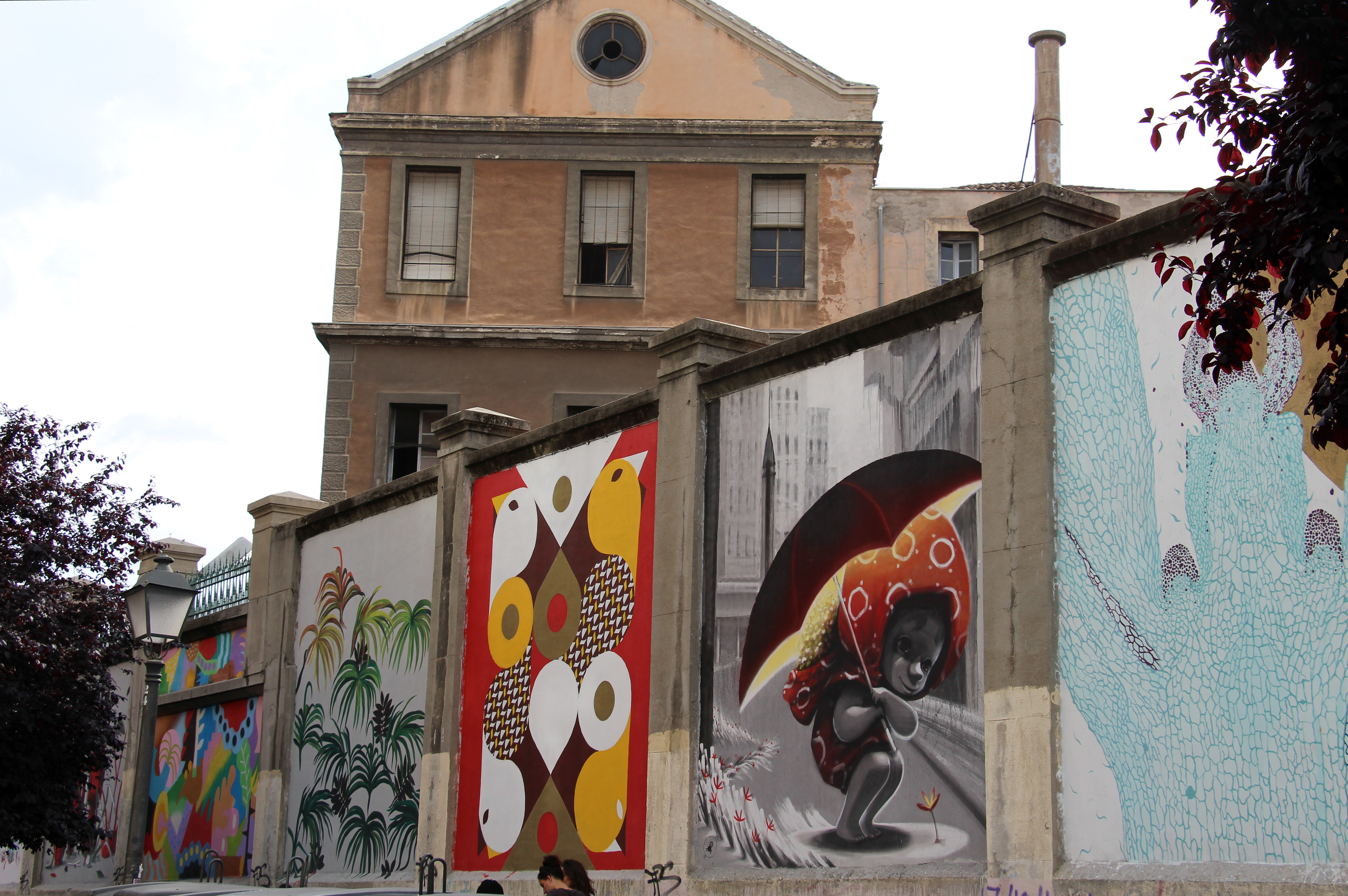
Street art at the former Tobacco Factory of Embajadores

The set of buildings was an old abandoned tobacco factory, built at the behest of King Charles III of Spain in 1781. Beginning in 1809, the factory manufactured tobacco, employing 6,000 female workers, in a space of 30,000 m^{2} (355,000-square-foot). In 1977, the building was listed as part of the Spanish Cultural Heritage, receiving the Bien de Interés Cultural mention. The factory remained in operation until the privatization of the public tobacco monopoly Tabacalera in 1999, when the buildings properly was transferred to the Spanish Ministry of Culture.

In the following 10 years, the building was abandoned and under-maintained. Since its closure, several local grassroots collectives from Lavapiés organized to claim the abandoned property for the neighbourhood, as a new socio-cultural center. Starting in 2004, multiple activities took place under the "Tabacalera A Debate" (Tabacalera under debate) series, with the support of multiple artists, personalities of the world of culture and museum directors. Eventually, in 2010 the Ministry of Culture signed an agreement with the local association SCCPP, leasing out the property on a yearly basis. In such agreement, the Ministry agreed to undertake, the "cultural project CSA La Tabacalera de Lavapiés, presented by the Association SCCPP, as a pilot experiment for social interaction with different parties that might be committed to the social, creative and intellectual development of the people in their community." In late 2011, the agreement was renewed, this time with the new Association for the Tabacalera of Lavapiés, for 8 years, with a 2-year renewable lease.

A third of its total surface, 9,200 m2 (97,000 sq ft) is dedicated to the Centro Social Autogestionado La Tabacalera de Lavapiés (Autonomous Social Center Tabacalera of Lavapiés).

== Activities ==
The center is based on five principles underlined in its founding agreement : self-management, participatory democracy, support of the Free Culture practices, a critical stance towards traditional cultural management, and socio-cultural expression. As such, the center was quickly known for housing a large diversity of collectives, focused on social, cultural and artistic activities. Because of its participatory and self-management principles, it is managed by bi-weekly open assemblies and open commissions, and the collectives hosted are requested to be horizontal and open. As the center subscribes to the Free Culture movement, multiple collectives release their works under Creative Commons licenses.

The center has a large building and several smaller buildings, a community garden, patio space, bar, library, a free shop and restaurant. It hosts multiple artistic activities, such as murals as part of the Madrid Street Art Project, urban graffiti art in its galleries, or photo exhibitions such as PHotoEspaña, Madrid's international festival of photography and visual arts. It houses a theatre which provides multiple performing art activities, including theatre, circus arts, skateboarding, and dance, and has a wide range of music collectives from different cultures, such as reggae or afro, which host regular concerts. It provides workshops to teach drawing, cooking, bike repair, sewing, serigraphy, legal issues, or video-making. It regularly hosts wrestling matches of international relevance, flea markets, film festivals, and socio-political activities such as meetings, debates and lectures. The center is also base of a hackerspace and the fab lab Nave Trapecio.

After 2011's 15-M protests, the President of the Madrid region, Cristina Cifuentes, together with several right-wing newspapers, criticized the social center for hosting protester meetings and migrant rights advocates.

== International recognition ==
Time Out magazine wrote that "Lavapiés has the largest number of neighbourhood associations and self-managed centres in Madrid; the most well-known is La Tabacalera de Lavapiés. Located in an old tobacco factory, it's a collective cultural space where anyone can submit a proposal to set up an exhibit, organise a debate or show a documentary they've made. Thanks to centres like this one, cultural events are quite popular in this barrio and always supported by the locals."

Atlas Obscura magazine considered it "one of the most striking examples of Madrid's cultural diversity" and a "bastion of democracy" Both the New York Times and the Washington Post recommended a visit. It has also been considered "Madrid's most exciting art space" because of its "vibrant artistic community", and "Madrid's Most Culturally Diverse Space".

== See also ==
- Lavapiés
- La Ingobernable
- Patio Maravillas
