= Desokupa =

Spanish company

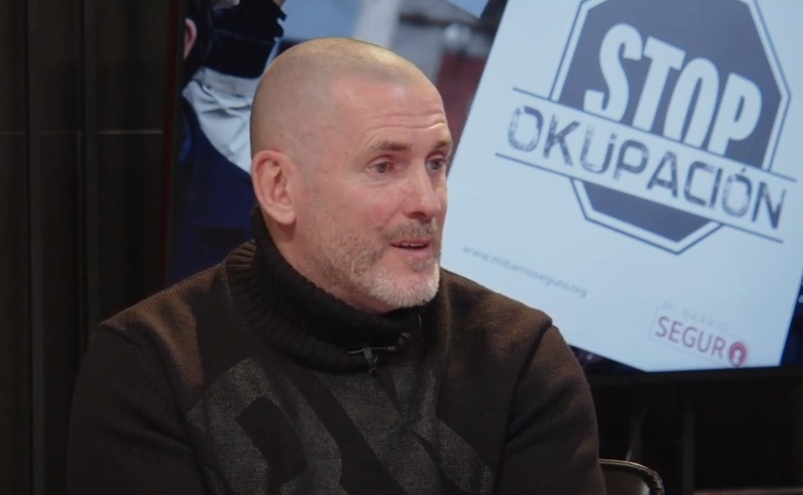
Dani Esteve, founder of Desokupa

Desokupa is a Spanish company that carries out evictions of squatters. It was established in 2014.

== Business ==
The company was set up in October 2014 with the corporate name Coexistance [sic] and Respect S. L., with an address in Barcelona. Its founder is Dani Esteve, a qualified security guard since 1999. In April 2016, the company dissolved itself due to demands for debts to the Treasury. It was re-established in July 2016 as Conciencia y Respeto 1970 S. L..

In October 2022, it was announced that Desokupa offered consulting advice to 15 city councils on how to deal with squatters, for an annual fee of €3,000. Esteve said that he had offered such services for four years to councils across Spain.

In the 2022 financial year, Desokupa reported income of €880,000, and Esteve received a salary of €180,000.

== Politics ==
Esteve said in 2025 that he supported the anti-immigration policy of Vox, but also had views in favour of animal rights.

During the 2023 Barcelona City Council election, Desokupa protested against left-wing mayor Ada Colau. Esteve had predicted that hundreds of thousands would demonstrate, but only around 800 did.

In the 2023 Spanish general election campaign, Desokupa erected a billboard showing prime minister Pedro Sánchez in front of a flag of Morocco and an aeroplane, with the slogan "You to Morocco, Desokupa to Moncloa", referring to the prime minister's residence. The billboard was vandalised by opponents of evictions, and Desokupa resolved with the Junta Electoral Central that the billboard was covered by freedom of expression.

== Legal issues ==
Esteve has already been arrested and charged with extortion, unlawful detention, bodily harm, harassment, and criminal association while running morososbcn.com.

In May 2023, Ione Belarra, president of Podemos and minister of social rights and 2030 Agenda, proposed criminalising companies such as Desokupa, with a four-year prison sentence.

In July 2023, a court in Barcelona ordered Esteve to pay €5,899 to a person filmed in a video of an eviction, ruling that the video was an advertisement depicting the complainant without permission.

In March 2025, proceedings were brought against him for hate crimes for threatening migrants.
