= Eskalera Karakola =

Squat in Madrid, Spain

Coordinates: 40°24′28.74″N 3°42′15.76″W

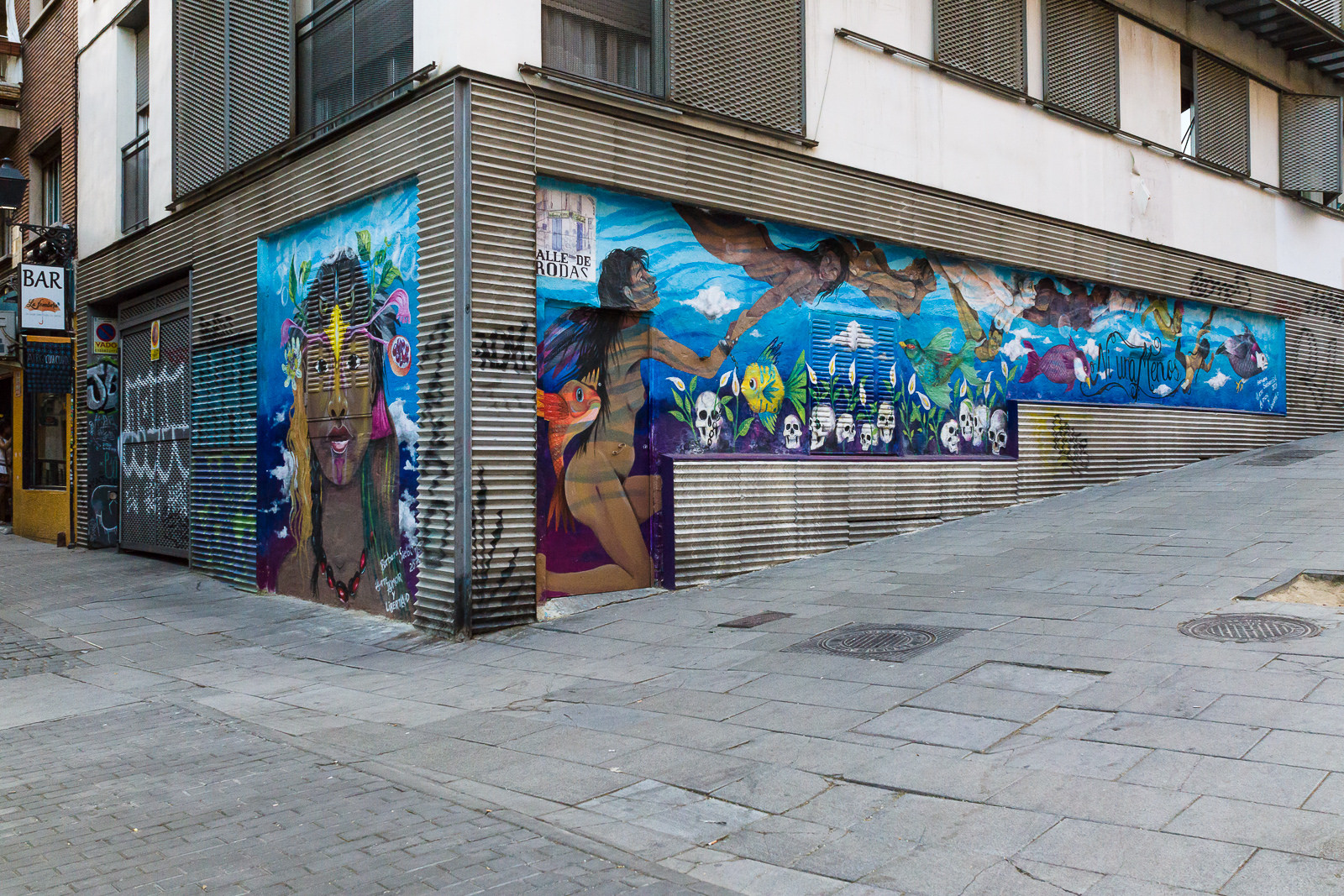
- EKKA at Calle de Embajadores 52

General information
- Address: Calle de Embajadores 52
- Town or city: Madrid
- Country: Spain

Website
- eskalerakarakola.org

Eskalera Karakola is a feminist self-managed social centre in Madrid, Spain. Women squatted a bakery on Calle de Embajadores 40 from 1996 until 2005, whereupon they were given a building at Calle de Embajadores 52.

== History ==
Eskalera Karakola (EKKA) emerged from a squat on Lavapiés 15, in the Lavapiés district, in 1996. Staying in Lavapiés, several female participants decided to make a women-only occupation in a former bakery at Calle Embajadores 40. The project was eventually legalised in 2005, when it moved to its present location at Calle de Embajadores 52. The bakery was evicted in 2005 and subsequently demolished.

== Activities ==
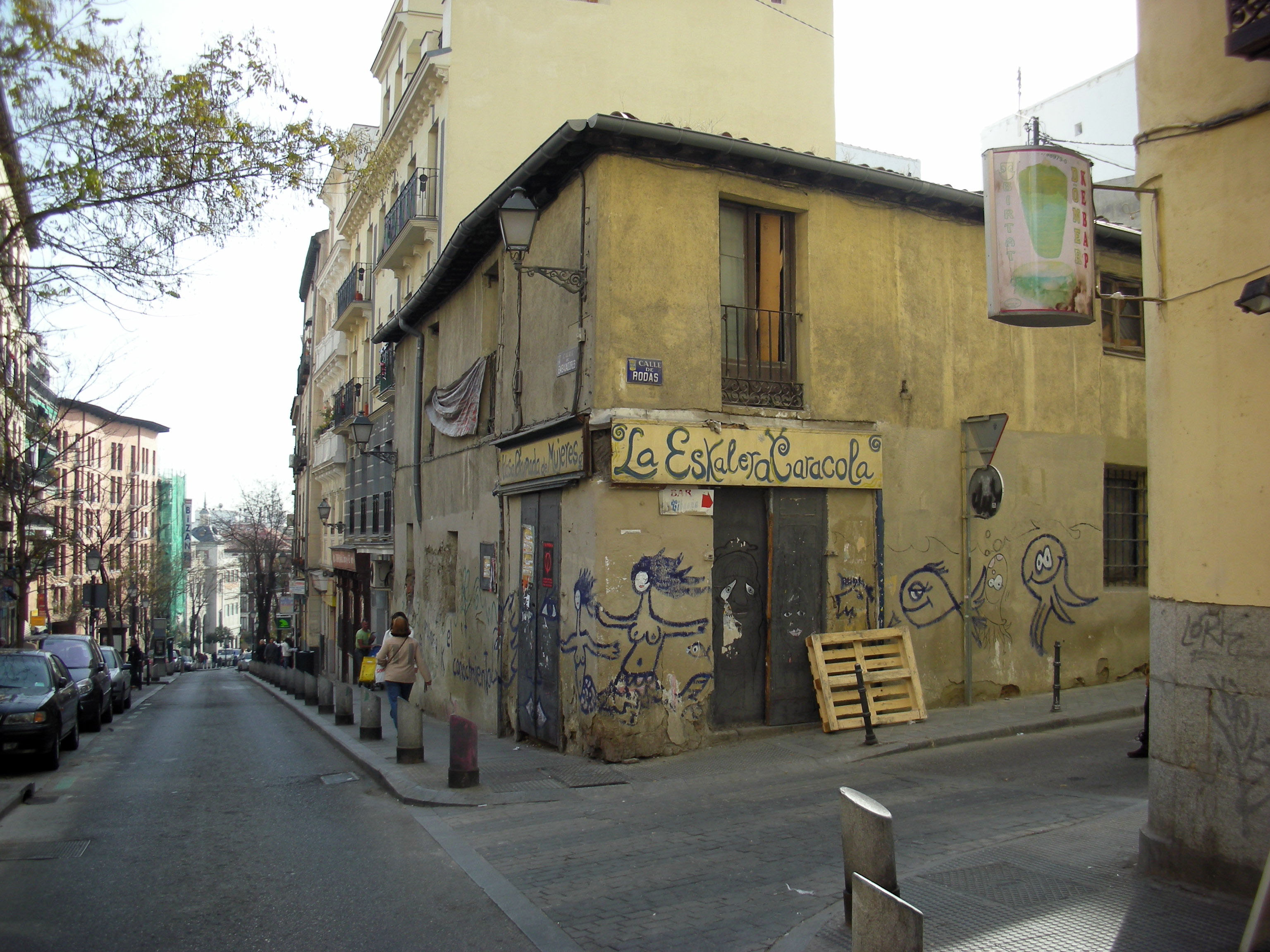
Eskalera Karakola at Calle de Embajadores 40

Eskalera Karakola works on the principles of autogestion and organizes activities focusing on domestic violence and women's precarity in post-industrial capitalism. In 2002, it created a Female Workers' Laboratory (Laboratorio de Trabajadoras), and has carried out anti-racist activities, in particular with female immigrants, since 1998. Eskalera Karakola also took part in the organization of the LGBT Pride and the forum "Women and Architecture". It participated in alter-globalization events such as the European Social Forum and is part of the European nextGENDERation network. It publishes a review, Mujeres Preokupando (a pun between "Concerned Women" and "Pre-Squatting Women").

The research collective Precarias a la Deriva formed out of discussions at the social centre. During the COVID-19 pandemic in Spain, its activities went online.
