= La Ingobernable =

Self-managed community space in Spain

Coordinates: 40.4133°N 3.6908°W

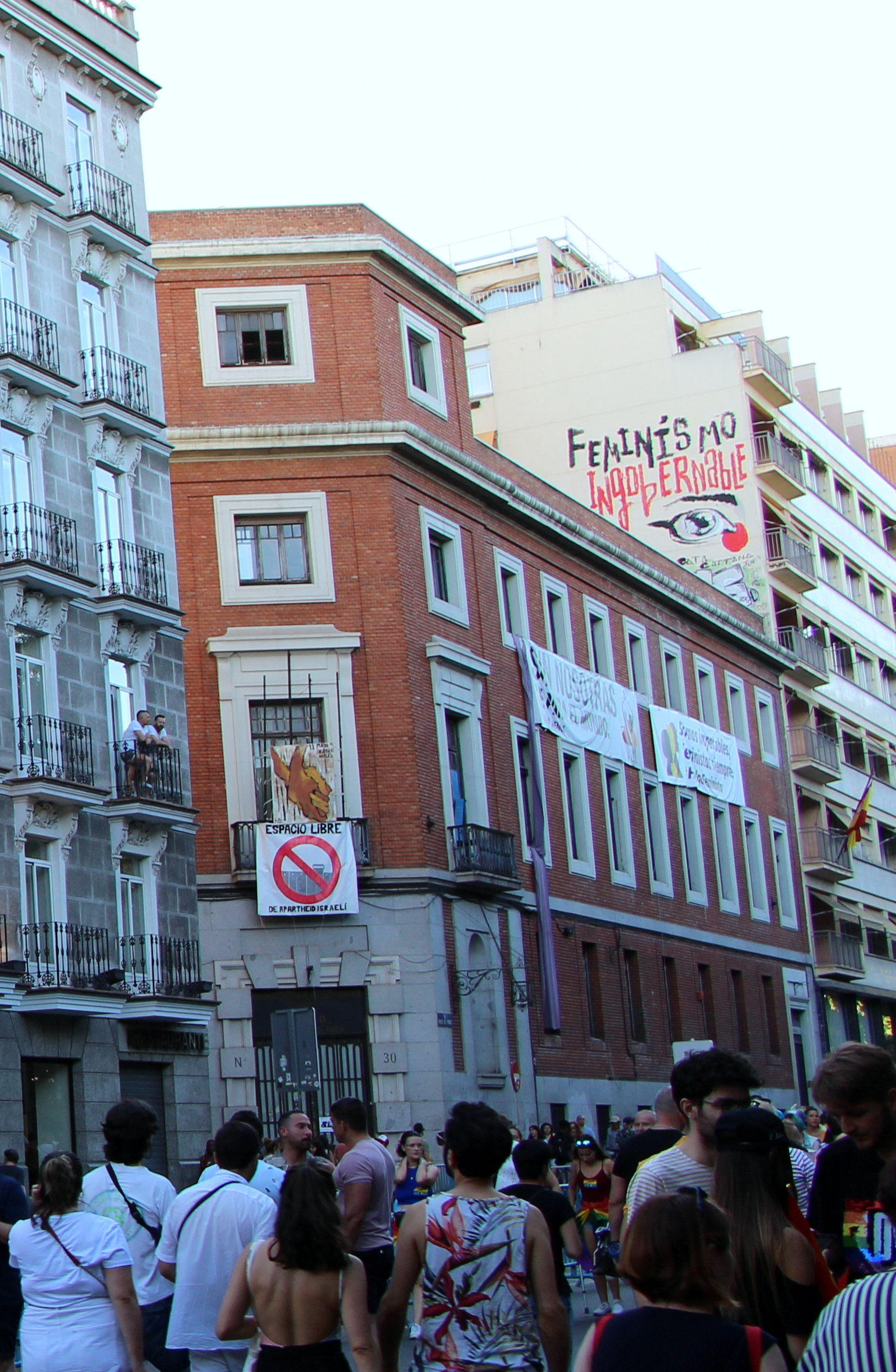
La Ingobernable in 2019

La Ingobernable is a series of self-managed social centres in central Madrid, Spain. The squats have been used by feminist, environmentalists, LGBTI, anti-racist and other cultural groups. Between 2017 and 2019, La Ingobernable was based in a municipal building located at the corner of Paseo del Prado and Calle del Gobernador (hence its name, which means ungovernable). It was then located at Calle Alberto Bosch 4, behind the Prado Museum from March until April 2020, when it was evicted during the state of alarm. In 2021, an Office for Social Rights was set up at Calle Cruz 5.

== Paseo del Prado ==
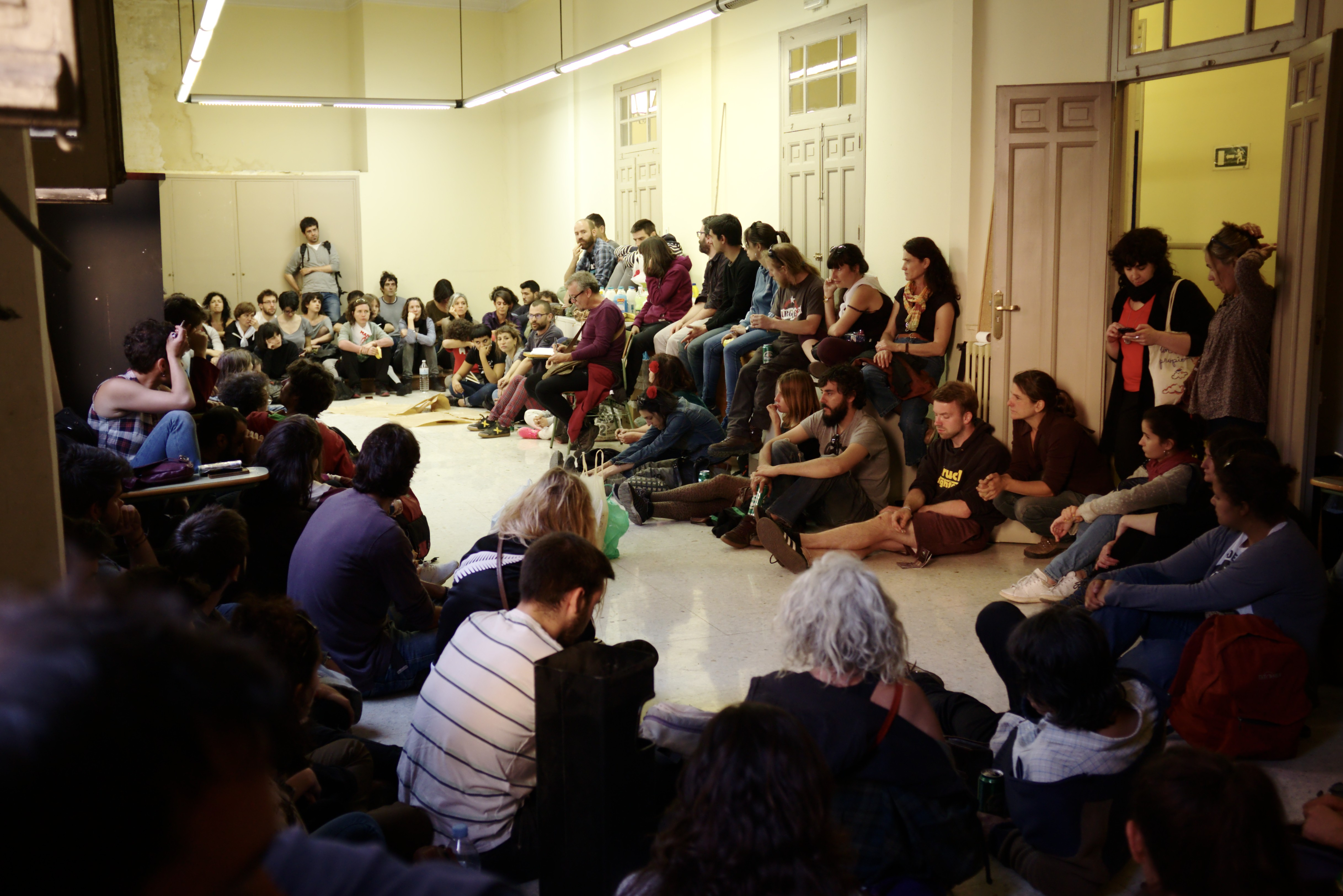
Assembly of La Ingobernable

The 3,000m² building in the centre of Madrid had previously been the headquarters of UNED and a health centre before being left empty. Four years later, in 2017, when the new plans were stalled and the building was derelict, representatives of social movements and civil society organisations from Madrid squatted the building with the intention of claiming public spaces in the city for the neighbourhood. It was occupied on 6 May, 2017, fulfilling the desire of activists to have a self-managed social centre in the heart of the city.

A month after being occupied, La Ingobernable claimed to have organized 135 activities, 81 of them cultural. After two years, it was estimated that more than 100,000 people have attended over 170 monthly activities that the social centre organizes and communicates through its website and social networks. Hundreds of people go there every week to participate in a talk, workshop, assembly, exhibition or concert. Inside there is a self-managed bar service, a free clothing store, film library, art workshop and children's space, amongst other things. La Ingobernable served as a logistics centre during the two feminist strikes of 8 March in 2018 and 2019. As well as feminist collectives, the space was used by environmentalists, LGBTI, anti-racist and cultural groups.

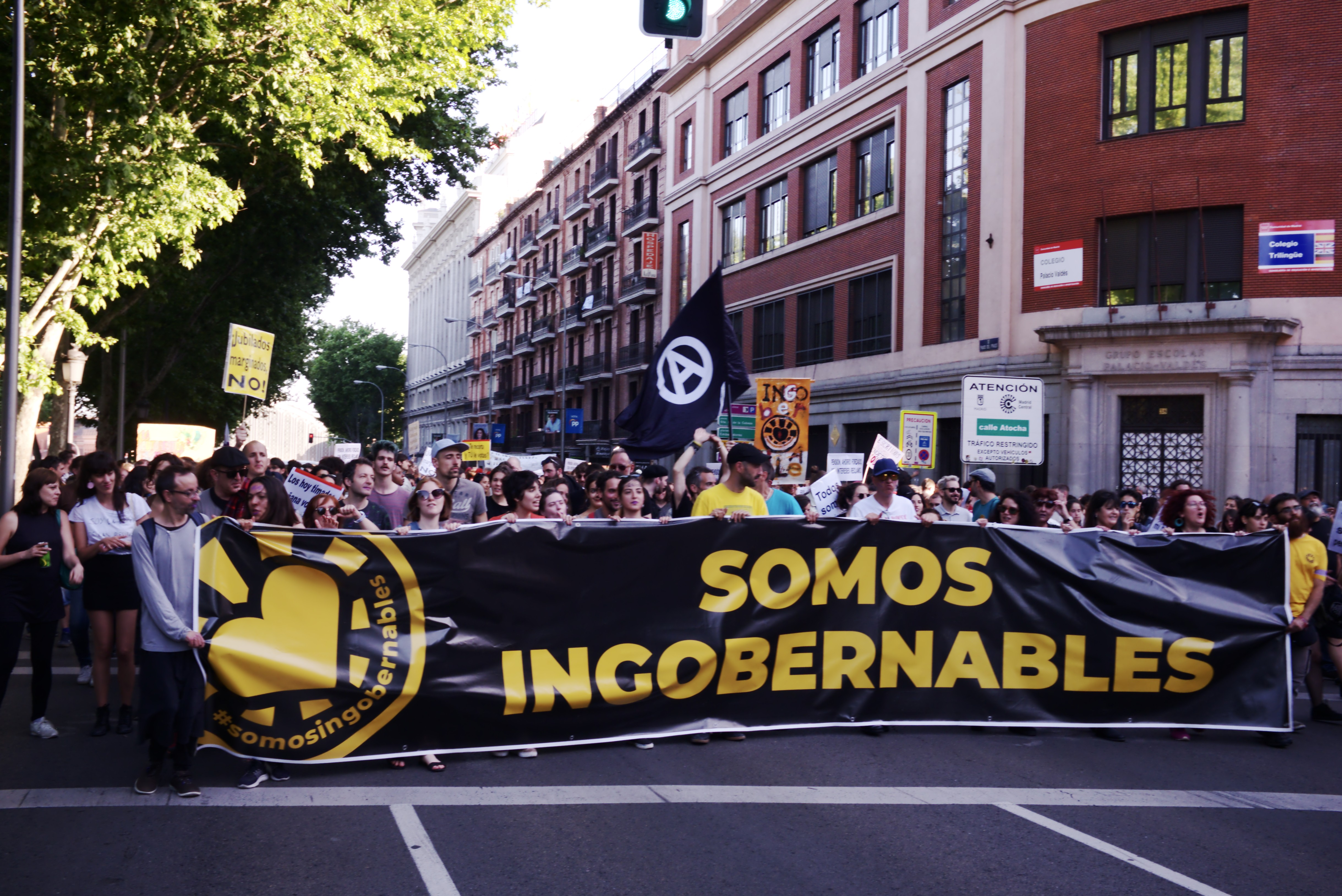
Demonstration in support of La Ingobernable

The first eviction order for La Ingobernable was issued in April 2018 but was not executed. There was a second attempt to evict in June 2018, which also unsuccessful. The centre had called for a day of resistance and met the municipal agents with churros. A spokesperson stated that the centre had offered to undergo a legalisation process but the council was not interested. On 11 May 2019, between 700 and 800 people made a demonstration in support of La Ingobernable on the occasion of its second birthday. The centre was evicted on 13 November, 2019, by a police operation which began at 03.00 and involved 130 agents. In June 2020, the superior court of justice of Madrid declared that the eviction was illegal.

== Calle Alberto Bosch ==
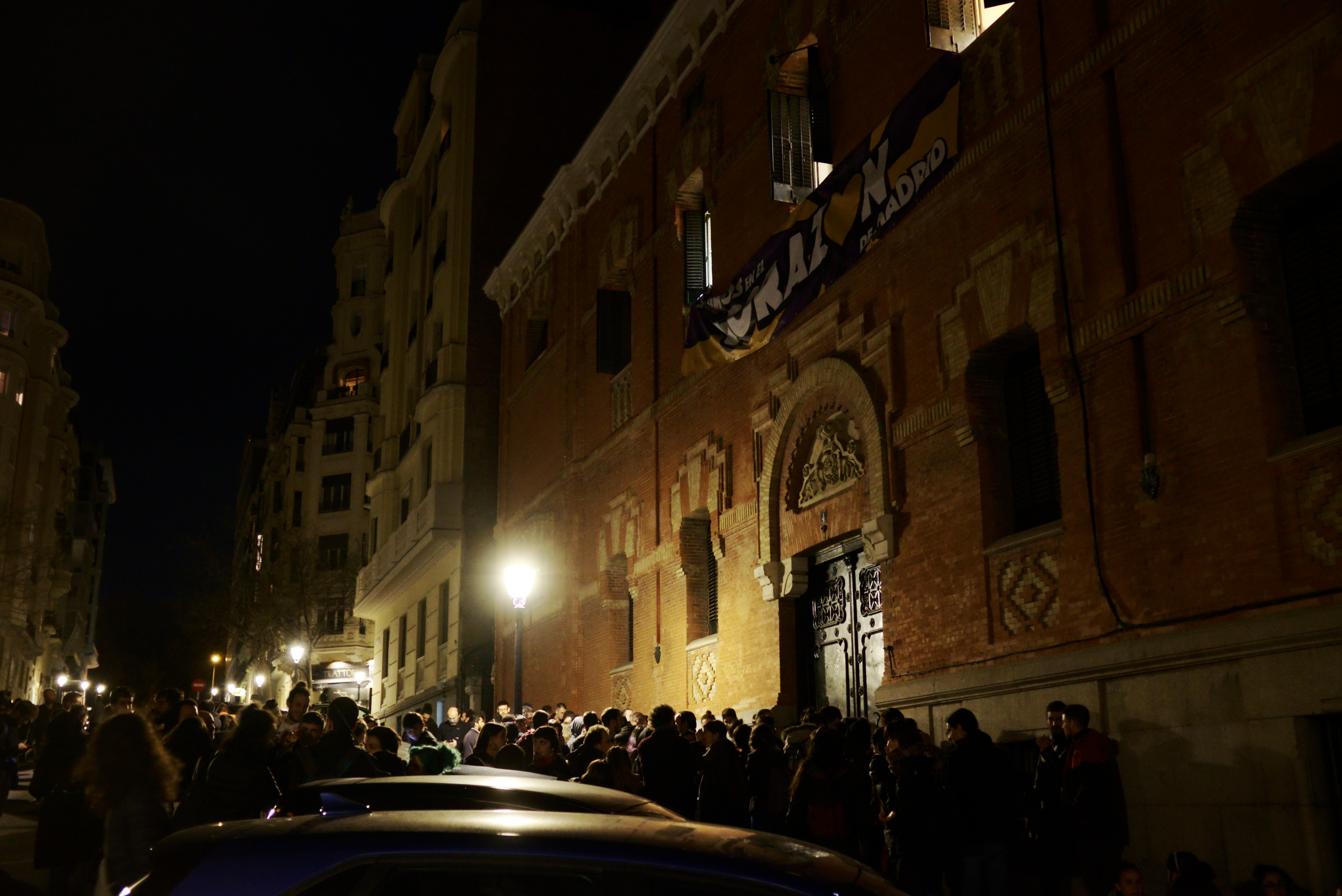
The new occupied building in calle Alberto Bosch

After a demonstration on 4 March 2020 which began in front of the Madrid Stock Exchange, La Ingobernable occupied a new building at Calle Alberto Bosch 4, behind the Prado Museum. The former Archivo General de Protocolos building was over 2000m³ and located in one of the most expensive residential areas in the city. It had been empty for five years and was owned by the Ministry of Justice. When the state of alarm began on 14 March because of the coronavirus pandemic, the ministry began an eviction process which La Ingobernable said it had been unable to participate in.

The notice of eviction was announced on 14 April, to occur within 48 hours. In the end, the building was evicted on 22 April 2020. There was nobody inside at the time and neighbours told the group the locks had been changed. La Ingobernable was only able to protest online on social media networks. After the eviction, the collective stated it was having internet meetings of 50 people and would squat a new building after the state of alarm was lifted, saying "La Ingobernable is a project which goes beyond a space".

== Calle Cruz ==
A new building was occupied in 2021 at Calle Cruz 5 in Madrid. Representatives of La Ingobernable stated they had opened an Office for Social Rights, to push for "common resistance and conquer new rights".

== See also ==
- Patio Maravillas
- La Tabacalera de Lavapiés
