= Can Masdeu =

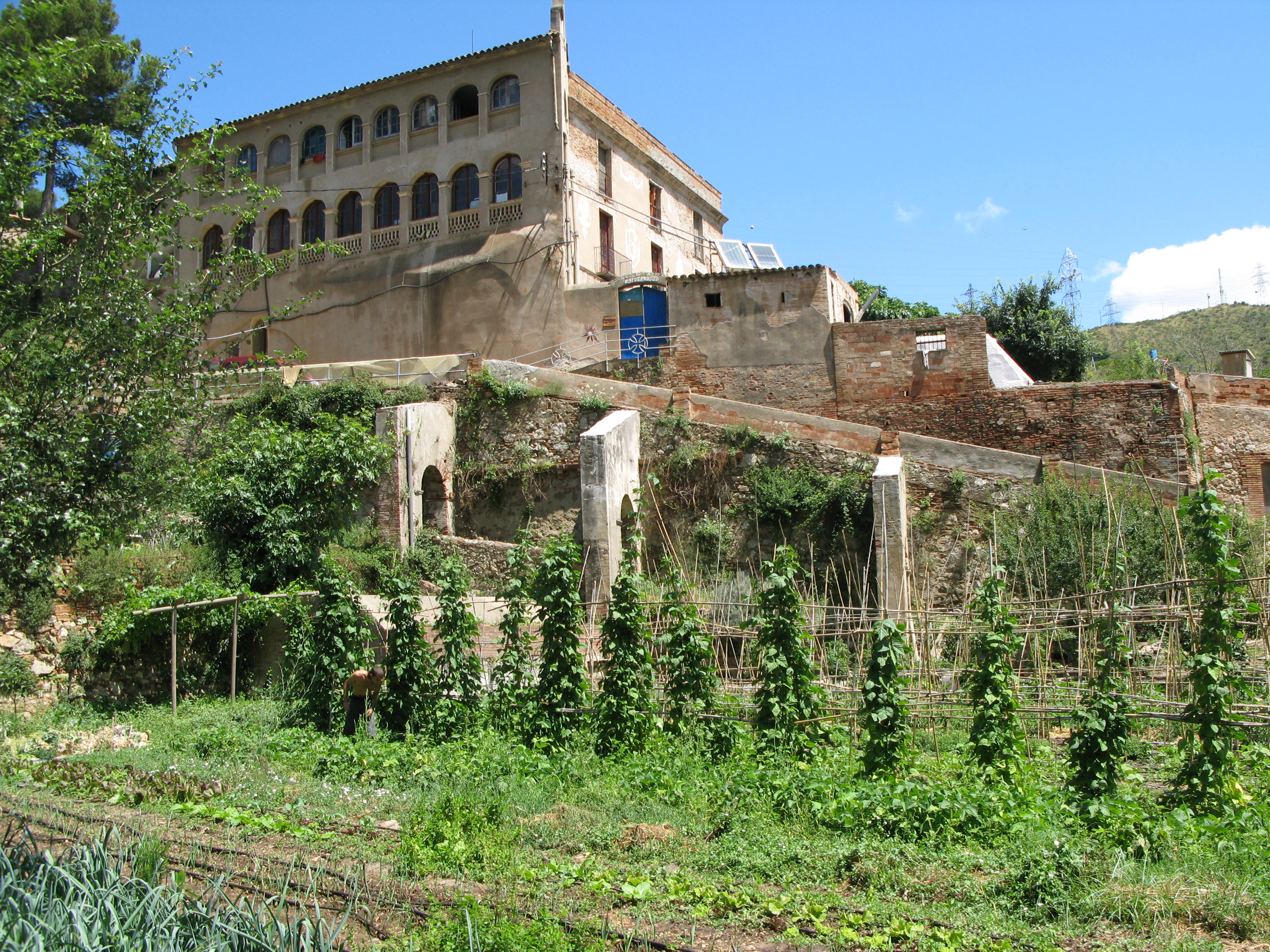
- Can Masdeu has some of the largest community gardens in Barcelona.

- Location within Catalonia Can Masdeu (Spain)

General information
- Location: Spain
- Coordinates: 41°26′44″N 2°9′27″E

Can Masdeu (Catalan pronunciation: [ˈkam məzˈðew]) is a squatted social centre, residence and community garden in the Collserola Park on the outskirts of Barcelona. The building, owned by Sant Pau hospital, was occupied by international activists in 2001 after being abandoned for roughly 53 years.

On most Sundays from late September to early June, there is an open house and guided tour in which residents explain community living, consensus-based decision-making, ecological gardening and living, and the functioning of the social center. There is a collective meal and around 100 people come up to participate in free activities related to ecology, activism, and self-sufficiency.

== The name Can Masdeu ==
Can means "property of" and "Masdeu" comes from the Masdeu family who once inhabited the farmhouse at the center of the valley. Thus, Can Masdeu can refer to any of the following:

- the masia - a traditional Iberian patriarchal mansion or plantation house
- the valley, or the community gardens which inhabit it
- the community of squatters
- the social center or the ecological project associated with it.
- the nunnery or leper hospital which once inhabited the masia and the valley.

== Grounds, location, and early history ==
The grounds governed by the squat include almost a hectare of land in use as gardens, an abandoned nunnery, and hospital facility, and about 15 hectares (37 acres) of mostly hilly forests. The building spans four floors and is draped over the side of a hill. It includes 24 different rooms of various sizes including a large hall.

Can Masdeu is located up the hill from the Canyelles L3 Metro station in Barcelona. There is a sign for it before the 0.5 km (0.31 mi) walk up a dirt road to the site.

The building was built on an ancient Roman site and was surrounded by vineyards before the city expanded into Nou Barris. Of the existing structure, first the temple (masia) was completed in the 17th century. In the early 20th century the living units, common space, and kitchen were added. After functioning as a nunnery for some years, the facility was converted into a leper hospital. It was ultimately shuttered and abandoned in 1948. Fear of leprosy may have been a factor in this large facility being left vacant for over half a century.

== Occupation and legal status ==
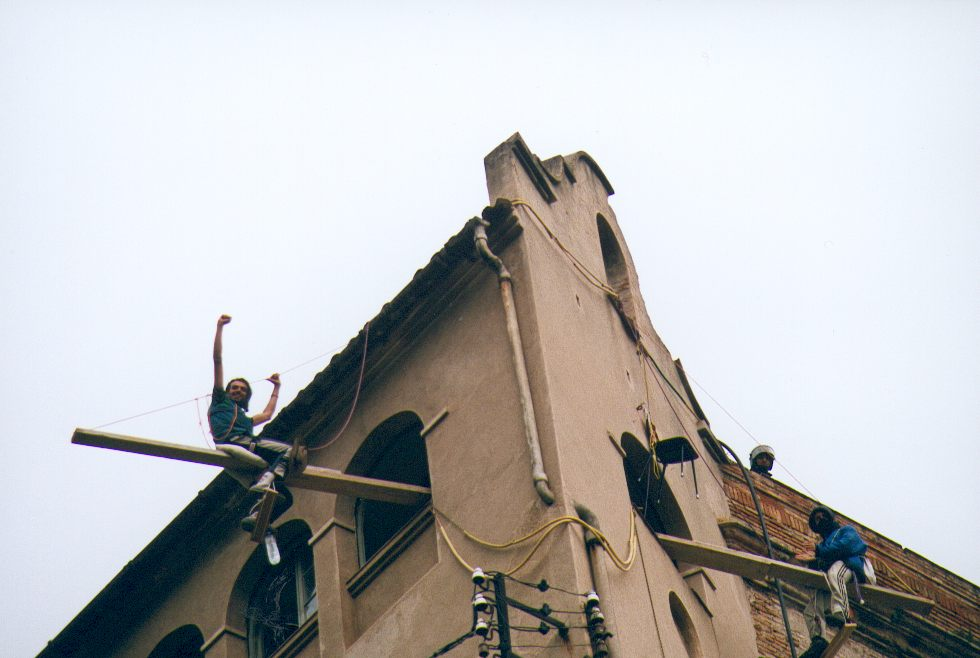
Two squatters balance on a "death plank" to resist the police eviction

An international group of activists spent over a year searching in Barcelona for the best location to occupy and in December 2001 they moved onto the abandoned hospital. The aim was to hold a conference to raise awareness around climate change. Can Masdeu became famous in April 2002, when over 100 national police came to evict 11 squatters. Using passive resistance over three days the squatters were able to hold off the police's efforts at forced removal. The squatters used a number of techniques to retain control of the space including, significantly, locking themselves to various precarious perches outside the building. This created a situation in which the police risked serious injury to themselves or to squatters in attempting to remove them. Some dangling occupiers locked themselves to the building, others balanced on a long seesaw, from which no single occupant could be removed without dropping the other. Many were suspended outside the building on frames and even a bathtub was used.

The police changed their initial strategy of forced removal with one of waiting for the squatters to get thirsty and hungry and come down. They waited for three days with growing local support and media attention. Hundreds of spectators came to see the occupation, many of them chanted slogans, and stopped traffic on the local highway. A Dutch solidarity organization organized an occupation of the Spanish Embassy in the Netherlands. After three days, the Barcelona judge overseeing the case ordered the police to withdraw.

The judge's ruling specified that human rights and safety are more important than property rights.

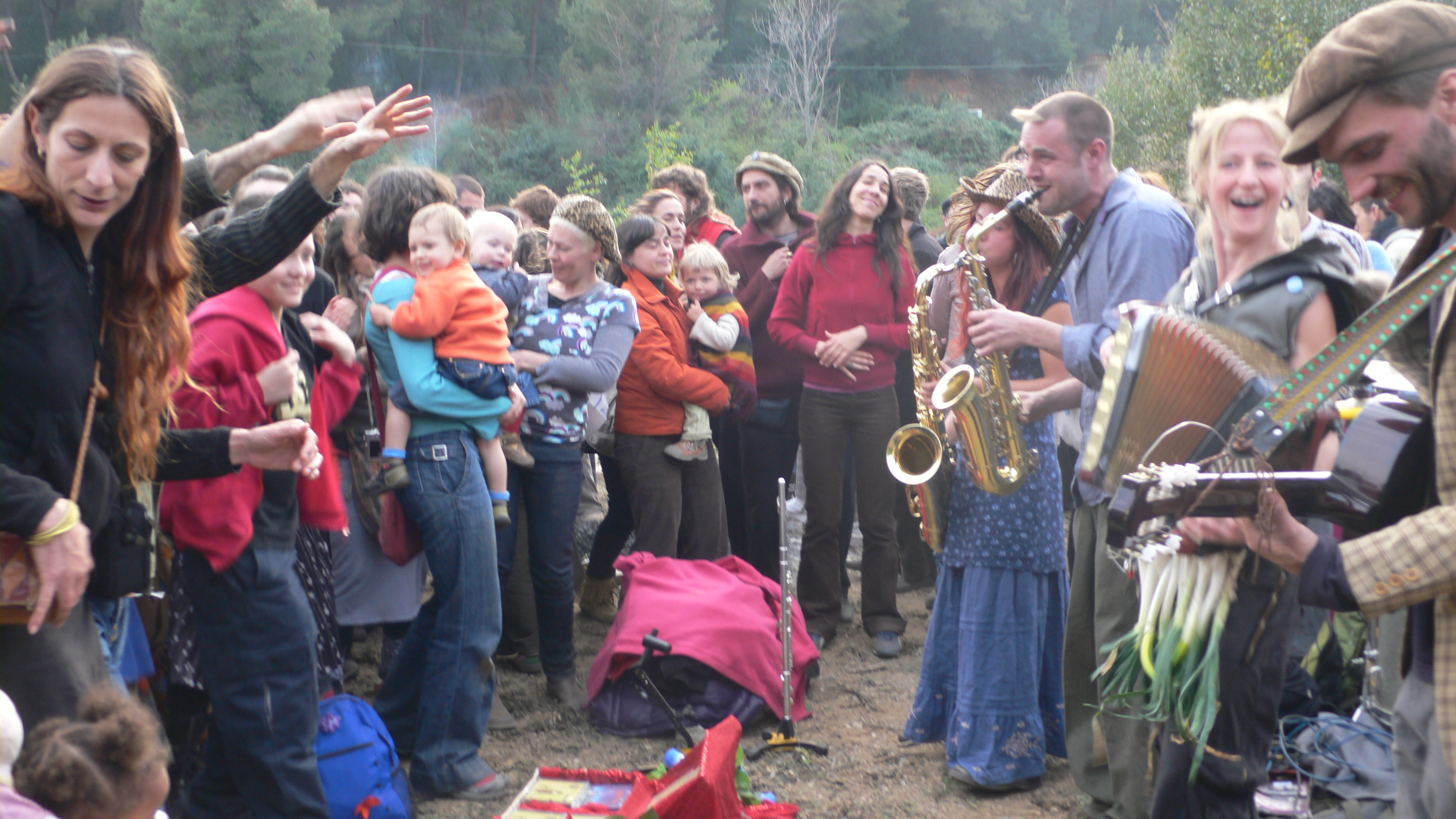
Members of the Barcelona band Gadjo playing at the Can Masdeu Calçotada - Spring 2007

There have been both civil and criminal cases brought against the occupants of Can Masdeu since 2002. Most of these cases have been lost by the community, but it continues to occupy the site, in part because the hospital that owns the facility does not have the financial capacity to renovate the structure. Further complicating the hospital's plans to provide a suitable reason for improving the Can Masdeu site is the fact that immediately next to it there is another larger abandoned institutional building, which could more easily be used than the more dilapidated older facility.

== Local relations ==
Relations with the surrounding local population have been a focus of the efforts of the residents of Can Masdeu. Immediately after the occupation, the community encouraged local gardeners to come plant on their gardens on the grounds. About a dozen people at first, mostly older women responded to the offer and began planting mostly produce and some flowers.

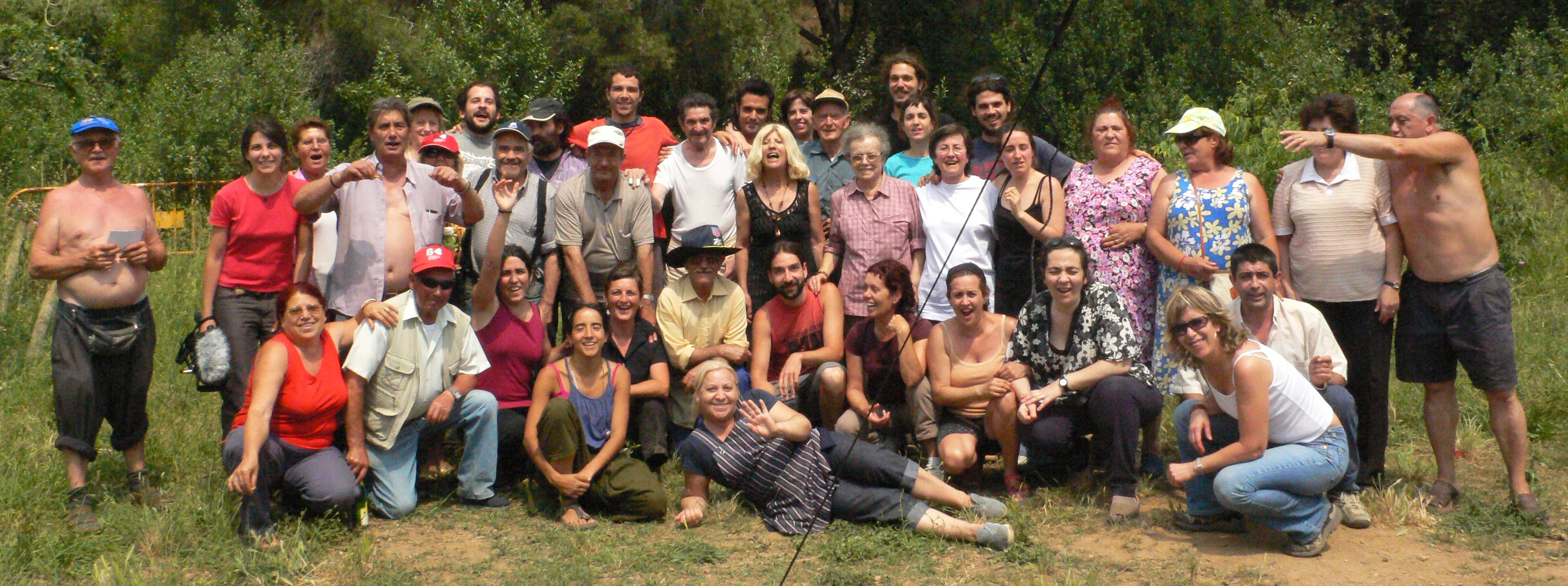
The Community Gardeners share duties, resources, and have parties together with live-in members of the community

The community hosts monthly or bi-monthly potlucks with local gardeners and there are regular meetings to manage the affairs of the garden. In 2006 a large second terrace of gardens was recovered from the surrounding bushlands and additional local gardens were planted. There are three tiers of gardens, the lowest in the new local gardens, the middle tier is the production garden for the community and the top tier is the original local gardens. These neighbors initially came from the Nou Barris district, but increasingly locals involved with these community gardens who move to nearby locations continue to come to this site and maintain their plots.

== Social centre activities ==
For most Sundays from late September to early June, there are public workshops offered in the social centre, the PIC, or Punt d'Interracció de Collserola. These workshops and presentations cover a variety of topics including:

- environmental issues
- permaculture and organic farming
- communities movement
- political resistance
- independent film presentations
- music, dancing, and cultural expression
- walking tours of the community grounds and building

An organic vegetarian meal served for around 5 euros.

The Social Centre and the 'Rurbar', a cafe serving local and organic meals and drinks, is open most Sundays from noon until evening. Activities are listed on the website, on the Facebook page, and in the Infousurpa newsletter.

== Renovations and functions ==
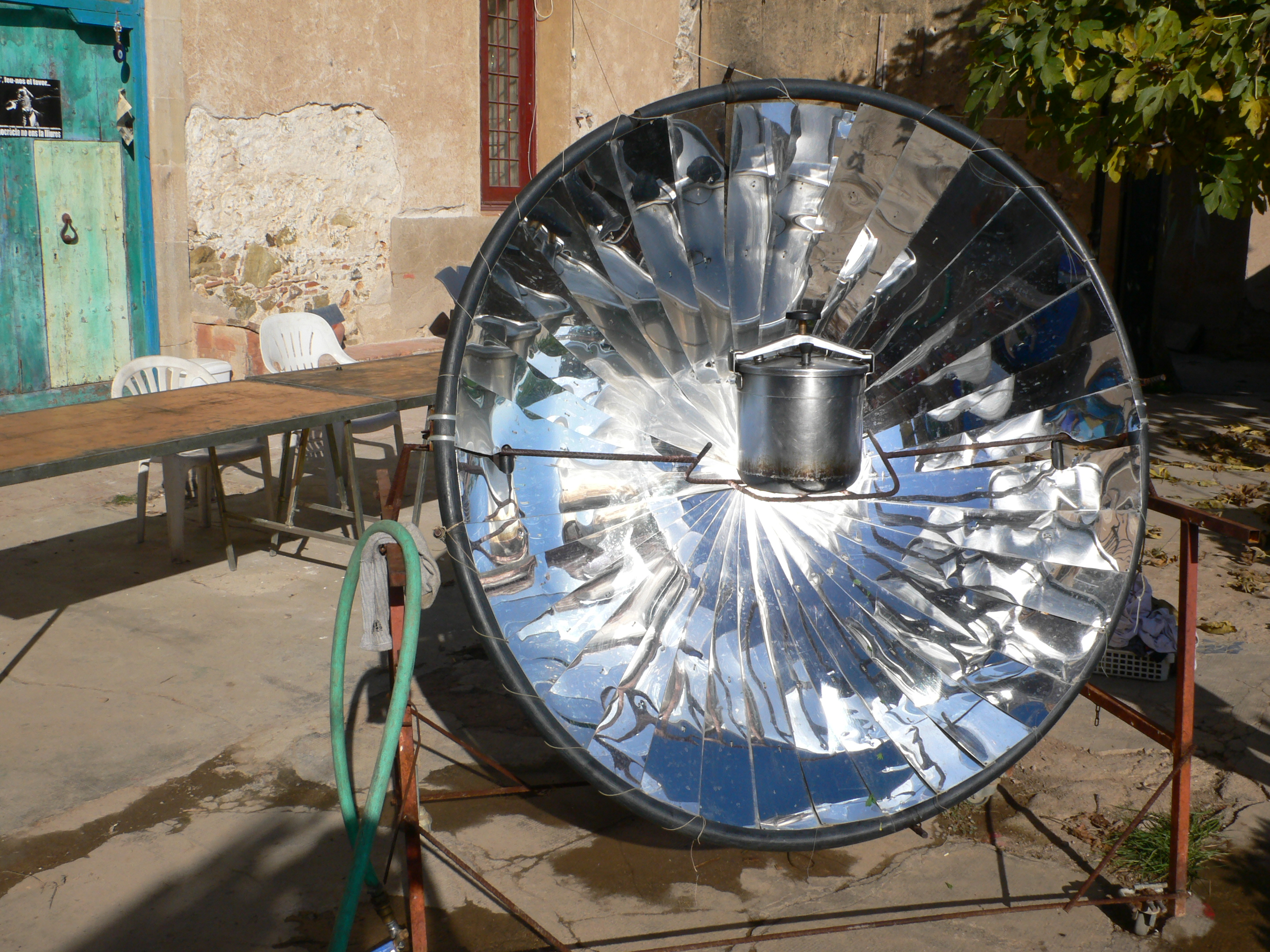
Solar energy is used to the maximum

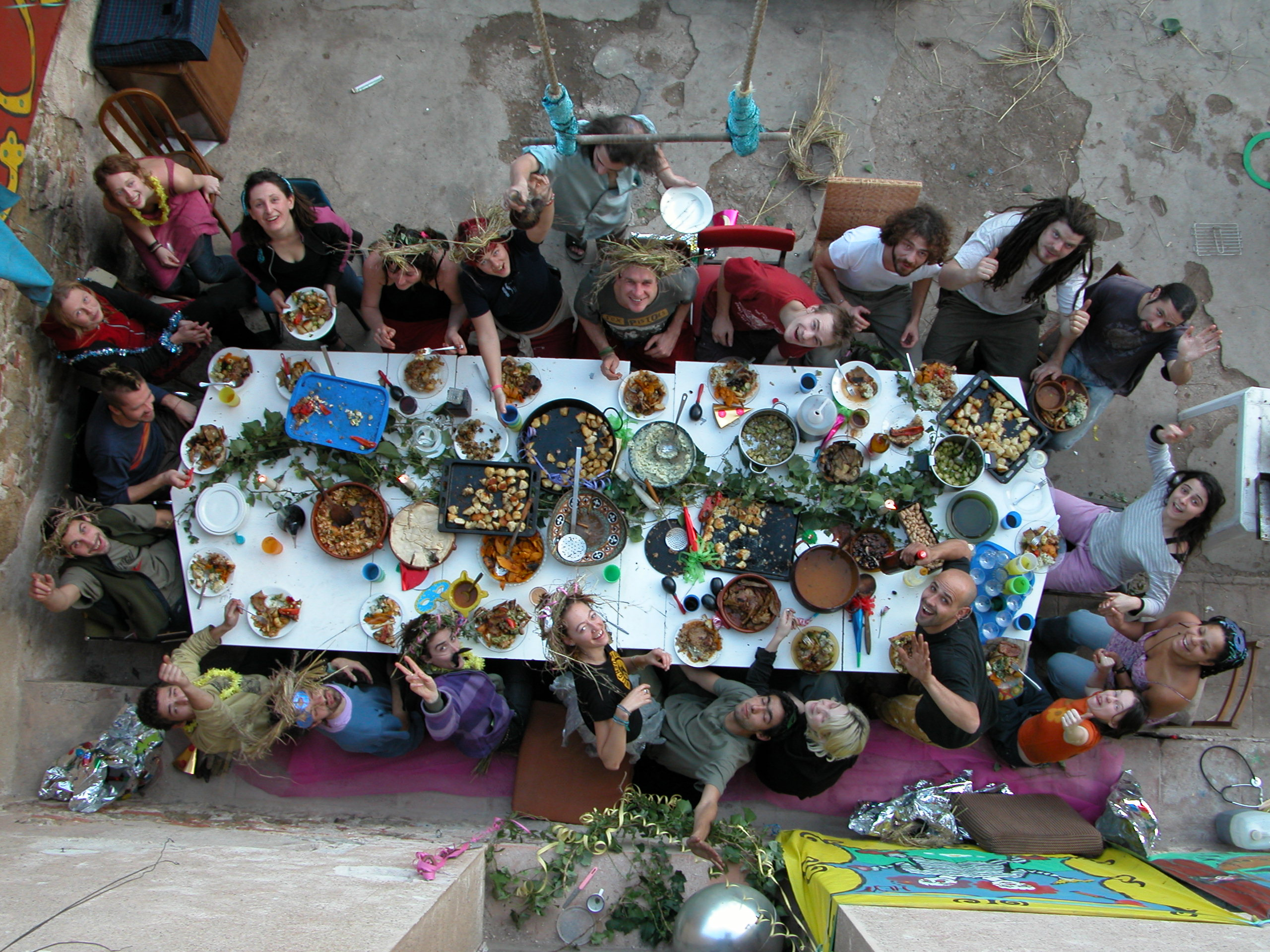
Lunch and dinner are communal.

A substantial renovation was necessary to make the space livable. Squatters cleared out rooms and repaired them and moved on to the adjacent space for a period of over 3 years. Residents enjoy low energy, low impact lifestyle with few low power electrical fixtures and a couple of woodstoves for the sprawling complex.

The community runs a bike shop and repair clinic, bakes bread for itself and local customers, provides space to the local high school for meetings and performances, and it also hosts meetings of progressive and resistance groups.

== Current status ==
As of 2018, 24 adults and 5 children live in and share the house. Community participation includes bi-weekly meetings, organic gardening, housework, and two collective meals per day, and each member contributes 100 euros/month to general costs. Many members work outside of the house, though there are cottage industries such as beer, floor chairs, herbal remedies, or organic catering. The working languages of the house are Catalan and Spanish, but as it is an international group, English, Italian, French, Basque, and Esperanto are also spoken.

The community hosts some guests who are either friends of the community or involved in service projects or movements that the community supports. The community receives far more requests to host people than it has the capacity to provide.

Unlike most squats and even intentional communities, Can Masdeu has quite low turn-over, with around one person leaving per year from 2013-2018.

== See also ==
- Consensus decision-making
- De-growth
- Direct Action
- Ecology
- Environmental movement
- Permaculture
- Social movement
- Squatting
