= List of self-managed social centers =

Self-managed social centers are community spaces which often feature music venues, infoshops, bicycle workshops and free schools. In French, they are termed espace autogéré and in Italian Centro Sociale Autogestito (CSA), or Centro Sociale Occupato Autogestito (CSOA) if squatted. These projects are concrete examples of Temporary Autonomous Zones.

== Centers ==
List of self-managed social centers
Name	Image	City	State	Duration	Status	Reference
1 in 12 Club	Exterior of building from side	Bradford	England	1988–	Ongoing	
121 Centre		London	England	1980s–1999	Former	
491 Gallery	491 Gallery front	London	England	2001–2013	Former	
56a Infoshop	56a sign	London	England	1991–	Ongoing	
ABC No Rio	Exterior of building	New York City	United States	1980–	Ongoing	
ACU	Exterior of building	Utrecht	Netherlands	1976–	Ongoing	
ADM	Entrance to site	Amsterdam	Netherlands	1997–2019	Former	
Albert Street Autonomous Zone	Exterior of building	Winnipeg	Canada	1995–	Ongoing	
ASCII	Building of ASCII	Amsterdam	Netherlands	1999–2006	Former	
Au		Frankfurt	Germany	1983–	Ongoing	
Autonomous Centre of Edinburgh		Edinburgh	Scotland	1997–	Ongoing	
Bank of Ideas	Banner on exterior of building	London	England	2011–2012	Former	
BASE		Bristol	England	1995–	Ongoing	
BIT		London	England	1968–1979	Former	
Binz	Entrance to site	Zürich	Switzerland	2006–2013	Former	
Blauwe Aanslag	Exterior of building	The Hague	Netherlands	1980–2003	Former	
Blitz	Exterior of building	Oslo	Norway	1982–	Ongoing	
Bloomsbury Social Centre	Exterior of building	London	England	2011–2011	Former	
Bluestockings	Exterior of bookstore	New York City	United States	1999–2025	Former	
Boxcar Books	Exterior of bookstore	Bloomington	United States	2001–2017	Former	
Brian MacKenzie Infoshop		Washington D.C.	United States	2003–2008	Former	
The Brick House	Exterior of building	Louisville	United States	1999–2008	Former	
Buridda	Exterior of building	Genoa	Italy	2003–2014, 2014–2024	Former	
Camas Bookstore and Infoshop	Exterior of building	Victoria	Canada	2007–	Ongoing	
Can Masdeu	Exterior of building	Barcelona	Catalonia	2001–	Ongoing	
Can Vies	Exterior of building	Barcelona	Catalonia	1997–	Ongoing	
Cascina Torchiera	Exterior of building	Milan	Italy	1992–	Ongoing	
Catalyst Infoshop	Exterior of building	Prescott	United States	2004–2010	Former	
Centre International de Recherches sur l'Anarchisme	Exterior of building	Lausanne	Switzerland	1957–	Ongoing	
Centro 73		Chişinău	Moldova	2010–2010	Former	
Centro Iberico		London	England	c. 1970s–1982	Former	
Chanti Ollin	View of building	Mexico City	Mexico	2003–2017	Former	
Ché Café	View of sign	San Diego	United States	1980–	Ongoing	
Civic Media Center	Exterior of building	Gainsville	United States	1992–	Ongoing	
Coffee Strong		Lakewood	United States	2008–2012	Former	
Common Ground Collective	Relief center	New Orleans	United States	2005–	Ongoing	
Conne Island	Skate park	Leipzig	Germany	1991–	Ongoing	
Cowley Club	Exterior of building	Brighton	England	2002–	Ongoing	
Cox 18	Door of building	Milan	Italy	1976–	Ongoing	
CSOA Forte Prenestino	Interior of corridor	Rome	Italy	1986–	Ongoing	
C-Squat	Sign	New York	United States	1989–	Ongoing	
DIY Space for London	Logo	London	England	2015–2020	Closed	
EKH	Exterior of building	Vienna	Austria	1990–	Ongoing	
Eskalera Karakola	Exterior of former building	Madrid	Spain	1996–	Ongoing	
Extrapool		Nijmegen	Netherlands	1991–	Ongoing	
Firestorm Books & Coffee		Asheville	United States	2008–	Ongoing	
Forest Café	Exterior of former building	Edinburgh	Scotland	2000–2022	Former	
Fort Thunder	Sign	Providence	United States	1995–2001	Former	
Freedom Press	Exterior of building	London	England	1886–	Ongoing	
Freedom Shop		Wellington	New Zealand	1995–	Ongoing	
Grote Broek	Exterior of former building	Nijmegen	Netherlands	1984–	Ongoing	
Hausmania	Exterior of building	Oslo	Norway	2000–	Ongoing	
Hirvitalo	Exterior of building	Tampere	Finland	2006–	Ongoing	
Ingobernable	First building, seen from demonstration	Madrid	Spain	2017–2019, 2020–2020	Former	
Internationalist Books	Exterior of building	Carrboro	United States	1981–2016	Former	
Iron Rail Book Collective	Exterior of building	New Orleans	United States	2003–2012	Former	
Jura Books	Exterior of building	Sydney	Australia	1977–	Ongoing	
Kafé 44	Front door of project	Stockholm	Sweden	1976–	Ongoing	
Kasa de la Muntanya	Exterior of building	Barcelona	Catalonia	1989–	Ongoing	
Klinika	Exterior of building	Prague	Czech Republic	2014–2019	Former	
Køpi	Exterior of building	Berlin	Germany	1990–	Ongoing	
Kulturzentrum Bremgarten	Exterior of building	Bremgarten	Switzerland	1990–	Ongoing	
Kulturzentrum Reitschule	Exterior of building	Bern	Switzerland	1980s–	Ongoing	
Kukutza	Exterior of building	Bilbao	Basque Country	1996–1996, 1998–1998, 1998–2011	Former	
Ladronka	Exterior of redeveloped building	Prague	Czech Republic	1993–2000	Former	
Landbouwbelang	Exterior of building	Maastricht	Netherlands	2002–	Ongoing	
Leoncavallo		Milan	Italy	1975–2025	Former	
Lepakko	Lepakko in August 1979	Helsinki	Finland	1979-1999	Evicted	
London Action Resource Centre		London	England	1999-	Ongoing	
London Queer Social Centre	The pub squatted as the third centre	London	England	2012–2014 (four locations)	Evicted	
Lucy Parsons Center	Exterior of building	Boston	United States	1992–	Ongoing	
Metelkova	Alt=Exterior of building on terrain	Ljubljana	Slovenia	1993–	Ongoing	
Milada	Exterior of building	Prague	Czech Republic	1997–2009	Former	
Noisebridge	Interior of building during a hacklab	San Francisco	United States	2007–	Ongoing	
OCCII	Exterior of building	Amsterdam	Netherlands	1984–	Ongoing	
Okupa Che		Mexico City	Mexico	2000–	Ongoing	
OT301	Exterior of building	Amsterdam	Netherlands	1999–	Ongoing	
Patio Maravillas	Exterior of building	Madrid	Spain	2007–2010, 2010–2015, 2015–2015	Former	
Poortgebouw	Exterior of building	Rotterdam	Netherlands	1980–	Ongoing	
Qilombo		West Oakland, California	United States	2011–2019	Former	
rampART		London	England	2004–2009	Former	
Really Free School	Exterior of building	London	England	2011	Former	
Red and Black Cafe	Exterior of building	Portland	United States	2000–2015	Former	
Red Emma's	Exterior of building	Baltimore	United States	2004–	Ongoing	
RHINO	Exterior of building	Geneva	Switzerland	1988–2007	Former	
Rog	Logo	Ljubljana	Slovenia	2006–2021	Former	
Rote Flora	Exterior of building	Hamburg	Germany	1989–	Ongoing	
Rozbrat	Logo	Poznań	Poland	1994–	Ongoing	
Salon Mazal		Tel Aviv	Israel	2000s	Former	
Seomra Spraoi	Logo	Dublin	Ireland	2004–2015	Former	
Spartacus Books	Exterior of building	Vancouver	Canada	1973–	Ongoing	
Spike Surplus Scheme		London	England	1999–2009	Former	
St Agnes Place	Street	London	England	1969–2005	Former	
Sumac Centre	Exterior of building	Nottingham	England	1984–	Ongoing	
Syndikalistiskt Forum		Gothenburg	Sweden	1980–	Ongoing	
Tabacalera de Lavapiés	Interior of project	Madrid	Spain	2010–	Ongoing	
Trotz Allem	Interior of centre	Witten	Germany	1999–2005, 2006–2006, 2010–	Ongoing	
Turun Kirjakahvila	Interior of building	Turku	Finland	1981–	Ongoing	
Ubica	Exterior of building	Utrecht	Netherlands	1992–2013	Former	
UFFA		Trondheim	Norway	1981–	Ongoing	
Ungdomshuset	Exterior of first building	Copenhagen	Denmark	1982–2007, 2008–	Ongoing	
Valreep		Amsterdam	Netherlands	2011–2014	Former	
Villa Amalia	Exterior of building	Athens	Greece	1990–2012	Former	
Vloek	Exterior of building	The Hague	Netherlands	2002–2015	Former	
Vrankrijk	Exterior of building	Amsterdam	Netherlands	1982–	Ongoing	
Vrijplaats Koppenhinksteeg	Exterior of building	Leiden	Netherlands	1968–2010	Former	
Wapping Autonomy Centre		London	England	1981–1982	Former	
Warzone Centre		Belfast	Northern Ireland	1986–2003, 2011-2018	Former	

== See also ==
- Self-managed social centers in Italy
- Self-managed social centers in the United Kingdom
