= Self-managed social centres in Italy =

Self-organised autonomous projects in Italy

Self-managed social centres (Italian: centri sociali autogestiti, CSA; centri sociali occupati autogestiti, CSOA; or simply centri sociali) exist in many cities in Italy. They are part of different left-wing political networks including anarchist, communist, socialist, and autonomist. The centres tend to be squatted and provide self-organised, self-financing spaces for alternative and noncommercial activities such as concerts, exhibitions, farmers' markets, infoshops, and migrant initiatives. Over time, some but not all projects have opted to legalize their status.

== History ==
Self-managed social centres were first occupied in the mid-1970s in cities such as Milan by groups of young people, both students and unemployed. The social centres in Milan were used for diverse activities such as concerts, films, yoga classes, discussion groups and counselling for drug addicts.

They often affiliated themselves with Autonomia Operaia (Workers' Autonomy) and suffered when social movements were repressed following the Years of Lead. A second wave of social centres began in the late 1980s and early 1990s, with more than 100 projects spread across the country. Two factors which helped the wave spread were the well-publicised eviction resistance (and subsequent resquat) of Leoncavallo in Milan and the Panther student movement.

What linked these political and cultural projects was that they were squatted, their focus on self-management and self-financing, and the use of the space as a social venue for the local community. The differences tended to stem from whether the project was primarily anarchist, autonomist, communist, or without ideology. This then resulted in a later debate about whether to legalize spaces or not. Legalization denoted two things: firstly, the formation of an association so that the squatter collective could have a legal form; secondly, setting up a rental contract between the city and the project.

From 1993 onwards, some squats began legalization processes and others did not. The social centres which did legalize successfully then changed their title from 'CSOA' (Italian: Centro Sociale Occupato Autogestito – Self-Managed Squatted Social Centre), to 'CSA' (Italian: Centro Sociale Autogestito – Self-Managed Social Centre). Owing to these changes, there is no longer just one network of social centres, but several disparate ones. The institutionalized centres such as Leoncavallo then became associated with the Tute Bianche (White Overalls) movement of the late 1990s.

Legalization can create problems, since forming an association imposes hierarchy on a previously horizontally organized collective and also contracts tend to be for a fixed time period and can be hard to renew. Therefore, in the 2010s, some projects such as Teatro Valle Occupato (Rome), XM24 (Bologna), and Macao (Milan), have attempted to promote new, more flexible forms of legalization, with varying degrees of success.

Social centres provide cheap DIY venues for many alternative forms of music, including punk and Italian hardcore. They have also provided a fertile breeding ground for homegrown Italian hip-hop. In the 1990s, the rap group Assalti Frontali built a recording studio at Forte Prenestino and 99 Posse were associated with Officina 99 in Naples. The presence of a local university tends to be a factor in the creation of a social centre.

From small numbers of social centres in the 1980s, in the 1990s there were around 120. By 2006, it was estimated there were 150 across the entire country, with many clustered in Milan, Rome, and Turin.

== Bologna ==
Bologna has a reputation for being a centre of left-wing activism, but this has changed as the city gentrified. Atlantide was occupied in 1998 by Tute Bianche activists and was the last self-managed space in the centre of the city, used by many groups, including Antagonismo Gay (gay separatists), Quelle Che Non Ci Stanno (feminist and lesbian separatists), NullaOsta (punks), and from 2008, Laboratorio Smaschieramenti (trans*-feminist-queer). It was evicted on 9 October 2015 by the order of Mayor Virginio Merola. Làbas was occupied in 2012. Young people worked as volunteers to create various projects, such as a vegetable garden, an organic pizzeria, a bike repair workshop, a microbrewery producing organic beer, a volunteer-run creche, and a dormitory for migrants, refugees, and homeless people. The project was evicted in 2017.

XM24 is a social centre which has existed since 2002, although its roots come from an earlier squatted social centre. 'XM' means 'Ex Market' (Italian: Ex Mercato) and it is located at number 24 on Via Aristotile Fioravanti. Activities include the People's Kitchen (a vegan café), the Ampioraggio People's Bike Shop, and the People's Free Gym. It is run by a general assembly which meets every Tuesday. The three defining characteristics of the space are antifascist activism, support for migrant initiatives, and collective self-management. Events such as 'Anti-MTVday,' a farmers' market, and meetings of the Critical Wine network have all been held at the centre. Famous street artist Blu has been connected with the centre since its beginning and supported it in the fight against eviction by painting a huge mural on a neighbouring building which was scheduled to be demolished. The mural was later covered up by Blu in 2016, in order to protest the city council organising an exhibition called 'Street Art: Banksy & Co: L'Arte allo Stato Urbano,' which used Blu's works without permission.

XM24 was evicted on 6 August 2019. The eviction was resisted, but the protest was called off when negotiations with the city for a new building were successful. The council undertook to provide a new building by 15 November. When this did not happen, the XM24 collective occupied a derelict barracks. The council responded by announcing a plan to demolish the barracks and to build a park.

== Genoa ==
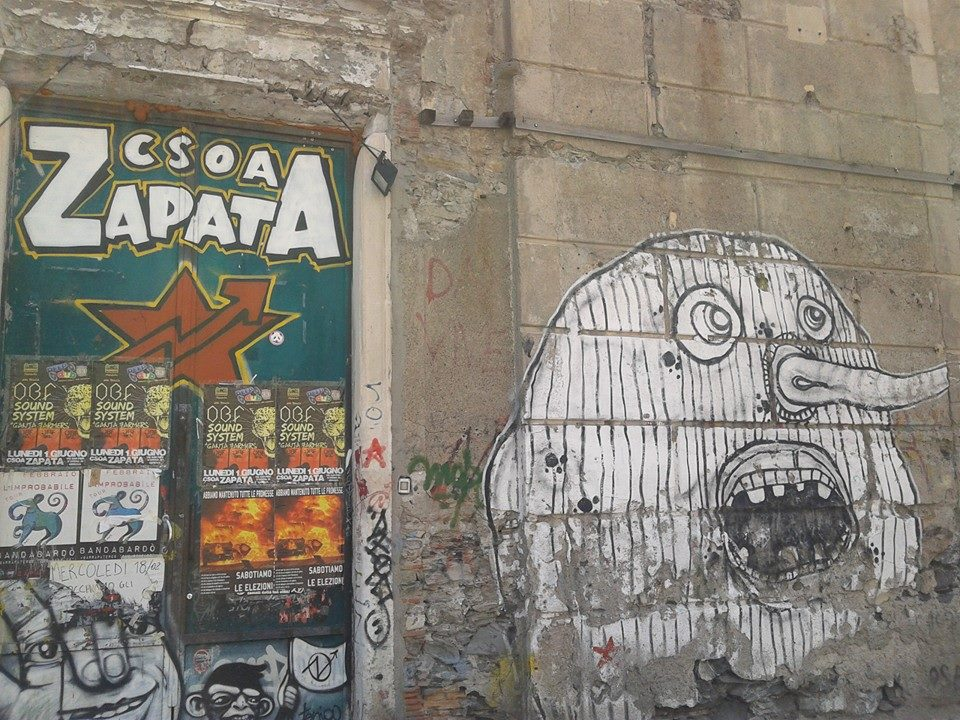
Entrance to Zapata social centre in Genoa, 2015

Genoa's LSOA Buridda, first squatted in 2003, offered open space for exercise, sports, art workshops, and other cultural events. It was raided and evicted on 30 July 2024.

== Milan ==
The self-managed Leoncavallo social centre was first occupied in 1975. The still-extant centre defines itself as of 2019 as 'Leoncavallo Self-Managed Public Space' (Italian: Leoncavallo Spazio Pubblico Autogestito). The Cox 18 social centre was born in 1988 in a building squatted in 1976. It is a three-storey complex located at Conchetta 18, in Porta Ticinese. Its influences were originally punk, trade unionism, and Calusca, the last being a local libertarian bookshop and library which then became based at the project. When the neighbours in the street made complaints about drug use and noise, the centre was evicted in 1989. It was resquatted, violently evicted, and then reoccupied again. Cox 18 concentrated efforts on making links with the neighbourhood and this ensured its survival. The T28 social centre was squatted in 1975 and houses the Ambulatorio Medico Popolare, a free medical clinic that had treated over 5,000 people by 2018.

A group called 'The Art Workers' (Italian: Lavoratori dell'arte) first occupied the Galfa Tower for 10 days under the name Macao. Next, they squatted the Palazzo Cittiero in the Brera district before being evicted, and afterwards they squatted a former slaughterhouse in Calvairate in June 2012. Over five years until 2017, Macao hosted 2,000 artists making exhibitions, talks, workshops, and musical events. They also held assemblies and ran seminars on the theme of the fair treatment of cultural workers. In 2017, the city council decided it wanted to sell the complex of buildings known as Ortomercato (which includes the Macao site) for redevelopment. Macao asked to be able to buy the building for themselves. The group submitted a proposal endorsed by the German Mietshäuser Syndikat.

== Naples ==
CSOA Officina 99 in Gianturco, Naples, was first occupied in December 1990, but quickly evicted. It was then reoccupied in May 1991 by 500 people. The people were from different groups such as homeless and migrant, of all ages. The occupation built upon a previous occupation in 1986, which had lasted six months. Officina refuses any form of legalization and is critical of centres such as Leoncavallo, which have chosen to legalize.

As of 1999, other social centres in Naples included Lo Ska (Laboratorio Occupato di Sperimentazione e Kultura Antagonista) and DAMM (Diego Armando Maradona Montesanto). Around 2012, a social centre called Mezzocannone Occupato was formed. The Power to the People political party formed in 2017 as a left-wing coalition that included some social centres, such as the Neapolitan "Je so' pazzo" Ex OPG ("I am crazy" Ex Asylum) social centre.

== Rome ==
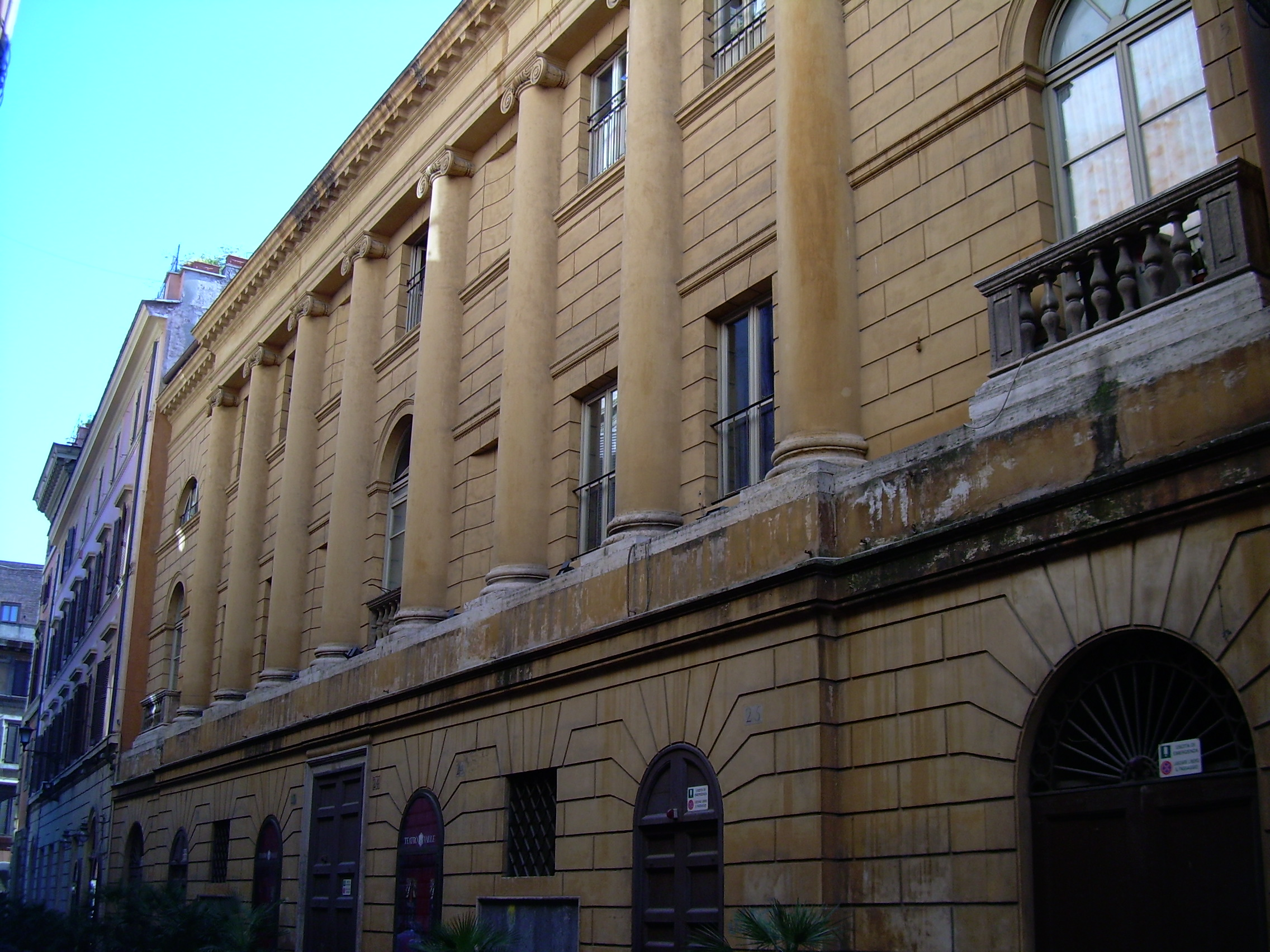
Teatro Valle in Rome

The first social centre in Rome was Hai Visto Quinto, created in 1985. Others in this time were Alice nella città, Blitz, Break Out, Ricomincio dal Faro, Intifada, and Zona Rischio. As of 2014, Rome had many social centre projects, including Acrobax, Angelomai Altrove, Cinema America Occupato, Nuovo Cinema Palazzo, and Teatro Valle Occupato. Metropoliz is a refugee squat occupied in 2009 that took the unusual step of opening a contemporary art gallery in 2012 as a means for the artists to support the squatters. CSOA Forte Prenestino is an old fort in Rome which was squatted on 1 May 1986. It is a huge site which hosts a range of projects.

CSOA Corto Circuito was a long-running social centre. It was squatted in 1990 and evicted in 2016. Over its lifetime, it experienced two fires, one in 1991 in which a 21-year-old activist, Auro Bruni, lost his life, and one in 2012 which destroyed one of the buildings of the centre. The squatters therefore rebuilt the structure, using permaculture principles. They did not get the correct permits and the authorities used this as a reason to evict. The eviction operation sealed off the neighbourhood and featured 200 police agents and carabinieri, 50 municipal police, and 3 fire brigade teams.

== Turin ==
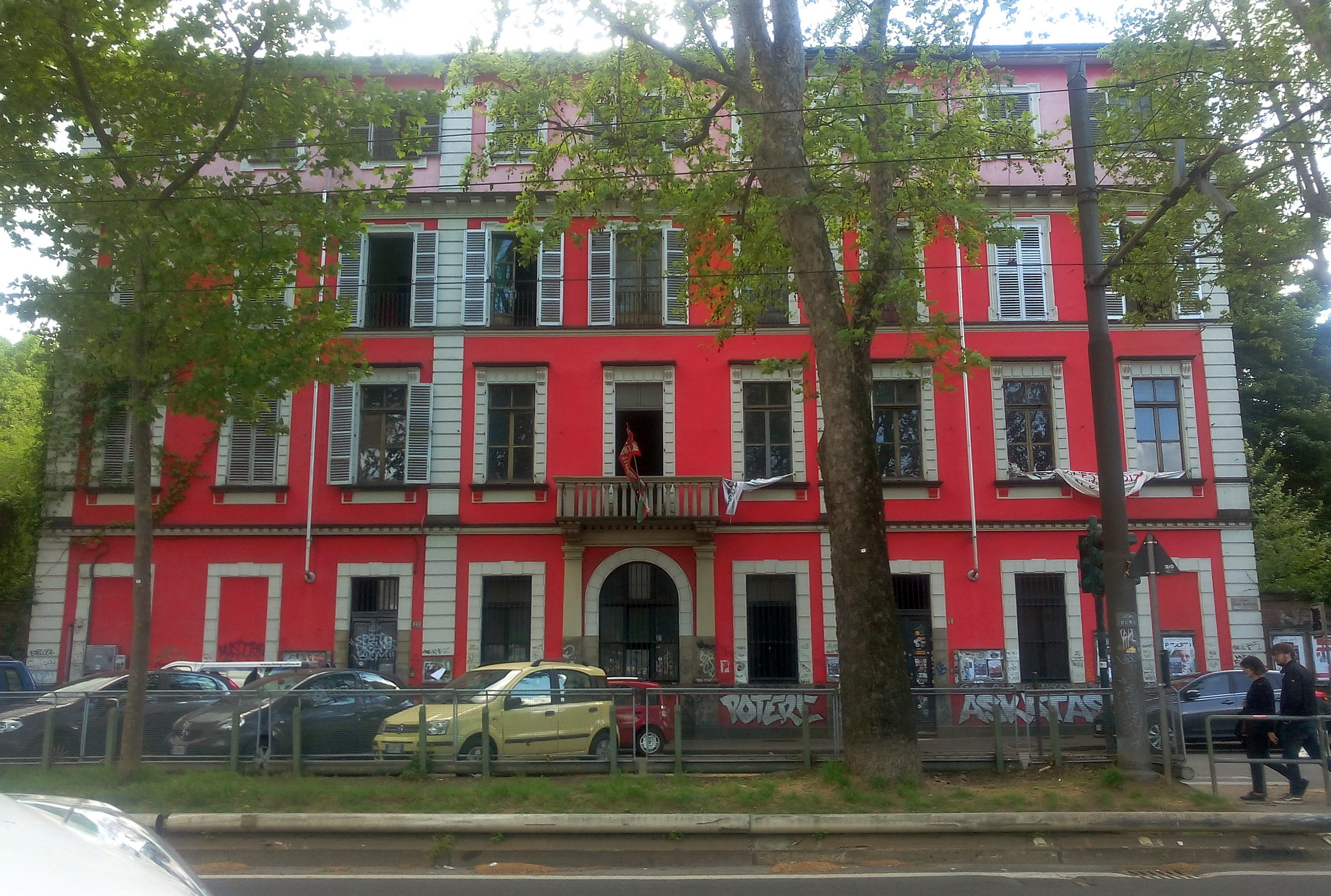
Askatasuna social centre in Turin, 2016

The Askatasuna social centre in Turin was founded in 1996, named after the Basque word for "freedom". In December 2025, local police carried out an operation to evict its occupants and shut the centre down. The mayor of Turin said that the eviction took place due to the presence of six people who were sleeping in the building during a police search, a violation of the centre's legalization process, despite the dispatch of 300 police officers to the city before this discovery. In December 2025 and January 2026, riots broke out in the city during marches in support of Askatasuna, after the city had cordoned it off. During the January event, two police officers were injured, as law enforcement was assaulted with objects including hammers, Molotov cocktails, nail-filled paper bombs, and stones thrown from catapults. The handling of the clashes was criticised due to the deployment of untrained officers and the violence used by the police against journalists, photographers, and protesters, even peaceful ones.

== See also ==
- List of self-managed social centers
- Self-managed social centres in the United Kingdom
