= ASCII (disambiguation) =

ASCII, the American Standard Code for Information Interchange.

ASCII may also refer to:

- ASCII Corporation, a Japanese publisher later merged to ASCII Media Works and Enterbrain
- ASCII (magazine), a Japanese personal computer magazine
- ASCII (squat), Dutch computing project
- ASCII, asteroid 3568 ASCII
- ASCII, the second release of Linux distribution Devuan

== See also ==
- Extended ASCII
- ASCII art
- ASCII game, text-based game
- ASCII armor, redirects to binary-to-text encoding
- Arthur Askey
