= Grote Broek =

Self-managed political project in Nijmegen, the Netherlands

De Grote Broek
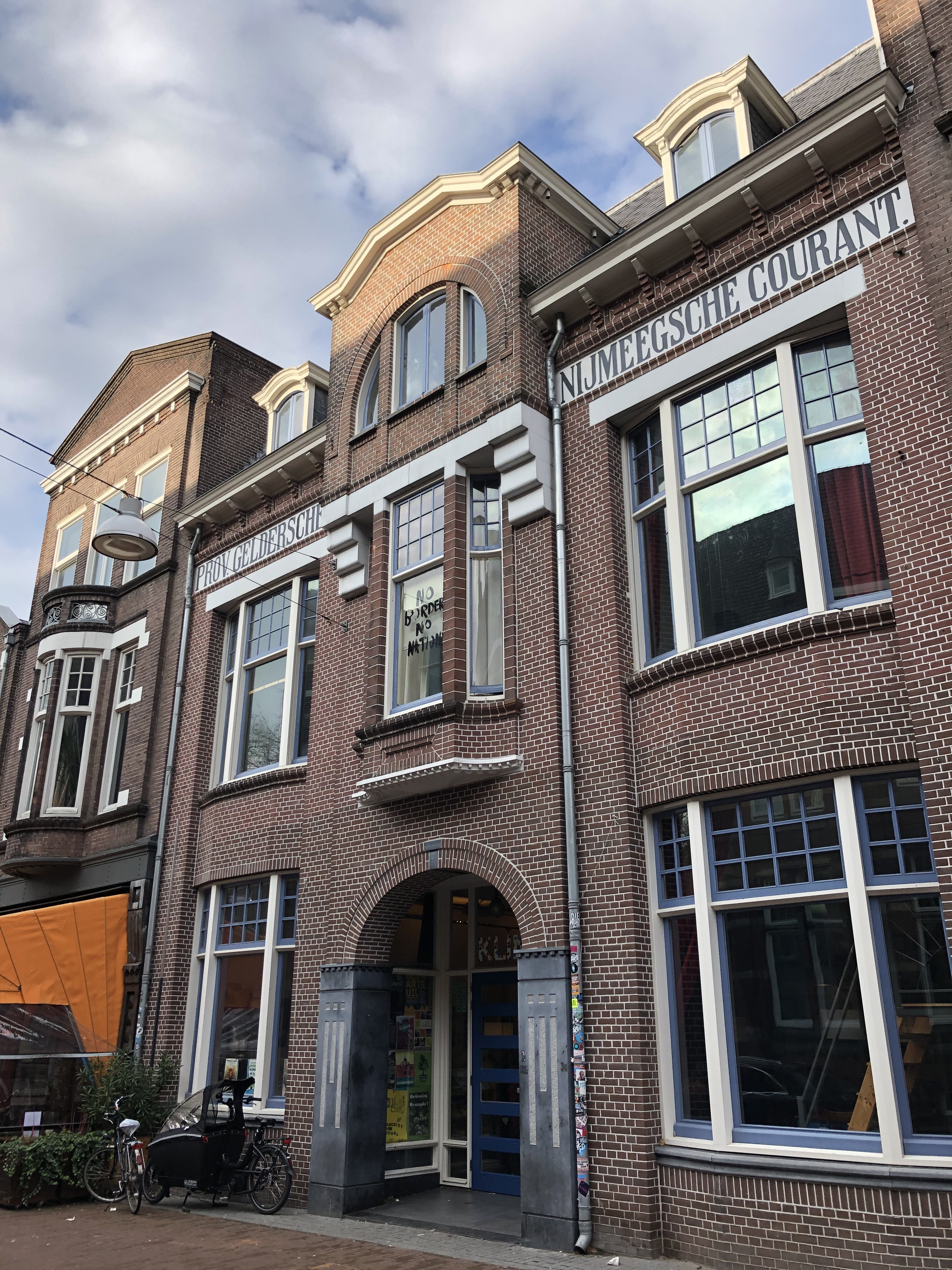
- Grote Broek from front
- Interactive map of De Grote Broek
- Former names: De Grote Karel
- Address: Van Broeckhuysenstraat 46, 6511 PK
- Location: Nijmegen
- Coordinates: 51.8438°N 5.8660°E
- Type: Social centre

Website
- grotebroek.nl

De Grote Broek (English: The Big Trousers) is a legalised squat and self-managed social centre in central Nijmegen in the Netherlands. It was occupied in 1984 and legalised from 2002 onwards. It spans two sides of a city block and has entrances on both Van Broeckhuysenstraat and Tweede Walstraat. The project consists of two separate housing co-operatives living above a cafe on one side and Extrapool and a music venue on the other. Groups with shared political objectives are hosted at the centre.

== History of building ==
The building was first used by two newspapers, the Provinciale Geldersche and the Nijmeegsche Courant. Afterwards it was a furniture shop before becoming derelict in the 1980s.

== Occupation ==
De Grote Broek was squatted on November 4, 1984. At first it was called De Grote Karel (English: the Big Karel) after the owner's name. The name later became De Grote Broek since one side of the block is on Van Broeckhuysenstraat. One resident was Louis Sévèke.

== Legalisation ==
Following the death of the owner in 2002, the city of Nijmegen bought the building and a legalisation process began. Negotiations were made between the occupiers and a housing corporation, Standvast Wonen. The squatters therefore became renters and the renovations were completed in 2009.

== Activities ==
- The cafe is called De Klinker and serves vegan food. It actually began in another squat in the 1970s. There is also an anarchist library called De Zwarte Uil (English: The Black Owl).
- The venue is called De Onderbroek (English: The Underpants). It is located in the basement and hosts a variety of events, including punk and hardcore gigs. It is running since 1986.
- Extrapool is an artist-run initiative.
- Anarchist Black Cross Nijmegen.
- Stichting Gast works with migrants.
- Stichting Straatmensen works with homeless people.

== Recent events ==
The Grote Broek celebrated 30 years of existence in November 2014.

In 2018, an extreme right group was offended by the Grote Broek organising a 'Refugees Welcome' picnic. The group demonstrated for the closure of the centre, which they termed "a violent breeding ground for extreme leftism".

In the same time period there were also scuffles outside the Grote Broek between right wing supporters of Zwarte Piet celebrations and leftwingers who see it as racism.

In 2019, someone was arrested near the Grote Broek and charged with making a death threat against politician Thierry Baudet because the previous day she had been at a demonstration in Amsterdam and had sung "If you want to shoot Thierry dead say pow!" (Dutch: Als je Thierry dood wil schieten, zeg dan paf!).

In 2026, De Grote Broek announced a project to purchase the building for 1.7 million euros, of which 1 million in loans.

== See also ==
- Landbouwbelang
- Vrankrijk
- Vrijplaats Koppenhinksteeg
- Anarchism in the Netherlands
