= Web 2.0 Suicide Machine =

Web service

The Web 2.0 Suicide Machine is a service that automatically removes private content and friends on social media platforms MySpace, LinkedIn and Twitter, to "commit suicide in social networks", without deleting or deactivating their accounts. The service is part of the non-profit foundation WORM, based in Rotterdam, Netherlands.

The "Web 2.0 Suicide Machine" has, as of January 2010, assisted with more than 1,000 'virtual deaths', ending more than 80,500 friendships on Facebook and removing 276,000 tweets from Twitter.

== Functionality ==
Rather than deleting user accounts, it removes private content and friendships. To start the deletion process, the user has to provide their login credential for the social network from which they want to be deleted, and then "watch your life passing by and reflect upon your real & virtual friends", while private content and friend relationships are removed. In the end the user is included in a memorial album of all the suicides, with their profile picture, their name and their "last words".

== Capabilities ==
"Web 2.0 Suicide Machine" has listed the functions of which the service is capable thus far as the following:

The Facebook option is no longer available on Web 2.0 Suicide Machine as Facebook sent a cease and desist (C&D) letter on January 6, 2010, demanding that the website stop their actions.

LinkedIn

- Logging into your account
- Changing your password and your profile picture
- Removing all your business connections
- Logging out

Myspace

- Logging into your account
- Removing all your friends
- Leaving a status message that you've committed suicide
- Logging out

Twitter

- Logging into your account
- Changing your password and your profile picture
- Removing all people you follow
- Removing all your followers
- Removing all your tweets
- Logging out

== Controversy ==
In January 2010, Facebook blocked the service for a short time and sent a cease and desist letter from its lawyers. The service remained up and running, but the website has since ceased operation. Its creators "consider this project as a piece of socio-political net art".

== See also ==
- Internet relationship
- Net art
- Panopticon
