= Syndikalistiskt Forum =

- Formation: 1980
- Founded at: Sprängkullen
- Type: Self-managed social centre
- Location: Gothenburg, Sweden
- Coordinates: 57.6964°N 11.9506°E
- Website: syndikalistisktforum.se

Syndikalistiskt Forum is a self-managed social centre in Gothenburg, Sweden. It was founded in 1980, at the Sprängkullen social centre. It moved to the Landsvägatan and then the Folkets hus. Between 2012 and 2018, it was based at Övre Husargatan 27, where it had a café, infoshop and library. It is now located at Linnégatan 21 in the Viktoriahuset.

In 2014, the Forum organised a free week-long film festival at the same time as the Gothenburg Film Festival. Groups such as Planka.nu, Allt åt alla, Solgruppen Göteborg and Gothenburg feminists organised evenings. On 11 November 2016, a bomb went off outside the centre. Windows were broken but nobody was hurt. In January 2017 there were two more bombings outside refugee centres and three neo-Nazis connected to the Nordic Resistance Movement were arrested and charged regarding the incidents. They received prison sentences of eight and a half years, five year and one and a half years respectively.

The centre held its radical bookfair for the fourth time between 28 September to 1 October 2017. The event occurs at the same time as the Gothenburg Book Fair.
