= Cox 18 =

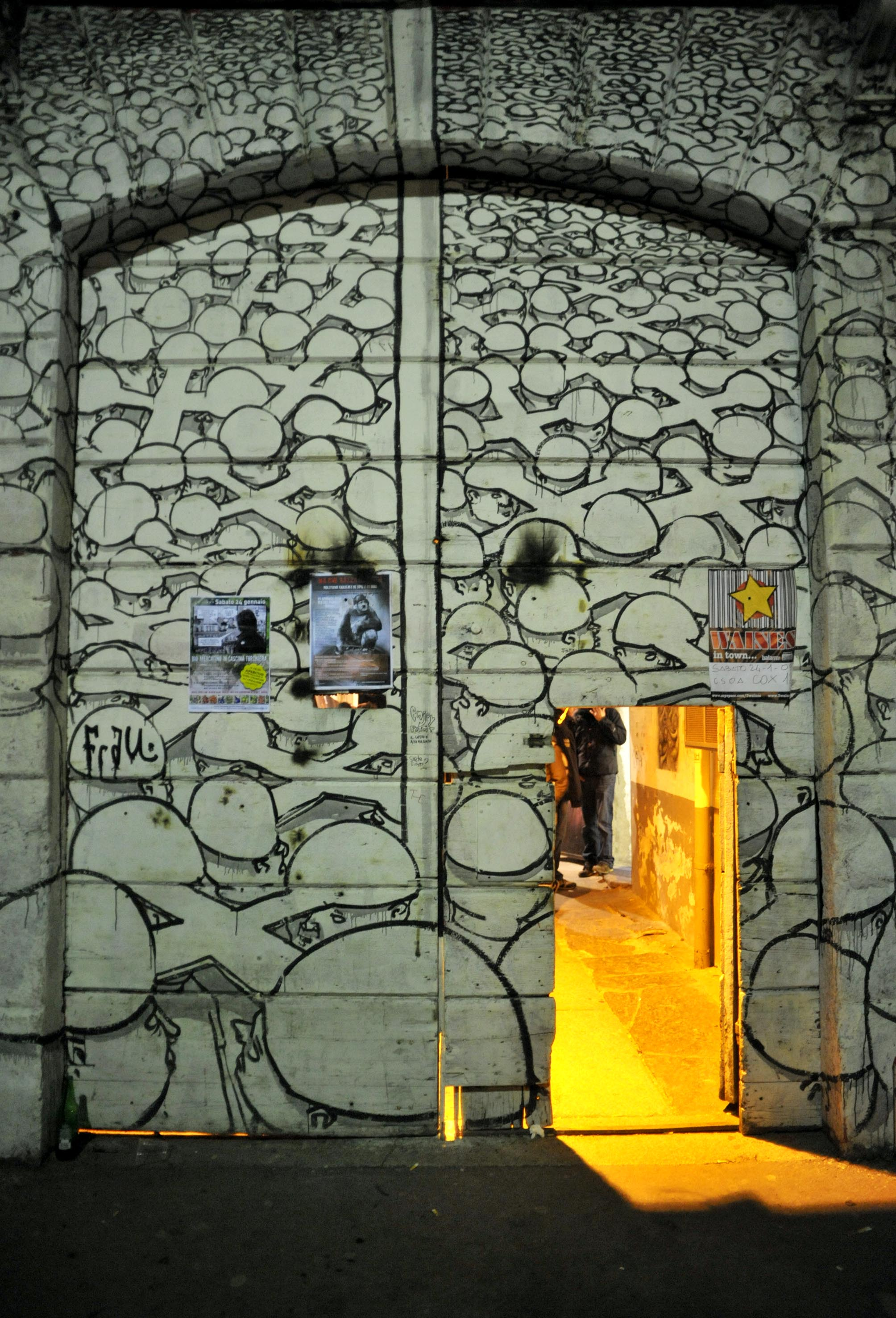
- Interactive map of Cox 18
- Address: 18 via Conchetta
- Location: Milan
- Coordinates: 45.44595°N 9.17718°E
- Type: self-managed social centre

Construction
- Opened: 1976

Website
- cox18.noblogs.org

Cox 18 is a self-managed social centre in Milan, Italy. It was first squatted in 1976 and after being evicted in 1989 was quickly re-squatted. It houses the Calusca bookshop and the Primo Moroni archive.

== History ==
Cox 18 was squatted in 1976 as the Conchetta self-managed social centre, at via Conchetta 18 in the Ticinese district of Milan in Italy. The squatters were anarchist workers and families, who ran Conchetta and also another squat called Torricelli as a place for housing people and providing local services to the community. It was evicted in January 1989 and then re-occupied a month later by punks from the evicted Virus social centre, who reformulated it as Cox 18. The centre was again evicted in 2009, in an attempt by the municipality to stop the squatters gaining title to the building through adverse possession. Public figures such as Dario Fo, Moni Ovadia, Franca Rame, Paolo Rossi, Bebo Storti and Elio Fiorucci voiced their support and the building was re-occupied.

Calusca bookshop, which had been running in different venues in the Ticinese district, found a new home in Cox 18 in 1992. The bookshop was run by Primo Moroni, Sabina Moroni and Renato Varani; it promoted radical left publications not aligned with the dominant currents of Avanguardia Operaia, Lotta Continua and Il Manifesto. Moroni died in 1998 and from 2002 onwards Cox 18 has hosted the Primo Moroni Archive. Reflecting upon his involvement with the centre, Moroni commented "certainly we have never had any illusions about changing the world through words or through ideology. Only by 'dirtying ourselves' with 'the real' can we understand it and, perhaps, begin to change it."

== See also ==
- Centro Sociale Leoncavallo
