= WORM (Rotterdam) =

Alternative art venue in the Netherlands

Coordinates: 51°54′57″N 4°28′35″E

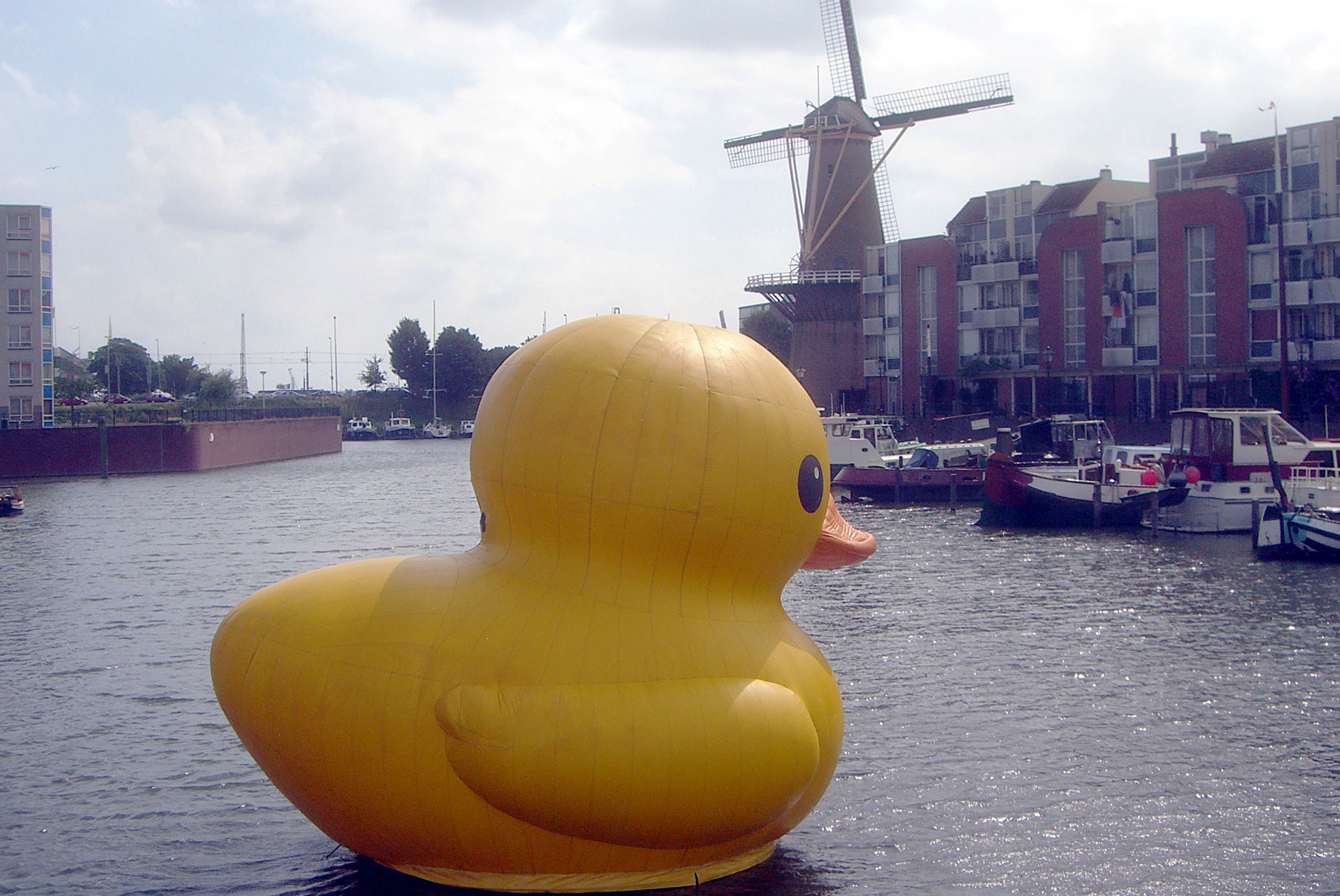
Florentijn Hofman's Rubber Duck exhibited by WORM in Rotterdam, June 29, 2008

WORM is a Rotterdam based non-profit foundation and a multi-media alternative cultural centre focused on experimental, new media art, avant-garde and underground art, primarily music and movies. WORM is funded by the Triodos Bank and part of the culture nota 2009–2012 from the Dutch government. The foundation has received the Pendrecht Culture Prize and its venue is part of the Rotterdam culture plan.

WORM organises festivals and concerts and movie nights, and runs an independent record label and a radio station. Part of the organisation is a media lab and a music studio, which run free artist in residence programmes for artists and experimental musicians. Experimental musician Lukas Simonis is the programmer of the artist in residence programme for the music studio. The studio has a collection of experimental musical instruments built by Yuri Landman. Artists that have been in residence at WORM include Tujiko Noriko, Toktek, Machinefabriek, Nancy Mauro-Flude, Jørgen Teller, One Man Nation, Blevin Blectum, Kevin Blechdom, Joe Howe, Eugene Chadbourne, Lucas Crane, Jim Xentos, Knull, Ben Butler and Mousepad, Colin Black, Harry Taylor (Action Beat), Stignoise, Hovatron, Martijn Comes, Danielle Lemaire and others.

The foundation also has a shop with left field music, art house movies and books about subjects related to the cultural focus of the organisation and strong links to computer subculture hackerspace.

The cooperative at moddr_ developed the Web 2.0 Suicide Machine and hotglue.me. Individual people involved designed and developed those projects.

The organisation co-operates closely with International Film Festival Rotterdam, Poetry International, Incubate, State-X New Forms, Museumnacht.

WORM was based at the Achterhaven until 2010. In 2011 it moved to the centre of Rotterdam and is currently located in the building formerly used as the Nederlands Fotomuseum (Dutch Photo Museum) at the Witte de Withstraat.

== Comparable Dutch avant garde centres ==
- Het Apollohuis
- Extrapool
- OT301
- STEIM
- V2 Institute for the Unstable Media
