= Centro 73 =

Former squatted social centre in Moldova

Coordinates: 47.0177°N 28.8235°E

Centro 73 (pronounced [ˈtʃentro ˌʃapteˈzetʃʲ ʃi ˈtrej]) was a social and cultural centre in Chișinău and the first squat created in Moldova. The early twentieth century villa at 73 Alexei Mateevici street was a monumental building which the owner intended to demolish. It was occupied in August 2010 and evicted in December the same year.

== History ==
The villa at 73 Alexei Mateevici street in Chişinău, the capital of Moldova, was constructed in the early twentieth century and was rated as a local monument by the Academy of Sciences. After World War II, it was lived in by a Romanian general. In 2005, the president of the Academy bought the building, intending to live there, and after two years sold it to an Italian businessman. The villa then stood empty for several years.

== Social centre ==
Inspired by squatting movements in other European countries, artists and students occupied the villa in August 2010. It was in a bad condition and with the help of volunteers it was cleaned up. It opened to the public on 25 September 2010 as Centro 73, the first squatted, self-managed social centre in Moldova. The centre was used as a place for alternative culture and events such as concerts and exhibitions were organized. On 20 November 2010, Centro 73 did a solidarity action for freedom of political prisoners in Belarus.

The Italian owner intended to demolish the building despite its monumental status, which concerned the occupiers since in the previous two years, forty buildings out of a total of 977 monuments had been demolished. On 1 November 2010, a protest was organised by Centro 73 against demolitions under the slogan "Salvaţi Chişinăul istoric" ("Save historic Chişinău"). This was featured in local media such as Publika TV and Jurnal TV. The building was evicted in December 2010 and the squatters claimed a victory since the owner had pledged to renovate instead of destroying it. Afterwards, the same group of people briefly occupied the former Turkish embassy, also on Alexei Mateevici street. They then set up Art Labyrinth in collaboration with the city authorities. The legally established cultural centre based in an old museum provided space for concerts, meetings and art exhibitions.
