= Qilombo =

Community space in Oakland, California, US

- Interactive map of Qilombo
- Former names: The Holdout
- Etymology: Based on Quilombo

General information
- Location: 2313 San Pablo Ave, CA 94612, West Oakland, US
- Coordinates: 37.8138°N 122.2747°W
- Closed: January 9, 2019
- Owner: Neil Sullivan

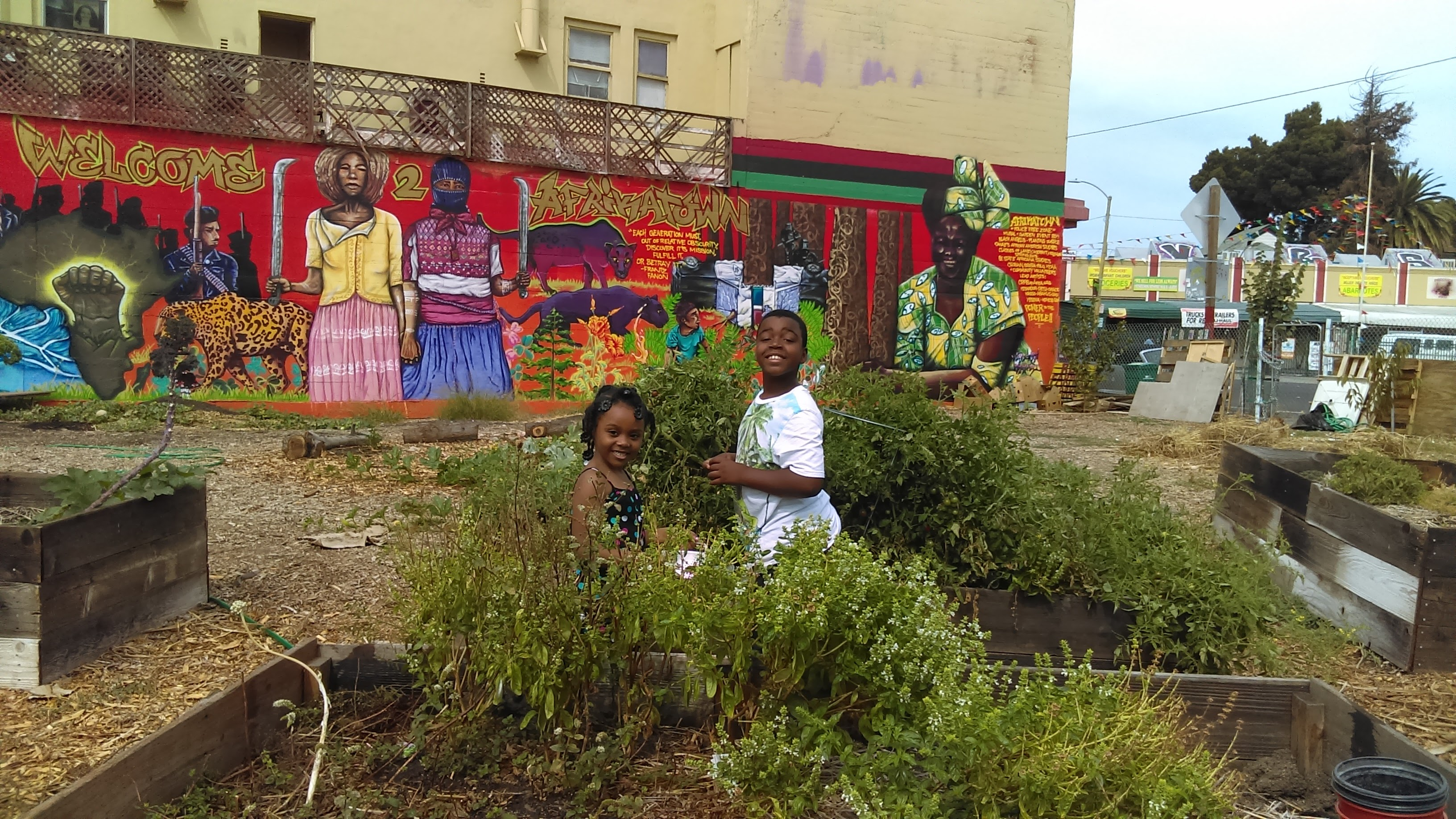
Children harvest tomatoes at the Afrika Town Garden

Qilombo (formerly The Holdout) was a community space in West Oakland, California, US, that operated from 2011 through 2019. It was originally opened as an anarchist, self-managed social center then changed its name and focus in 2014 to become a community space for local Black and Brown people. The center initiated the Afrika Town project and created the Afrika Town garden on an empty lot adjacent to the Qilombo building. The garden was evicted in 2018 and the following year Qilombo itself was closed by Alameda County officials accompanying representatives of the owner.

== History ==
The Holdout opened in 2011, at 2313 San Pablo Avenue in West Oakland. It operated for three years as an anarchist, self-managed social center. In January 2014, the Holdout closed its doors and was re-opened under the name Qilombo. The new African American collective announced in a statement that the name change honored the first quilombos (from the Kimbundu word "kilombo"), communities of Maroons established between the 16th and 19th centuries in South America as refuges from slavery and colonialism.

The collective aimed to represent the interests of Black and Brown people living locally. Over the next four years, Qilombo hosted events and launched the Afrika Town neighborhood revitalization campaign. It had a library and a freeshop; people could play chess and dominoes. Classes were given on Swahili, literacy, Maroon history, garderning, spiritual health, yoga and poetry.

== Afrika Town ==
Afrika Town (also spelled Afrikatown) was an initiative started by members of Qilombo in 2014 that aimed to resist gentrification and support local communities. Programs included self-defense classes, free breakfasts, and needle exchange. After a mural was painted on the wall of Qilombo from a neighboring empty lot in 2014, local people decided to make the wasteland into a garden. Like Qilombo itself, the Afrika Town Garden was under threat of eviction because it was within the West Oakland Specific Plan (WOSP). The garden was built on land owned by real estate investor Noel Yi; in 2015, he began a campaign to evict the garden. The eviction process lasted three years. A court order dated March 5, 2018, granted a preliminary injunction in favor of Noel Yi, ordering Afrika Town to vacate the lot.

== Closure ==
The building housing Qilombo was purchased by real estate mogul Neil Sullivan, who was buying up properties in West Oakland through his company SMC East Bay. In November 2016, SMC East Bay renewed their lease with Qilombo. However, after the Ghost Ship warehouse fire, they cancelled the agreement and sent city inspectors who told the project they could not organize public events. Qilombo resisted eviction and continued to occupy the space until January 9, 2019, when Alameda County officials accompanied the property managers to change the locks, closing it permanently.
