= Ubica =

Hotel and former squat in Utrecht

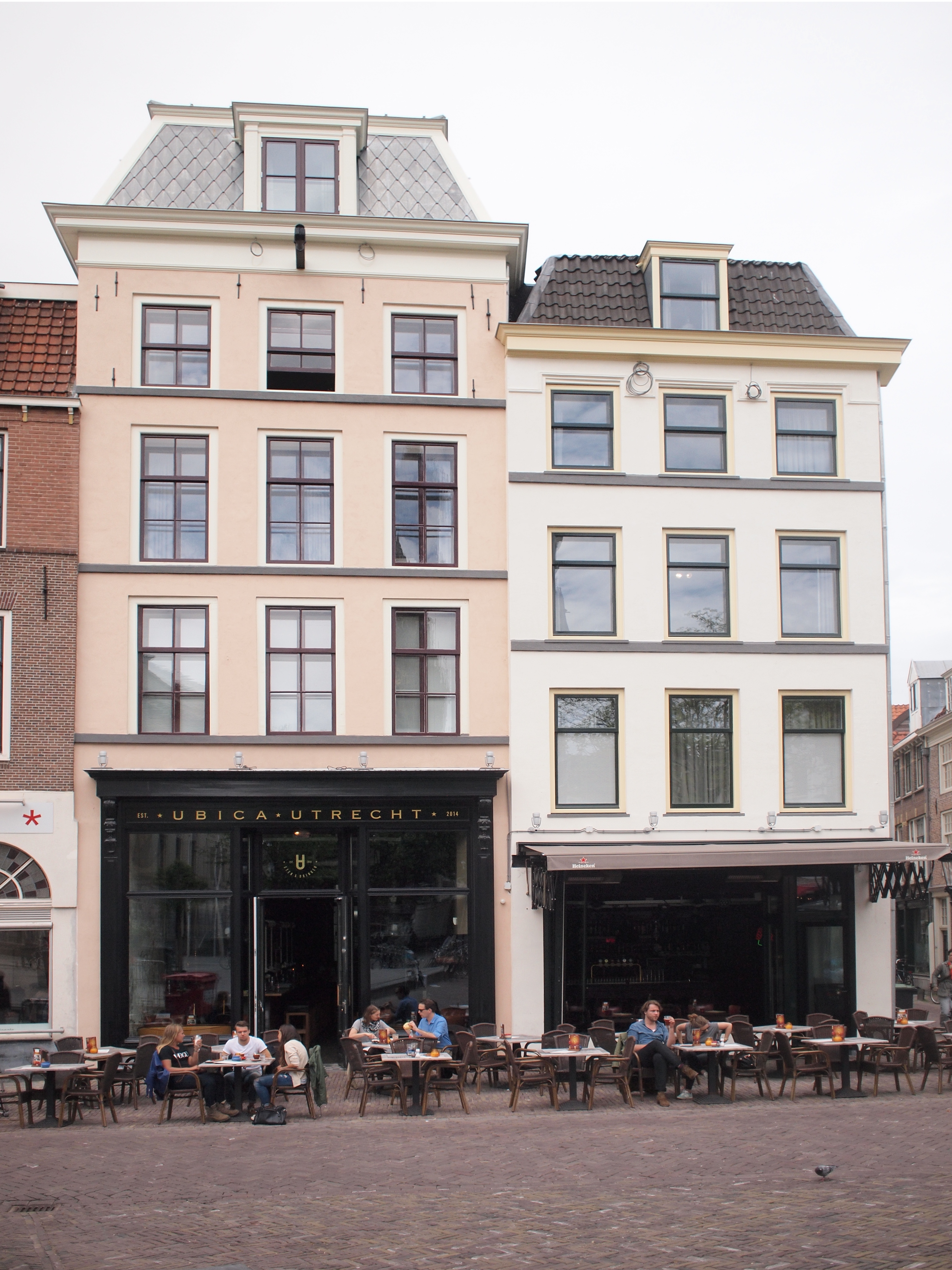
- Ubica in 2015

- Location within Utrecht (province)

General information
- Status: cafe, restaurant, hotel
- Location: Ganzenmarkt 24 & 26, Utrecht
- Coordinates: 52.092494°N 5.119803°E
- Opened: 1319
- Renovated: 2014
- Owner: Willem Klaassen

Other information
- Seating capacity: 120

Website
- ubicautrecht.nl

The Ubica buildings are two adjacent buildings standing at 24 and 26 Ganzenmarkt, in central Utrecht, the Netherlands. Number 24 is a rijksmonument. The first recorded mention of the buildings is from 1319. After centuries of residential use, the buildings were bought by the Ubica mattress company in 1913 and used until a devastating fire in 1989. The buildings were then squatted for 21 years, before being redeveloped into a hotel and café-restaurant in 2014.

== History ==
The first recorded mention of number 24 dates from 1319. This building was originally constructed in the 'weergangshuis' style, which in Utrecht is only otherwise found along the Oudegracht. The building now has a 19th century façade which pairs it with number 26, but internally the walls and beams follow a structure believed to be from the 13th century. In 1917, a painted beam was removed which now resides in the Centraal Museum.

After centuries of residential use, the buildings were taken on by mattress maker Ubica in 1931. In 1989, there was a major fire and the buildings were left in an unusable state.

== Squatted ==
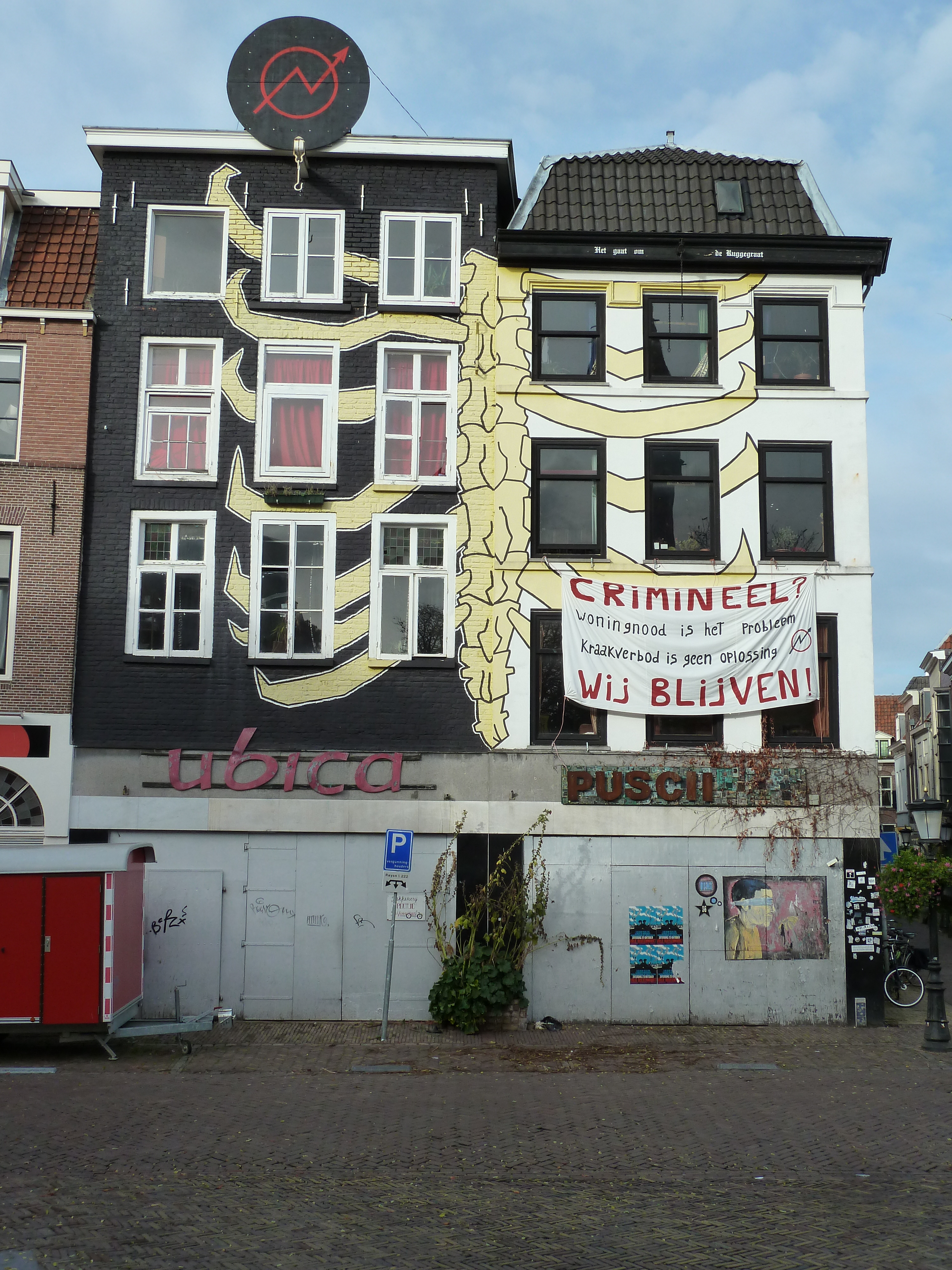
Ubica while occupied by squatters in 2010

The two buildings were squatted in February 1992. The squatters repaired the buildings and lived there in a group of 15 people. They organised various activities such as the PUSCII hacklab, infoshop Schism, art collective De Wilde Ganzen, freeshop Tranendaal, the Black Lentil cafe, cargo bike hire and a venue for concerts and art exhibitions.

The owner of Ubica was speculator Wim Vloet. He owned over 40 buildings in Utrecht and by 2012, the city council had opened 23 courtcases against him. In the same year, he was sentenced to six months imprisonment for seven criminal offences.

Vloet sold Ubica in 2012 to property developer Willem Klaassen, who announced his intention to make a hotel in the building. Vloet then decided he did not want to sell the building and a complicated legal battle began between him and Klaassen. Also the squatters went to court because they distrusted Vloet and did not want the building to be left empty but following a ruling by the higher court in Arnhem which stated they had to leave, they decided instead to provoke an eviction. The building was then evicted by riot police (Mobiele Eenheid) in May 2013. The squatters had thrown paintbombs at the neighbouring city hall and set fire to tyres in the Ganzenmarkt. They had then locked themselves in the Ubica buildings. After the eviction, the city declared the buildings unliveable and closed them. Ten squatters were arrested.

Nine of the squatters were later sentenced to one month in jail and 120 hours of community service. They also had to pay to the city and the police 14,000 euros.

== Hotel ==
At first, Wim Vloet continued to say that he considered Willem Klaassen's offer to buy the building as just a bid and he was not minded to sell the property (as the squatters had warned). However, July 2013, Vloet had decided to give up his legal battle with Klaassen and to sell him Ubica . After the renovations, a café-restaurant opened on the groundfloor of both buildings, with a hotel above. The café was called Hoppe Utrecht originally, but after a complaint from Café Hoppe in Amsterdam, it changed the name back to Ubica. The restaurant pledged to keep Ubica's historic features whilst providing places for 120 paying customers. The hotel became known as Mother Goose.

== See also ==
- ACU (Utrecht)
- ASCII (squat)
- Vrijplaats Koppenhinksteeg
- Moira (Utrecht)
