= OT301 =

Legalized squat in Amsterdam

Coordinates: 52°21′36.57″N 4°51′56.49″E

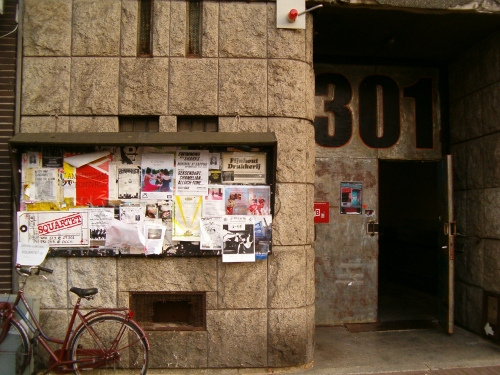
OT301

OT301 is a self-managed social centre in a legalized squat in the Dutch city of Amsterdam, located on Overtoom 301.

== History ==
In 1999, a group of artists squatted the former Dutch film academy. After serving as a breeding ground for several years, the building was bought by the user association Eerste Hulp Bij Kunst (EHBK) from the council in 2006. It is used as a multi-media alternative cultural centre, comparable to projects in other Dutch cities, such as Extrapool in Nijmegen and WORM in Rotterdam.

== Activities ==
OT301 is a venue for music and films, a non-profit print shop, artists' workspace and originally an 'organic cultural kitchen' (a vegan restaurant) called De Peper, which was closed in 2023 and has become a lunch café called Café Gilde. It has four public spaces (club, cinema, gallery, and kitchen), approximately fifteen work spaces, and a few permanent residents. Formerly, it housed the offices of European Youth For Action and Green Pepper magazine. Amsterdam Mayor Job Cohen presented OT301 with the Amsterdamprijs voor de Kunsten (Amsterdam Prize for the Arts) from the Amsterdam Fonds voor de Kunst on 23 August 2007.
