= Moira (Utrecht) =

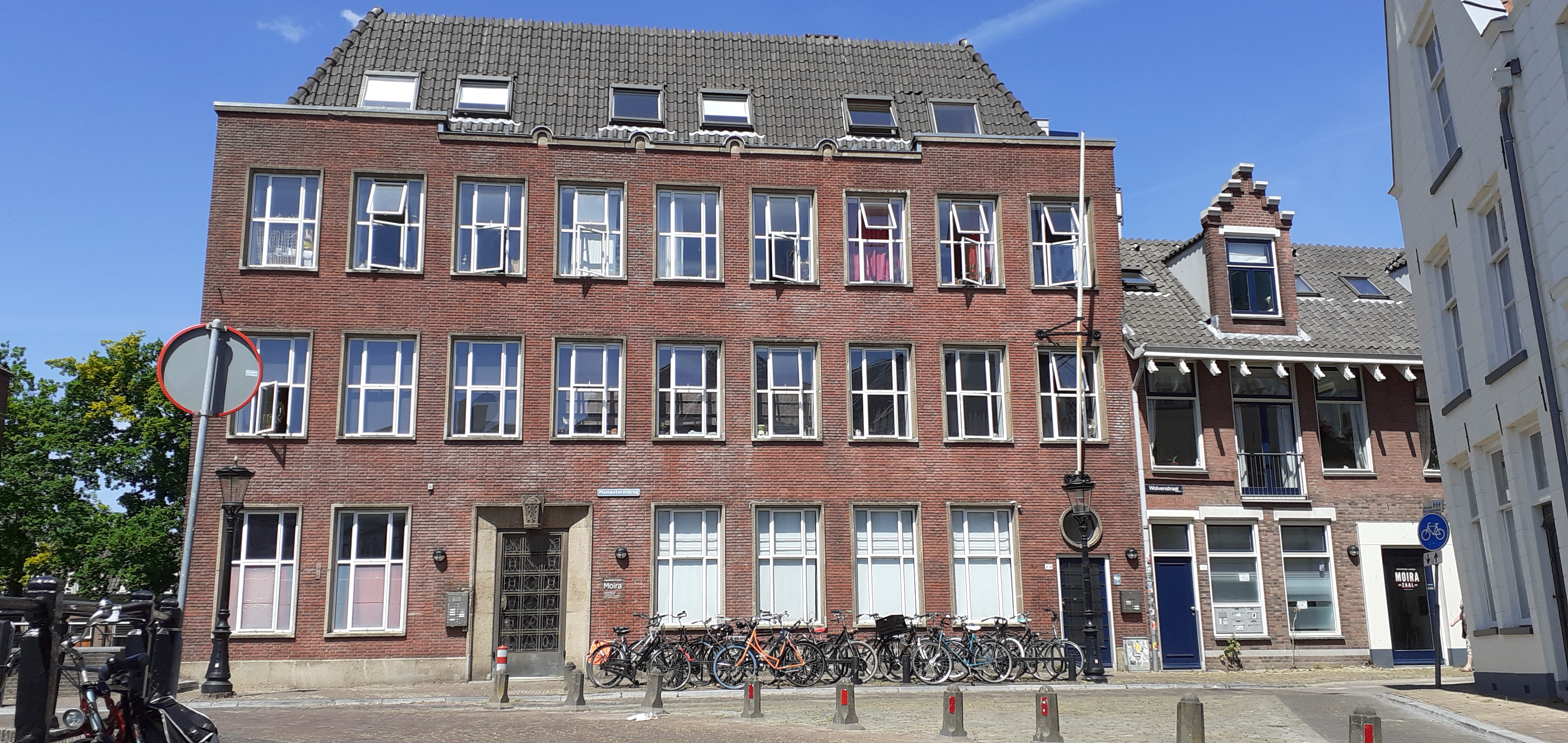
- The Moira complex, with the entry of the music hall (the Zaal) on the right

- Location within Netherlands

General information
- Status: music venue, art gallery, social centre, squat
- Location: Wolvenstraat 10, Utrecht
- Coordinates: 52.0970°N 5.1237°E
- Opened: Squatted 1983
- Renovated: 1990
- Owner: Woningcorporatie Portaal, managed by Stichting Moira

Website
- moira-utrecht.nl

Moira is a music and arts venue in the city center of Utrecht, Netherlands. The building at Wolvenstraat 10 was built in 1906. From 1939 until 1959, it was the Zegers dance school. The insurance company Moira turned it into a canteen, then after it became derelict it was squatted in 1983. Moira Foundation offers a stage to early career artists and musicians who have made little or no name in the established circuit. The exhibition space Moira organizes about ten events every year. There is a weekly open mic night.

== See also ==
- ACU (Utrecht)
- Ubica
