= Colin Black =

Australian musician and researcher

Colin Black is an Australian experimental music composer, sonic media arts practitioner, radio artist and researcher.

== Life and career ==
Black has been awarded the 2015 New York Festivals International Gold Trophy Winner for Sound Art and the 2003 Prix Italia Award for Best Music Radio – Composed Work. Black has also achieved preselection status in the 2010, 2011, 2015, 2016 and 2017 Prix Phonurgia Nova, the 2013 and 2019 Prix Marulić (Croatia), 2018 Grand Prix Nova (Romania), and 2018 UK International Radio Drama Competition. Black's commissions to create major works include the following organisations: Australian Broadcasting Corporation, Český rozhlas, Deutschlandradio, Parramatta Heritage Centre, Lismore City Council and Northern Rivers Performing Arts (NORPA). His works have been selected for events including En Red O 2000 music festival in Barcelona, Spain, the Festival Synthese in Bourges, France, Rencontres Musiques Nouvelles, Lunel France, 60x60 Pacific Basin Regional Concert Los Angeles USA, Zèppelin 2004-Festival de Arte Sonoro in Barcelona, Spain, Hipersonica 2004 in São Paulo, Brazil, The Literature Sound Barrier 2002 in Wien, Austria, Sydney University's Live Wires concerts '97, '98, and Melbourne's Extatic Concert for the Next Wave festival '98. In 2010 he was artist in residence at WORM, a Rotterdam based institute for avant garde music and art.

In 2013 Black was awarded a PhD from the University of Sydney for his research into sound art for radio. Black is also a graduate of the UNE Contemporary Music Degree and has an Honorary Graduate Diploma of Musical Directing and Composing for TV from the Australian Film, Television and Radio School.

== Major works (selected) ==
- The Ears Outside My Listening Room (2002)
- A Lullaby for the New Lands (2018)
- Soundprints as Memory (2017)
- The London Ear Drops (2016)
- Sonic Reflections (2016)
- Sliced and Diced (2016)
- In Search of Captain Cat of Llareggub (2014)
- Soundprints: Sealed in Sweden (2011)
- Kilian's Antipodean Dream (2010)
- Soundprints: The Prague Pressings (2008)
- Soundprints: The Greek Imprints Series (2004)
- Greek Imprints: The Asklepia and the Conscious Dreamer (2004)
- Longing, Love and Loss (2008)
- The Butter Churn Sound Sculpture (2007)
- Alien In The Landscape (2007)
- Dusk (2006)
- The Flood (Soundscape) (2004)
- Parramatta: People & Place installation (2001)
- The Variety Show at The End of The World (1999)
- 118, 120, 122 (part one ) (1998)

== Written publications ==
- “An Overview of Spatialised Broadcasting Experiments With a Focus on Radio Art Practices” Organised Sound, Volume 15 No. 3, 2010. ISSN 1355-7718.
- “Radiokonst Enligt Svensk Modell” translated into Swedish by Andreas Engström, Nutida Musik, # 2, 2011. ISSN 1652-6082
- “An Overview of Australian Radiophonic and Radio Art Practices”, World New Music Magazine No. 20, 2010. International Society for Contemporary Music. ISSN 1019-7117.
- “Radio Art: An Acoustic Media Art Form,” 4th Media Art Scoping Study Symposium, 4 July 2009, Melbourne.
- “Radio Art: Broadcast or Outcast,” Music Forum. Journal of the Music Council of Australia, Vol. 15 No. 2, FEBRUARY — APRIL 2009. ISSN 1327-9300.
- “Alien In The Landscape: Distillation and Filtration of Soundscapes”, Sounding Out 4 – An International Symposium on Sound in the Media, 4–6 September 2008, University of Sunderland, UK
- “Is Anyone Listening”, RealTime issue #84 April–May 2008, Published by Open City Inc
- “The Extended Enviro-Guitar (XEG): A Mobile Acoustic Profiling Resonating Filter”, 4th International Mobile Music Workshop, Amsterdam 2007.
- “Radio Art: The age of the ‘Bunker’ Artist, Digging in Deeper, Spreading Thinner ...” Vital Signs Conference, Melbourne 2005.
- “Oh Dear ABC”, Limelight, January 2004

== Awards ==
- 2003 Prix Italia Award
- 2015 New York Festivals International Radio Program Awards, Gold Trophy Winner, Sound Art
- 2019 Prix Marulić (Croatia), Preselection
- 2018 Grand Prix Nova (Romania), Preselection
- 2018 UK International Radio Drama Competition, Shortlisted
- 2017 Prix Phonurgia Nova Award, Sound Art, (final selection round status)
- 2016 Prix Phonurgia Nova Award, Radio Art, (final selection round status)
- 2015 Prix Phonurgia Nova Award, Radio Art, Final Round Selection
- 2013 Prix Marulic (Croatia), Preselection
- 2011 Prix Phonurgia Nova Awards (final selection round status)
- 2010 Prix Phonurgia Nova Awards (final selection round status)
- 2000 Australian Guild Screen Composers Screen Music Awards Nomination for Best Music for a Station ID or Promo
