= Binz squat =

Former squat in Switzerland

Binz
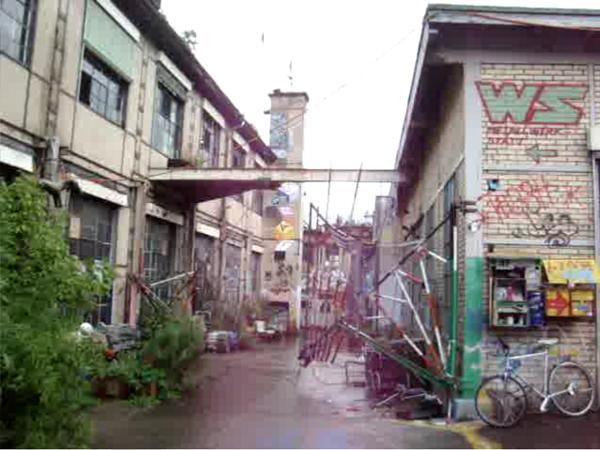
- The Binz squat in 2010
- Interactive map of the Binz area

General information
- Status: social centre, squat
- Location: Üetlibergstrasse 111, Zürich
- Coordinates: 47.3607°N 8.5182°E
- Closed: 2013

Binz was a factory building squatted as a self-managed social centre in the district of Wiedikon in Zürich, Switzerland, from 2006 until 2013. The squat housed 50 people and provided workspaces for 100. From 2009 onwards, the city council wanted to evict and demolish the project. It was finally evicted in December 2013, resulting in riots.

== Background ==
Urban squats are a widespread phenomenon. Occupancy without legal title – also defined as squatting – has always existed, but the Binz falls in the category of squats organized by or at least supported by a social movement, also described with the term political squatting. Political squatting offers not only a radical solution to the crisis of housing, it is also a collective experiment in communal living and directly connected to strategies of urban renewal. The Binz was not just an occupancy without legal title, it was a place where alternative forms of living were practiced and non-commercial culture was supported.

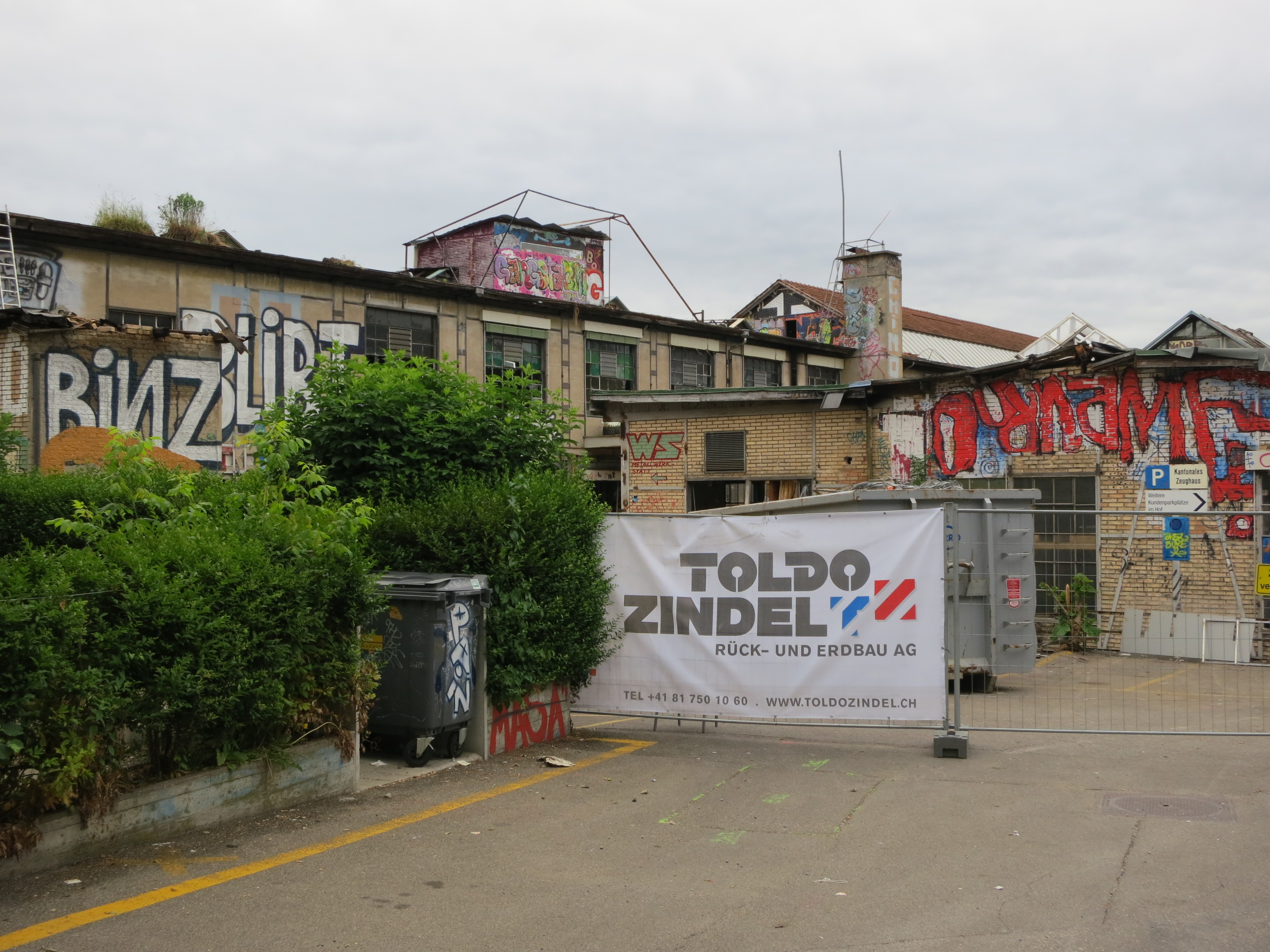
Binz in 2013

== Occupation ==
Binz was squatted as a self-managed social centre in the district of Wiedikon in Zürich from 2006 until 2013. The squat housed 50 people and provided workspaces for 100. From 2009 until 2013, the Binz squatters were constantly negotiating the demolition date of the factory with the city government and organized different protests against the forthcoming eviction. The protest with the biggest media response was also the final one. During the night of March 3, 2013, a party at the Binz led to a non-permitted demonstration. During the party, the organizers asked the guests to take over the streets and continue the party in public space as a way of protesting against the upcoming eviction. The demonstration started as a peaceful demonstration with 2000 mainly young people accompanied by several self-constructed cars serving as mobile DJ stands, stages for live bands and mobile bars. The situation escalated quickly when the protesters confronted the police. During the ensuing riots, several shops were plundered, road barricades were set up and large-scale property damage occurred while the police took action against the protesters with tear gas, rubber pellets and water guns. The material damage was estimated by the police to be about one million Swiss Francs. Despite the dimension of the riots, nobody was arrested.

== Eviction ==
At the end of May 2013, the Binz squatters left the factory building voluntarily on the day of the defined deadline. The majority of the occupants moved to another squatted factory in the district of Altstetten.
