= Centro Sociale Leoncavallo =

Self-managed social centre in Milan, Italy

Leoncavallo
- Leoncavallo Spazio Pubblico Autogestito
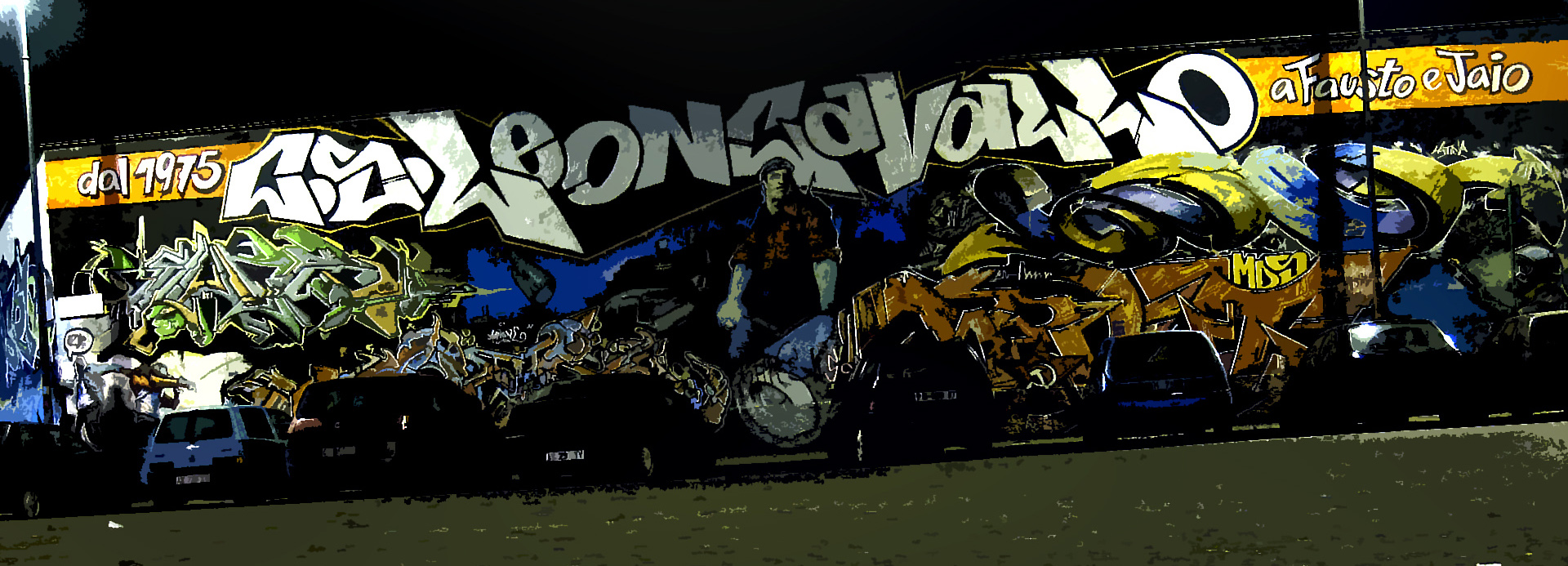
- Graffiti at Leoncavallo

- Location within Lombardy Location within Italy Location within Europe
- Address: 7 Via Antoine Watteau 20125
- Location: Milan
- Coordinates: 45.50159°N 9.20773°E
- Capacity: 10,000 m²
- Type: Printers
- Event: Self-managed social centre

Construction
- Opened: 1975
- Closed: 2025

Website
- leoncavallo.org

Centro Sociale Leoncavallo was a self-managed social centre in Milan, Italy, which had existed since a former factory on via Leoncavallo was squatted in 1975. It was evicted and partially demolished in 1989, then quickly reoccupied and rebuilt. It was evicted again in 1994 and briefly moved to a warehouse for six months before occupying its still extant location on via Antoine Watteau. Activities included concerts, theatre, debates, exhibitions and a radio station. The social centre described itself as Leoncavallo Self-Managed Public Space (Italian: Leoncavallo Spazio Pubblico Autogestito). It was evicted on 21 August 2025.

== History ==
The Leoncavallo social centre was first occupied in 1975. The former Scotti pharmaceutical factory (3,600m²) was on Leoncavallo Street in the northeast of the city. In 1989, the mayor of Milan decided to evict the building's residents in accordance with the wishes of the owner and it was then partially demolished. A few days after the eviction, Leoncavallo was reoccupied and rebuilt by hand.

Right-wing politicians campaigned against the centre in 1994, and it was again evicted. A warehouse on via Salomone was occupied for some months and then a new zone (a former printers) was squatted on via Antoine Watteau, close to the first site. It was 10,000m², with courtyards set around buildings and a central square. In the late 1990s, Matteo Salvini, who was at that time a city councillor, drank beer and attended events at the centre, defending it against attacks by the then Milan mayor Marco Formentini. Salvini had claimed affinity at one point for political gain but most likely was not a regular visitor.

Eventually, the city decided against eviction and the owners did not request it, since they were hoping to be paid rent. By 2000, no agreement had been reached between the parties, and the following year a representative of the centre was elected to the city council as a member of the Communist Refoundation Party. In 2004, the Leoncavallo Foundation was set up to continue negotiations.

In 2025 the centre was evicted from via Watteau by the Meloni government amid popular protest; local press reported an interest in purchasing the building from the owners, as an alternative location proposed by the municipality did not come to fruition.

== Activities ==
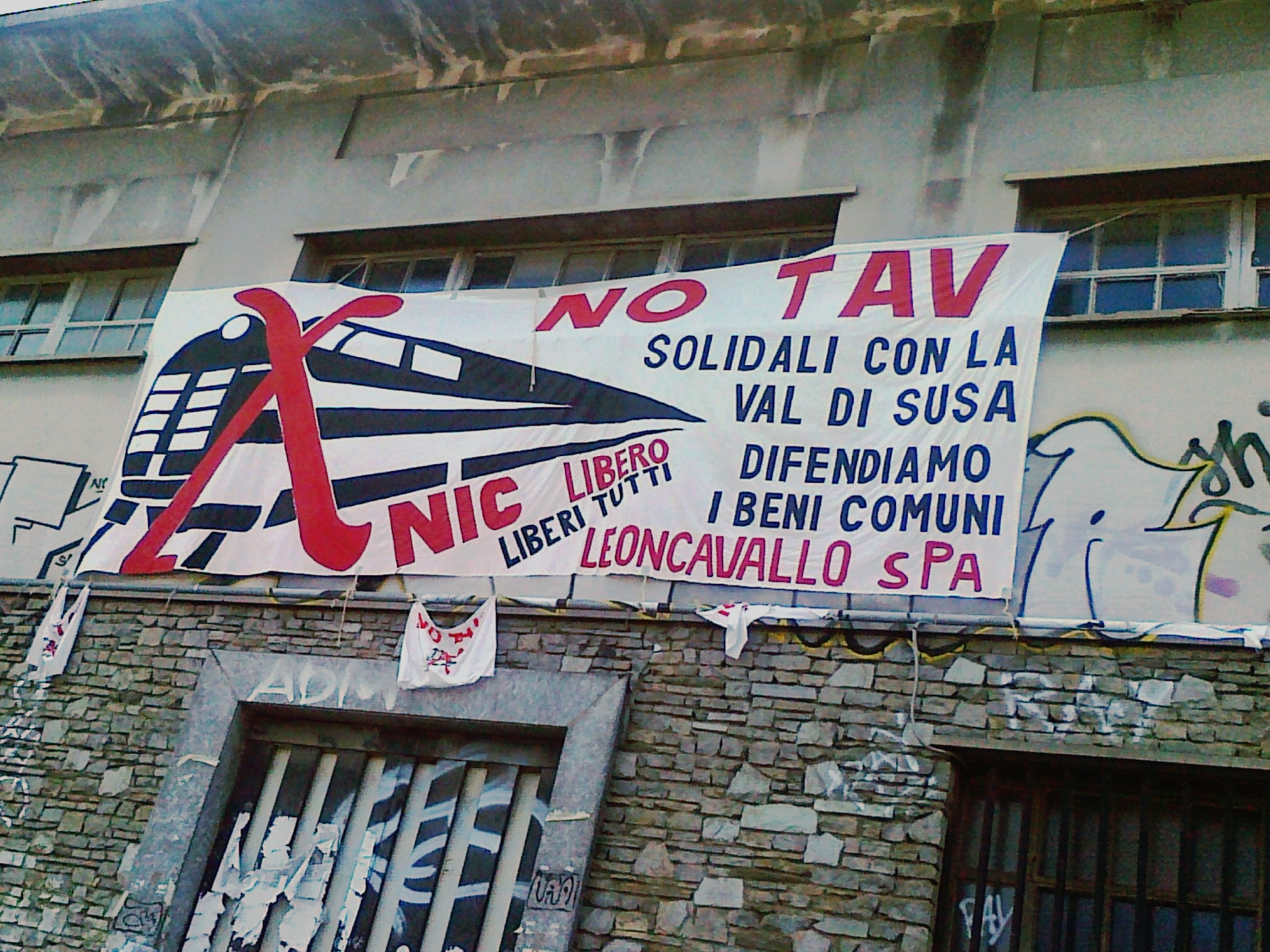
No TAV banner at Leoncavallo

Activities at the centre included musical concerts, theatre shows, debates, language courses, workshops, art exhibitions, and a radio station. Leoncavallo was also a hub for street art. Since 1995, free food and accommodation was provided for whoever needed it. As of 2003, 80 people were working at the centre, half as volunteers, half receiving solidarity tokens for their time. The centre was self-financing, generating the money it needed for upkeep from benefit concerts and bar takings. For ideological reasons, the centre refused to pay taxes.

When Naomi Klein visited Leoncavallo in 2001, she described it as "practically a self-contained city, with several restaurants, gardens, a bookstore, a cinema, an indoor skateboard ramp, and a club so large it was able to host Public Enemy when they came to town." The still-extant centre defined itself in 2019 as Leoncavallo Self-Managed Public Space (Leoncavallo Spazio Pubblico Autogestito).

== See also ==
- Forte Prenestino
- Self-managed social centres in Italy
