= ACU (Utrecht) =

Self-managed social centre in Utrecht

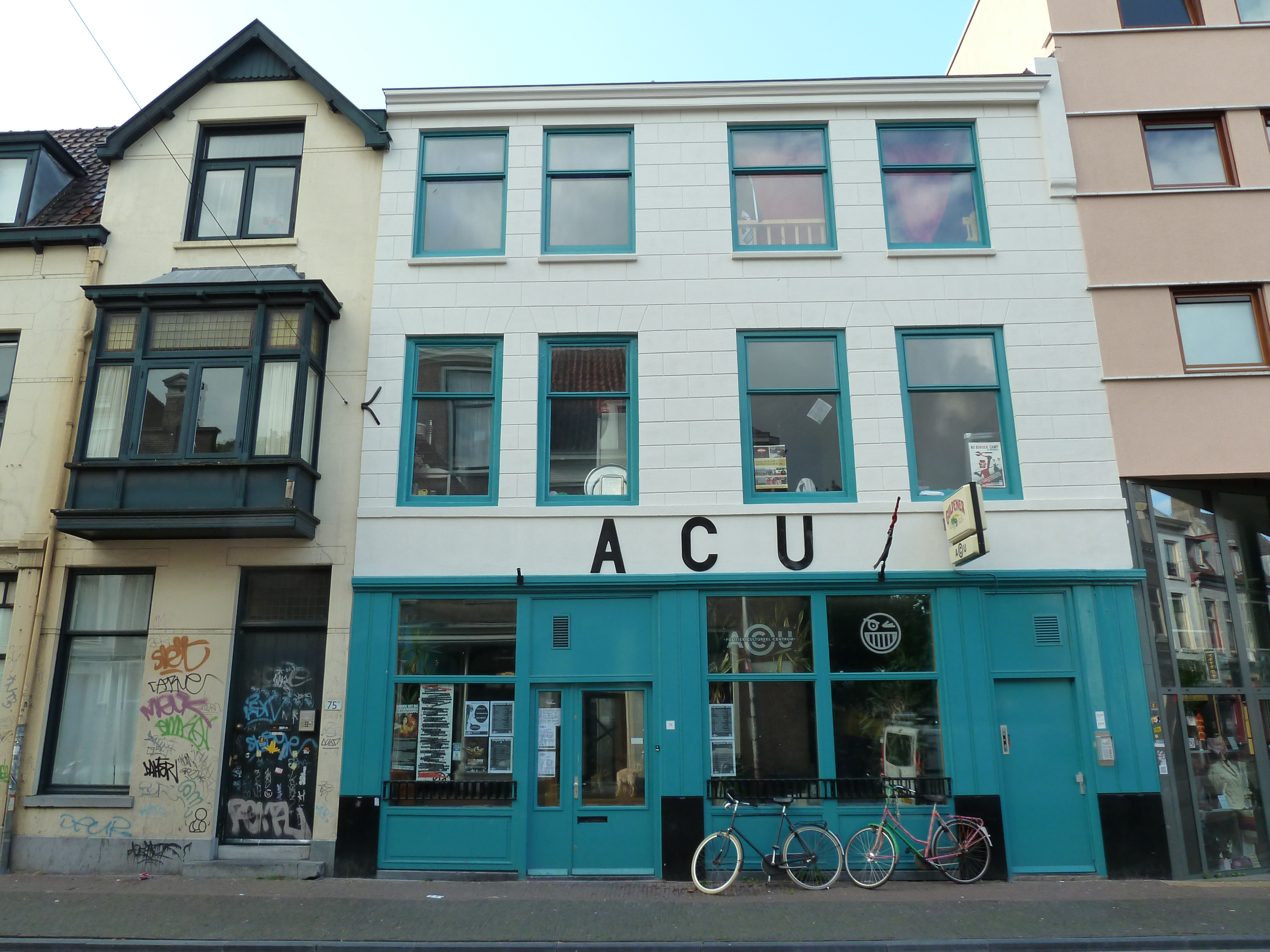
- The ACU
- Interactive map of the ACU area

General information
- Status: music venue, social centre
- Location: Voorstraat 71, Utrecht, Netherlands
- Coordinates: 52.0950°N 5.1219°E
- Opened: 1935, squatted 1976
- Renovated: 1998
- Owner: Stichting Kraakhelder en Toch Niet Fris

Website
- acu.nl

ACU is a political-cultural venue in the city centre of Utrecht, in the Netherlands. The name ACU is derived from "Auto Centrale Utrecht" (Car Centre Utrecht) and is one of the many signs of its origin as an old squat. Nowadays it is still run by volunteers as an infoshop and social centre in order to keep it an independent and non-profit harbour within Utrecht's nightlife.

== History ==
The car centre ACU existed from 1935 to 1967. In 1976, the premises were squatted and adapted for habitation. Over time, multiple small businesses settled there as well, for example a bike-shop. The residents started a cinema in the former showroom in 1979. After two years, the cinema gave way to a coffeehouse, creating a public space for the squatting community. This space evolved into a venue that has been offering a stage to local and international bands since 1985.

After almost being evicted the squatters realized the premises had to be bought. A foundation "stichting Voorstaete" was established to buy the property. In 1994, Stichting Voorstaete bought the ACU and the squatted premises around the corner, which now houses the hostel Strowis. After years of refurbishing the building, the ACU reopened in 1998, and was completed as the current venue in 1999.

== Activities ==
The ACU hosts a wide range of activities including: anarchist library the Barricade, benefits, concerts, films, meetings poetry events, political info nights, queer events and a vegan restaurant.

== See also ==
- Moira (Utrecht)
- Ubica
