= Buridda (social centre) =

Self-managed social centre in Genoa, Italy (2003–2024)

- LSOA Buridda
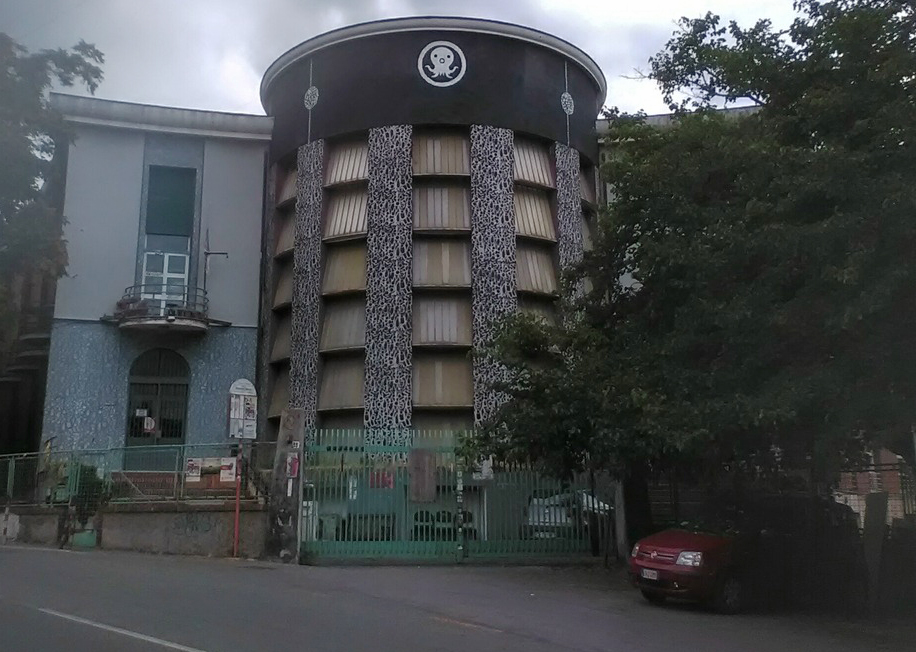
- Facade of LSOA Buridda building, Genoa, Italy
- Named after: Buridda
- Formation: May 11, 2003; 23 years ago
- Founded at: Genoa, Italy
- Defunct: 30 July 2024; 2 years ago
- Type: Social centre
- Legal status: Defunct
- Coordinates: 44.4117°N 8.9488°E
- Website: buridda.org

Buridda, officially known as LSOA Buridda (Laboratorio Sociale Occupato Autogestito—"occupied self-managed social laboratory"), was a squatted, self-managed social centre in the north Italian city of Genoa, established in 2003. It changed location several times and was finally evicted on 30 July 2024.

== History ==
The former Faculty of Economics at Via Bertani 1 was squatted as a social centre on 11 May 2003. The official status of the occupied building was disputed. Initially owned by the University of Genoa, it was eventually purchased by Giuseppe Pericu shortly before his term as mayor of Genoa ended. On 4 June 2014, the police raided the squat and evicted all its occupants. This proved to be an unpopular move on the part of the city, and an outpouring of online support followed the police action. Within a few weeks, the Buridda collective had found a new space to occupy at Corso Montegrappa 39. On 7 June, they temporarily occupied Garaventa, an abandoned elementary school in the historic centre of the city. Following this, the group planned a large rally for 14 June. The event took place as planned, and an estimated 2,000 people took part in the procession. The municipal police, under the impression that the squatters would try to reoccupy Via Bertani 1, kept the building under armed guard. The procession instead occupied Corso Montegrappa—the former Magisterium of Genoa, inaugurated by Benito Mussolini in 1937, and owned by the University of Genoa. Buridda was raided and evicted by the police on 30 July 2024.
