= Metropoliz =

Large migrant squat in Rome

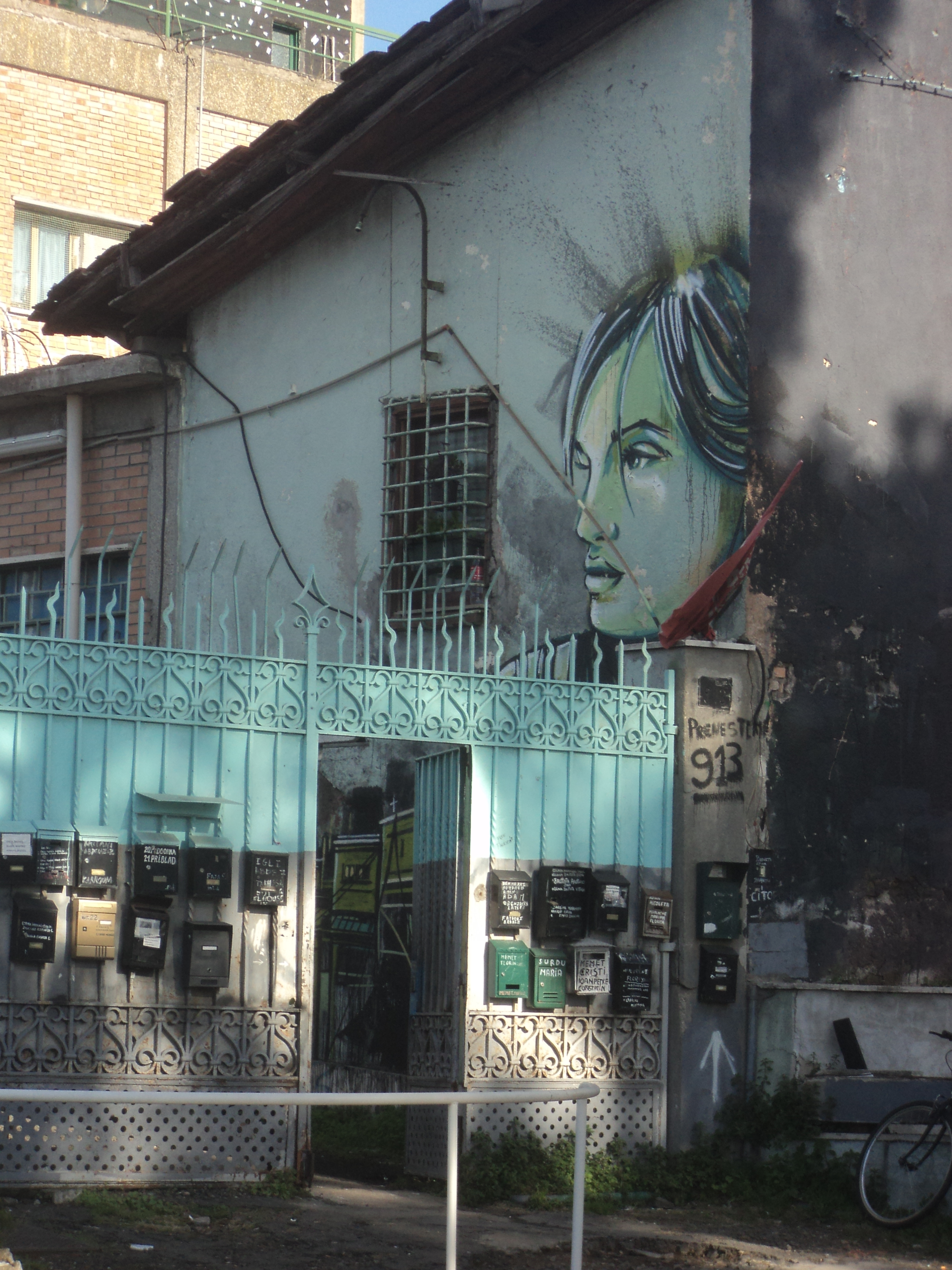
- Entrance

General information
- Status: Squatted
- Type: Factory
- Address: Via Prenestina 913
- Town or city: Rome
- Country: Italy
- Coordinates: 41.89431°N 12.59550°E
- Opened: 2009 (squatted)

Metropoliz is a former salami factory on the eastern periphery of Rome, squatted in 2009. It is the first large squat in Rome where Romani people live alongside other ethnic groups. In 2012, a museum opened on the site which has become a recognised contemporary art gallery.

== Occupation ==
The derelict salami factory owned by Salini Impregilo was squatted in 2009 by one hundred people from Blocchi Precari Metropolitani (BPM), a group focused on housing activism, and Popica, an association promoting the rights of Romani people. The Romani squatters had already been living together in a squat called Casilino 700 and joined Metropoliz following its eviction. Metropoliz became the first large squat in Rome where Romani lived together with other ethnic groups, mainly Italian, Moroccan and Peruvian. The Romani lived in a space evicted by the police in 2012, whereupon most of the families moved into the main building.

Fabrizio Boni and Giorgio de Finis made a film called Space Metropoliz with some of the residents and afterwards in 2012, de Finis proposed to set up an art gallery. This is called Museo dell'altro e dell'altrove metropolitano (Museum of the Other and the Elsewhere) or MAAM. It opens only on Saturdays and has become a successful, free to enter contemporary art gallery. The MAAM supports the squat politically by bringing engagement from people who would otherwise not enter it.

As of 2017, around two hundred squatters of various nationalities live at the complex. After negotiations, the city council has announced that if the squat is evicted the residents will be rehoused. For the Romani this was the first time they had been offered social housing, since the usual state policy towards Romani informal settlements would be relocation into official camps.

== See also ==
- Athens refugee squats
