= Extrapool =

Extrapool is a Nijmegen based non-profit foundation, and an artist-run initiative focused on experimental music, movies, avant-garde art, and underground art. Extrapool was raised in 1991 and is funded by the city of Nijmegen.

Extrapool organises festivals and concerts, movie nights, artists in residencies, and produces publications. Part of the organisation is also a silk screen studio, and a music studio. The visual workspace and music studio both run free artist in residence programs for artists and experimental musicians. Besides the venue and studio the foundation also has a shop with left field music, art house movies and books about subjects related to the cultural focus of the organisation.

== Comparable Dutch avant garde centres ==
- Het Apollohuis
- OT301
- WORM
