= CSOA Forte Prenestino =

Self-managed cultural and political project in Rome, Italy

- Centro Sociale Occupato Autogestito Forte Prenestino
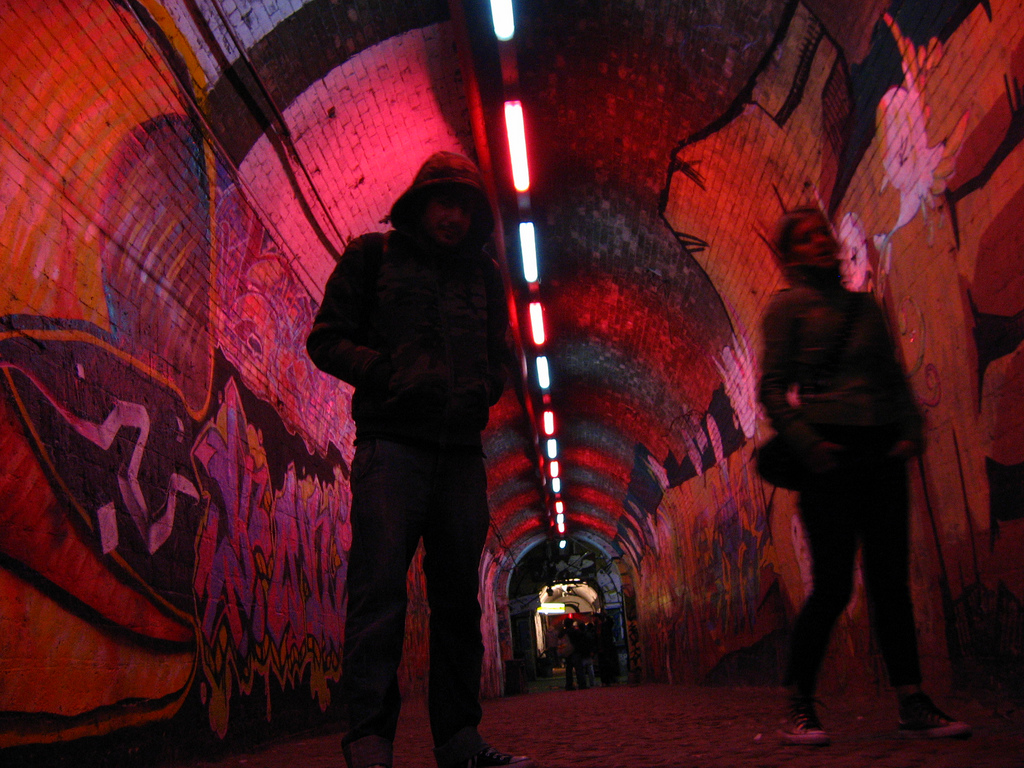
- Corridor at Forte Prenestino

- Location within Rome
- Address: 187, Via Federico Delpino, 00171
- Location: Rome
- Coordinates: 41.89231°N 12.56943°E
- Type: fort
- Event: military
- Acreage: 13 hectares

Construction
- Built: 1880-1884
- Opened: 1986

Website
- forteprenestino.net

CSOA Forte Prenestino is a large self-managed social centre based in a squatted fort in Centocelle, Rome. It was occupied on May Day 1986. Forte Prenestino is an "important node of production of cultural and political events" and hosts many groups and events across its 13 hectares.

== History of fort ==
Forte Prenestina was built between 1880 and 1884. It was one of fifteen Roman forts constructed in this time and never used in battle. By the 1950s it was derelict and from 1977 onwards it was used as a dump by the Municipality of Rome.

== Occupation ==
CSOA Forte Prenestino was occupied on May 1, 1986, during a 'Festival of Non-Work.' CSOA (Italian: Centro Sociale Occupato Autogestito) means 'Occupied Self-Managed Social Centre.' The squatters cleaned the site and all the rubbish which had been dumped there was removed.

== Activities ==
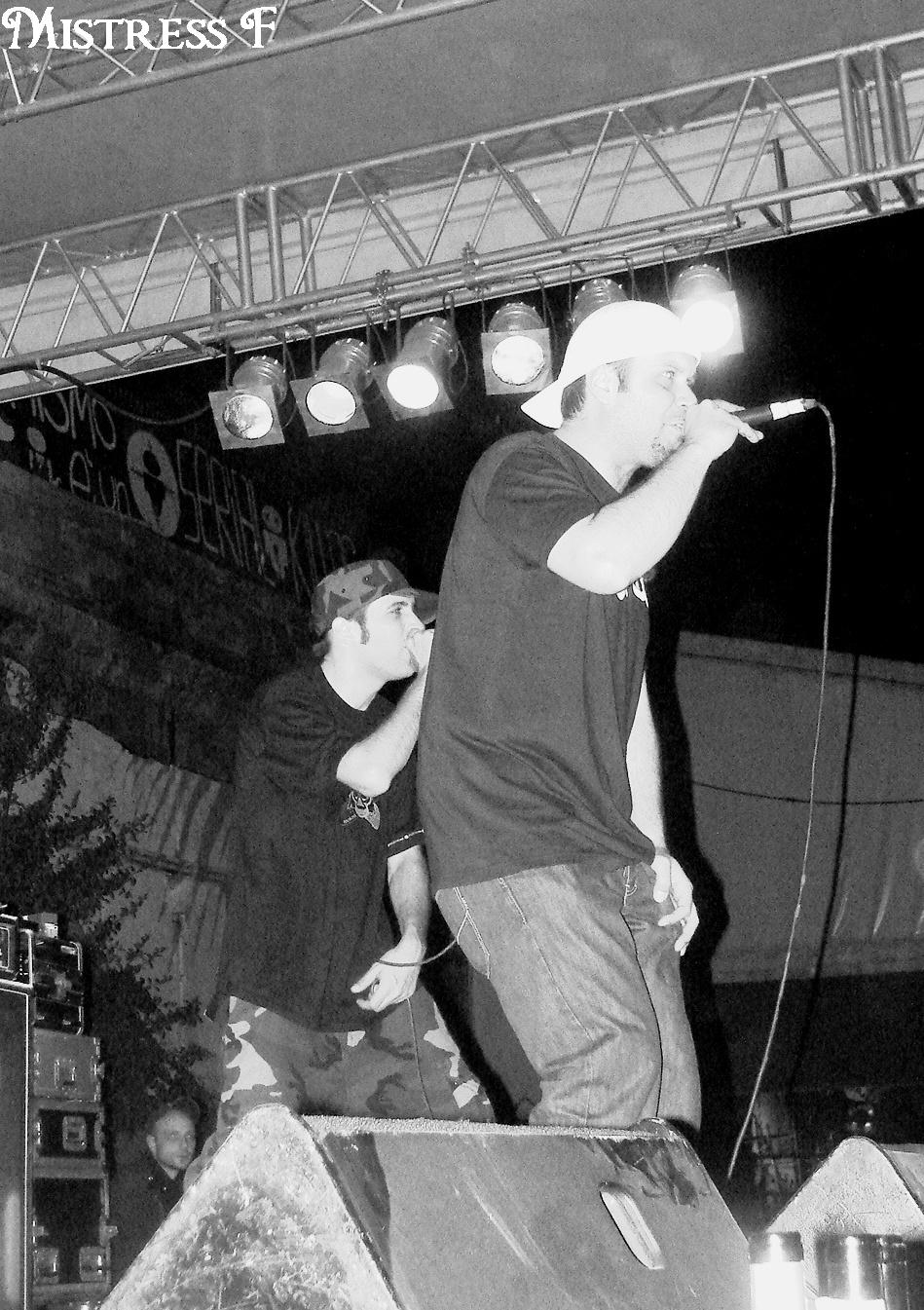
Hip hop group Colle der Fomento performing at Forte Prenestino

The size of the centre allows it to host many groups and activities. In 1996, Steve Wright wrote that: "Forte Prenestino plays an important role in its local community. It houses an exhibition gallery, practice rooms for bands, space for theatrical performances, a dark room, gymnasium, and cafe. Classes are held, there are regular film nights, courses on design and sculpture, and a documentation centre. Outside Rome, the Forte is best known for its music label, featuring local rap and reggae bands. It also produces the journal Nessuna Dipendenza, which documents the Forte's activities and engages in political discussion and debate."

The rap group Assalti Frontali built a recording studio at the fort in the 1990s. Many internationally known bands, for example Autechre, Fugazi (5 times), Mano Negra and Test Department have played at the centre.

There is also an antifascist gym. Other activities include an infoshop, a bicycle workshop, a children's playground, a garden with flora guide and a herbalist shop. Organisations utilising different areas include a cinema, a bar, a theatre, a permanent exhibition area, a tattoo and piercing studio, a tea room and an organic farmers market.
