= ASCII (squat) =

Defunct hackerspace in Amsterdam

Coordinates: 52.3691°N 4.9018°E

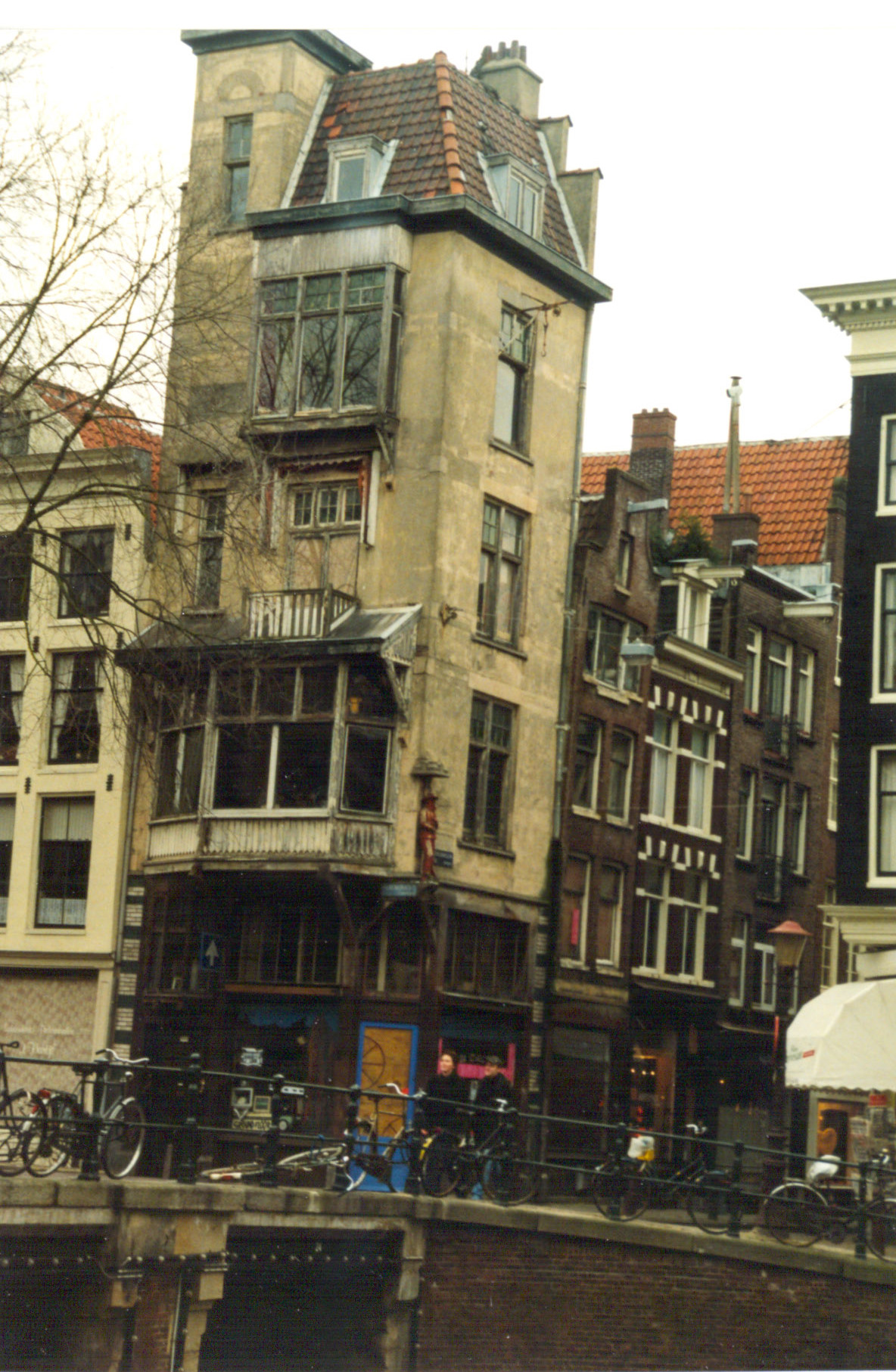
Initial ASCII location on the ground floor of a squatted house on Heerengracht. Photo taken around 1999

The Amsterdam Subversive Center for Information Interchange (ASCII) was a squatted communication laboratory in the Dutch city of Amsterdam. The first incarnation was formed in 1999, based at Herengracht 243a. The lab then moved to the following locations: Jodenbreestraat 24, Kinkerstraat 92–94, Kostverlorenkade 2e, Wibautstraat 7 and Javastraat.

ASCII became legalised when it moved into Jodenbreestraat 24 in January 2000, alongside the radical bookshop Fort van Sjakoo, but started squatting again when faced with a 900% rent increase.

The original aim was to provide a free internet work space for activists and squatters and to promote open source operating systems such as Linux and free software programs such as OpenOffice.org and Mozilla. Members of the collective scavenged and rebuilt computers from trash. In 2005, ASCII was involved with a plan to set up free community wireless internet access across Amsterdam. In 2006, Javastraat location was evicted.

== See also ==
- Hackerspace
- Social centre
