= Self-managed social center =

Community self-managed spaces in which anti-authoritarians self-organise activities

A self-managed social center, also known as an autonomous social center, is a self-organized community center in which anti-authoritarians put on voluntary activities. These autonomous spaces, often in multi-purpose venues affiliated with anarchism, can include bicycle workshops, infoshops, libraries, free schools, meeting spaces, free stores and concert venues. They often become political actors in their own right.

The centers are found worldwide, for example in Italy, the United States and the United Kingdom. They are inspired by the anarchist movement along with left-wing movements and intentional communities. They are squatted, rented, or owned cooperatively.

== Uses ==
Self-managed social centers vary in size and function depending on local context. Uses can include an infoshop, a radical bookshop, a resource centre offering advice, a hacklab, a café, a bar, an affordable gig space, independent cinema or a housing co-operative. As well as providing a space for activities, these social centers can become actors in opposing local issues such as gentrification or megaprojects. Alongside protest camps, social centers are projects in which the commons are created and practiced.

== History ==
Western anarchists have long created enclaves in which they could live their societal principles of non-authoritarianism, mutual aid, gifting, and conviviality in microcosm. Some of these community sites include Wobbly union halls (1910s, 1920s), Barcelonan community centers during the Spanish Revolution, and squatted community centers since the 1960s. They share a lineage with the radical intentional communities that have periodically surfaced throughout history and are sometimes termed Temporary Autonomous Zones or "free spaces", in which a counter-hegemonic resistance can form arguments and tactics. Anarchists outside the class-struggle and workplace activism tradition instead organize through autonomous spaces including social centers, squats, camps, and mobilizations. While these alternative institutions tend to exist in transience, their proponents argue that their ideas are consistent between incarnations and that temporary institutions prevents government forces from easily clamping down on their activities.

A free, or autonomous, space is defined as a place independent from dominant institutions and ideologies, formed outside standard economic relations, and fostering self-directing freedom through self-reliance. These nonhierarchical rules encourage experimental approaches to organization, power-sharing, social interaction, personal development, and finance. Social centers can be squatted, rented, or owned cooperatively. They are largely self-maintained by volunteers and often close for reasons of burnout and reduced participation, especially if participant free time wanes as their economic circumstances change.

== Italy ==
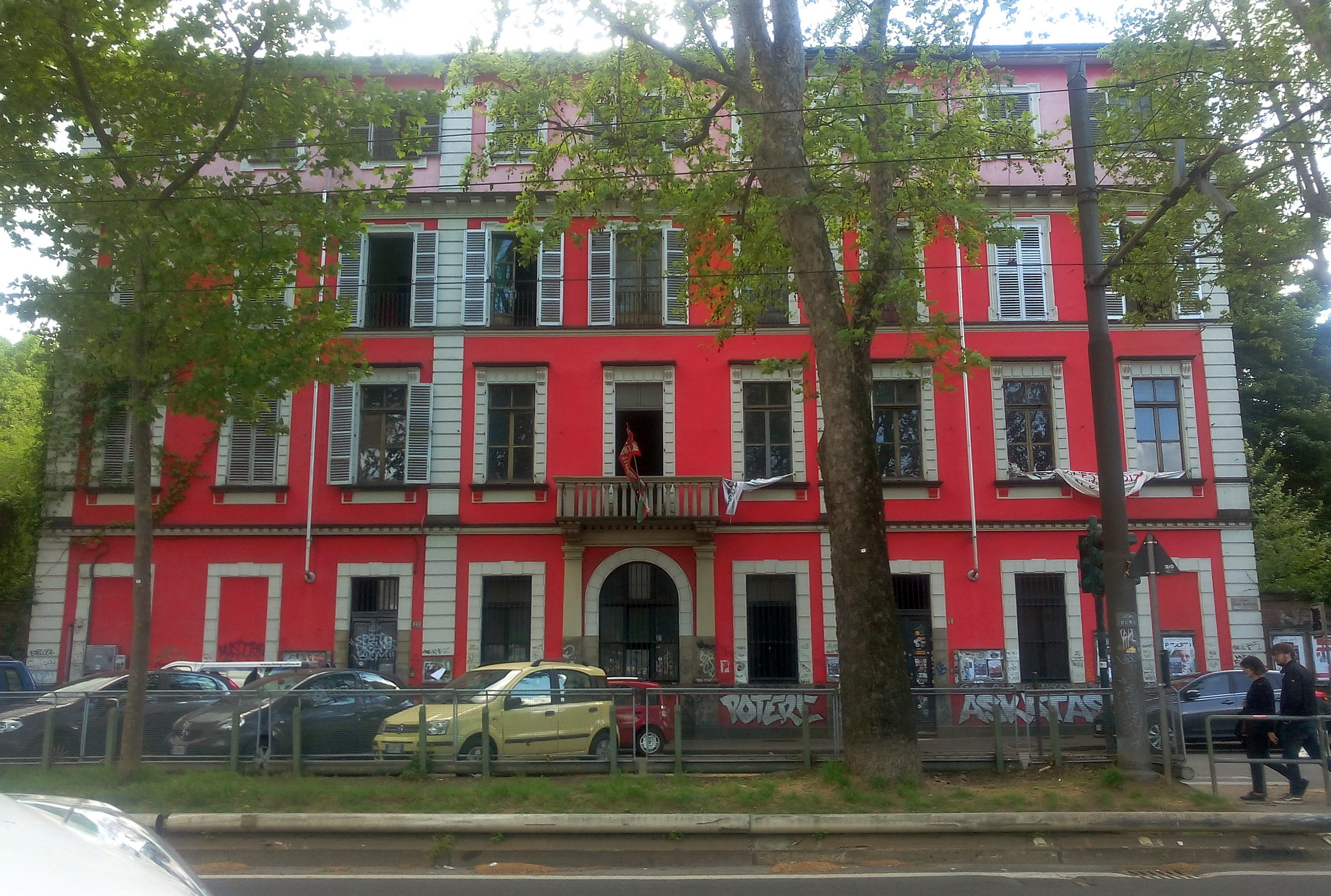
Askatasuna social centre in Turin, 2016

Since the 1980s, young Italians maintained self-managed social centers (centri sociali) where they gathered to work on cultural projects, listen to music, discuss politics, and share basic living information. These projects are often squatted, and are known as Centro Sociale Occupato Autogestito (CSOA) (squatted self-managed social centers). By 2001, there were about 150 social centers, set up in abandoned buildings such as former schools and factories. These centers operate outside state and free market control, and have an oppositional relationship with the police, often portrayed by conservative media as magnets for crime and illicit behavior. The Italian cultural centers were sometimes funded by city cultural programming.

== United States ==
In the United States, self-managed social centers primarily take the form of infoshops and radical bookstores, such as Bluestockings in New York City and Red Emma's in Baltimore. Since the 1990s, North American anarchists have created community centers, infoshops, and free spaces to foster alternative cultures, economies, media, and schools as a counterculture with a do-it-yourself ethic. These social spaces, as distinguished from regional intentional communities of the midcentury, often seek to integrate their community with the existing urban neighborhood instead of wholly "dropping out" of society to rural communes.

== United Kingdom ==
The rise of social centres in the United Kingdom as cultural activity and political organizing hubs has been a major feature of the region's radical and anarchist politics. For example, the 1 in 12 Club in Bradford provides a café, a children's play area, a bar, an infoshop, large meeting areas and concert spaces.

== Infoshops ==
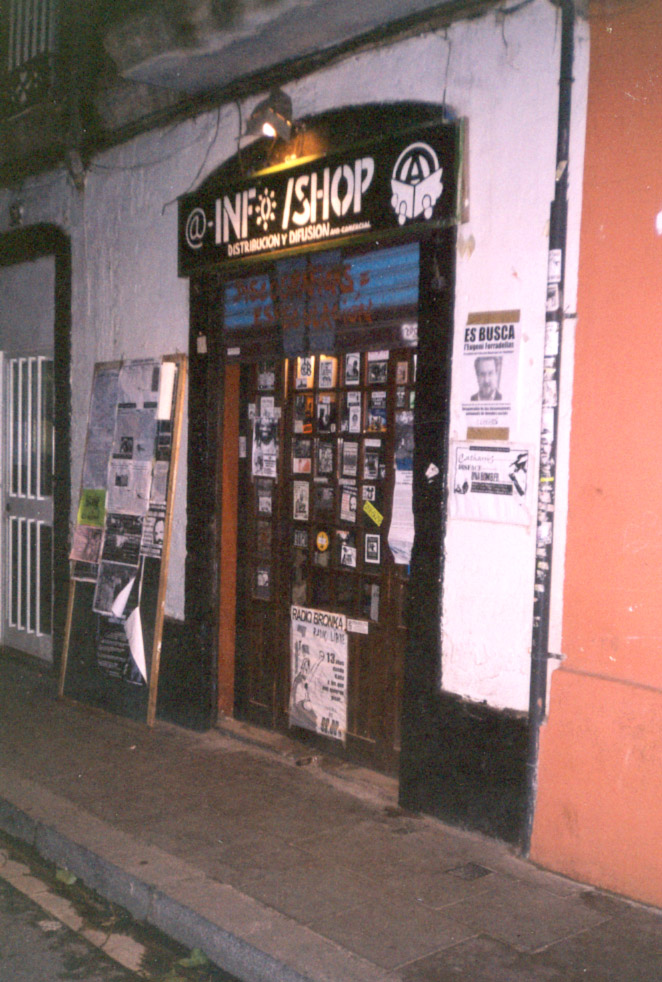
Street view of an infoshop in Barcelona

Infoshops are multi-functional spaces that disseminate alternative media and provide a forum for alternative cultural, economic, political, and social activities. Individual infoshops vary in features but can include a small library or reading room and serve as a distribution center for both free and priced/retail alternative media, particularly media with revolutionary anarchist politics. While infoshops can serve as a kind of community library, they are designed to meet the information needs of its users rather than to compete with the public library or pre-existing information centers. For alternative publishers and activist groups, infoshops can offer low-cost reprographic services for do-it-yourself publications, and provide a postal mail delivery address for those who cannot afford a post office box or receive mail at a squatted address. In the 1990s, available tools ranged from no-frills photocopiers to desktop publishing software. Besides these print publication functions, infoshops can also host meetings, discussions, concerts, or exhibitions. For instance, as activist video grew in the 1990s, infoshops screened films and hosted discussion groups that, in turn, encouraged debate and collective action. The infoshop attempts to offer a space where individuals can publish without the restrictions of the mainstream press and discuss alternative ideas unimpeded by homophobia, racism, and sexism.

Organized by political activists, infoshops are often independent, precariously self-funded, and unaffiliated with any organization or council. They too are often staffed by their own self-selected users as volunteers and like the anarchist media they distribute, operate on inexpensive, borrowed, or donated resources, such as secondhand computers and furniture. As a result, infoshops and other marginal institutions are often short-lived, with minimal income to pay their short-term leases on rented storefronts. Infoshops sometimes combine the function of other alternative venues: vegetarian cafés, independent record stores, head shops, and alternative bookstores. But foremost, infoshops disseminate information, serving as library, archive, distributor, retailer, and hub of an informal and ephemeral network of alternative organizations and activists.

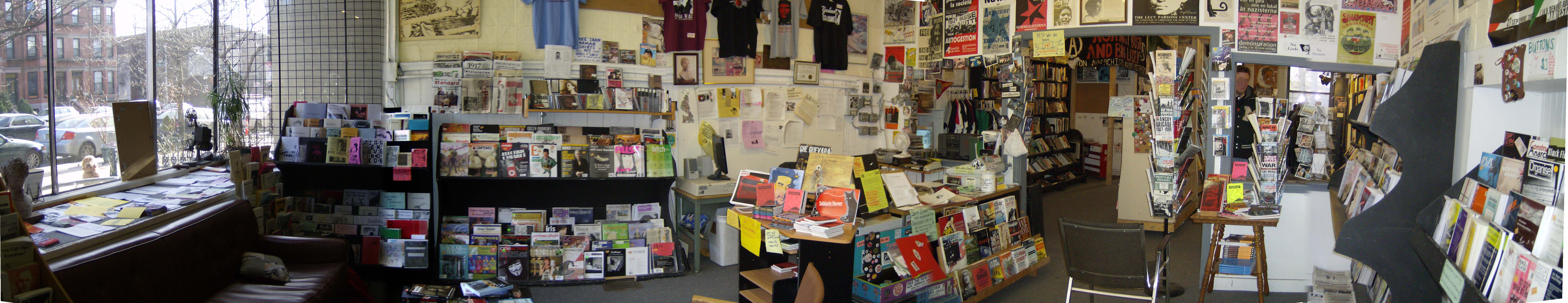
A panoramic view of the interior of the Lucy Parsons Center in Boston, United States.

== Free schools ==
Anarchists, in pursuit of freedom from dogma, believe that individuals must not be socialized into acceptance of authority or dogma as part of their education. In contrast to traditional schools, anarchist free schools are autonomous, nonhierarchical spaces intended for educational exchange and skillsharing. They do not have admittance criteria or subordinate relations between teacher and student. Free schools follow a loosely structured program that seeks to defy dominant institutions and ideologies under a nonhierarchical division of power and prefigure a more equitable world. Classes are run by volunteers and held in self-managed social centers, community centers, parks, and other public places.

Free schools follow in the anarchist education lineage from Spanish anarchist Francisco Ferrer's Escuela Moderna and resulting modern school movement in the early 1900s, through the predominantly American free school movement of the 1960s. The American anarchist Paul Goodman, who was prominent in this latter movement, advocated for small schools for children to be held in storefronts and to use the city as its classroom.

In one example, a free school in Toronto grew from the closure of a countercultural community café with the opening of an anarchist free space. It sought to share ideas about how to create anti-authoritarian social relations through a series of classes. All were invited to propose and attend classes, whose topics included: 1920s love songs, alternative economics, street art, critiques of patriarchy and how to combat violence against women. The longest running classes were those that introduced anarchism and related politics of syndicalism and libertarian socialism. The course instructors served as facilitators, providing texts and encouraging participation, rather than as top-down lectures. The free space also hosted art events, parties, and conversational forums. Other initiatives were short-lived or nonstarters, such as an anemic lending library and free used goods table. Another free school in Nottingham found skillshare-oriented classes with more traditional pedagogy more popular than sessions on radical education.

Similar to free schools, free university projects are run from college campuses most prominently in Europe. Organized by volunteer student collectives, participants in these initiatives experiment with the process of learning and are not designed to replace the traditional university.

== See also ==
- Halkevleri
- List of self-managed social centers
- People's House

== Bibliography ==
- Atton, Chris (February 1999). "The infoshop: the alternative information centre of the 1990s". New Library World. 100 (1146): 24–29. doi:10.1108/03074809910248564. ISSN 0307-4803.
- Atton, Chris (2003). "Infoshops in the Shadow of the State". In Couldry, Nick; Curran, James (eds.). Contesting Media Power: Alternative Media in a Networked World. Lanham, MD: Rowman & Littlefield. pp. 57–70. ISBN 978-0-7425-2385-2. OCLC 464358422.
- Atton, Chris (2010). Alternative Media. London: SAGE Publications. ISBN 978-0-7619-6770-5.
- Casaglia, Anna (2016). "Territories of Struggle: Social Centres in Northern Italy Opposing Mega-Events". Antipode. 50 (2): 478–497. doi:10.1111/anti.12287. hdl:11572/224064. ISSN 0066-4812. S2CID 151617152.
- Downing, John D. H. (2000). "Italy: Three Decades of Radical Media". Radical Media: Rebellious Communication and Social Movements. Thousand Oaks, California: SAGE Publications. pp. 266–298. ISBN 978-0-8039-5698-8.
- Franks, Benjamin; Kinna, Ruth (December 20, 2014). "Contemporary British Anarchism". Revue LISA. 12 (8). doi:10.4000/lisa.7128. ISSN 1762-6153.
- Klein, Naomi (June 8, 2001). "Squatters in White Overalls". The Guardian. ISSN 0261-3077.
- Lacey, Anita (August 2005). "Networked Communities: Social Centers and Activist Spaces in Contemporary Britain". Space and Culture. 8 (3): 286–301. Bibcode:2005SpCul...8..286L. doi:10.1177/1206331205277350. ISSN 1206-3312. S2CID 145336405.
- Neumann, Richard (2003). Sixties Legacy: A History of the Public Alternative Schools Movement, 1967–2001. New York: Peter Lang. ISBN 978-0-8204-6354-4. OCLC 878586437.
- Noterman, Elsa; Pusey, Andre (2012). "Inside, Outside, and on the Edge of the Academy: Experiments in Radical Pedagogies". In Haworth, Robert H (ed.). Anarchist Pedagogies: Collective Actions, Theories, and Critical Reflections on Education. Oakland, Calif.: PM Press. pp. 175–199. ISBN 978-1-60486-484-7. OCLC 841743121.
- Piazza, Gianni (2016). "Squatting Social Centres in a Sicilian City: Liberated Spaces and Urban Protest Actors". Antipode. 50 (2): 498–522. doi:10.1111/anti.12286. ISSN 0066-4812.
- Pusey, Andre (2010). "Social Centres and the New Cooperativism of the Common". Affinities: A Journal of Radical Theory, Culture, and Action. 4 (1): 176–198. OCLC 744314571.
- Shantz, Jeff (2010). "Anarchy Goes to School: The Anarchist Free Skool". Constructive Anarchy: Building Infrastructures of Resistance. Burlington, VT: Ashgate. pp. 135–. ISBN 978-1-4094-0402-6.
- Shantz, Jeff (2011). "Heterotopias of Toronto: The Anarchist Free Space and Who's Emma?". Active Anarchy: Political Practice in Contemporary Movements. Lanham, MD: Lexington Books. ISBN 978-0-7391-6613-0.
- Shantz, Jeffery (2012). "Spaces of Learning: The Anarchist Free Skool". In Haworth, Robert H (ed.). Anarchist Pedagogies: Collective Actions, Theories, and Critical Reflections on Education. Oakland, Calif.: PM Press. pp. 124–144. ISBN 978-1-60486-484-7. OCLC 841743121.
- Trapese Collective, ed. (2007). Do It Yourself: A handbook for changing our world. Pluto. ISBN 9780745326375.
- Webb, Maureen (March 10, 2020). Coding Democracy: How Hackers Are Disrupting Power, Surveillance, and Authoritarianism. MIT Press. ISBN 978-0-262-04355-7.
