= Anarchism in the Czech Republic =

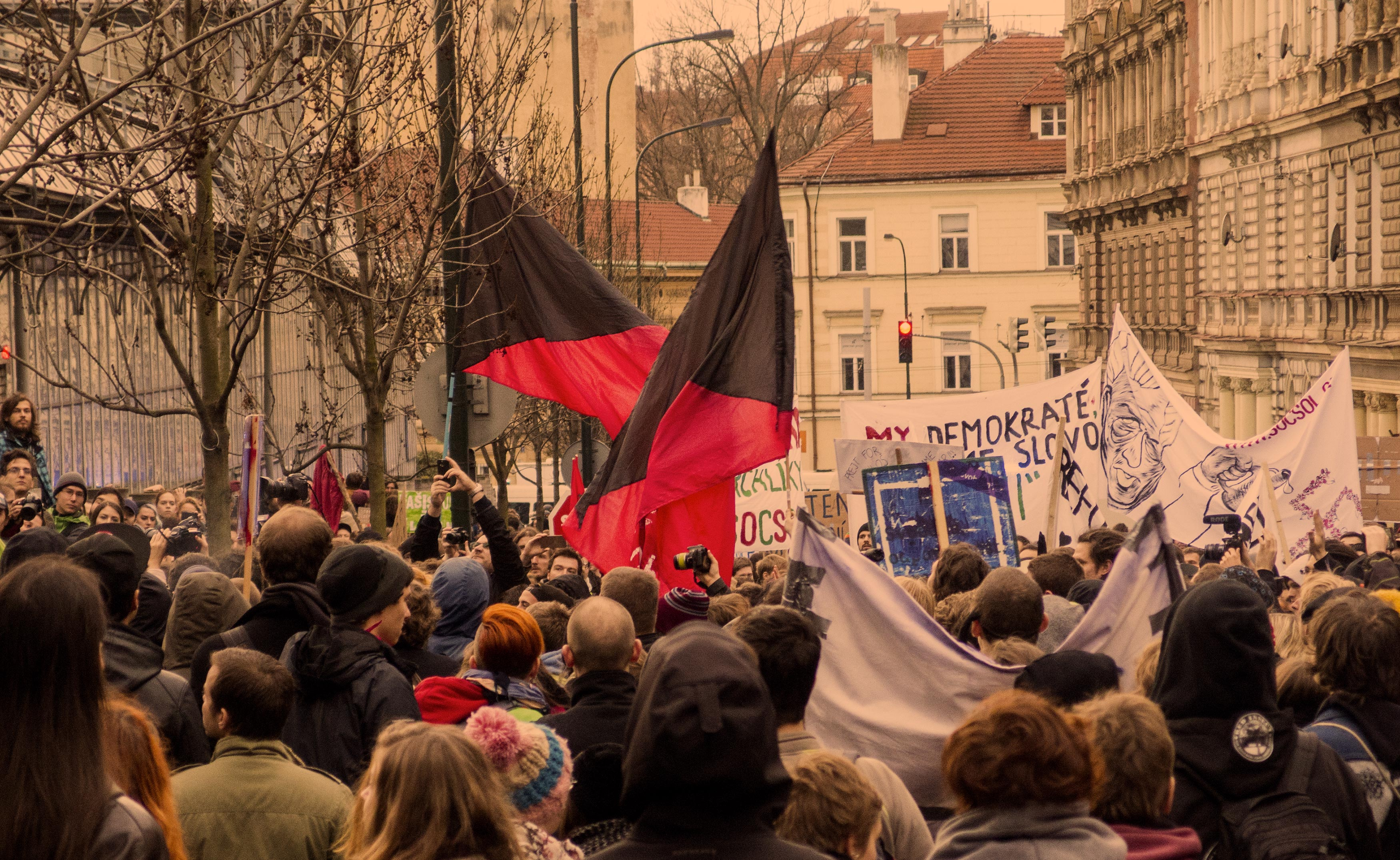
Anarchist demonstration in the Czech Republic on 5 February 2016

Anarchism in the Czech Republic is a political movement in the Czech Republic, with its roots in the Bohemian Reformation, which peaked in the early 20th century. It later dissolved into the nascent Czech communist movement, before seeing a resurgence after the fall of the Fourth Czechoslovak Republic in the Velvet Revolution.

== Precursors ==
Traces of anarchism can be seen at the beginning of the Hussite movement. The Hussites, inspired by the teachings of Jan Hus, held that all authority (including the Church) was unjustifiable because it did not follow God's laws. Hence they supported the rights of ordinary subjects to rebel and establish a "society of equals." Although the revolutionary Tábor did establish consumer communism in its beginnings, the authorities were not suppressed (on the contrary, Jan Žižka imposed an authoritative military order).

A radical faction, the so-called Adamites, separated from the Hussites. They believed that the kingdom of God had already come to pass, but that it would be established by men. They denied all authority, such as marriage, and instead exercised absolute freedom, including free love. Adamites and other followers of folk radicalism (historian Vladimír Liška refers to them as the "far left" of the movement) were gradually eliminated by the Hussites.

Side the Hussite movement, there was a religious thinker Petr Chelčický, who sympathized with the Hussite socially critical views, but rejected violence and armed struggle. He opposed the social hierarchy (the so-called "triple people"), criticized the Catholic and Hussite nobility and opposed the existence of states. As an early pacifist, Chelčický is considered to be a forerunner of Christian anarchism and anarcho-pacifism, his teachings were an influence on Leo Tolstoy.

Modern anarchists espouse the Hussites and Czech brothers as their predecessors, judging that "the ideas of the Czech revolutionaries of the fifteenth century were anarchist and communist in nature."

== Turn of the 20th century ==
The emergence of the anarchist movement in Bohemia and Moravia was closely connected with the split in the Czech Social Democratic Party. The moderate wing promoted parliamentarism and reformism as a peaceful path to socialism. The radicals, inspired by the ideas of Johann Most, instead called for an economic, collective and individual struggle. It was from this radical wing that the modern Czech anarchist movement emerged. On the pages of radical magazines and newspapers, "propaganda by deed" was promoted as a tactic. However, the issue of the using violence, which also provided a justification for state repression against the workers' movement, became the subject of debate in the anarchist movement over time.

During the 1890s, a form of so-called "independent socialism" prevailed in the movement. It built on absolute individual freedom and achieved a response in the student progressive movement. In 1896, the half-censored "Manifesto of Czech Anarchists" was published. In 1904, the "Czech Anarchist Federation" (CAF) was formed, which demanded the spread of anarchism between the working class and the intelligentsia. In the same year, the "Czech Federation of Trade Unions" (CFVO) was founded, based on the principles of anarcho-syndicalism and the political neutrality of trade unions. The CFVO was officially banned in 1908. In 1914, the creation of a "Czech Anarchist Communist Party" was discussed among anarchists, but this idea was largely rejected. Instead, the Czech Anarchist Federation was transformed into the Federation of Czech Anarchist Communists (FČAK).

== First Republic ==
Many anarchists took part in resistance activities against Austria-Hungary, which in turn led to the creation of the First Czechoslovak Republic. But experiences during the First World War and subsequent political developments led most of the anarchist movement in the Czech Republic to revise their political views and practices. They adopted a vision of joining a revolutionary-based political party. Many anarchists, especially Bohuslav Vrbenský and the union leaders of North Bohemian miners, established closer cooperation with representatives of the Czech National Social Party (ČSNS). In February 1919, the liquidation congress of the Federation of Czech Communist Anarchists (FČAK) took place, which agreed to merge with the ČSNS.

By the mid-1920s, Czech anarchism had lost its momentum, owing to the increased influence of Marxism-Leninism over the Czech social movement. The group that formed around Stanislav Kostka Neumann established contacts with the Communist International and participated in the founding of the Communist Party of Czechoslovakia. However, after the 5th Congress of the Communist Party in 1929, Neumann and his companions were expelled for releasing the Manifesto of the Seven, in which they protested against the Bolshevization of the party.

== After 1989 ==
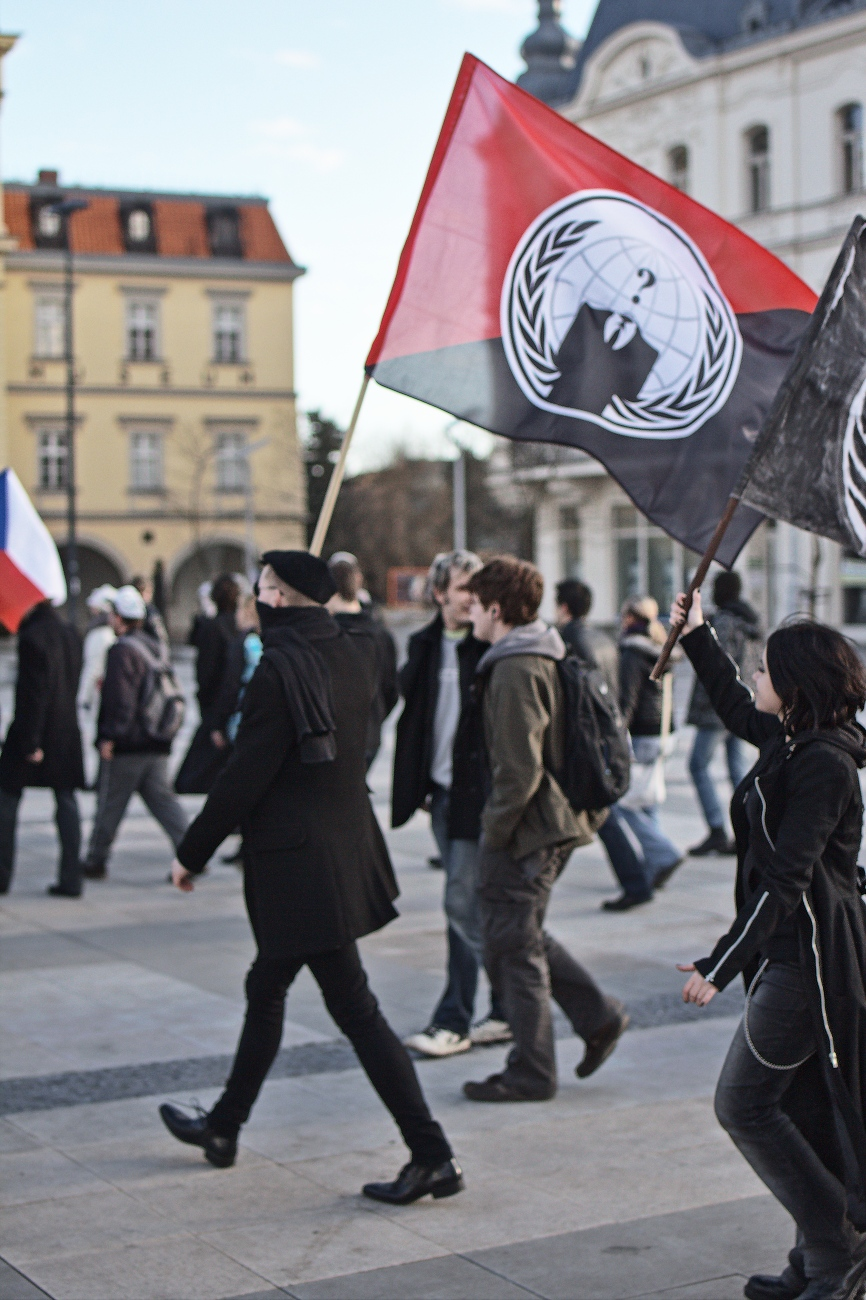
Anarchists in the Czech Republic

The Czechoslovak Anarchist Association was established in the 1980s, even before the Velvet Revolution. After the revolution and the fall of the Fourth Czechoslovak Republic, other organizations began to appear. During the 1990s, the Federation of Social Anarchists, Federation of Anarchist Groups and Czechoslovak Anarchist Federation were formed. Ladronka was squatted by anarchists in 1993 and became a self-managed social centre. Other squats which followed in the tradition of Ladronka included Milada and Klinika.

By the 2010s, there were several other anarchist organizations and groups in the Czech Republic, including those operating internationally, such as Antifa, Anarchist Black Cross, Anarcho-Communist alternative, Food Not Bombs, Animal Liberation Front and Voice of Anarchopacifism.

== See also ==
- Category:Czech anarchists
- List of anarchist movements by region
- Anarchism in Austria

== Bibliography ==
- Heller, Jakub (9 January 2019). "Ladronka, Milada či Klinika. Připomeňte si známé squaty a jejich neslavné konce [Ladronka, Milada and Klinika: Remembering the famous squats and their infamous endings]". Aktuálně (in Czech).
- Liška, Vladimír (2004). Hussites – the end of a myth? (in Czech). Fontána. ISBN 80-7336-162-0.
- Mareš, Miroslav (10 September 2014). Extremism in the Czech Republic: Anarchism and the Autonomists (in Czech). National Institute for Education.
- Bastl, Martin; Mareš, Miroslav; Smolík, Josef (2011). Petra Vejvodová: Far Right and Far Left in the Czech Republic (in Czech). Prague: Grada Publishing.
- Mikolášová, Darina (2009). Anarchism and culture (Master's) (in Czech). Faculty of Arts, Charles University in Prague.
- Pixová, Michaela (15 November 2019). Contested Czech Cities: From Urban Grassroots to Pro-democratic Populism. Springer Nature. ISBN 978-981-329-709-8.
- Tomek, Václav (1996). Czech anarchism 1890–1925 (in Czech). Prague: Filosofia. ISBN 978-80-7007-080-2.
- Tomek, Václav (2002). Czech anarchism and its journalism 1880-1925 (in Czech). Prague: Filosofia. ISBN 978-80-7007-165-6.
- Tomek, Václav; Slačálek, Ondej (2006). Anarchism: freedom against power (in Czech). Praha: Vyehrad. ISBN 978-80-7021-781-8. OCLC 690414542.
