= Squatting in the Czech Republic =

Occupation of unused land or derelict buildings in the Czech Republic

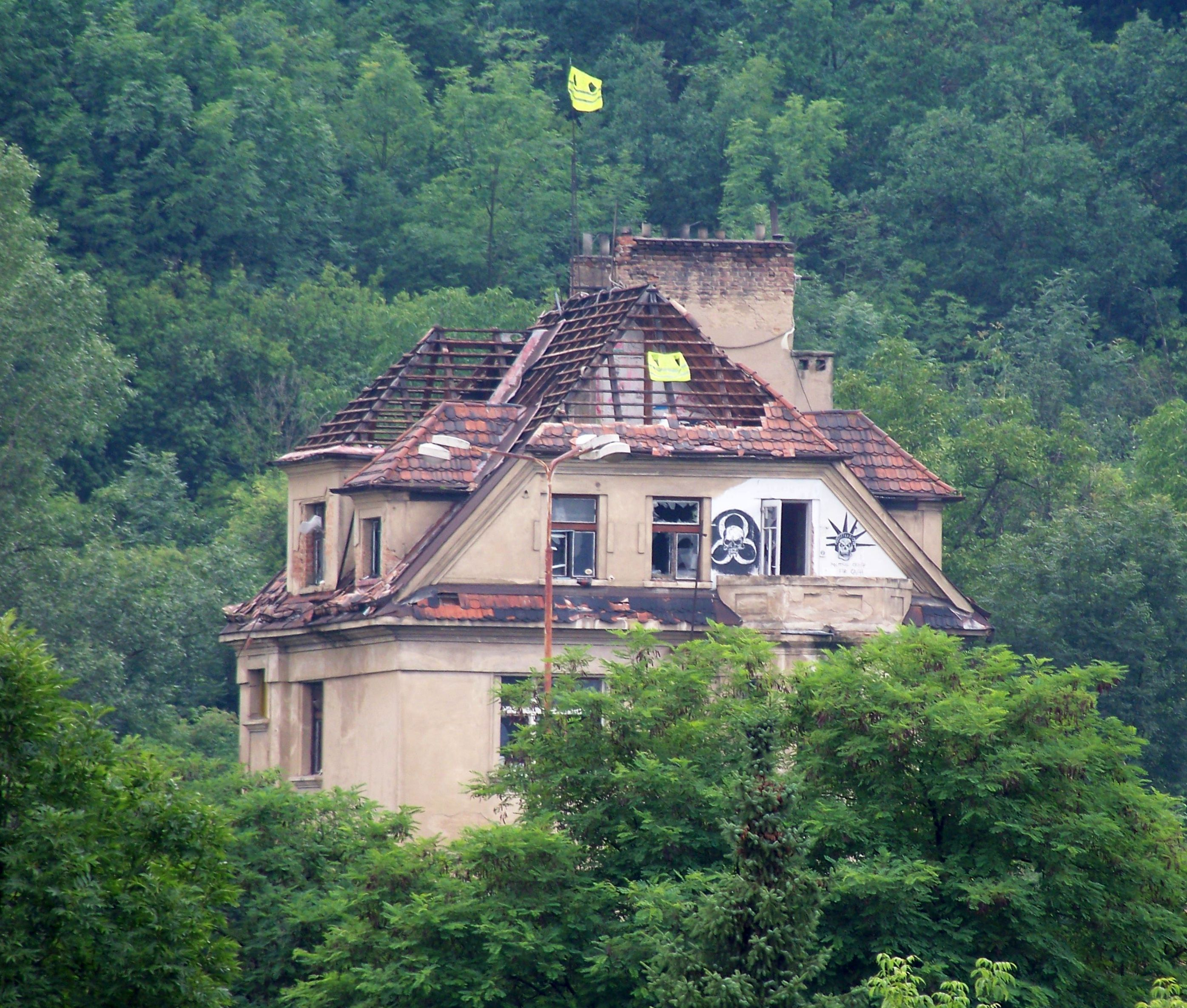
Squat Milada after eviction (2009)

Squatting (the occupation of unused property without the permission of the owner) became a political phenomenon in the Czech Republic after the Velvet Revolution in 1989. Squats in Prague included Sochora (an infoshop), Stary Střešovice (a cultural project) and Ladronka (an anarchist self-managed social centre). Milada was occupied in 1998 and following its final eviction in 2009, there was a lull in squatting actions. In the 2010s a new social movement (Obsaď a Žij) squatted houses to highlight the number of derelict properties in Prague and the social centre Klinika was founded in 2014.

== Communism ==
After World War II, Czechoslovakia became a communist state. There was no organised squatting movement, only people occupying derelict spaces as a place to live in times of desperation. Private property was protected by article 249a of the Czech Criminal Code, established in 1961.

== Post-communism ==
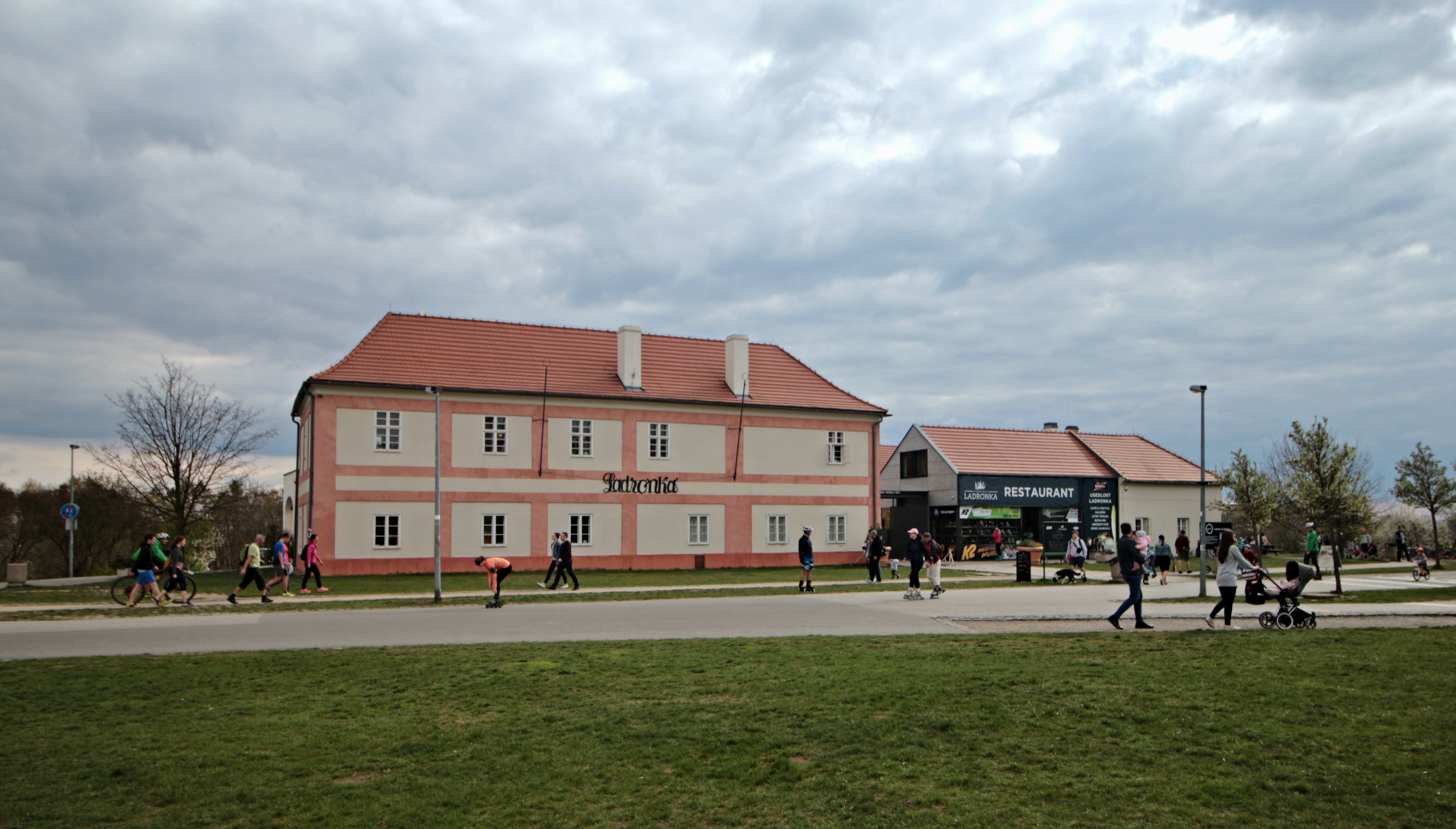
Ladronka in 2019

Following the Velvet Revolution in 1989, squats appeared in cities across Czechoslovakia. In Prague, anarchist and punk activists inspired by squatting movements in Amsterdam and also Berlin occupied derelict houses. In the Holešovice district anarchists squatted a building at Pplk. Sochora street, setting up an infoshop. The squat was attacked several times by neo-Nazis and cleared by police in December 1992, then re-squatted several weeks later; by 1997, the infoshop had achieved legalisation, albeit being settled in a different, smaller building. Other occupations in Prague included Zlatá loď (1990–1994) and Buďánka (1991–1992).

The early 1990s were a golden age for squatting in the Czech Republic, since following the breakdown of state communism there was a period of fluidity before the state reasserted itself. Ladronka was occupied in 1993 and became a self-managed social centre. It was evicted in the furore following the 2000 anti-globalization protests in Prague. In Střešovice in Prague 6, artists occupied three houses in 1998 and reinstituted the Medák association, putting on cultural events under the name of Stary Střešovice. The district council offered them a lease on one of the houses but the association refused, saying it needed more space. The association was later evicted in 2003. Papirna in Holešovice existed from 1997 until 2004.

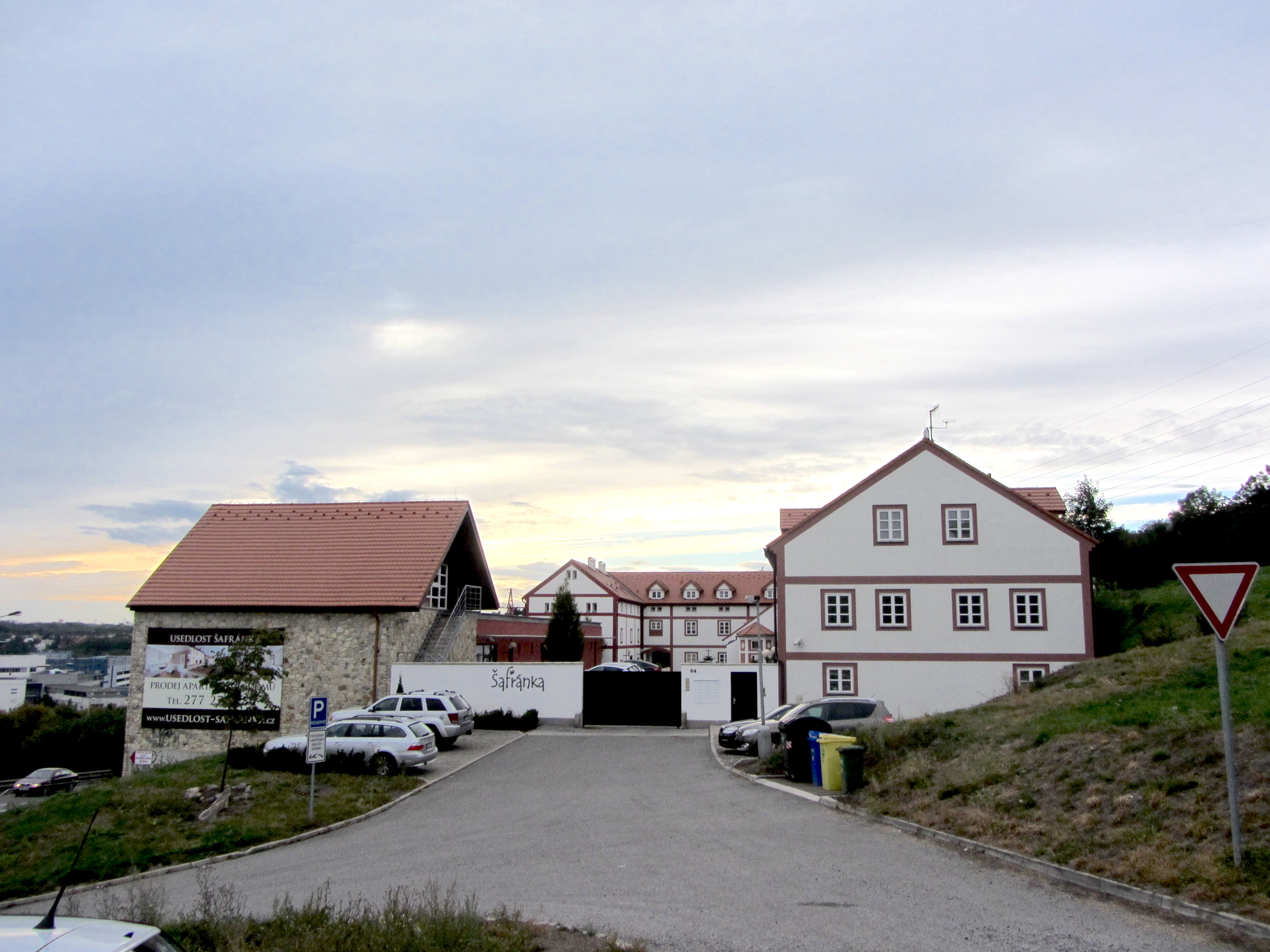
Šafránka in 2012

On May Day 1998, anarchist activists from Ladronka occupied Milada, a derelict villa in Libeň. A Food Not Bombs collective cooked there and the space was used for meetings and punk gigs. As with Ladronka, the aims of the original collective faded, then in 2007 Milada was reinvigorated by new, younger participants, before being finally cleared in 2009. In the summer of 2002, activists occupied Šafránka in Prague 6. This homestead had been proposed as a replacement for Ladronka in 1997 and then stayed empty. Upon being threatened with eviction the squatters moved to the roof for two weeks.

== 2010s ==
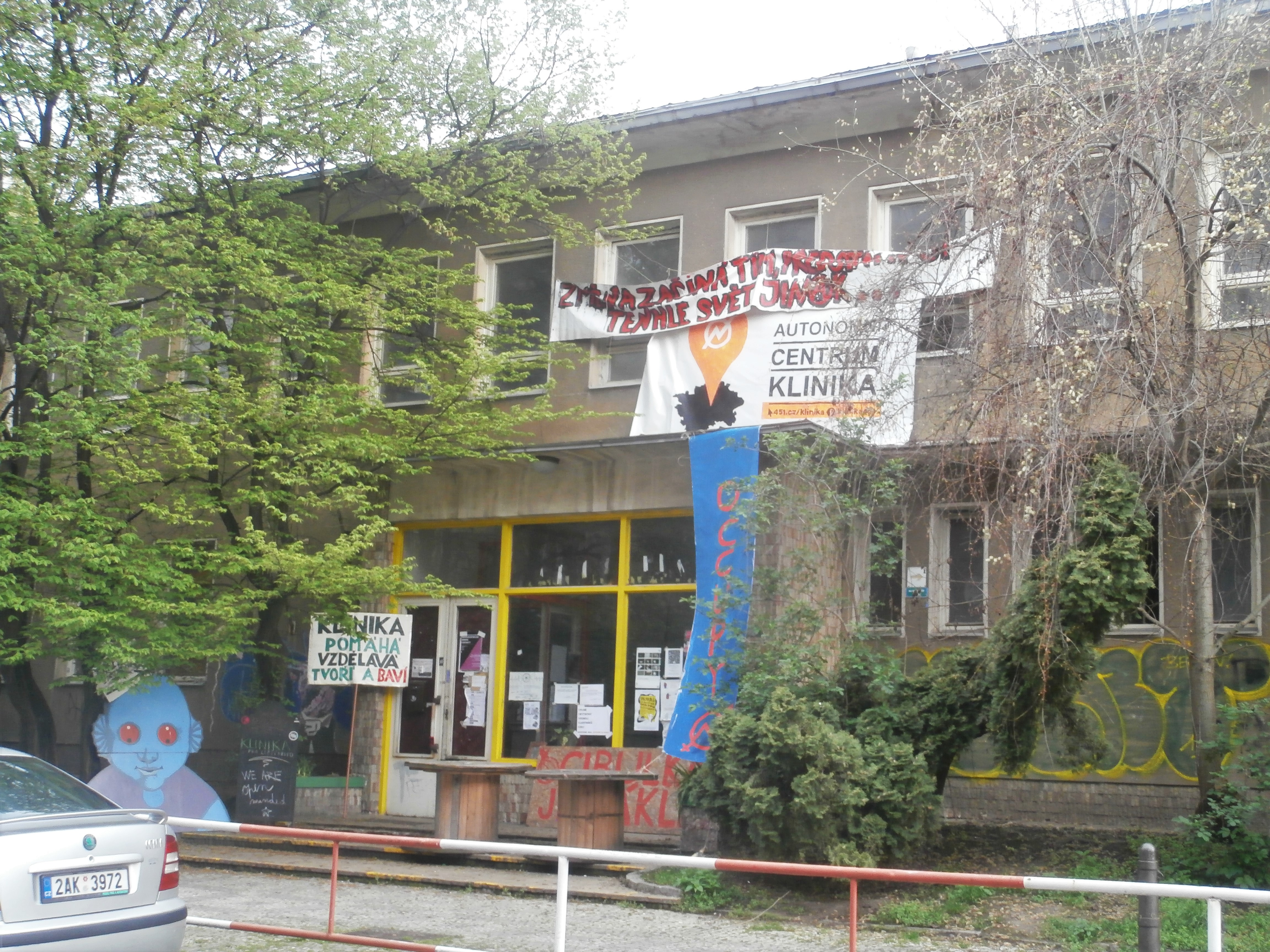
Klinika in 2016

In the 2010s, most squatting actions continued to be in Prague, although there were also squatted projects in for example Olomouc.

Cibulka in Prague is a derelict homestead constructed in the 14th-century which has been occupied several times since the 1990s. In 2007 the villa was reoccupied and then emptied after a fight in which three police officers and four squatters were injured. It was reoccupied again in 2012 and the owner granted permission for the squatters to live there, only to withdraw the licence in 2015, when the building was again evicted.

To mark the twentieth anniversary of the eviction of Ladronka, the group Vzpominky na budoucnost (Memories of the Future) occupied empty houses in 2013. The buildings were all quickly cleared and the actions gave rise to the movement Obsaď a Žij (Occupy and Live), which then for the next two years occupied derelict properties in order to provoke a discussion concerning housing in Prague. For the first time since the early 1990s, the mainstream media reacted positively to the symbolic actions, in particular supporting a day-long occupation of an empty building owned by billionaire real estate investor Radovan Vítek.

Klinika, a former medical centre in Žižkov, Prague, was occupied in November 2014. It was almost immediately evicted, but after demonstrations were held in support and celebrities backed the project, it was granted a one-year contract by the Finance Minister, Andrej Babiš. After the contract expired, Klinika was not given up and thus became squatted again. The centre organised a community laundry, a kindergarten, an infoshop, migrant support and benefit gigs. It was finally evicted in 2019. Ladronka, Milada and Klinika are the longest lasting and most influential squats in the Czech Republic.
