= Michael Kácha =

Czech anarchist, journalist and publisher (1874–1940)

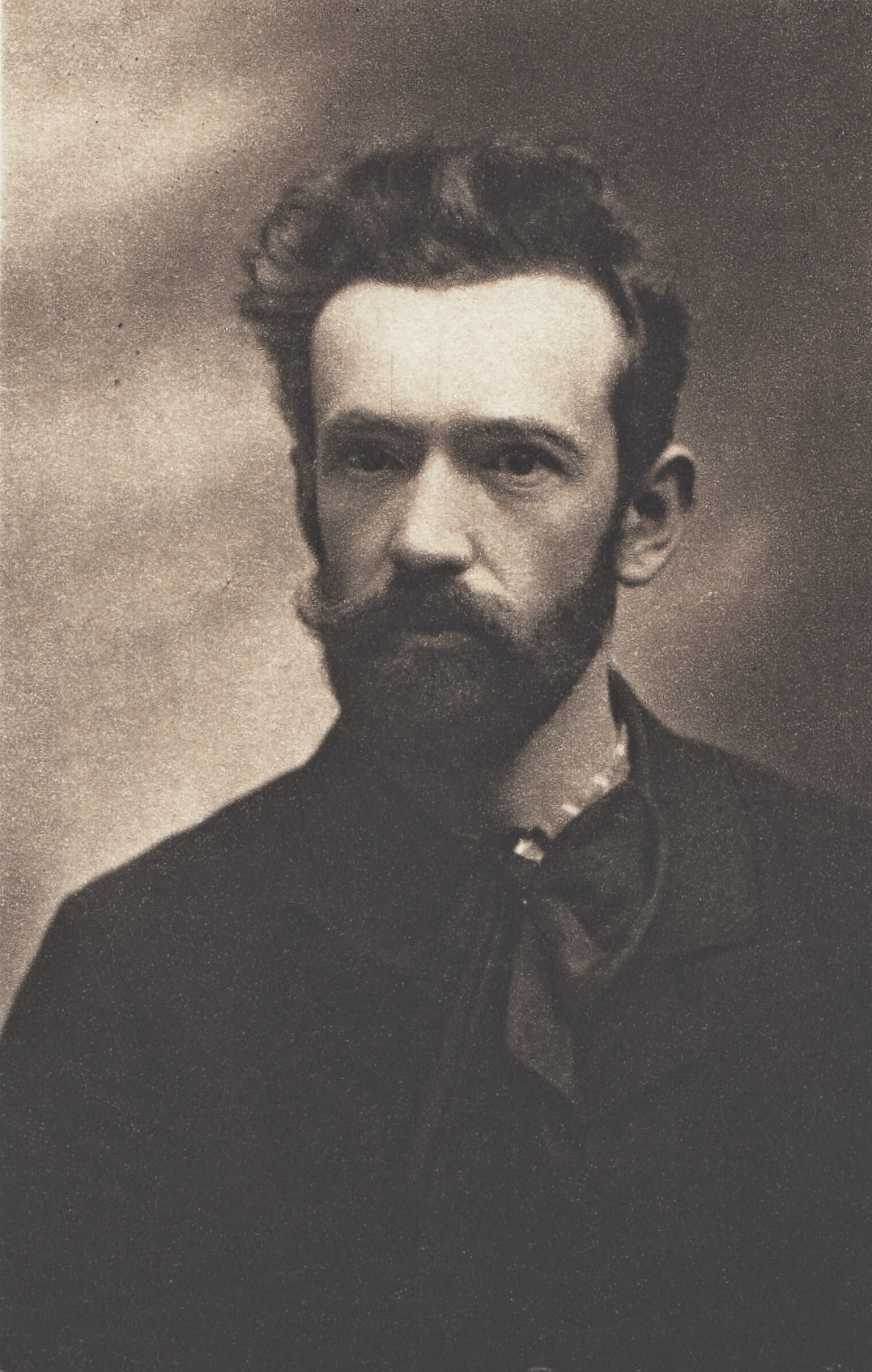
- Portrait of Kácha prior to 1925
- Born: 6 January 1874; Prague, Austria-Hungary
- Died: 12 May 1940 (aged 66); Prague, Protectorate of Bohemia and Moravia
- Resting place: Olšany Cemetery
- Occupations: Journalist, publisher
- Movement: Anarchism

Michael Kácha (6 January 1874 – 12 May 1940) was a Czech anarchist activist, journalist and publisher. He was a founder of the Czech Anarchist Federation and edited numerous publications during the 1900s. He then led the fundamentalist faction of the federation against Bohuslav Vrbenský's proposals to transform it into a political party, but his counter-proposals were voted down. He was arrested several times during World War I. After the war, he returned to publishing and met the young writer Franz Kafka, who his left-wing magazine Červen. He published his own collected works in 1933, seven years before his death at the outbreak of World War II.

== Biography ==
Michael Kácha was born in 1874. He worked as a shoemaker and came to believe in the political philosophy of anarchism, as advocated by Peter Kropotkin. In the early 20th century, the Czech anarchist movement experienced a surge of activity. This process culminated in 1904, with the establishment of the Czech Anarchist Federation by a group of Kropotkinites, including Kácha and Stanislav Kostka Neumann. Anarchist publishing activities also expanded during this time, with Kácha himself publishing the weekly newspaper Práce from 1905 to 1908. He also published a journal of anarchist children's literature, Klíčení (Germination). He also mentored the young anarchist writer Kamill Resler, who remembered him as a father figure. In 1908, the Austro-Hungarian authorities suppressed the anarchist movement, but Czech anarchists soon reorganised around the rising anti-militarist and anti-clericalist movements. Kácha himself returned to publishing, editing the journal Zádruha from 1909 to 1914.

By the spring of 1914, the Czech Anarchist Federation had reformed, but it quickly split into two ideologically-opposed factions. The leader of its "realist" faction, Bohuslav Vrbenský, proposed that anarchists organise themselves into a political party. Kácha, as the leader of its "fundamentalist" faction, sharply criticised Vrbenský's programme, which he believed to contradict anarchist principles. Drawing from the work of Voltairine de Cleyre, Kácha worried that any anarchist political party would uphold mediation rather than undertaking direct action. He considered political party structures to be inherently based on systems of hierarchy and authoritarianism. Believing that anarchist principles had to be "felt" by its followers, he warned that Vrbenský's proposal would set the precedent for "future compromises" and a move towards centralisation. He also criticised Vrbenský's programme for upholding nationalism, depicting it as having taken a sentimental approach towards minority nationalities in Czech lands. Kácha defended a classical form of anarchism, against Vrbenský's attempts to make anarchist politically relevant for their contemporary conditions.

At the Federation's Easter Congress, Vrbenský's political programme was approved by a large majority, despite Kácha's objections. The organisation was subsequently reorganised into the Federation of Czech Anarchist Communists, but its activities were soon interrupted by the outbreak of World War I. Immediately after the war began, Kácha and Vrbenský were both arrested and imprisoned, forcing the Federation to dissolve again. Later in the war, Kácha became co-edidtor of the anarchist journal Omladina, working alongside Fráňa Šrámek. In 1916, he was again arrested after publishing a satirical poem by Jan Opolský alongside an article about the Paris Commune, which resulted in the journal being shut down after only a few issues.

After the war ended and the First Czechoslovak Republic was established, the Czech anarchist movement again began to reorganise. Many anarchists joined the Czech National Social Party and, in February 1919, an anarchist congress adopted the party's libertarian socialist programme. Kácha tacitly supported anarchists joining the party, but called for them to maintain their anarchist principles and asset their influence in the new party. Many of the anarchists who joined quickly became disillusioned with the party, but instead of returning to anarchism, they formed the nucleus for the nascent Communist Party of Czechoslovakia.

Kácha himself returned to publishing and established an anarchist printing house in Prague. In 1919, he began working on the left-wing magazine Červen as its co-editor; in 1921, he was promoted to its editor-in-chief. The magazine would become a key source of inspiration for the writer Franz Kafka, who Kácha met with in the Klub Mladých. According to Max Brod, Kácha liked Kafka and referred to him as a "close-mouth", due to the writer largely kept quiet during their meetings. In 1933, Kácha published a book by Valerie Horb which analysed the international rise of antisemitism. He also published his own collected works that same year. Kácha died on 12 May 1940 in Prague and was buried at Prague's Olšany Cemetery. Kamill Resler gave the eulogy at his funeral and wrote a biography about his life and work. In the wake of World War II, the Czech anarchist Josef Mareš adopted the name "Michal", in honour of Michael Kácha.

== Bibliography ==
- Butler, Peter (2015). Beyond Decadence: Exposing the Narrative Irony in Jan Opolský's Prose. Karolinum Press. ISBN 9788024625713.
- Chitnis, Rajendra (2012). "'Moral Limits': The Expression and Suppression of Guilt in Czech Post-War Writing About the Borderlands". Central Europe. 10 (1): 18–54. doi:10.1179/1479096312Z.0000000002.
- Cohn, Jesse (2011). ""Don't Trust Anybody, Not Even Us": Kafka's Realism as Anarchist Modernism". Studies in 20th & 21st Century Literature. 35 (2): 296–315. doi:10.4148/2334-4415.1752.
- Drápal, Jakub (2018). Defending Nazis in Postwar Czechoslovakia. Karolinum Press. ISBN 9788024637303.
- Gillgren, Peter (2019). "Felix Horb: Notes in the margins of Max Dvořák, Hans Sedlmayr and Erwin Panofsky" (PDF). Journal of Art Historiography (21): 1–13. ISSN 2042-4752.
- Melis, Rachel (2011). "Kácha, Michal (1874–1940)". In Ness, Immanuel (ed.). International Encyclopedia of Revolution and Protest. doi:10.1002/9781405198073.wbierp1785.
- Nekula, Marek (2016). Franz Kafka and his Prague Contexts. Karolinum Press. ISBN 9788024629353.
- Rovná, Lenka Anna (2013). "Peter Kropotkin and His Influence on Czech Anarchism". Moving the Social. 50: 53–79. doi:10.13154/mts.50.2013.53-79.
- Slačálek, Ondřej; Polák, Michael (2024). "The Story of Czech Anarchism: Ideas and Practices of Czech Libertarians, 1883‐1930". Anarchist Studies. 32 (2): 15–43. doi:10.3898/AS.32.2.02. ISSN 0967-3393.
- Trencsényi, Balázs; Janowski, Maciej; Baar, Monika; Falina, Maria; Kopecek, Michal (2016). A History of Modern Political Thought in East Central Europe. Vol. 1. Oxford University Press. ISBN 978-0-19-105695-6.
