= Socialist Association =

Socialist Association Socialistické sjednocení
- Leaders: Bohuslav Vrbenský; Vilém Brodecký
- Founded: 1923
- Dissolved: 1924
- Newspaper: Socialista
- Ideology: Socialism; Radicalism; Anarcho-communism
- Political position: Left-wing
- International affiliation: Labour and Socialist International
- Members: Independent Socialist Workers' Party; Independent Radical Social Democratic Party

The Socialist Association (Czech: Socialistické sjednocení) was a union of two political parties in Czechoslovakia, the Independent Socialists of Bohuslav Vrbenský and the Independent Radical Social Democratic Party of Vilém Brodecký. The Socialist Association was founded on March 23, 1923, by the fusion of the parliamentary factions of the two groups. The two groups, representing a combined membership of around 15,000, were set to merge but Brodecký's group decided to merge with the Czechoslovak Social Democratic Workers Party instead in 1924. The Independent Socialists, renamed the Independent Socialist Workers Party in June 1924, merged with the Communist Party of Czechoslovakia in September 1925.

Vrbenský was the chairman of the Socialist Association. The daily newspaper Socialista was the organ of the organization.

The Socialist Association was a member of the Labour and Socialist International between 1923 and 1925.
