= Luisa Landová-Štychová =

Czech astronomer and politician (1885–1969)

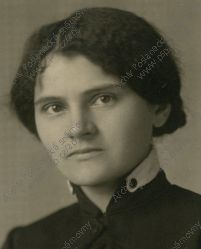

Member of the Chamber of Deputies
- In office 1920–1923
- In office 1925–1929

Personal details
- Born: Aloisie Vorlíčková; 31 January 1885 Ratboř, Austria-Hungary
- Died: 31 August 1969 (aged 84) Prague, Czechoslovakia

Luisa Landová-Štychová (31 January 1885 – 31 August 1969) was a Czechoslovak politician, feminist, educator and astronomer. In 1920 she was one of the first group of women elected to the Chamber of Deputies.

== Biography ==
Landová-Štychová was born Aloisie Vorlíčková in Ratboř in 1885, the daughter of a bakery owner. She was educated at a monastic school and attended a business academy. She subsequently worked as a correspondent for a jewelry company in Vienna, where she met Jaroslav Štych. Having refused to take over her father's business, she instead joined the worker's movement. She changed her surname to Landová (her grandmothers' maiden name) and married Štych in 1912. In 1907 she participated in anarchist anti-military protests and became a member of the Czech Anarchist Federation, speaking about radical feminist views. Together with Štych, she co-founded the atheist and social democratic Union of Socialist Monists in 1913, which was banned during World War I. She also became involved with the Federation of Czech Anarcho-Communists and was placed under police surveillance during the war. In 1918, the anarcho-communists decided to merge into the Czech National Social Party, which was renamed the Czech Socialist Party.

Landová-Štychová was involved in organising a general strike for 14 October 1918, which turned into a mass pro-independence demonstration. From 1918 to 1920 she was a member of the Revolutionary National Assembly. She was subsequently a candidate for the renamed Czechoslovak Socialist Party for the Chamber of Deputies in the 1920 parliamentary elections, and was one of sixteen women elected to parliament. She attempted to pass a law legalising abortion, but was unable to gain sufficient support. Tensions between the anarcho-communists and original National Social party members festered, and in March 1923 Landová-Štychová and three others were expelled from the party for failing to vote for a law for the protection of the republic. She was subsequently stripped of her seat in the Chamber in June.

The expelled anarcho-communists formed the Independent Socialist Workers Party, and Landová-Štychová represented the party on Prague City Council as a replacement for Bohuslav Vrbenský. The new party merged into the Communist Party of Czechoslovakia in 1925 and she was elected back to the Chamber of Deputies in the November 1925 elections, serving in parliament until 1929. After World War II her political activity largely ceased and she became more deeply involved with the Czechoslovak Astronomical Society, becoming vice chair of its committee in 1945 and serving on the editorial board of the astronomy magazine Říše hvězd. From 1952 she was vice president of the Czechoslovak Society for the Dissemination of Political and Scientific Knowledge, and in 1959 she was appointed an honorary member of the Czechoslovak Academy of Sciences. She died in Prague in 1969.
