= Klinika =

Evicted self-managed project in Prague, Czech Republic

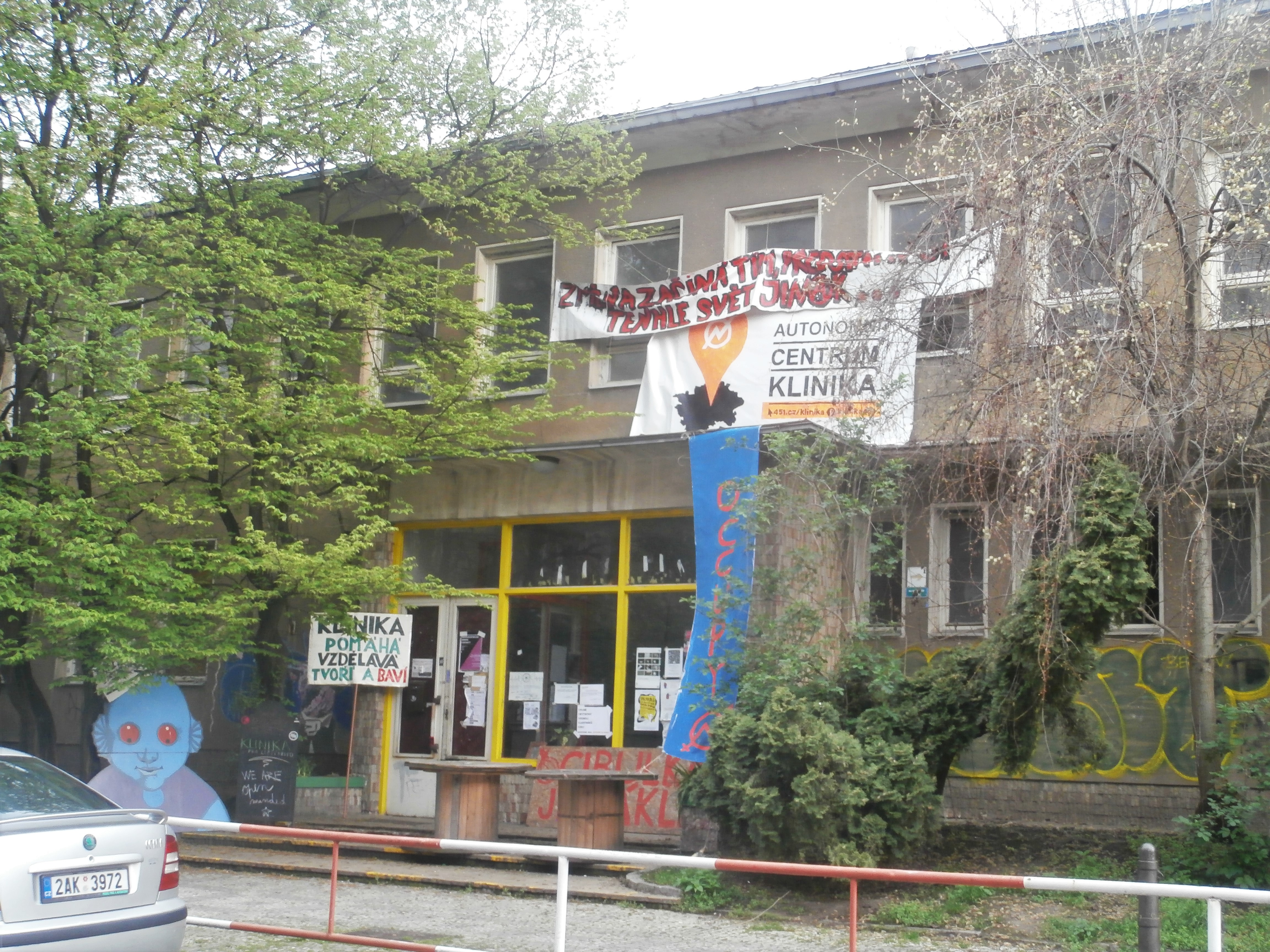
- Entrance to Klinika in 2016
- Interactive map of the Klinika area

General information
- Status: Evicted squat
- Location: Jeseniova 60, Prague, Czech Republic
- Coordinates: 50.0877775°N 14.4663731°E
- Opened: 2014
- Closed: 2019

Website
- klinika.451.cz/english

Klinika was a squatted self-managed social centre in Žižkov, Prague, from 2014 until 2019. It followed in the tradition of anarchist projects such as Ladronka and Milada.

== Occupation ==
The building was first occupied in 2014 as part of a housing rights demonstration. It was quickly evicted. A campaign then began which resulted in the Finance Minister offering a one-year rent-free contract, which began on March 2, 2015. When the contract was not prolonged, the centre simply reverted to being squatted again after a solidarity demonstration of 2,000 people. In 2016 the owner, the Office for Government Representation in Property Affairs (Úřad pro zastupování státu ve věcech majetkových – ÚZSVM), claimed the centre needed to be evicted because it was required for a different use, although no permits had been issued.

== Activities ==
Klinika was used by many different groups. It had a concert space, infoshop, library, bar and a large garden. Regular events included a community laundry, a creche, language lessons and solidarity events.

== Temporary closure ==
After demonstrations both for and against migration on February 6, 2016, Klinika was attacked by a group of neo-Nazis. The next day there was a solidarity demonstration attended by 400 people. A spokesperson for the project said “We sent 150 carloads of clothes and other things to Hungary, Croatia, Serbia – wherever we could help. We don’t have many refugees in the Czech Republic, so Klinika acts as a lightning rod for the anger in Czech society towards them.” A court ruling then closed the centre but on appeal it was reopened again after a few weeks.

== Eviction ==
The centre was evicted in January 2019, despite the political support of Czech Young Greens and Democracy in Europe Movement 2025. Unlike previous evictions, this time the building was then secured and not resquatted. The authorities calculated the cost of the eviction as 1,640,000 Czech crowns (64,400 euros) and are attempting to recover the money from a member of the collective.
