= Opočnice =

- Municipality
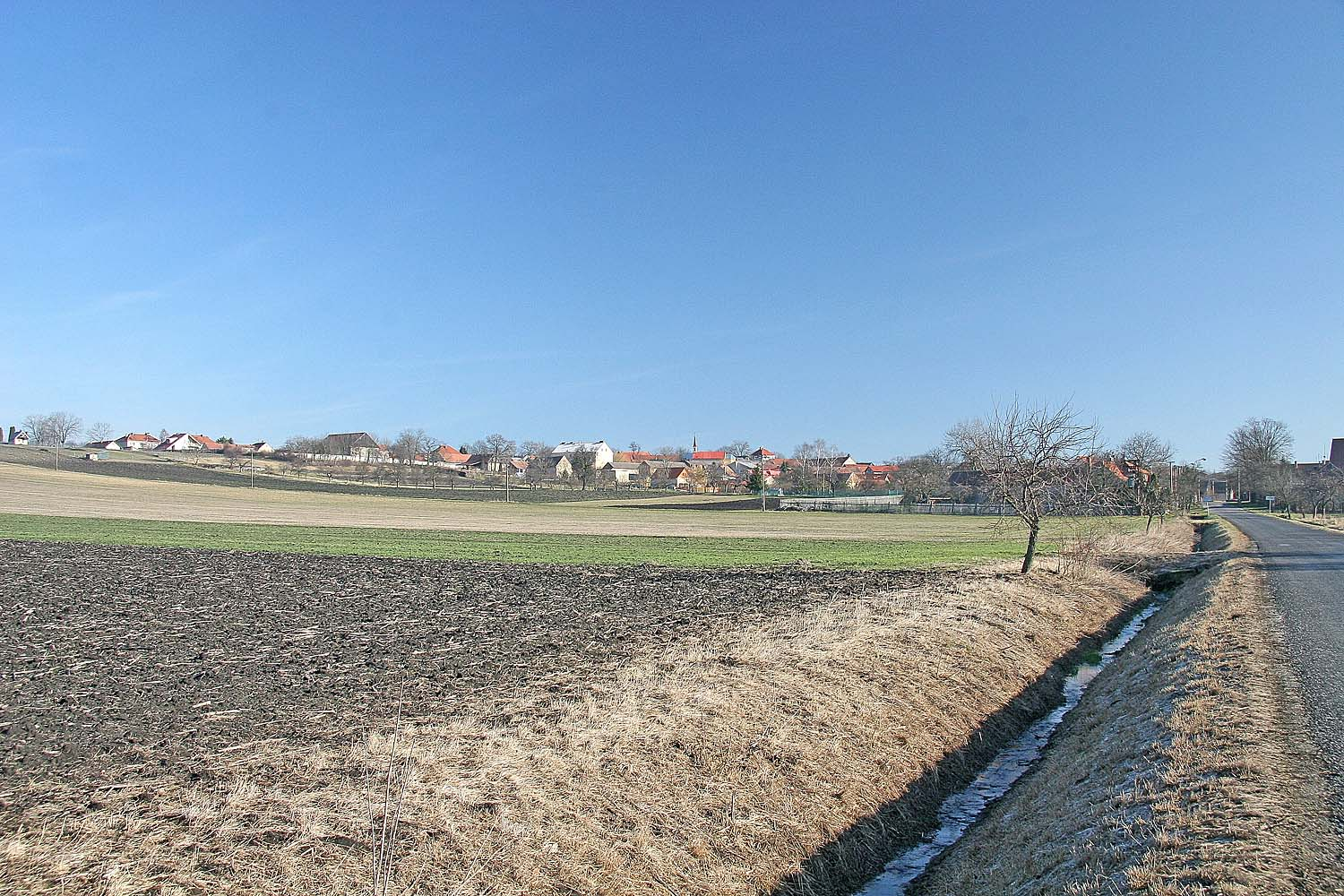
- View from the west

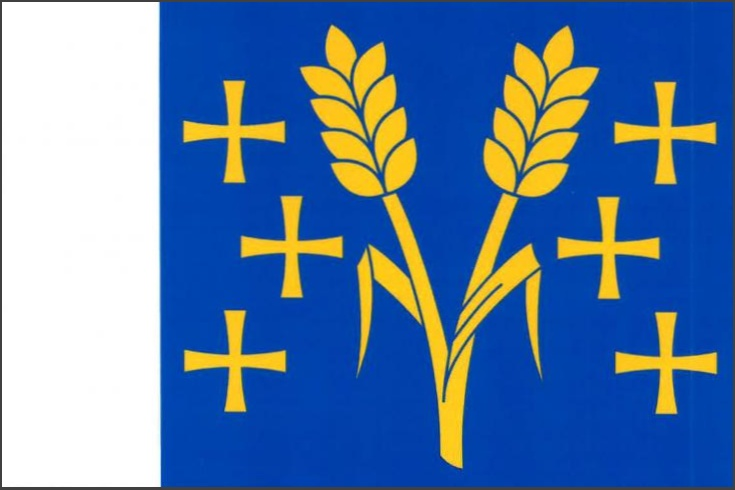
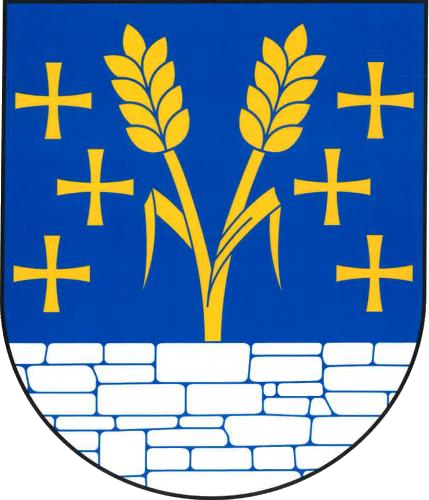
- Flag Coat of arms

- Location in the Czech Republic
- Coordinates: 50°10′21″N 15°15′28″E
- Country: Czech Republic
- Region: Central Bohemian
- District: Nymburk
- First mentioned: 1233

Area
  - Total: 10.30 km^{2} (3.98 sq mi)
- Elevation: 224 m (735 ft)

Population (2026-01-01)
  - Total: 479
  - Density: 46.5/km^{2} (120/sq mi)
- Time zone: UTC+1 (CET)
  - Summer (DST): UTC+2 (CEST)
- Postal code: 289 04
- Website: www.ouopocnice.cz

Opočnice is a municipality and village in Nymburk District in the Central Bohemian Region of the Czech Republic. It has about 500 inhabitants.

== Demographics ==
Historical population
Year	Pop.	±%
1869	825	—
1880	955	+15.8%
1890	960	+0.5%
1900	914	−4.8%
1910	951	+4.0%
1921	894	−6.0%
1930	791	−11.5%
1950	662	−16.3%
1961	654	−1.2%
1970	576	−11.9%
1980	513	−10.9%
1991	450	−12.3%
2001	393	−12.7%
2011	443	+12.7%
2021	437	−1.4%
Source: Censuses

== Notable people ==
- Bohuslav Vrbenský (1882–1944), politician
