= Independent Socialist Workers Party =

The Independent Socialist Party (Czech: Neodvislá socialistická strana) was a political party in Czechoslovakia. The party was founded in March 1923. The party included a number of former anarchists, who had joined the Czech Socialist Party in 1918. They had however been expelled from the Czechoslovak Socialist Party in 1923, as they opposed the Defense of the Republic Act. In the Czechoslovak National Assembly, the Independent Socialists formed a joint parliamentary group (Socialist Association) together with the Independent Radical Social Democratic Party of V. Brodecký. The two groups were set to merge, but Brodecký's group decided to merge with the Czechoslovak Social Democratic Workers Party. The Independent Socialist Party took the name Independent Socialist Workers Party (Czech: Neodvislá socialistická strana dělnická) at a congress in June 1924.

Leading figures of the Independent Socialist Workers Party included Bohuslav Vrbenský, Theodor Bartošek and Luisa Landová-Štychová.

The third congress of the Communist Party of Czechoslovakia, held in September 1925, approved the merger of the Independent Socialist Workers Party into the CPCz. Through the merger between the two parties, a large number of mining workers from Most District joined the CPCz.

The party was a member of the Labour and Socialist International between 1923 and 1933.
