= Independent Radical Social Democratic Party =

The Independent Radical Social Democratic Party (Czech: Neodvislá radikální sociálně demokratická strana) was a political party in Czechoslovakia. The party was founded on May 26, 1921. The party was led by Vilém Brodecký.

The party formed a joint parliamentary group, Socialist Association, together with the Independent Socialist Party. The two parties were set to merge at a congress in June 1924, but Brodecký's party decided to hold its own party congress on September 13–14, 1924. That congress resolved to merge with the Czechoslovak Social Democratic Workers Party. That merger became effective on October 14, 1924.
