= Ladronka =

Activity centre and former squat in Prague, Czech Republic

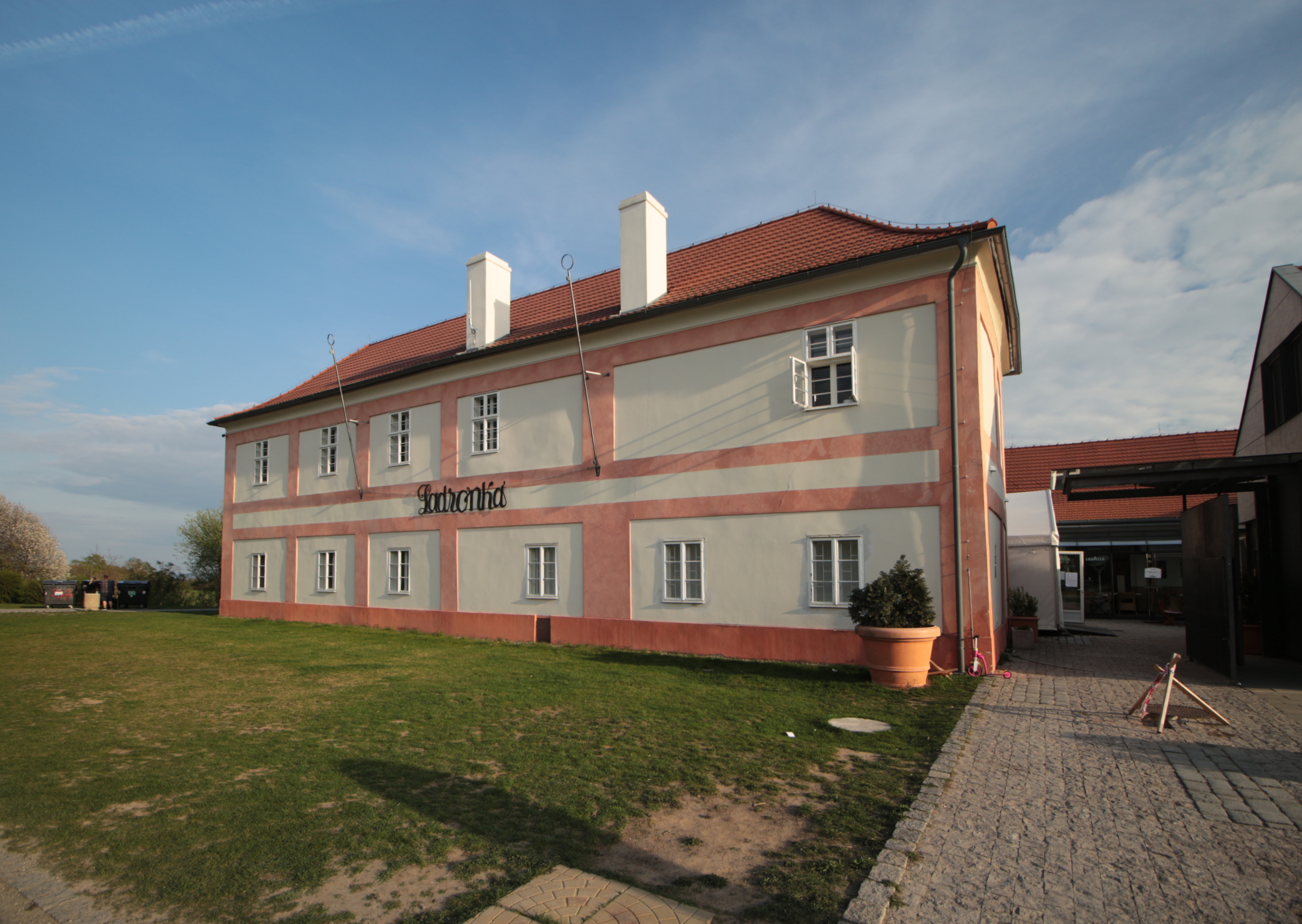
- Ladronka in 2019

General information
- Status: Formerly vineyard, flats and self-managed social centre, now activity centre
- Type: Homestead
- Address: Tomanova 1028/1
- Town or city: Prague
- Country: Czech Republic
- Coordinates: 50.0785°N 14.3563°E
- Renovation cost: 80 million CZK (2005)

Ladronka is a homestead (usedlost) situated in a park in Břevnov, Prague 6, in the Czech Republic. Built by Charles IV in 1340, it was bought by an Italian count, then owned by the Sovereign Military Order of Malta before being broken into flats during the communist period. It was then squatted in 1993, becoming an internationally famous anarchist, self-managed social centre. The squatters organised gigs, exhibitions, readings and theatre, before being evicted in 2000 following the anti-globalization protests in Prague. After several years of renovation, Ladronka was re-opened as an activity centre in 2005, serving the surrounding park.

== History ==
Ladronka is located at Tomanova 1028/1 in the Břevnov district of Prague 6. It was built as a homestead (usedlost) in 1340 by Charles IV, who later became Holy Roman Emperor. It was a vineyard and stopping point on the road to Karlštejn castle. An Italian nobleman, Count Filip Ferdinand de la Crone (or Lacrone), bought the farm in 1688 and it came to be known as Ladronka, deriving from a Czech mispronunciation of his name as "Ladron". Ladronka was subsequently owned by the Catholic religious order the Sovereign Military Order of Malta until World War II. Afterwards it was used as a warehouse and then divided into flats under communism. Following the Velvet Revolution in 1989, it stood derelict and was squatted.

== Self-managed social centre ==
Ladronka was occupied by anarchists in 1993 and became a self-managed social centre. Among the people living there was rapper Vladimír 518. The squatters organised events such as gigs, exhibitions, readings and theatre, also publishing the magazine Autonomie.

The squat was raided by police in February 1994 and the squatters mustered support with demonstrations and petitions. A year later in January 1995, police conducted a second raid in which they searched the entire building and arrested eight squatters. The squatters were not evicted but there were plans to turn the building into a hotel, so the squatters gathered support again. At a public meeting, local people voiced their opposition to the development plans. An eviction date had been set and on the day the squatters symbolically handed over a paper model of the building to the municipality and continued the occupation.

The social centre became internationally famous as a hub for counter-cultural activities and anarchist organisation. The squatters formed the Ladronka Foundation and successfully negotiated with the city of Prague to legalise the occupation. Hundreds of people attended concerts and events at Ladronka. By the late 1990s, the focus of the centre was shifting from politics to cultural activities, as part of a general downturn in anarchist activity in the Czech Republic.

By this time, the city had signed a contract with the Santé group, which planned to develop Ladronka into a luxury medical centre. The social centre was evicted on 9 November 2000 by private security and police as part of a moral panic following the anti-globalization protests in Prague. The eviction was not mandated by any judicial decision. Social centre projects which followed in the tradition of Ladronka have included Squat Milada and Klinika.

== Activity centre ==
After the squatters were evicted, Ladronka was used as a training facility for police dog handlers. Reconstruction plans were delayed by various factors such as the floods across Europe in 2002 and the discovery of archaeological remains on the site. Since the park surrounding the building, now known as Ladronka Park, was used for recreation, a plan was devised to use the Ladronka homestead as an activity centre.

At a cost of 80 million CZK, financed by Prague 6 and the city of Prague, Ladronka was renovated. It now houses facilities for cycling, inline skating and other sports, including equipment hire, as well as a restaurant. Later, beach volleyball and football courts were added. The activity centre was opened in September 2005, marking the 85th anniversary of Prague 6. The following year, the centre was voted Czech Building of the Year. Between 2009 and 2010, the facilities of the park were expanded to include a 4.2 kilometre skating course.
