= Socialista =

Socialista was a daily newspaper in Czechoslovakia, published between 1923 and 1925 in Prague, sometimes confused with El Socialista. Socialista was founded on 1 May 1923. It was the main organ of the Socialist Association.
