= 2000 Prague anti-globalization protests =

Civil unrest during the IMF and World Bank summit in Czech Republic (2000)

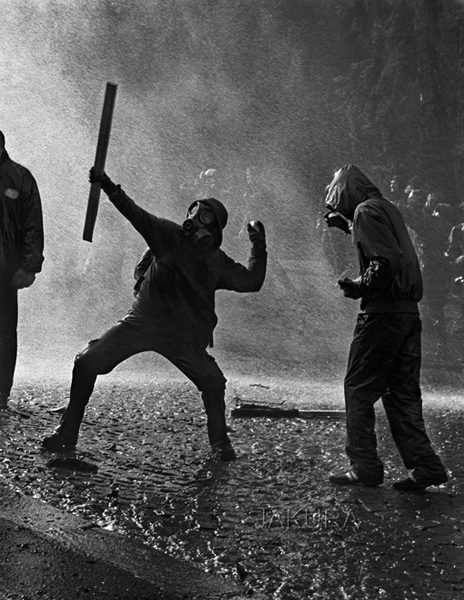
Anarchist protester in Prague in 2000.

Anti-capitalist Protests in Prague took place during the International Monetary Fund (IMF) and World Bank summit on September 27, 2000, in Prague, capital of the Czech Republic.

This protest followed similar protests in Seattle and Washington, DC.

Thousands of activists who travelled from all over the world protested and some clashed with police in the streets of Prague for several days. About 12,000 demonstrators were involved in the protests and over 900 people were detained. 64 policemen and 20 demonstrators were injured in the events.

Various anti-capitalist protesters saw these institutions as one of the reasons for the economic problems faced by the third world. Anger was directed against the way the IMF and World Bank pushed for a policy of directing power to the markets and multinational companies.

Most radical activists tried to prevent the opening of the summit by blocking access roads to the Prague Congress Centre. There were barricades in the streets and camouflaged protestors threw Molotov cocktails and cobblestones. There were also reported attacks on journalists and breaking of shop windows in the city center.

Tear gas and water cannons were used to force back a breakaway group of activists that attempted to reach the summit venue to shut down the meetings of the global financial institutions. In spite of the large police presence, the protesters succeeded in breaking up the last day of the summit.

Additionally this action was marked by the emergence of both the "pink bloc" and the "white overall" tactics used by the Italian radical group Ya Basta!. Many video activist groups from across the EU joined up to share footage and produce a number of documentaries. UK-based Undercurrents produced Revolting in Prague, giving a street view of the various blockade groups.
