= Squat Milada =

Former squatted social centre in Prague, Czech Republic

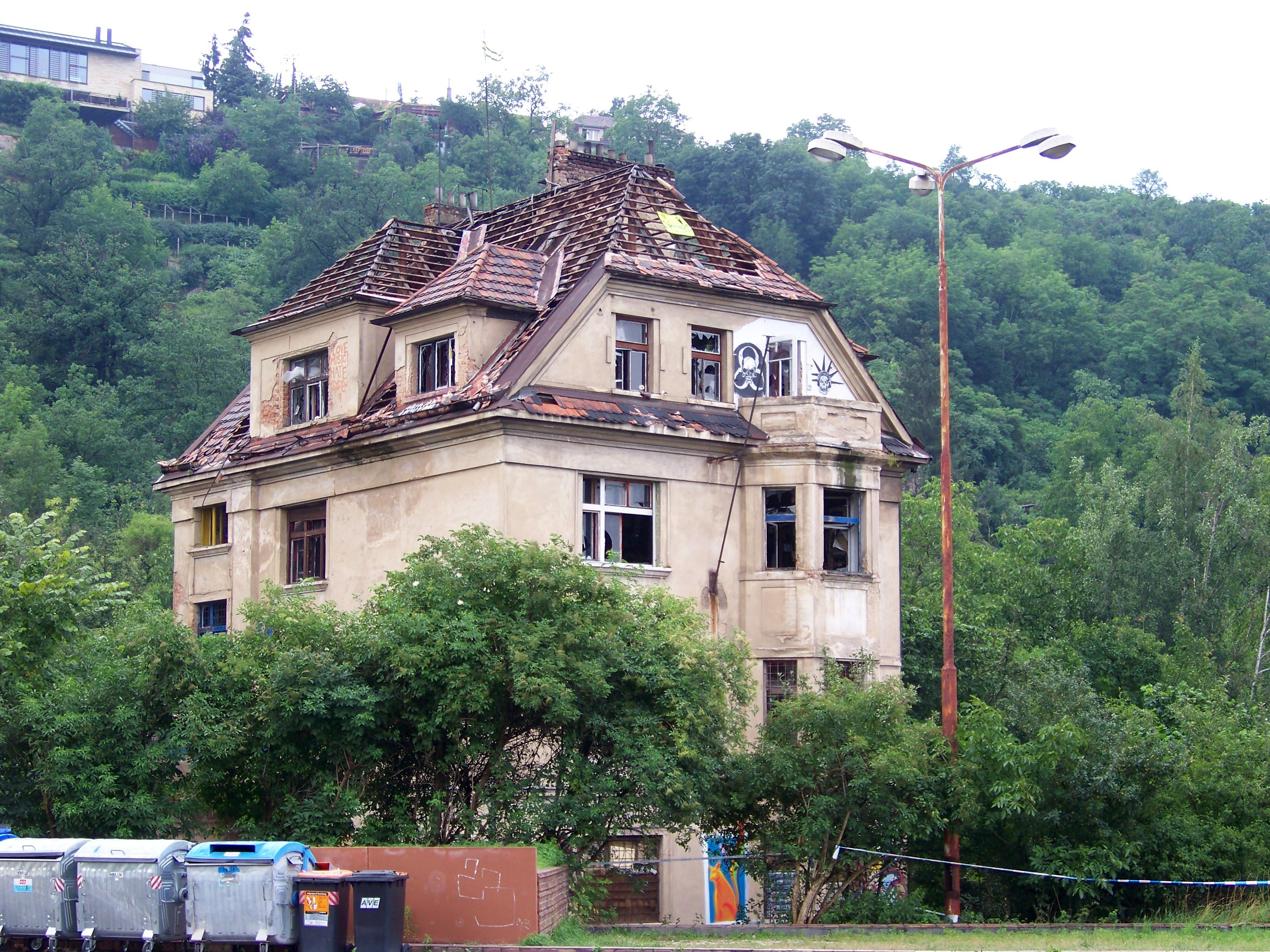
- Interactive map of the Squat Milada area

General information
- Location: Na Kindlovce 1903/8, Libeň, Prague, Czech Republic, 182 00
- Coordinates: 50°07′01″N 14°26′35″E

Squat Milada is a First Republic villa in the Libeň district of Prague. Milada was intended to be demolished in the 1980s and deleted from the cadastre. Therefore, it was a house which officially did not exist. It became one of the Czech Republic's best known squats, occupied from 1997 until 2009, and reoccupied for a day in 2012. Acting as a self-managed social centre and infoshop hosting concerts and events, Milada was also home to a number of people. Despite various plans for the site, as of 2023, the building was standing derelict.

== History ==
Milada is a First Republic villa located in the Libeň district of Prague, next to two blocks of flats (Kolej 17. listopadu) housing university students. As part of plans for its demolition, Milada had been removed from the cadastre and thefore no longer existed officially. Left derelict in 1988, Milada was occupied in 1997, along with the neighbouring villa, Miluška.

== Social centre ==
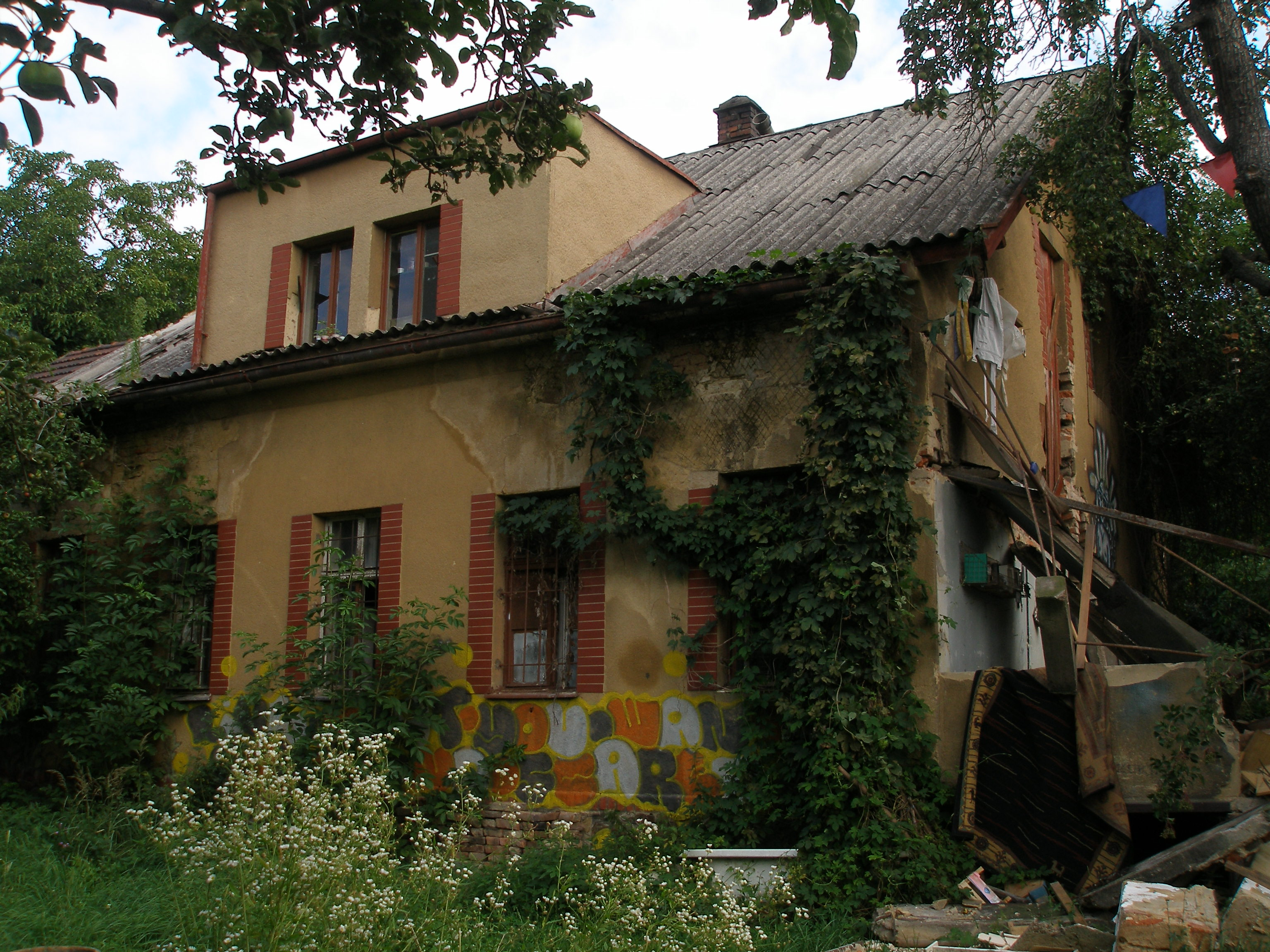
Milada's neighbour Miluška after eviction in 2009

Milada was raided twice by the police in the summer of 1998 and was also attacked by representatives of the owner. In October 1998, a private security firm attempted to evict the building but was repelled, with two squatters remaining on the roof for four days. The security guards trashed the house but were unable to evict it. Students from a nearby housing block strung a line of rope across so that they could supply the occupiers with food and drink.

Originally occupied as a "Point of Free Culture and Resistance", the project then changed into a residential community. Over time, the number of events being organised declined until in 2007, a new collective was formed. The self-managed social centre was used as an infoshop, a bicycle repair workshop, a cafe, a meeting space and a venue for punk gigs and experimental music. A Food Not Bombs collective cooked out of the building, which also housed people. Milada had become one of the longest-lasting and well-known squats in the Czech Republic, alongside Ladronka.

In March 2009, the building was re-registered by the owner, the Institute for Information in Education (ÚIV), as a first step before selling it. ÚIV decided to evict the squat in early July 2009. It sent a private security firm supported by the police to clear the building. The squatters resisted the eviction and eight of them sat on the roof. This resulted in a standoff, with the fire brigade being called to negotiate with the last occupiers. It became a controversial story in the mainstream media and prompted a response from Michael Kocáb, the Minister for Human Rights and Minorities.

== Post-eviction ==
Shortly after the eviction, two squatters re-occupied the building for a short time in order to highlight concerns that it was going to be demolished. Protests against the eviction were held in other Czech cities and in Prague a former spa was occupied in Albertov. The occupation was evicted the next day, with over 70 arrests. The people who had gone inside the building were charged with trespassing and in 2011, the charges were dropped. After the eviction, Kocáb offered the squatters a place to stay at Truhlářská Street in the Old Town. This became known as Truhla, hosting events until June 2010.

A party at Milada to mark three years since the eviction was broken up by the police on 30 June 2012. A helicopter and 100 police arrested 25 people for various offences. In 2015, there was a debate in the media as the Supreme Administrative Court considered an appeal regarding the legality of the eviction of Milada. Two complaints by activists concerning their treatment during the eviction went to the European Court of Justice and were dismissed in 2022.

Charles University had planned to set up a small campus at Milada, but failed to transfer the ownership of the building from the Institute for Information in Education in 2010. After the eviction, the university tried again, without success. In 2019, the building was still standing derelict; it was owned by the Office of Government Representation in Property Affairs (ÚZSVM) and there were no plans to restore the villa. In 2021, the university was able to buy the Milada site for CZK 56,753,000. It made plans to redevelop it into a campus. As of 2023, the building remained derelict.
