= Bohuslav Vrbenský =

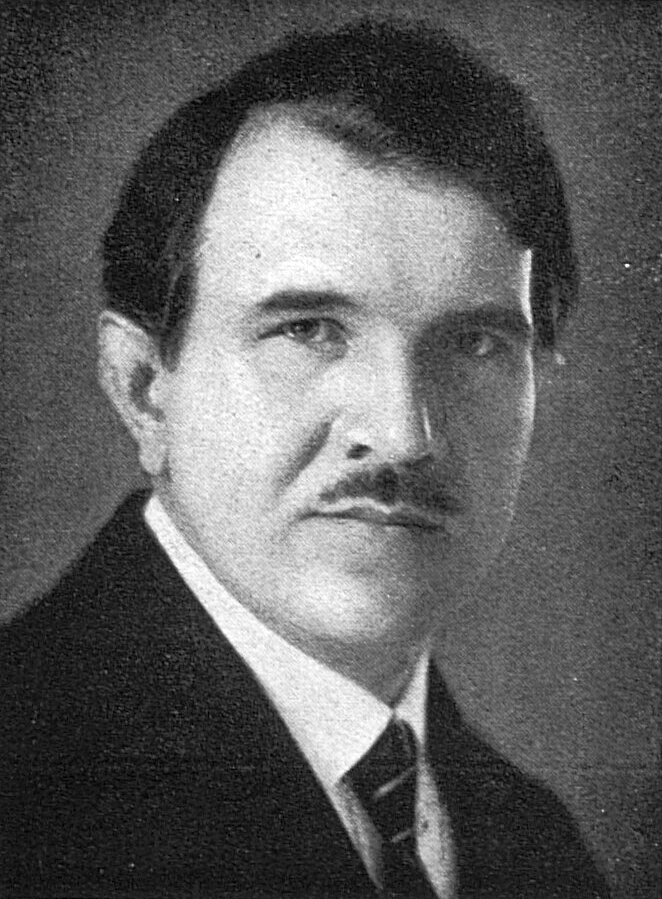

Minister of Health
- In office 26 September 1921 – 7 October 1922
- Preceded by: Ladislav Prokop Procházka
- Succeeded by: Jan Šrámek

Minister of Food
- In office 14 November 1918 – 8 July 1919
- Preceded by: Position established
- Succeeded by: Fedor Houdek

Minister of Public Works
- In office 25 May 1920 – 15 September 1920
- Preceded by: Antonín Hampl
- Succeeded by: František Kovářík

Personal details
- Born: 29 March 1882 Opočnice, Bohemia, Austria-Hungary
- Died: 25 November 1944 (aged 62) Moscow, Russian SFSR, Soviet Union
- Party: ČSNS; NSS; KSČ
- Education: Charles University
- Occupation: Politician, dentist, journalist, writer

Bohuslav Vrbenský (29 March 1882 – 25 November 1944) was a Czech politician, physician and publicist. A leading anarchist for most of his career, he later became a prominent member of the Communist Party of Czechoslovakia.

== Biography ==
Vrbenský was born in the village of Opočnice in Bohemia, Austria-Hungary. He studied at the Czech Medical Faculty in Prague, graduating in 1909. From 1904 to 1906 he served as chairman of the Czech Students' Union. Before World War I he was one of the leaders of the Czech anarcho-communist movement and was one of the founders of the Federation of Czech Anarchists. From 1914 to 1917 he was interned by the Austrian authorities.

In April 1918, he managed to convert the majority of Czech anarchists to the Czechoslovak Socialist Party. He served in the Revolutionary National Assembly from 1918 to 1920. In the parliamentary elections of 1920, he won a seat in the National Assembly for the Socialists and served as chairman of their parliamentary group.

He also held numerous government positions. In 1918–1919, he served as Minister of Food in the government of Karel Kramář, in 1920 he was Minister of Public Works in the second government of Vlastimil Tusar, and in 1921–1922 he held the post of Minister of Public Health and Physical Education in the government of Edvard Beneš.

In 1923, together with other former anarchists, he voted in the National Assembly with communist deputies against the Law on the Protection of the Republic. For this decision, he was expelled from the party together with the others on March 3 of the same year. 1923. From 1923 to 1925, he became the chairman of the newly formed Independent Socialist Workers Party, which was founded by former anarchists. In 1925, its members joined the Communist Party of Czechoslovakia.

From 1934 to 1939 he held the position of chairman of the Union of Friends of the USSR and in 1938–1939 he was deputy mayor of Prague. At the beginning of the Nazi occupation he was imprisoned for a short time and after his release he emigrated to the Soviet Union, where began closely collaborating the Gottwald group. From January 1942 Vrbenský worked as a member of the Czechoslovak State Council in exile in London and a delegate of the Czechoslovak Red Cross in the Soviet Union. He participated in the building of Czechoslovak units in the Soviet Union.

He died of a heart attack in Moscow. His ashes were later buried at the National Monument at Vítkov and then relocated to the be buried in a community grave at Olšany Cemetery.
