= List of oldest people =

The following are lists of oldest people in the world in ordinal ranks. To avoid including false or unconfirmed claims of old age, names here are restricted to those people whose ages have been validated by an international body dealing in longevity research, such as the Gerontology Research Group, LongeviQuest, or Guinness World Records, and others who have otherwise been reliably sourced.

The longest documented and verified human lifespan is that of Jeanne Calment of France (1875–1997), a woman who lived to the age of 122 years and 164 days. As women live longer than men on average, women predominate in combined records. The longest lifespan for a man is that of Jiroemon Kimura of Japan (1897–2013), who lived to the age of 116 years and 54 days.

The oldest living person in the world whose age has been validated is Ethel Caterham of the United Kingdom, who has lived 117 years, 88 days. She was born on 21 August 1909. The oldest living verified man is João Marinho Neto of Brazil, who has lived 114 years, 43 days. He was born on 5 October 1912.

== Ten oldest verified people ==
Systematic verification of longevity has only been practiced since the 1950s and only in certain parts of the world. All ten oldest verified people ever are female.

The longest documented and verified human lifespan is that of Jeanne Calment of France, a woman who lived to the age of 122 years and 164 days. She received news media attention in 1985, after turning 110. Calment's claim was investigated and authenticated by Jean-Marie Robine and Dr. Michel Allard for the Gerontology Research Group (GRG). Her longevity claim was put into question in 2018, but the original assessing team stood by their judgement.

=== Oldest women ===
Rank	Name	Birth date	Death date	Age at death or currently	Country of death or residence
1	Jeanne Calment	21 February 1875	4 August 1997	122 years, 164 days	France
2	Kane Tanaka	2 January 1903	19 April 2022	119 years, 107 days	Japan
3	Sarah Knauss	24 September 1880	30 December 1999	119 years, 97 days	United States
4	Lucile Randon	11 February 1904	17 January 2023	118 years, 340 days	France
5	Nabi Tajima	4 August 1900	21 April 2018	117 years, 260 days	Japan
6	Marie-Louise Meilleur	29 August 1880	16 April 1998	117 years, 230 days	Canada
7	Violet Brown	10 March 1900	15 September 2017	117 years, 189 days	Jamaica
8	Maria Branyas Morera	4 March 1907	19 August 2024	117 years, 168 days	Spain^{[a]}
9	Emma Morano	29 November 1899	15 April 2017	117 years, 137 days	Italy
10	Ethel Caterham	21 August 1909	Living	117 years, 88 days	United Kingdom

=== Oldest men ===
Rank	Name	Birth date	Death date	Age at death or currently	Country of death or residence
1	Jiroemon Kimura	19 April 1897	12 June 2013	116 years, 54 days	Japan
2	Christian Mortensen	16 August 1882	25 April 1998	115 years, 252 days	United States^{[b]}
3	Emiliano Mercado del Toro	21 August 1891	24 January 2007	115 years, 156 days	Puerto Rico
4	Juan Vicente Pérez	27 May 1909	2 April 2024	114 years, 311 days	Venezuela
5	Horacio Celi Mendoza	3 January 1897	25 September 2011	114 years, 265 days	Peru
6	Walter Breuning	21 September 1896	14 April 2011	114 years, 205 days	United States
7	Yukichi Chuganji	23 March 1889	28 September 2003	114 years, 189 days	Japan
8	Tomás Pinales Figuereo	31 March 1906	24 September 2020	114 years, 177 days	Dominican Republic
9	Joan Riudavets	15 December 1889	5 March 2004	114 years, 81 days	Spain
10	João Marinho Neto	5 October 1912	Living	114 years, 43 days	Brazil

aBranyas was born in the United States.
bMortensen was born in Denmark.

== Ten oldest living people ==
=== Oldest living people ===
Rank	Name	Sex	Birth date	Age as of 17 November 2026	Country of residence
1	Ethel Caterham	F	21 August 1909	117 years, 88 days	United Kingdom
2	Naomi Whitehead	F	26 September 1910	116 years, 52 days	United States
3	Lucia Laura Sangenito	F	22 November 1910	115 years, 360 days	Italy
4	Yolanda Beltrão de Azevedo	F	13 January 1911	115 years, 308 days	Brazil
5	Beatriz Ferreira Duarte	F	21 June 1911	115 years, 149 days	Brazil
6	Fuyo Kishimoto	F	20 December 1911	114 years, 332 days	Japan
7	Madeleine Dellamonica	F	23 July 1912	114 years, 117 days	France
8	Anonymous of Hyōgo	F	18 September 1912	114 years, 60 days	Japan
9	João Marinho Neto	M	5 October 1912	114 years, 43 days	Brazil
10	Catherine Ferrell	F	10 October 1912	114 years, 38 days	United States

=== Oldest living men ===
Rank	Name	Birth date	Age as of 17 November 2026	Country of residence
1	João Marinho Neto	5 October 1912	114 years, 43 days	Brazil
2	Ken Weeks	5 October 1913	113 years, 43 days	Australia
3	Hikaru Katō	2 May 1914	112 years, 199 days	Japan
4	Tokuji Tanigaki	8 November 1914	112 years, 9 days	Japan
5	Pedro María Molina Márquez	27 April 1915	111 years, 204 days	Venezuela
6	Joaquim Varela	1 June 1915	111 years, 169 days	Portugal
7	Jesús Redondo Bermejo	2 June 1915	111 years, 168 days	Spain
8	Juan Mijares Camargo	28 June 1915	111 years, 142 days	Venezuela
9	Juan Bautista Quiróz Pití	29 August 1915	111 years, 80 days	Panama
10	Hugh Kerr	9 October 1915	111 years, 39 days	United Kingdom

== Chronological list of the oldest known living people since 1951 ==
This table lists the sequence of the world's oldest known living people from 1951 to present, according to GRG research and the Guinness World Records. Due to the life expectancy difference between sexes, nearly all the oldest living people have been women (thus the maximum life span is guided by the female numbers); a sequence of the oldest living men is provided below the main list.

From	Duration	Name	Sex	Age(s) when oldest	Lifespan	Country of death or residence
Unknown	—N/a	Lucy Woodman	F	N/A–109	3 May 1841 – 28 April 1951; 109 years, 360 days	United States
28 April 1951	2 years, 261 days	Nancy Merriman	F	109–112	19 December 1841 – 14 January 1954; 112 years, 26 days	United States
14 January 1954	1 year, 283 days	Betsy Baker	F	111–113	20 August 1842 – 24 October 1955; 113 years, 65 days	United States (Note: Baker was born in the United Kingdom.)
24 October 1955	1 year, 53 days	Jennie Howell	F	110–111	11 February 1845 – 16 December 1956; 111 years, 309 days	United States
16 December 1956	22 days	Mathias Hansen Saether	M	108	21 October 1848 – 7 January 1957; 108 years, 78 days	Norway
7 January 1957	1 year, 362 days	Catherine Waller	F	108–110	1 December 1848 – 4 January 1959; 110 years, 34 days	United States
4 January 1959	276 days	Christina Karnebeek-Backs	F	109–110	2 October 1849 – 7 October 1959; 110 years, 5 days	Netherlands
7 October 1959	1 year, 2 days	Robert Early	M	109–111	8 October 1849 – 9 October 1960; 111 years, 1 day	United States
9 October 1960	50 days	Nettie Minick	F	109	3 April 1851 – 28 November 1960; 109 years, 239 days	United States
28 November 1960	4 years, 32 days	Mary Kelly	F	109–113	7 June 1851 – 30 December 1964; 113 years, 206 days	United States
30 December 1964	2 years, 157 days	James King	M	110–112	15 November 1854 – 5 June 1967; 112 years, 202 days	United States
5 June 1967	1 year, 138 days	Narcissa Rickman	F	111–113	13 September 1855 – 21 October 1968; 113 years, 38 days	United States
21 October 1968	195 days	Marie Bernátková	F	110–111	22 October 1857 – 4 May 1969; 111 years, 194 days	Czechoslovakia (Note: Bernátková was born and died in a part of it which is now the Czech Republic.)
4 May 1969	252 days	Ada Roe	F	111	6 February 1858 – 11 January 1970; 111 years, 339 days	United Kingdom
11 January 1970	2 years, 181 days	Kitty Harvey	F	109–112	12 January 1860 – 10 July 1972; 112 years, 180 days	United States
10 July 1972	232 days	Josefa Salas Mateo	F	111–112	14 July 1860 – 27 February 1973; 112 years, 228 days	Spain
27 February 1973	172 days	Alice Stevenson	F	111–112	10 July 1861 – 18 August 1973; 112 years, 39 days	United Kingdom
18 August 1973	145 days	Ettie Crist	F	111	14 February 1862 – 10 January 1974; 111 years, 330 days	United States
10 January 1974	87 days	Laurence Entiope	F	111	9 December 1862 – 7 April 1974; 111 years, 119 days	France
7 April 1974	1 year, 54 days	Mito Umeta	F	110–112	14 May 1863 – 31 May 1975; 112 years, 17 days	Japan
31 May 1975	1 year, 169 days	Niwa Kawamoto	F	111–113	17 September 1863 – 16 November 1976; 113 years, 60 days	Japan
16 November 1976	1 year, 354 days	Alice Coles	F	111–113	28 August 1865 – 5 November 1978; 113 years, 69 days	United States
5 November 1978	2 years, 83 days	Eliza Underwood	F	112–114	15 March 1866 – 27 January 1981; 114 years, 318 days	United States
27 January 1981	40 days	Augustine Tessier	F	112	2 January 1869 – 8 March 1981; 112 years, 65 days	France
8 March 1981	1 year, 250 days	Nellie Spencer	F	111–113	24 August 1869 – 13 November 1982; 113 years, 81 days	United States
13 November 1982	334 days	Emma Wilson	F	112–113	12 May 1870 – 13 October 1983; 113 years, 154 days	United States
13 October 1983	3 years, 8 days	Augusta Holtz	F	112–115	3 August 1871 – 21 October 1986; 115 years, 79 days	United States (Note: Holtz was born in Czarnikau in the German Empire; her birthplace is now in Poland.)
21 October 1986	104 days	Mary McKinney	F	113	30 May 1873 – 2 February 1987; 113 years, 248 days	United States
2 February 1987	328 days	Anna Eliza Williams	F	113–114	2 June 1873 – 27 December 1987; 114 years, 208 days	United Kingdom
27 December 1987	15 days	Florence Knapp	F	114	10 October 1873 – 11 January 1988; 114 years, 93 days	United States
11 January 1988	2 years, 177 days	Easter Wiggins	F	113–116	1 June 1874 – 7 July 1990; 116 years, 36 days	United States
7 July 1990	7 years, 28 days	Jeanne Calment (Note: Calment's case was disputed in a study posted online in November 2018. Current analysis supports the hypothesis that Calment's listed age is legitimate.)	F	115–122	21 February 1875 – 4 August 1997; 122 years, 164 days	France
4 August 1997	255 days	Marie-Louise Meilleur	F	116–117	29 August 1880 – 16 April 1998; 117 years, 230 days	Canada
16 April 1998	1 year, 258 days	Sarah Knauss	F	117–119	24 September 1880 – 30 December 1999; 119 years, 97 days	United States
30 December 1999	327 days	Ella Miller	F	115	6 December 1884 – 21 November 2000; 115 years, 351 days	United States
21 November 2000	197 days	Marie Brémont	F	114–115	25 April 1886 – 6 June 2001; 115 years, 42 days	France
5 June 2001 (Note: Marie Brémont died 6 June 2001 2:15 a.m. CEST. However, in Georgia, where Gantt lived, the date was still 5 June 2001 (EDT).)	145 days	Ella Gantt	F	114	30 November 1886 – 28 October 2001; 114 years, 332 days	United States
28 October 2001	141 days	Maud Farris-Luse	F	114–115	21 February 1887 – 18 March 2002; 115 years, 25 days	United States
18 March 2002	71 days	Grace Clawson	F	114	15 November 1887 – 28 May 2002; 114 years, 194 days	United States (Note: Clawson was born in the United Kingdom.)
28 May 2002	85 days	Adelina Domingues	F	114	19 February 1888 – 21 August 2002; 114 years, 183 days	United States (Note: Domingues was born in Cape Verde.)
21 August 2002	130 days	Mae Harrington	F	113	20 January 1889 – 29 December 2002; 113 years, 343 days	United States
29 December 2002	273 days	Yukichi Chuganji	M	113–114	23 March 1889 – 28 September 2003; 114 years, 189 days	Japan
28 September 2003	46 days	Mitoyo Kawate	F	114	15 May 1889 – 13 November 2003; 114 years, 182 days	Japan
13 November 2003	198 days	Ramona Trinidad Iglesias Jordan	F	114	1 September 1889 – 29 May 2004; 114 years, 271 days	United States (Puerto Rico)
29 May 2004	2 years, 90 days	María Capovilla	F	114–116	14 September 1889 – 27 August 2006; 116 years, 347 days	Ecuador
27 August 2006	106 days	Elizabeth Bolden	F	116	15 August 1890 – 11 December 2006; 116 years, 118 days	United States
11 December 2006	44 days	Emiliano Mercado del Toro	M	115	21 August 1891 – 24 January 2007; 115 years, 156 days	United States (Puerto Rico)
24 January 2007	4 days	Emma Tillman	F	114	22 November 1892 – 28 January 2007; 114 years, 67 days	United States
29 January 2007 (Note: Emma Tillman died 28 January 2007 (EST). However, in Fukuoka Prefecture, where Minagawa lived, the date was already 29 January 2007 (JST).)	196 days	Yone Minagawa	F	114	4 January 1893 – 13 August 2007; 114 years, 221 days	Japan
13 August 2007	1 year, 105 days	Edna Parker	F	114–115	20 April 1893 – 26 November 2008; 115 years, 220 days	United States
26 November 2008	37 days	Maria de Jesus	F	115	10 September 1893 – 2 January 2009; 115 years, 114 days	Portugal
2 January 2009	252 days	Gertrude Baines	F	114–115	6 April 1894 – 11 September 2009; 115 years, 158 days	United States
11 September 2009	233 days	Kama Chinen	F	114	10 May 1895 – 2 May 2010; 114 years, 357 days	Japan
2 May 2010	186 days	Eugénie Blanchard	F	114	16 February 1896 – 4 November 2010; 114 years, 261 days	France (Saint Barthélemy)
4 November 2010	14 days	Ana Nogueira de Luca	F	114	21 June 1896 – 18 November 2010; 114 years, 150 days	Brazil
18 November 2010	215 days	Maria Gomes Valentim	F	114	9 July 1896 – 21 June 2011; 114 years, 347 days	Brazil
21 June 2011	1 year, 166 days	Besse Cooper	F	114–116	26 August 1896 – 4 December 2012; 116 years, 100 days	United States
4 December 2012	13 days	Dina Manfredini	F	115	4 April 1897 – 17 December 2012; 115 years, 257 days	United States (Note: Manfredini was born in Italy.)
17 December 2012	177 days	Jiroemon Kimura	M	115–116	19 April 1897 – 12 June 2013; 116 years, 54 days	Japan
12 June 2013	1 year, 293 days	Misao Okawa	F	115–117	5 March 1898 – 1 April 2015; 117 years, 27 days	Japan
31 March 2015 (Note: Misao Okawa died 1 April 2015 (JST). However, in Arkansas, where Weaver lived, the date was still 31 March 2015 (Central Time Zone).)	6 days	Gertrude Weaver	F	116	4 July 1898 – 6 April 2015; 116 years, 276 days	United States
6 April 2015	72 days	Jeralean Talley	F	115–116	23 May 1899 – 17 June 2015; 116 years, 25 days	United States
17 June 2015	330 days	Susannah Mushatt Jones	F	115–116	6 July 1899 – 12 May 2016; 116 years, 311 days	United States
13 May 2016 (Note: Susannah Mushatt Jones died 12 May 2016 8:26 p.m. EDT. However, in Italy, where Morano lived, the date was already 13 May 2016 (CEST).)	337 days	Emma Morano	F	116–117	29 November 1899 – 15 April 2017; 117 years, 137 days	Italy
15 April 2017	153 days	Violet Brown	F	117	10 March 1900 – 15 September 2017; 117 years, 189 days	Jamaica
16 September 2017 (Note: Violet Brown died on 15 September 2017 in Jamaica (UTC-5). However, in Japan, where Tajima lived, the date was already 16 September 2017 (JST).)	217 days	Nabi Tajima	F	117	4 August 1900 – 21 April 2018; 117 years, 260 days	Japan
21 April 2018	92 days	Chiyo Miyako	F	116–117	2 May 1901 – 22 July 2018; 117 years, 81 days	Japan
22 July 2018	3 years, 271 days	Kane Tanaka	F	115–119	2 January 1903 – 19 April 2022; 119 years, 107 days	Japan
19 April 2022	273 days	Lucile Randon	F	118	11 February 1904 – 17 January 2023; 118 years, 340 days	France
17 January 2023	1 year, 215 days	Maria Branyas Morera	F	115–117	4 March 1907 – 19 August 2024; 117 years, 168 days	Spain (Note: Branyas was born in the United States.)
19 August 2024	132 days	Tomiko Itooka	F	116	23 May 1908 – 29 December 2024; 116 years, 220 days	Japan
29 December 2024	122 days	Inah Canabarro Lucas	F	116	8 June 1908 – 30 April 2025; 116 years, 326 days	Brazil
30 April 2025	1 year, 201 days	Ethel Caterham	F	115–117*	born 21 August 1909; 117 years, 88 days	United Kingdom

== Chronological list of the oldest living men since 1951 ==
This table lists the sequence of the world's oldest known living man from 1951 to present. Bold indicates people who were also the oldest living person.

From	Duration	Name	Age(s) when oldest	Lifespan	Country of death or residence
Unknown	—N/a	James Smith	N/A–108	10 July 1842 – 27 March 1951; 108 years, 260 days	United States
27 March 1951	1 year, 350 days	James Hard	107–109	15 July 1843 – 12 March 1953; 109 years, 240 days	United States
12 March 1953	212 days	Karl Glöckner	107	29 December 1845 – 10 October 1953; 107 years, 285 days	West Germany
10 October 1953	342 days	Wayland Newell	107–108	15 September 1846 – 17 September 1954; 108 years, 2 days	United States
17 September 1954	6 days	Anders Johansson	106	24 March 1848 – 23 September 1954; 106 years, 183 days	Sweden
23 September 1954	71 days	Euclid Story	106	30 July 1848 – 3 December 1954; 106 years, 126 days	United States
3 December 1954	101 days	Daniel Cummings	106	25 September 1848 – 14 March 1955; 106 years, 170 days	United States
**14 March 1955**	**1 year, 299 days**	**Mathias Hansen Saether**	**106–108**	**21 October 1848 – 7 January 1957**; **108 years, 78 days**	**Norway**
**7 January 1957**	**3 years, 276 days**	**Robert Early**	**107–111**	**8 October 1849 – 9 October 1960**; **111 years, 1 day**	**United States**
9 October 1960	61 days	Willem Kostering	108–109	22 November 1851 – 9 December 1960; 109 years, 17 days	Netherlands
9 December 1960	1 year, 93 days	Sylvester Melvin	109–110	29 November 1851 – 12 March 1962; 110 years, 103 days	United States
12 March 1962	4 days	Joseph Saint-Amour	110	26 February 1852 – 16 March 1962; 110 years, 18 days	Canada
16 March 1962	251 days	William Smith	108	28 February 1854 – 22 November 1962; 108 years, 267 days	United States
**22 November 1962**	**4 years, 195 days**	**James King**	**108–112**	**15 November 1854 – 5 June 1967**; **112 years, 202 days**	**United States**
5 June 1967	290 days	John Mosley Turner	110–111	15 June 1856 – 21 March 1968; 111 years, 280 days	United Kingdom
21 March 1968	248 days	Eli Lindsay	110	28 February 1858 – 24 November 1968; 110 years, 270 days	Canada (Note: Lindsay was born in the United Kingdom.)
24 November 1968	32 days	John Chaney	109	12 October 1859 – 26 December 1968; 109 years, 75 days	United States
26 December 1968	117 days	William Lamb	109	24 November 1859 – 22 April 1969; 109 years, 149 days	United States
22 April 1969	257 days	John Johnson	108–109	27 May 1860 – 4 January 1970; 109 years, 222 days	United States (Note: Johnson was born in Norway.)
4 January 1970	1 year, 332 days	Theophilus May	108–110	5 January 1861 – 2 December 1971; 110 years, 331 days	United States (Note: May was born in the United Kingdom.)
2 December 1971	1 year, 154 days	Friedrich Wedeking	109–110	10 October 1862 – 5 May 1973; 110 years, 207 days	West Germany
5 May 1973	1 year, 166 days	Isaac Edwards	109–110	6 December 1863 – 18 October 1974; 110 years, 316 days	United States
18 October 1974	2 years, 81 days	James Holt	108–111	25 December 1865 – 7 January 1977; 111 years, 13 days	United States
7 January 1977	69 days	Jean Teillet	110	6 November 1866 – 17 March 1977; 110 years, 131 days	France
17 March 1977	1 year, 156 days	Charlie Nelson	109–110	21 September 1867 – 20 August 1978; 110 years, 333 days	United States
20 August 1978	2 years, 16 days	Charlie Phillips	109–111	5 May 1869 – 5 September 1980; 111 years, 123 days	United States
5 September 1980	1 year, 225 days	Zachariah Blackistone	109–111	16 February 1871 – 18 April 1982; 111 years, 61 days	United States
18 April 1982	320 days	James Nash	109–110	31 July 1872 – 4 March 1983; 110 years, 216 days	United States
4 March 1983	160 days	Walter Wilcox	110	1 November 1872 – 11 August 1983; 110 years, 283 days	United States
11 August 1983	133 days	Gregory Pandazes	110	15 January 1873 – 22 December 1983; 110 years, 341 days	United States (Note: Pandazes was born in Mytilene in the Ottoman Empire; it is now part of Greece.)
22 December 1983	186 days	Benjamin Garner	110	10 August 1873 – 25 June 1984; 110 years, 320 days	United States
25 June 1984	173 days	Randolph Davis	110–111	15 October 1873 – 15 December 1984; 111 years, 61 days	United States
15 December 1984	1 year, 364 days	Joe Thomas	109–111	1 May 1875 – 14 December 1986; 111 years, 227 days	United States
14 December 1986	22 days	Herman Smith-Johannsen	111	15 June 1875 – 5 January 1987; 111 years, 204 days	Norway
5 January 1987	1 year, 325 days	Alphaeus Philemon Cole	110–112	12 July 1876 – 25 November 1988; 112 years, 136 days	United States
25 November 1988	1 year, 197 days	John Evans	111–112	19 August 1877 – 10 June 1990; 112 years, 295 days	United Kingdom
10 June 1990	8 days	Henri Pérignon	110	14 October 1879 – 18 June 1990; 110 years, 247 days	France
18 June 1990	189 days	Robert Freeman	110–111	22 December 1879 – 24 December 1990; 111 years, 2 days	United States
24 December 1990	2 years, 172 days	Frederick Frazier	110–113	27 January 1880 – 14 June 1993; 113 years, 138 days	United States
14 June 1993	220 days	Josep Armengol Jover	111–112	23 July 1881 – 20 January 1994; 112 years, 181 days	Spain
20 January 1994	210 days	Park Fountain Heard	111–112	18 May 1882 – 18 August 1994; 112 years, 92 days	United States
18 August 1994	3 years, 250 days	Christian Mortensen	112–115	16 August 1882 – 25 April 1998; 115 years, 252 days	United States (Note: Mortensen was born in Denmark.)
25 April 1998	246 days	Donald Butler	112–113	21 August 1885 – 27 December 1998; 113 years, 128 days	United States
27 December 1998	123 days	Denzō Ishizaki	112	2 October 1886 – 29 April 1999; 112 years, 209 days	Japan
29 April 1999	200 days	Antonio Urrea Hernandez	111	18 February 1888 – 15 November 1999; 111 years, 270 days	Spain
15 November 1999	1 year, 106 days	John Painter	111–112	20 September 1888 – 1 March 2001; 112 years, 162 days	United States
1 March 2001	308 days	Antonio Todde	112	22 January 1889 – 3 January 2002; 112 years, 346 days	Italy
**3 January 2002**	**1 year, 268 days**	**Yukichi Chuganji**	**112–114**	**23 March 1889 – 28 September 2003**; **114 years, 189 days**	**Japan**
28 September 2003	159 days	Joan Riudavets	113–114	15 December 1889 – 5 March 2004; 114 years, 81 days	Spain
5 March 2004	259 days	Fred Harold Hale	113	1 December 1890 – 19 November 2004; 113 years, 354 days	United States
**19 November 2004**	**2 years, 66 days**	**Emiliano Mercado del Toro**	**113–115**	**21 August 1891 – 24 January 2007**; **115 years, 156 days**	**United States** **(Puerto Rico)**
24 January 2007	2 years, 146 days	Tomoji Tanabe	111–113	18 September 1895 – 19 June 2009; 113 years, 274 days	Japan
19 June 2009	29 days	Henry Allingham	113	6 June 1896 – 18 July 2009; 113 years, 42 days	United Kingdom
18 July 2009	1 year, 270 days	Walter Breuning	112–114	21 September 1896 – 14 April 2011; 114 years, 205 days	United States
14 April 2011	164 days	Horacio Celi Mendoza	114	3 January 1897 – 25 September 2011; 114 years, 265 days	Peru
**25 September 2011**	**1 year, 260 days**	**Jiroemon Kimura**	**114–116**	**19 April 1897 – 12 June 2013**; **116 years, 54 days**	**Japan**
11 June 2013 (Note: Jiroemon Kimura died 12 June 2013 (JST). However, in New York, where Sanchez lived, the date was still 11 June 2013 (EDT).)	94 days	Salustiano Sanchez	112	8 June 1901 – 13 September 2013; 112 years, 97 days	United States (Note: Sanchez was born in Spain.)
13 September 2013	194 days	Ernest Peronneau	111–112	7 March 1902 – 26 March 2014; 112 years, 19 days	United States
26 March 2014	29 days	Arturo Licata	111	2 May 1902 – 24 April 2014; 111 years, 357 days	Italy
24 April 2014	45 days	Alexander Imich	111	4 February 1903 – 8 June 2014; 111 years, 124 days	United States (Note: Imich was born in Częstochowa, then part of the Russian Empire, now in Poland.)
8 June 2014	1 year, 27 days	Sakari Momoi	111–112	5 February 1903 – 5 July 2015; 112 years, 150 days	Japan
5 July 2015	198 days	Yasutaro Koide	112	13 March 1903 – 19 January 2016; 112 years, 312 days	Japan
18 January 2016 (Note: Yasutaro Koide died 19 January 2016 12:17 a.m. JST. However, in Israel, where Kristal lived, the date was still 18 January 2016 (IST).)	1 year, 205 days	Israel Kristal	112–113	15 September 1903 – 11 August 2017; 113 years, 330 days	Israel (Note: Kristal was born in Maleniec, Końskie County, then part of the Russian Empire, now in Poland.)
11 August 2017	171 days	Francisco Núñez Olivera	112–113	13 December 1904 – 29 January 2018; 113 years, 47 days	Spain
30 January 2018 (Note: Francisco Núñez Olivera died 29 January 2018 around 10:30 p.m. CET. However, in Japan, where Nonaka lived, the date was already 30 January 2018 (JST).)	355 days	Masazo Nonaka	112–113	25 July 1905 – 20 January 2019; 113 years, 179 days	Japan
20 January 2019	1 year, 248 days	Tomás Pinales Figuereo	112–114	31 March 1906 – 24 September 2020; 114 years, 177 days	Dominican Republic
24 September 2020 (Note: Between 28 May 2020 and 27 June 2020, Guinness World Records recognized Dumitru Comănescu from Romania as the world's oldest living man. However, it was later found that Emilio Flores Márquez was born three months earlier than Comănescu. Furthermore, Tomás Pinales Figuereo would later be validated by the GRG, meaning that Márquez did not officially become the world's oldest living man until Pinales's death on 24 September 2020.)	322 days	Emilio Flores Márquez	112–113	8 August 1908 – 12 August 2021; 113 years, 4 days	United States (Puerto Rico)
12 August 2021	159 days	Saturnino de la Fuente García	112	11 February 1909 – 18 January 2022; 112 years, 341 days	Spain
18 January 2022	2 years, 75 days	Juan Vicente Pérez	112–114	27 May 1909 – 2 April 2024; 114 years, 311 days	Venezuela
2 April 2024	88 days	Shi Ping	112	1 November 1911 – 29 June 2024; 112 years, 241 days	China
29 June 2024	149 days	John Tinniswood	111–112	26 August 1912 – 25 November 2024; 112 years, 91 days	United Kingdom
25 November 2024	1 year, 357 days	João Marinho Neto	112–114*	born 5 October 1912; 114 years, 43 days	Brazil
