= Mushatt =

Mushatt is a surname. Notable people with the surname include:

- Rannie Mushatt in 1958 NFL draft
- Susannah Mushatt (1899–2016), American supercentenarian
