= List of the verified oldest people =

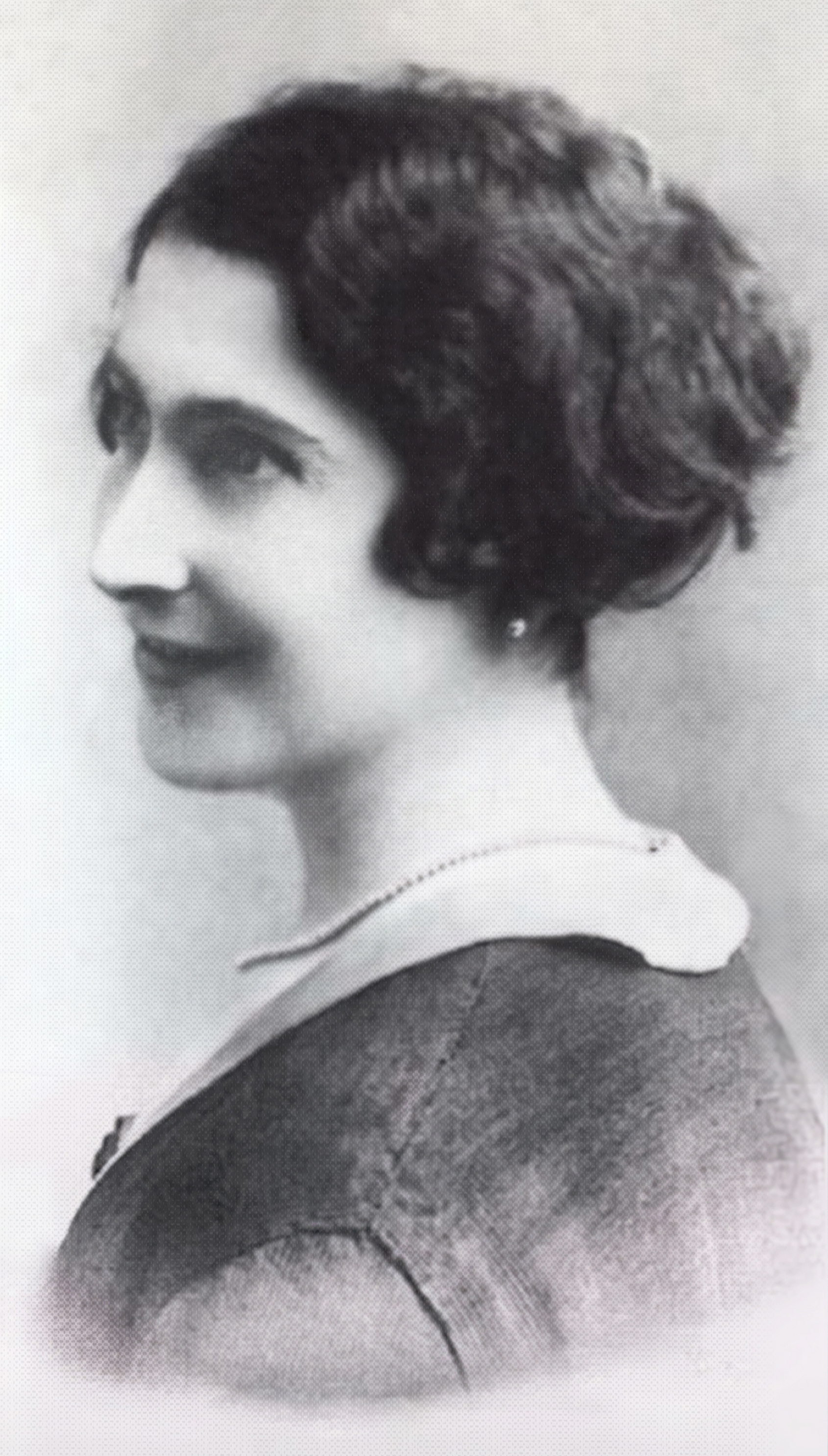
Jeanne Calment, the world's oldest verified person, lived to the age of 122 years, 164 days.

These are lists of the 100 known verified oldest people sorted in descending order by age in years and days. (Note: The exact lifespan of people listed with the same number of years and days may differ because of leap days that occurred during their lifetime.) The oldest person ever whose age has been independently verified is Jeanne Calment (1875–1997) of France, who lived to the age of 122 years and 164 days. The oldest verified man ever is Jiroemon Kimura (1897–2013) of Japan, who lived to the age of 116 years and 54 days.

The oldest known living person is Ethel Caterham of the United Kingdom, aged 117 years, 93 days. The oldest known living man is João Marinho Neto of Brazil, aged 114 years, 48 days. The 100 oldest women have, on average, lived several years longer than the 100 oldest men.

== 100 verified oldest women ==
The list includes supercentenarians validated by organisations specialising in extreme age verification such as the Gerontology Research Group (GRG), with, in some cases, press coverage as a supplementary source.

Deceased Living

Rank	Name	Birth date	Death date	Age	Country of death or residence
1	Jeanne Calment	21 February 1875	4 August 1997	122 years, 164 days	France
2	Kane Tanaka	2 January 1903	19 April 2022	119 years, 107 days	Japan
3	Sarah Knauss	24 September 1880	30 December 1999	119 years, 97 days	United States
4	Lucile Randon	11 February 1904	17 January 2023	118 years, 340 days	France
5	Nabi Tajima	4 August 1900	21 April 2018	117 years, 260 days	Japan
6	Marie-Louise Meilleur	29 August 1880	16 April 1998	117 years, 230 days	Canada
7	Violet Brown	10 March 1900	15 September 2017	117 years, 189 days	Jamaica (Note: Born in Jamaica, then a British colony.)
8	Maria Branyas	4 March 1907	19 August 2024	117 years, 168 days	Spain (Note: Branyas was born in the United States.)
9	Emma Morano	29 November 1899	15 April 2017	117 years, 137 days	Italy
10	Ethel Caterham	21 August 1909	Living	117 years, 93 days	United Kingdom
11	Chiyo Miyako	2 May 1901	22 July 2018	117 years, 81 days	Japan
12	Delphia Welford	9 September 1875 (Note: Some uncertainty remains regarding Delphia Welford's exact date of birth, which during her lifetime was never given as 9 September 1875, and is recorded as “April 1876” in the 1900 census, which would correspond to an age-at-death of 116 years and 198 to 228 days. Her gravestone gives a date of birth of 15 October 1881, corresponding to an age of 111, and that age is also given in her obituary.)	14 November 1992	117 years, 66 days	United States
13	Misao Okawa	5 March 1898	1 April 2015	117 years, 27 days	Japan
14	Francisca Celsa dos Santos	21 October 1904	5 October 2021	116 years, 349 days	Brazil
15	María Capovilla	14 September 1889	27 August 2006	116 years, 347 days	Ecuador
16	Inah Canabarro Lucas	8 June 1908	30 April 2025	116 years, 326 days	Brazil
17	Susannah Mushatt Jones	6 July 1899	12 May 2016	116 years, 311 days	United States
18	Gertrude Weaver	4 July 1898	6 April 2015	116 years, 276 days	United States
19	Fusa Tatsumi	25 April 1907	12 December 2023	116 years, 231 days	Japan
20	Antonia da Santa Cruz	13 June 1905	23 January 2022	116 years, 224 days	Brazil
21	Tomiko Itooka	23 May 1908	29 December 2024	116 years, 220 days	Japan
22	Tane Ikai	18 January 1879	12 July 1995	116 years, 175 days	Japan
23	Jeanne Bot	14 January 1905	22 May 2021	116 years, 128 days	France
24	Elizabeth Bolden	15 August 1890	11 December 2006	116 years, 118 days	United States
25	Besse Cooper	26 August 1896	4 December 2012	116 years, 100 days	United States
26	Maria Giuseppa Robucci	20 March 1903	18 June 2019	116 years, 90 days	Italy
27	Tekla Juniewicz	10 June 1906	19 August 2022	116 years, 70 days	Poland (Note: Juniewicz was born in Krupsko near Lviv, then in Austria-Hungary, now in Ukraine.)
28	Naomi Whitehead	26 September 1910	Living	116 years, 57 days	United States
29	Ana María Vela Rubio	29 October 1901	15 December 2017	116 years, 47 days	Spain
30	Giuseppina Projetto	30 May 1902	6 July 2018	116 years, 37 days	Italy
31	Easter Wiggins	1 June 1874	7 July 1990	116 years, 36 days	United States
32	Jeralean Talley	23 May 1899	17 June 2015	116 years, 25 days	United States
33	Edith Ceccarelli	5 February 1908	22 February 2024	116 years, 17 days	United States
34	Lucia Laura Sangenito	22 November 1910	Living	116 years, 0 days	Italy
35	Ella Miller	6 December 1884	21 November 2000	115 years, 351 days	United States
36	Shigeyo Nakachi	1 February 1905	11 January 2021	115 years, 345 days	Japan
37	Maggie Barnes (Note: May have been older (116 or 117); possibly born in 1881 or 1880.)	6 March 1882	19 January 1998	115 years, 319 days	United States
38	Yolanda Beltrão de Azevedo	13 January 1911	Living	115 years, 313 days	Brazil
39	Marie-Rose Tessier	21 May 1910	10 February 2026	115 years, 265 days	France
40	Dina Manfredini	4 April 1897	17 December 2012	115 years, 257 days	United States (Note: Manfredini was born in Italy.)
41	Shimoe Akiyama	19 May 1903	29 January 2019	115 years, 255 days	Japan
42	Hester Ford	15 August 1905	17 April 2021	115 years, 245 days	United States
43	Okagi Hayashi	2 September 1909	26 April 2025	115 years, 236 days	Japan
44	Charlotte Hughes	1 August 1877	17 March 1993	115 years, 228 days	United Kingdom
45	Edna Parker	20 April 1893	26 November 2008	115 years, 220 days	United States
46	Mary Ann Rhodes	12 August 1882	3 March 1998	115 years, 203 days	Canada
47	Anonymous of Tokyo	15 March 1900	27 September 2015	115 years, 196 days	Japan
48	Margaret Skeete	27 October 1878	7 May 1994	115 years, 192 days	United States
49	Magdalena Oliver Gabarró	31 October 1903	1 May 2019	115 years, 182 days	Spain
50	Bernice Madigan	24 July 1899	3 January 2015	115 years, 163 days	United States
51	Gertrude Baines	6 April 1894	11 September 2009	115 years, 158 days	United States
52	Beatriz Ferreira Duarte	21 June 1911	Living	115 years, 154 days	Brazil
53	Bettie Wilson	13 September 1890	13 February 2006	115 years, 153 days	United States
54	Shin Matsushita	30 March 1904	27 August 2019	115 years, 150 days	Japan
55	Iris Westman	28 August 1905	3 January 2021	115 years, 128 days	United States
56	Julie Winnefred Bertrand	16 September 1891	18 January 2007	115 years, 124 days	Canada
57	Maria de Jesus	10 September 1893	2 January 2009	115 years, 114 days	Portugal
58	Marie-Josephine Gaudette	25 March 1902	13 July 2017	115 years, 110 days	Italy (Note: Gaudette was born in the United States.)
59	Susie Gibson	31 October 1890	16 February 2006	115 years, 108 days	United States
59	Thelma Sutcliffe	1 October 1906	17 January 2022	115 years, 108 days	United States
61	Edna Kern	14 October 1900	20 January 2016	115 years, 98 days	United States
62	Shigeko Kagawa	28 May 1911	27 August 2026	115 years, 91 days	Japan
63	Elizabeth Francis	25 July 1909	22 October 2024	115 years, 89 days	United States
64	Casilda Benegas Gallego	8 April 1907	28 June 2022	115 years, 81 days	Argentina (Note: Benegas Gallego was born in Paraguay.)
65	Augusta Holtz	3 August 1871	21 October 1986	115 years, 79 days	United States (Note: Holtz was born in the German Empire; her birthplace is now in Poland.)
66	Guillermina Acosta Bilbao	27 November 1901	13 February 2017	115 years, 78 days	Panama (Note: Bilbao was born in a part of Colombia that is now Panama.)
67	Valentine Ligny	22 October 1906	4 January 2022	115 years, 74 days	France
68	Hendrikje van Andel-Schipper	29 June 1890	30 August 2005	115 years, 62 days	Netherlands
69	Bessie Hendricks	7 November 1907	3 January 2023	115 years, 57 days	United States
70	Mina Kitagawa	3 November 1905	19 December 2020	115 years, 46 days	Japan
71	Marie Brémont	25 April 1886	6 June 2001	115 years, 42 days	France
72	Yoshi Otsunari	17 December 1906	26 January 2022	115 years, 40 days	Japan
73	Katie Hatton	18 December 1876	24 January 1992	115 years, 37 days	United States
74	Maude Farris-Luse	21 February 1887	18 March 2002	115 years, 25 days	United States
75	Koto Okubo	24 December 1897	12 January 2013	115 years, 19 days	Japan
76	Antonia Gerena Rivera	19 May 1900	2 June 2015	115 years, 14 days	United States (Note: Gerena Rivera was born in Puerto Rico.)
77	Chiyono Hasegawa	20 November 1896	2 December 2011	115 years, 12 days	Japan
78	Annie Jennings	12 November 1884	20 November 1999	115 years, 8 days	United Kingdom
79	Anonymous of Hyōgo	29 April 1907	30 April 2022	115 years, 1 day	Japan
80	Eva Morris	8 November 1885	2 November 2000	114 years, 360 days	United Kingdom
81	Klavdiya Gadyuchkina	5 December 1910	29 November 2025	114 years, 359 days	Russia
82	Kama Chinen	10 May 1895	2 May 2010	114 years, 357 days	Japan
83	Mary Bidwell	9 May 1881	25 April 1996	114 years, 352 days	United States
84	Sofia Rojas	13 August 1907	30 July 2022	114 years, 351 days	Colombia
85	Maria Gomes Valentim	9 July 1896	21 June 2011	114 years, 347 days	Brazil
86	Izabel Rosa Pereira	13 October 1910	24 September 2025	114 years, 346 days	Brazil
87	Hazel Plummer	19 June 1908	25 May 2023	114 years, 340 days	United States
88	Ophelia Burks	25 October 1903	27 September 2018	114 years, 337 days	United States
88	Fuyo Kishimoto	20 December 1911	Living	114 years, 337 days	Japan
90	Ella Gantt	30 November 1886	28 October 2001	114 years, 332 days	United States
91	Eliza Underwood	15 March 1866	27 January 1981	114 years, 318 days	United States
92	Kahoru Furuya	18 February 1908	25 December 2022	114 years, 310 days	Japan
93	Mary Josephine Ray	17 May 1895	7 March 2010	114 years, 294 days	United States (Note: Ray was born in Canada.)
94	Goldie Steinberg	30 October 1900	16 August 2015	114 years, 290 days	United States (Note: Steinberg was born in Chișinău, then part of the Russian Empire, now the capital of Moldova.)
95	Andrée Bertoletto	1 January 1911	16 October 2025	114 years, 288 days	France
96	Kiyoko Ishiguro	4 March 1901	5 December 2015	114 years, 276 days	Japan
97	Maria do Couto Maia-Lopes	24 October 1890	25 July 2005	114 years, 274 days	Portugal
97	Eudoxie Baboul	1 October 1901	1 July 2016	114 years, 274 days	France (French Guiana)
99	Ramona Trinidad Iglesias Jordan	1 September 1889	29 May 2004	114 years, 271 days	Puerto Rico
99	Yukie Hino	17 April 1902	13 January 2017	114 years, 271 days	Japan

== 100 verified oldest men ==
The list includes supercentenarians validated by an organisation specialising in extreme age verification such as the Gerontology Research Group (GRG), with, in some cases, press coverage as a supplementary source.

Deceased Living

Rank	Name	Birth date	Death date	Age	Country of death or residence
1	Jiroemon Kimura	19 April 1897	12 June 2013	116 years, 54 days	Japan
2	Christian Mortensen	16 August 1882	25 April 1998	115 years, 252 days	United States (Note: Mortensen was born in Denmark.)
3	Emiliano Mercado del Toro	21 August 1891	24 January 2007	115 years, 156 days	Puerto Rico
4	Juan Vicente Pérez	27 May 1909	2 April 2024	114 years, 311 days	Venezuela
5	Horacio Celi Mendoza	3 January 1897	25 September 2011	114 years, 265 days	Peru
6	Walter Breuning	21 September 1896	14 April 2011	114 years, 205 days	United States
7	Yukichi Chuganji	23 March 1889	28 September 2003	114 years, 189 days	Japan
8	Tomás Pinales Figuereo	31 March 1906	24 September 2020	114 years, 177 days	Dominican Republic
9	Joan Riudavets	15 December 1889	5 March 2004	114 years, 81 days	Spain
10	João Marinho Neto	5 October 1912	Living	114 years, 48 days	Brazil
11	Fred Harold Hale	1 December 1890	19 November 2004	113 years, 354 days	United States
12	Israel Kristal	15 September 1903	11 August 2017	113 years, 330 days	Israel (Note: Kristal was born in Maleniec, then part of the Russian Empire, now in Poland.)
13	Efraín Antonio Ríos García	4 April 1910	11 January 2024	113 years, 282 days	Colombia
14	Tomoji Tanabe	18 September 1895	19 June 2009	113 years, 274 days	Japan
15	John Ingram McMorran	19 June 1889	24 February 2003	113 years, 250 days	United States
16	Masazō Nonaka	25 July 1905	20 January 2019	113 years, 179 days	Japan
17	Mauro Ambriz Tapia	21 November 1897	18 April 2011	113 years, 148 days	Mexico
18	Frederick Frazier	27 January 1880	14 June 1993	113 years, 138 days	United States
19	Eusebio Quintero López	6 March 1910	16 July 2023	113 years, 132 days	Colombia
20	Donald Butler	21 August 1885	27 December 1998	113 years, 128 days	United States
21	James Sisnett	22 February 1900	23 May 2013	113 years, 90 days	Barbados (Note: Sisnett was born in Barbados, which was at the time of his birth part of the British colony of the Leeward Islands; it is now an independent country.)
21	Wenceslao Leyva González	28 September 1903	27 December 2016	113 years, 90 days	Mexico
23	Domingo Villa Avisencio	26 August 1906	3 November 2019	113 years, 69 days	Mexico
24	Walter Richardson	7 November 1885	25 December 1998	113 years, 48 days	United States
24	Ken Weeks	5 October 1913	Living	113 years, 48 days	Australia
26	Francisco Núñez Olivera	13 December 1904	29 January 2018	113 years, 47 days	Spain
27	Henry Allingham	6 June 1896	18 July 2009	113 years, 42 days	United Kingdom
28	Emilio Flores Márquez	8 August 1908	12 August 2021	113 years, 4 days	Puerto Rico
29	Chitetsu Watanabe	5 March 1907	23 February 2020	112 years, 355 days	Japan
30	Ilie Ciocan	10 June 1913	27 May 2026	112 years, 351 days	Romania
31	Antonio Todde	22 January 1889	3 January 2002	112 years, 346 days	Italy
32	Saturnino de la Fuente García	11 February 1909	18 January 2022	112 years, 341 days	Spain
33	Moses Hardy	6 January 1894	7 December 2006	112 years, 335 days	United States
34	Yasutaro Koide	13 March 1903	19 January 2016	112 years, 312 days	Japan
35	John Evans	19 August 1877	10 June 1990	112 years, 295 days	United Kingdom
36	Shi Ping	1 November 1911	29 June 2024	112 years, 241 days	China
37	Richard Arvin Overton	11 May 1906	27 December 2018	112 years, 230 days	United States
38	Delio Venturotti	25 October 1909	1 June 2022	112 years, 219 days	Brazil (Note: Venturotti was born in Italy.)
39	Denzō Ishizaki (Note: Although the Gerontology Research Group verified Ishizaki's birth date as 20 October 1886, he claimed himself to be born in 1884 and asserted that his birth record was "delayed by two years". LongeviQuest subsequently determined Ishizaki was born 18 days earlier than previously believed, based on family records.)	2 October 1886	29 April 1999	112 years, 209 days	Japan
40	George Francis	6 June 1896	27 December 2008	112 years, 204 days	United States
40	Hikaru Katō	2 May 1914	Living	112 years, 204 days	Japan
42	James King	15 November 1854	5 June 1967	112 years, 202 days	United States
43	Georges Thomas	19 November 1911	1 June 2024	112 years, 195 days	France
44	Josino Levino Ferreira	3 April 1913	5 October 2025	112 years, 185 days	Brazil
45	Josep Armengol	23 July 1881	20 January 1994	112 years, 181 days	Spain
46	Giovanni Frau	29 December 1890	19 June 2003	112 years, 172 days	Italy
47	Vitantonio Lovallo	28 March 1914	15 September 2026	112 years, 171 days	Italy
48	John Painter	20 September 1888	1 March 2001	112 years, 162 days	United States
49	Marcel Meys	12 July 1909	15 December 2021	112 years, 156 days	France
50	Masamitsu Yoshida	30 May 1904	29 October 2016	112 years, 152 days	Japan
51	Sakari Momoi	5 February 1903	5 July 2015	112 years, 150 days	Japan
52	Gisaburō Sonobe	6 November 1911	31 March 2024	112 years, 146 days	Japan
53	Efraín Núñez Núñez	28 December 1904	22 May 2017	112 years, 145 days	Dominican Republic
54	Alphaeus Philemon Cole	12 July 1876	25 November 1988	112 years, 136 days	United States
55	Augusto Moreira	6 October 1896	13 February 2009	112 years, 130 days	Portugal
56	João Zanol	13 October 1907	12 February 2020	112 years, 122 days	Brazil
57	George Johnson	1 May 1894	30 August 2006	112 years, 121 days	United States
57	Mikizō Ueda	11 May 1910	9 September 2022	112 years, 121 days	Japan
59	Lawrence Brooks	12 September 1909	5 January 2022	112 years, 115 days	United States
60	Salustiano Sanchez	8 June 1901	13 September 2013	112 years, 97 days	United States (Note: Sanchez was born in Spain.)
61	Park Fountain Heard	18 May 1882	18 August 1994	112 years, 92 days	United States
62	John Tinniswood	26 August 1912	25 November 2024	112 years, 91 days	United Kingdom
63	CP Crawford	25 August 1907	23 November 2019	112 years, 90 days	United States
64	Jorge Durán Coral	23 April 1909	21 July 2021	112 years, 89 days	Mexico
65	Yoshikazu Yamashita	10 April 1907	7 July 2019	112 years, 88 days	Japan
66	Gengan Tonaki	30 October 1884	24 January 1997	112 years, 86 days	Japan
67	Robert Weighton	29 March 1908	28 May 2020	112 years, 60 days	United Kingdom
68	Tadanosuke Hashimoto	27 April 1891	31 May 2003	112 years, 34 days	Japan
69	Kumekichi Tani	20 April 1891	12 May 2003	112 years, 22 days	Japan
70	Ernest Peronneau	7 March 1902	26 March 2014	112 years, 19 days	United States
71	Tokuji Tanigaki	8 November 1914	Living	112 years, 14 days	Japan
72	George Feldman	2 December 1906	2 December 2018	112 years, 0 days	United States
73	Tsunahei Ogawa	9 January 1907	4 January 2019	111 years, 360 days	Japan
74	Arturo Licata	2 May 1902	24 April 2014	111 years, 357 days	Italy
75	Stanisław Kowalski	14 April 1910	5 April 2022	111 years, 356 days	Poland (Note: Kowalski was born in Rogówek, then part of the Russian Empire, now in Poland.)
76	Silverio Pereira Ayala	11 June 1906	30 May 2018	111 years, 353 days	Paraguay
77	Julio Saldarriaga Hernández	3 November 1913	10 October 2025	111 years, 341 days	Colombia
77	Primo Olivieri	7 March 1914	11 February 2026	111 years, 341 days	Brazil
79	Walter H. Seward	13 October 1896	14 September 2008	111 years, 337 days	United States
80	Francisco Ernesto Filho	5 April 1914	6 March 2026	111 years, 335 days	Brazil
81	Kiyotaka Mizuno	14 March 1914	8 February 2026	111 years, 331 days	Japan
82	Faustino Vargas Pérez	27 September 1896	20 August 2008	111 years, 328 days	Costa Rica
83	Maurice Floquet	25 December 1894	10 November 2006	111 years, 320 days	France
84	Valerio Piroddi	13 November 1905	18 September 2017	111 years, 309 days	Italy
85	Shigeru Nakamura	11 January 1911	15 November 2022	111 years, 308 days	Japan
86	Arthur Nash	7 January 1885	4 November 1996	111 years, 302 days	Canada (Note: Nash was born in the United Kingdom.)
87	James McCoubrey	13 September 1901	5 July 2013	111 years, 295 days	United States (Note: McCoubrey was born in Newfoundland, then a separate British colony, now part of Canada.)
88	Ryōji Shinoda	30 November 1914	19 September 2026	111 years, 293 days	Japan
89	Ezra Hill	19 December 1910	4 October 2022	111 years, 289 days	United States
90	John Mosley Turner	15 June 1856	21 March 1968	111 years, 280 days	United Kingdom
91	Hermann Dörnemann	27 May 1893	2 March 2005	111 years, 279 days	Germany
92	Hilario Orozco Lemus	3 November 1913	5 August 2025	111 years, 275 days	Mexico
93	Laurence Thompson	23 January 1887	24 October 1998	111 years, 274 days	United States
94	Agustín Reyes Ortiz	8 February 1887	6 November 1998	111 years, 271 days	Puerto Rico
95	Antonio Urrea Hernandez	18 February 1888	15 November 1999	111 years, 270 days	Spain
96	Choki Miyagi	15 November 1904	7 August 2016	111 years, 266 days	Japan
97	Reuben Sinclair	5 December 1911	27 August 2023	111 years, 265 days	Canada
98	Luis Gonzaga Carrasco-Muñoz; Pérez de la Isla	13 February 1914	29 October 2025	111 years, 258 days	Spain
99	Maurice Le Coutour	12 May 1914	23 January 2026	111 years, 256 days	France
100	Arthur Carter	5 October 1889	11 June 2001	111 years, 249 days	United States
