= List of American supercentenarians =

Americans who have lived to be at least 110

American supercentenarians are citizens or residents of the United States who have attained or surpassed 110 years of age. By January 2015, the Gerontology Research Group (GRG) had validated the longevity claims of 782 American supercentenarians. The oldest living American is Naomi Whitehead (born in Georgia on September 26, 1910, and residing in Greenville, Pennsylvania), aged 116 years, 56 days. The longest-lived American ever was Sarah Knauss, of Hollywood, Luzerne County, Pennsylvania, who died on December 30, 1999, aged 119 years and 97 days. The oldest validated American man ever is Danish-born Christian Mortensen, who immigrated to the United States at age 21 in 1903. The oldest validated American-born man ever is Walter Breuning.

Gerontology researcher Robert Young, then-affiliated with the Gerontology Research Group, noted in 2008 that African-Americans are disproportionately represented among validated American 115+ year-olds, explicitly reviewing the evidence in favor of cases such as Elizabeth Bolden, Maggie Barnes, and Bettie Wilson.

== 100 oldest known Americans ever ==
Below is a list of the 100 longest-lived American supercentenarians, according to the GRG and reliable sourcing.

Deceased Living

Rank	Name	Sex	Birth date	Death date	Age	Birthplace	Place of death or residence
1	Sarah Knauss	F	September 24, 1880	December 30, 1999	119 years, 97 days	Pennsylvania	Pennsylvania
2	María Branyas Morera	F	March 4, 1907	August 19, 2024	117 years, 168 days	California	Spain
3	Delphia Welford	F	September 9, 1875	November 14, 1992	117 years, 66 days	Mississippi	Tennessee
4	Susannah Mushatt Jones	F	July 6, 1899	May 12, 2016	116 years, 311 days	Alabama	New York
5	Gertrude Weaver	F	July 4, 1898	April 6, 2015	116 years, 276 days	Arkansas	Arkansas
6	Elizabeth Bolden	F	August 15, 1890	December 11, 2006	116 years, 118 days	Tennessee	Tennessee
7	Besse Cooper	F	August 26, 1896	December 4, 2012	116 years, 100 days	Tennessee	Georgia
8	Naomi Whitehead	F	September 26, 1910	Living	116 years, 56 days	Georgia	Pennsylvania
9	Easter Wiggins	F	June 1, 1874	July 7, 1990	116 years, 36 days	Mississippi	Mississippi
10	Jeralean Talley	F	May 23, 1899	June 17, 2015	116 years, 25 days	Georgia	Michigan
11	Edith Ceccarelli	F	February 5, 1908	February 22, 2024	116 years, 17 days	California	California
12	Ella Miller	F	December 6, 1884	November 21, 2000	115 years, 351 days	Tennessee	Virginia
13	Maggie Barnes	F	March 6, 1882	January 19, 1998	115 years, 319 days	North Carolina	North Carolina
14	Dina Manfredini	F	April 4, 1897	December 17, 2012	115 years, 257 days	Italy	Iowa
15	Christian Mortensen	M	August 16, 1882	April 25, 1998	115 years, 252 days	Denmark	California
16	Hester Ford	F	August 15, 1905	April 17, 2021	115 years, 245 days	South Carolina	North Carolina
17	Edna Parker	F	April 20, 1893	November 26, 2008	115 years, 220 days	Indiana	Indiana
18	Margaret Skeete	F	October 27, 1878	May 7, 1994	115 years, 192 days	Texas	Virginia
19	Bernice Madigan	F	July 24, 1899	January 3, 2015	115 years, 163 days	Massachusetts	Massachusetts
20	Gertrude Baines	F	April 6, 1894	September 11, 2009	115 years, 158 days	Georgia	California
21	Emiliano Mercado del Toro	M	August 21, 1891	January 24, 2007	115 years, 156 days	Puerto Rico (Note: Mercado and Iglesias Jordan were born in Puerto Rico, which at the time of their births was a part of the Spanish Empire, it is now an unincorporated territory of the United States.)	Puerto Rico
22	Bettie Wilson	F	September 13, 1890	February 13, 2006	115 years, 153 days	Mississippi	Mississippi
23	Iris Westman	F	August 28, 1905	January 3, 2021	115 years, 128 days	North Dakota	North Dakota
24	Marie-Josephine Gaudette	F	March 25, 1902	July 13, 2017	115 years, 110 days	New Hampshire	Italy
25	Susie Gibson	F	October 31, 1890	February 16, 2006	115 years, 108 days	Mississippi	Alabama
25	Thelma Sutcliffe	F	October 1, 1906	January 17, 2022	115 years, 108 days	Nebraska	Nebraska
27	Edna Kern	F	October 14, 1900	January 20, 2016	115 years, 98 days	California	Nevada
28	Elizabeth Francis	F	July 25, 1909	October 22, 2024	115 years, 89 days	Louisiana	Texas
29	Augusta Holtz	F	August 3, 1871	October 21, 1986	115 years, 79 days	Germany (Note: Holtz was born in the Province of Posen, which was a part of the German Empire at the time of her birth. Today, this area is a part of Poland.)	Missouri
30	Bessie Hendricks	F	November 7, 1907	January 3, 2023	115 years, 57 days	Iowa	Iowa
31	Katie Hatton	F	December 18, 1876	January 24, 1992	115 years, 37 days	Texas	Texas
32	Maud Farris-Luse	F	February 21, 1887	March 18, 2002	115 years, 25 days	Michigan	Michigan
33	Antonia Gerena Rivera	F	May 19, 1900	June 2, 2015	115 years, 14 days	Puerto Rico (Note: Residents of Puerto Rico born on or after April 25, 1898, are United States citizens.)	Florida
34	Mary Bidwell	F	May 9, 1881	April 25, 1996	114 years, 352 days	Connecticut	Connecticut
35	Hazel Plummer	F	June 19, 1908	May 25, 2023	114 years, 340 days	Massachusetts	Massachusetts
36	Ophelia Burks	F	October 25, 1903	September 27, 2018	114 years, 337 days	Louisiana	Louisiana
37	Ella Gantt	F	November 30, 1886	October 28, 2001	114 years, 332 days	Georgia	Georgia
38	Eliza Underwood	F	March 15, 1866	January 27, 1981	114 years, 318 days	North Carolina	District of Columbia
39	Mary Josephine Ray	F	May 17, 1895	March 7, 2010	114 years, 294 days	Canada	New Hampshire
40	Goldie Steinberg	F	October 30, 1900	August 16, 2015	114 years, 290 days	Moldova (Note: Steinberg was born in Kishinev, which had then been a part of the Russian Empire. It is now the capital of Moldova.)	New York
41	Ramona Trinidad Iglesias Jordan	F	September 1, 1889	May 29, 2004	114 years, 271 days	Puerto Rico	Puerto Rico
42	Delphine Gibson	F	August 17, 1903	May 9, 2018	114 years, 265 days	South Carolina	Pennsylvania
43	Mary Royster	F	April 15, 1875	December 28, 1989	114 years, 257 days	Virginia	North Carolina
44	Bonita Gibson	F	July 4, 1911	March 10, 2026	114 years, 249 days	Kansas	Michigan
45	Neva Morris	F	August 3, 1895	April 6, 2010	114 years, 246 days	Iowa	Iowa
46	Mary Ana Long	F	February 18, 1905	October 16, 2019	114 years, 240 days	Kentucky	Kentucky
47	Blanche Cobb	F	September 8, 1900	May 1, 2015	114 years, 235 days	Georgia	Florida
48	Mila Mangold	F	November 14, 1907	July 2, 2022	114 years, 230 days	Nebraska	California
49	Myrtle Dorsey	F	November 20, 1885	June 25, 2000	114 years, 218 days	Ohio	Ohio
50	Carrie Lazenby	F	February 9, 1882	September 4, 1996	114 years, 208 days	Georgia	Illinois
51	Walter Breuning	M	September 21, 1896	April 14, 2011	114 years, 205 days	Minnesota	Montana
52	Eunice Sanborn	F	July 20, 1896	January 31, 2011	114 years, 195 days	Louisiana	Texas
53	Grace Clawson	F	November 15, 1887	May 28, 2002	114 years, 194 days	United Kingdom	Florida
54	Wilhelmina Kott	F	March 7, 1880	September 6, 1994	114 years, 183 days	Illinois	Illinois
54	Adelina Domingues	F	February 19, 1888	August 21, 2002	114 years, 183 days	Cape Verde (Note: Domingues was born in Cape Verde, which was at that time a Portuguese colony. Now it is an independent country.)	California
56	Lucy Mirigian	F	August 15, 1906	February 12, 2021	114 years, 181 days	Armenia (Note: Mirigian was born in Western Armenia, then part of the Ottoman Empire.)	California
57	Charlotte Benkner	F	November 16, 1889	May 14, 2004	114 years, 180 days	Germany	Ohio
58	Ilse Meingast	F	March 14, 1912	August 23, 2026	114 years, 162 days	Germany	California
59	Ettie Mae Greene	F	September 19, 1877	February 26, 1992	114 years, 160 days	West Virginia	West Virginia
60	Dominga Velasco	F	May 12, 1901	October 11, 2015	114 years, 152 days	Mexico	California
61	Irene Frank	F	October 1, 1881	February 28, 1996	114 years, 150 days	Texas	Missouri
62	Georgia Ella Jordan	F	September 18, 1880	February 9, 1995	114 years, 144 days	Georgia	Virginia
63	Olivia Patricia Thomas	F	June 29, 1895	November 16, 2009	114 years, 140 days	Iowa	New York
63	Alelia Murphy	F	July 6, 1905	November 23, 2019	114 years, 140 days	North Carolina	New York
65	Irene Dunham	F	December 16, 1907	May 1, 2022	114 years, 136 days	Michigan	Michigan
66	Nina Willis	F	January 14, 1909	May 17, 2023	114 years, 123 days	Georgia	Georgia
66	Pearl Berg	F	October 1, 1909	February 1, 2024	114 years, 123 days	Indiana	California
68	Anna Henderson	F	March 5, 1900	July 1, 2014	114 years, 118 days	Georgia	Pennsylvania
69	Emma Verona Johnston	F	August 6, 1890	December 1, 2004	114 years, 117 days	Iowa	Ohio
69	Mamie Rearden	F	September 7, 1898	January 2, 2013	114 years, 117 days	South Carolina	Georgia
69	Erna Zahn	F	April 14, 1908	August 9, 2022	114 years, 117 days	Wisconsin	Minnesota
72	Bettie Chatmon	F	April 30, 1884	August 16, 1998	114 years, 108 days	Louisiana	Texas
72	Lessie Brown	F	September 22, 1904	January 8, 2019	114 years, 108 days	Georgia	Ohio
74	Odie Matthews	F	December 28, 1878	April 14, 1993	114 years, 107 days	Texas	Arizona
75	Mary Harris	F	May 13, 1911	August 22, 2025	114 years, 101 days	New York	Tennessee
76	Florence Knapp	F	October 10, 1873	January 11, 1988	114 years, 93 days	Pennsylvania	Pennsylvania
76	Elena Slough	F	July 4, 1889	October 5, 2003	114 years, 93 days	Pennsylvania	New Jersey
78	Mary Anna Boone	F	February 10, 1887	May 13, 2001	114 years, 92 days	Kentucky	Kentucky
79	Minnie Whicker	F	July 24, 1906	October 22, 2020	114 years, 90 days	Arkansas	California
80	Delma Kollar	F	October 31, 1897	January 24, 2012	114 years, 85 days	Kansas	Oregon
81	Ila Jones	F	August 21, 1903	November 10, 2017	114 years, 81 days	Georgia	Georgia
82	Lugenie Jeffers	F	June 4, 1879	August 18, 1993	114 years, 75 days	Texas	Texas
83	Maggie Renfro	F	November 14, 1895	January 22, 2010	114 years, 69 days	Louisiana	Louisiana
84	Emma Tillman	F	November 22, 1892	January 28, 2007	114 years, 67 days	North Carolina	Connecticut
84	Anna Stoehr	F	October 15, 1900	December 21, 2014	114 years, 67 days	Iowa	Minnesota
86	Leila Denmark	F	February 1, 1898	April 1, 2012	114 years, 60 days	Georgia	Georgia
87	Adele Dunlap	F	December 12, 1902	February 5, 2017	114 years, 55 days	New Jersey	New Jersey
88	Naomi Conner	F	August 30, 1899	October 18, 2013	114 years, 49 days	Texas	Texas
88	Ora Holland	F	December 24, 1900	February 11, 2015	114 years, 49 days	Missouri	Oklahoma
90	Catherine Ferrell	F	October 10, 1912	Living	114 years, 42 days	North Carolina	North Carolina
91	Winnie Felps	F	October 10, 1911	November 20, 2025	114 years, 41 days	Texas	Texas
92	Ellen Goodwill	F	February 2, 1907	March 2, 2021	114 years, 28 days	Kentucky	Michigan
93	Grace Thaxton	F	June 18, 1891	July 6, 2005	114 years, 18 days	New York	Kentucky
94	Soledad Mexia	F	August 13, 1899	August 30, 2013	114 years, 17 days	Mexico	California
95	Minnie Ward	F	November 19, 1885	December 2, 1999	114 years, 13 days	Tennessee	Massachusetts
96	Arbella Ewing	F	March 13, 1894	March 22, 2008	114 years, 9 days	Texas	Texas
97	Catherine Hagel	F	November 28, 1894	December 6, 2008	114 years, 8 days	Minnesota	Minnesota
98	Emma Otis	F	October 22, 1901	October 25, 2015	114 years, 3 days	Washington	Washington
99	Anna Natella	F	November 21, 1912	Living	114 years, 0 days	Italy	Florida
100	Ellen Jurick	F	July 15, 1895	July 13, 2009	113 years, 363 days	Pennsylvania	Michigan

== Biographies ==
=== Delphia Welford ===
Delphia S. Welford (September 9, 1875 – November 14, 1992) was an American supercentenarian claimed to have been born on September 9, 1881, although research conducted by the Gerontology Research Group between 2016 and 2023 concluded that she was actually born in 1875, and that she was born in Okolona, Mississippi. Subsequently, LongeviQuest conducted similar research and analysis and reached an identical conclusion.

Welford's parents were Richard and Heddie Welford. The family moved to Humboldt, Tennessee, when she was a teenager. She had one son, Leo Mathis, in the late 1890s. Welford never married and spent the rest of her life in Humboldt. She was a homemaker and a member of the Lane Chapel C.M.E Church.

Welford died at Parkview Manor Health Care Center in Humboldt, on November 14, 1992, at the age of 117 years, 66 days. She had been the oldest person ever from the United States after surpassing the age of Easter Wiggins on October 16, 1991. Welford would continue to hold this distinction until November 30, 1997, when Sarah Knauss surpassed her final age.

=== Mary Bidwell ===
Mary Electa Bidwell (May 9, 1881 – April 25, 1996) was an American supercentenarian. She died aged 114 years and 352 days and is the oldest person on record ever to die in Connecticut.

Her parents were Charles Woodruff Bidwell and Alice Beach Nobel. She was a descendant of John Bidwell, one of the founders of Hartford, Connecticut. Bidwell worked as a teacher in a one-room schoolhouse for six years. She married Charles Hubbell Bidwell, a distant cousin, in 1906. Bidwell lived on her own in North Haven, Connecticut, until she was 110. Bidwell died at the Arden House, a nursing home in Hamden, Connecticut.

=== Maggie Barnes ===
Maggie Pauline Barnes (née Hinnant; c. March 6, between 1880 and 1882 – January 19, 1998) was an American supercentenarian. She was born to a former slave and married a tenant farmer. Barnes died on January 19, 1998, in Johnston County, North Carolina, of gangrene.

Her exact year of birth has been disputed. Though the year 1882 is written in her family bible, her marriage license claims that she was born in 1880.

=== Adelina Domingues ===
Adelina Domingues (February 19, 1888 – August 21, 2002) was a Cape Verdean American supercentenarian who was the world's oldest person from the death of 114-year-old British-American woman Grace Clawson on May 28, 2002, to her own death less than three months later. Domingues was born in Cape Verde. Domingues's Italian father was a harbor pilot by profession, and her mother was Portuguese by ethnicity. She married in 1907, and moved to the United States that year. Her husband died from cancer in 1950. Domingues was a missionary from the Church of the Nazarene in Cape Verde and other parts of Africa, and also a religious preacher when she lived in Massachusetts, as well as an expert seamstress.

Domingues was deeply religious, had conservative political views and was a pen pal of former President of the United States Ronald Reagan. She had four children, but only one of them (a son, Frank) reached adulthood. Frank died in 1998 at the age of 71. Domingues died at a nursing home in the San Diego, California, area on August 21, 2002, at age 114 years and 183 days. She had claimed she was actually one year older, but her family and Cape Verdean diplomats did some research and discovered her baptismal information, from which they concluded that Domingues was 114 years old when she died.

=== John Ingram McMorran ===
John Ingram McMorran (June 19, 1889 – February 24, 2003) was an American supercentenarian who, at the time of his death, was recognized as the oldest living man in the United States and the world's second-oldest living man behind Japan's Yukichi Chuganji. Born in a log cabin in Goodland Township, Michigan, McMorran worked a variety of manual labor jobs throughout his life, including manufacturing munitions during World War I and working as a milk deliverer and mail carrier, before finally retiring at the age of 84. He spent 51 years married to his wife, Matie, until her death in 1964, and outlived his entire immediate family, including his only son, Robert. In 1973, he relocated to Lakeland, Florida, where he spent his final decades residing in a local healthcare facility.

McMorran officially became the oldest living validated man in the United States on March 1, 2001, following the death of 112-year-old John George Painter. Family members and caretakers frequently noted his unconventional lifestyle habits for a supercentenarian; he smoked cigarettes and pipes until age 97, enjoyed greasy foods, and famously credited his extreme longevity to drinking a cup of coffee before every single meal. Despite suffering from severe vision and hearing loss in his twilight years, he remained in relatively good health and high spirits. He died of heart failure brought on by complications from pneumonia at the Lakeland Regional Medical Center on February 24, 2003, at the age of 113 years and 250 days.

=== Benjamin Holcomb ===
Benjamin Harrison Holcomb (July 3, 1889 – December 2, 2000) was an American supercentenarian recognized by Guinness World Records as the world's oldest living man in 2000 (before American man John George Painter was discovered to be older). A lifelong farmer in Oklahoma, his life spanned three centuries. He died at age 111 years and 152 days in Carnegie, Oklahoma.

=== Charlotte Benkner ===
Charlotte Benkner (née Enterlein; November 16, 1889 – May 14, 2004) was an American supercentenarian and considered the world's oldest person from 2003 to 2004. Subsequent recognition of other supercentenarians ranked Benkner as the third oldest at the time of her death.

Benkner was born in Leipzig, Germany, and emigrated to the U.S. in 1896. She grew up in Peekskill, New York, where her family ran the Albert Hotel, and as a young woman once met then U.S. President Theodore Roosevelt. After her 1908 marriage to Karl Benkner, she moved west, living in Pennsylvania and Ohio, before retiring to Arizona. Already a supercentenarian and the oldest person in Arizona, Benkner returned to Ohio to live in North Lima with her sister Tillie O'Hare, her youngest sibling. Tillie died in January 2004, just three weeks shy of becoming a centenarian. Benkner survived her sister by only four months, and died at age 114 years and 180 days, after a brief hospital stay in Youngstown, Ohio.

=== Emma Verona Johnston ===
Emma Verona Johnston (née Calhoun; August 6, 1890 – December 1, 2004) was an American supercentenarian who was born in Indianola, Iowa, to a large family. She graduated from Drake University in the Class of 1912 and went on to work as a Latin teacher before she married ophthalmologist Harry Johnston; at the time of her death, she was the university's oldest living graduate.

At age 98, Johnston moved from Iowa to Ohio in order to live with her daughter and son-in-law. Even after turning 110, she continued to be in good health, alert and engaging in conversations, and was still able to walk up steps. She became the oldest known living American in May 2004. Three months later, on the occasion of her 114th birthday, she was presented with a proclamation signed by then Drake University President David Maxwell. The university's vice president for Institutional Advancement, John Willey, nominated her for an honorary degree. Johnston died in Worthington, Ohio, on December 1, 2004, at age 114 years and 117 days.

=== Bettie Wilson ===
Bettie Antry Wilson (née Rutherford; September 13, 1890 – February 13, 2006) was thought to be the oldest living person in the United States from December 2004 until the subsequent verification of Elizabeth Bolden. Both were born in the rural South, where they lived less than 100 miles apart. Wilson was the daughter of freed slaves, Solomon and Delia Rutherford.

In April 2005, Wilson moved into a new home funded by donations, in New Albany. She celebrated her 115th birthday in September 2005, and died on February 13, 2006, aged 115 years, 153 days.

=== Fred Harold Hale ===
Frederick Harold "Fred" Hale Sr. (December 1, 1890 – November 19, 2004) was born in New Sharon, Maine. He married Flora Mooers (d. 1979) in 1910, and had five children, three of which he outlived. Throughout his life, he worked as a railroad worker and a beekeeper, before retiring to pursue gardening and canning produce. At the age of 95, he surfed for the first time in Hawaii, while on his way back to the U.S. from visiting his grandson in Japan. He was recognized by Guinness World Records as the oldest driver in the world at the age of 104, and he continued driving until age 108. At 109, he moved to the Syracuse area in New York State. A lifelong fan of the Boston Red Sox, he was alive to see both their 1918 and 2004 World Series victories.

On March 5, 2004, upon the death of 114-year-old Joan Riudavets of Spain, Hale became the world's oldest living man. He died on November 19, shortly before his 114th birthday, after battling a case of pneumonia and was succeeded as the world's oldest man by Emiliano Mercado del Toro.

=== Earl Brush ===
Earl Fred Brush (July 17, 1893 – January 10, 2005) was an American supercentenarian recognized as the oldest living man in California at the time of his death. Born in Marshall, Iowa, he later farmed in Minnesota and worked on aircraft carriers in the Bay Area during World War II. He retired as an electrical inspector at 70, was married for 68 years, and lived to 111 years and 177 days.

=== George Johnson ===
George Henry Johnson (May 1, 1894 – August 30, 2006) was an American supercentenarian and military veteran who, at the time of his death, was recognized as the oldest living person in California and the state's last surviving veteran of World War I. Born in Philadelphia, Pennsylvania, Johnson claimed to be a grandson of U.S. President Andrew Johnson, alleging that his father, James, was an illegitimate child of the former president. In 1917, while working as a mail sorter for the U.S. Post Office, he was drafted into the United States Army and served in the Fourteenth Company, 154th Battalion at Fort Greene, North Carolina, and Fort Dix, New Jersey, though he did not see combat before the war ended.

Following his military discharge in 1919, Johnson married his high school sweetheart, Ida Dulany, and relocated to California. During World War II, he contributed to the home front war effort by working outfitting cargo vessels at the Kaiser Shipyards in Richmond, California. He later secured long-term employment managing the heating plant at the Oak Knoll Naval Hospital in Oakland, California, where he eventually retired. Johnson famously lived independently in the Richmond house he built by hand in 1935 out of salvaged lumber, continuing to drive an automobile until failing eyesight forced him to stop at age 102. Retrospective analysis of his lifespan by the Gerontology Research Group confirmed him as the state's sole living supercentenarian at the time of his death, though Gertrude Baines was later discovered to be older. He died of complications from pneumonia at his home at the age of 112 years and 121 days, outliving his wife of 73 years and all direct family members of his generation.

=== Henry Hartmann ===
Henry George Hartmann (July 14, 1894 – November 10, 2005) was an American supercentenarian and among the oldest living men globally. He led his family's industrial glove manufacturing plant in Chicago before retiring to Southern California in 1967. Hartmann remained active into his later years and died at age 111 years and 119 days in La Jolla, California. Hartmann's death was revealed in his body's autopsy to have been due to amyloidosis, and the GRG noted that his death occurred in spite of the fact that his vital signs were strong shortly before his death.

=== George Francis ===
George Rene Francis (June 6, 1896 – December 27, 2008) was an American supercentenarian and the joint second-oldest living man in the world, together with Englishman Henry Allingham, also born on June 6, 1896, until Francis's death aged 112 years and 204 days. He was also the oldest living man in the United States, following the death of then 111-year-old Antonio Pierro on February 8, 2007. Francis was from New Orleans, Louisiana, but after 1949 lived in Sacramento, California, where a local newspaper published a poem that Francis enjoyed reciting to friends and the public throughout his life. He credited his longevity to nature, and enjoyed a rich diet of pork, eggs, milk and lard. He gave up smoking cigars at the age of 75.

Francis attempted to join the U.S. Army in World War I, but was rejected for service in 1918 as being too short and small (he weighed only about 100 pounds [45 kg]). Despite this, he later was a boxer before becoming a barber and then a chauffeur. Less than two months before his death, he celerated the election of Barack Obama as the United States's first African-American President.

=== Gertrude Weaver ===
Gertrude "Tonpon" Weaver (née Gaines; July 4, 1898 – April 6, 2015) was an American supercentenarian who held the title of world's oldest living person for six days in 2015. She gained the title after the death of Misao Okawa on April 1, 2015, and was succeeded by Jeralean Talley upon her death on April 6, 2015. Weaver became the oldest person in the United States at 114 years old on December 17, 2012.

Gertrude Gaines was born on July 4, 1898, in Lafayette County, Arkansas to sharecroppers Charles and Ophelia Gaines. Gaines married Gennie Weaver (1898–1969), with whom she had four children, on July 18, 1915. Gertrude was outlived by her second son and third child, Joe, who died at 93 in 2018. Weaver worked as a domestic helper for her entire life.

On July 4, 2014, Weaver's 116th and final birthday, the mayor of Camden declared July 4 to be "Gertrude Day" in Weaver's honor. She died on April 6, 2015, of complications from aspiration pneumonia.

=== Garland Adair ===
Garland Adair (July 30, 1898 – December 11, 2009) was an American supercentenarian who, at the time of his death, was recognized as the oldest living man in the U.S. state of Texas. Born in Fannin County, Texas, he spent his early years working on family farmlands before pursuing commercial trades. Adair was a veteran of World War I, having served in the United States Army. Following his military discharge, he established a career as a mechanic and a storekeeper, operating his own business for several decades in East Texas.

He married his wife, Inez, with whom he shared over 60 years of marriage until her death. He reached supercentenarian status in July 2008 and was validated by both LongeviQuest and the Gerontology Research Group. Adair maintained relatively good health and lived in his own home until entering a care facility in his final years. He died in DeKalb, Texas, at the age of 111 years and 134 days.

=== Hilliard Hudson ===
Hilliard Hudson (February 23, 1899 – November 6, 2009) was an American supercentenarian who, at the time of his death, was the oldest living person in the U.S. state of Alabama and the third-oldest validated living man in the United States. Born in Crenshaw County, Alabama, Hudson spent the majority of his youth and adult life working as an agricultural sharecropper and later as an independent farmer. He was known within his community for his lifelong dedication to farming, continuing to tend to household gardens well after his 100th birthday.

Hudson was married to his wife, Maggie, for over 70 years until her death in 1996. His status as a supercentenarian was validated by international demographic research organizations, which tracked his status as one of the last remaining American men born before the turn of the 20th century. He died peacefully at a healthcare facility in Luverne, Alabama, at the age of 110 years and 256 days.

=== Bernice Madigan ===
Bernice Madigan (née Emerson; July 24, 1899 – January 3, 2015) was born in West Springfield, Massachusetts, and moved to Cheshire when she was six. In 1918, after graduating from Adams High School, she responded to government drives to recruit women into employment during WWI, and moved to Washington, D.C. After the war, she worked as a secretary for the Department of the Treasury and the Veterans Administration. She married Paul Madigan (d. 1976) in 1925; they lived in the Washington, D.C., area and then in Silver Spring, Maryland. She retired in 1942, after which she volunteered with the church and at nursing homes, playing the piano for residents. She returned to live with family in Massachusetts in 2007. She participated in Boston University School of Medicine's New England Centenarian Study, and was interviewed and filmed by the Center for Aging at the University of Chicago and the ABC World News. She is one of 100 centenarians in The Archon Genomics XPRIZE. She joined social media, with profiles on Facebook and Twitter. Madigan died in her sleep at the age of 115 years and 163 days on January 3, 2015.

=== Evelyn Kozak ===
Eva Chavka Rivka "Evelyn" Kozak (née Jacobson) (August 14, 1899 – June 11, 2013) was an American Jewish supercentenarian, born in New York City to Isaac and Kate Jacobson, who fled from the Russian Empire, and the oldest verified Jewish person in history from November 6, 2012, 12 weeks after turning 113, when she broke fellow German-born American Adelheid Kirschbaum's record of 113 years and 83 days, through until August 27, 2014, when fellow Russian-born American Goldie Steinberg (born October 30, 1900), who was the oldest living Jewish person after her death, broke her record.

Kozak died of a heart attack at a hospital in Brooklyn, New York City, early in the morning of June 11, 2013, barely around a quarter of a day before the oldest living person, 116-year-old Japanese man Jiroemon Kimura (who died 2:08 a.m. the night of June 12, which is 1:08 p.m. the afternoon of June 11 EDT).
