= Walter Breuning =

American supercentenarian (1896–2011)

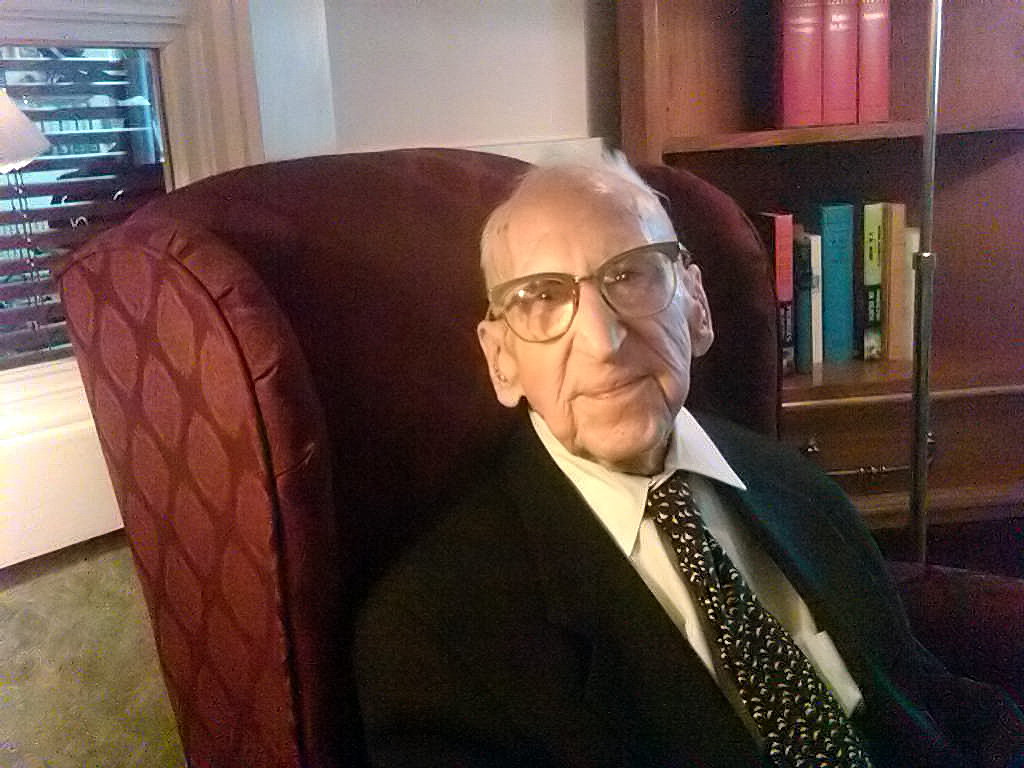
- Breuning at age 113 in 2010
- Born: September 21, 1896; Melrose, Minnesota, U.S.
- Died: April 14, 2011 (aged 114 years, 205 days); Great Falls, Montana, U.S.
- Known for: World's oldest living man (July 18, 2009 – April 14, 2011); Oldest American-born man ever
- Spouses: Agnes C. Sharpe (m. 1922; died 1957) Margaret Daniels (m. 1958; died 1975)

Walter Breuning (September 21, 1896 – April 14, 2011) was an American supercentenarian who lived for 114 years and 205 days and was, up to the time of his death, the oldest living man in the world and the third-oldest verified man ever, behind Christian Mortensen and Emiliano Mercado del Toro.

== Biography ==
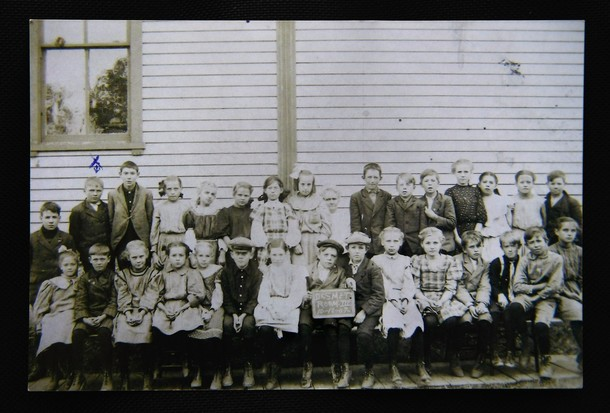
Breuning in seventh grade, second from left, top row with blue "x", October 1907

Walter Breuning was born in Melrose, Minnesota. He was the son of John and Cora (née Morehouse) Breuning, and had two brothers and two sisters. In 1901, when he was 5, his family moved to De Smet, South Dakota, where he went to school for nine years until his family broke up in 1910. Breuning referred to this time as "the dark ages", as his family lived without electricity, water, or plumbing. Apart from his parents, who died at 50 and 46, longevity runs in Breuning's family. His paternal and maternal grandparents lived into their 90s and his siblings lived to ages 78, 85, 91, and 100. His only surviving family at the time of his death were 1 niece and 3 nephews (all in their 80s), plus great-nieces and great-nephews.

In 1910, aged 14, Breuning dropped out of school and began scraping bakery pans for $2.50 weekly. He joined the Great Northern Railway in 1913. During his early years, Breuning commented that he would have to hide from owner James J. Hill, as Hill did not want any railway employees under the age of 18 (Breuning was first hired at age 17). Breuning worked for the Great Northern Railway until age 66, and was also a manager/secretary for the local Shriner's club until age 99. During World War I, he signed up for military service, but was never called up. When World War II began, he was too old to serve. He moved to Montana in 1918, where he continued working as a clerk for the Great Northern Railway. There, he met Agnes (Sharpe) Twokey, a telegraph operator from Butte. He was married to her from 1922 until her death in 1957. They had no children, and it was believed that Breuning never remarried, as he stated that "Second marriages never work; even first marriages don't work today." However, after his death, a marriage certificate was located, revealing that he married Margaret (Daniels) Vanest on October 5, 1958; she died on January 15, 1975.

Breuning was a Freemason, and a member of Great Falls Lodge No. 118, Great Falls, Montana, for over 85 years. He held the 33rd Degree of the Scottish Rite.

== In later years ==
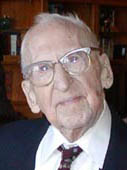
Breuning in 2009, at age 112

Breuning lived at the Rainbow Retirement and Assisted Living Center in Great Falls, Montana, for 32 years, moving in when it was The Rainbow Hotel in 1979 when he was 83. The Rainbow Hotel turned into Rainbow Assisted Living Center in 1996, the year he turned 100.

Breuning was a lifelong cigar smoker, but said in an interview at age 110 that he quit in 1999, when he was 103, saying they had become too expensive. However, aged 108, he briefly started smoking again, encouraged by gifts of cigars from as far away as London. Breuning retained a sharp memory. For example, he could remember his grandfather talking about his experiences in the American Civil War when he was three years old, and remembered the day President William McKinley was shot as the day "I got my first haircut."

On his 112th birthday in 2008, Breuning said the secret to long life is being active: "If you keep your mind busy and keep your body busy, you're going to be around a long time." On April 24, 2009, Breuning was interviewed on CBS by Steve Hartman for Assignment America. When Hartman asked if he would do a second CBS interview in four years, Breuning said, "well hell you sure can!" However, he died two years later.

== Public events ==
On his 110th birthday, in September 21 2006, Breuning was declared the oldest living retired railroader in the United States.

On February 16, 2009, Breuning made an appearance on the News Hour with Jim Lehrer, when he was 112. He recalled The Great Depression of 1929 and how his favorite president was Franklin D. Roosevelt.

On April 24, 2009, Breuning was the focus of a segment done by Steve Hartman's "Assignment America" on the CBS Evening News. and on September 21, 2009, his 113th birthday, he was the focus of another such segment. During his 113th birthday celebrations, Breuning said: "Remember that life's length is not measured by its hours and days, but by that which we have done therein. A useful life is short if it lasts a century. There are greater and better things in us all, if we would find them out. There will always be in this world—wrongs. No wrong is really successful. The day will come when light and truth and the just and the good shall be victorious and wrong as evil will be no more forever."

The BNSF Railway named the west end of its new Broadview Subdivision, where it meets the ex-Great Northern Laurel Subdivision near Broadview, Montana, Walter Junction after Breuning. He was present at the dedication of the new line, which serves the Signal Peak Mine, on September 2, 2009.

On February 25, 2010, Breuning was honored by Montana Ambassadors for shining a spotlight on the state of Montana.

== Health history and habits ==
In 1960, age 64, Breuning was diagnosed with colon cancer. It was successfully treated and the cancer did not return. Breuning did not have any other health issues until he broke his hip at the age of 108. He spent eight days in the hospital and was totally healed in 21 days. In November 2007, aged 111, Breuning was fitted with hearing aids. The week before his 113th birthday, in September 2009, Breuning fell and bruised his scalp, but was otherwise unhurt. Breuning was in excellent health, walking unaided and refusing to use the elevator to reach his second floor apartment until he broke his hip. Breuning began to slow down physically in his last year, requiring first a walker and then a motor scooter to get around, although his mental state was undiminished to the end.

Breuning attributed much of his longevity to his diet. Shortly after his wife died, Breuning started eating out at restaurants. Eventually, he stopped eating out, but continued eating two meals a day. He ate a big breakfast and a hearty lunch but skipped an evening meal, snacking on fruit instead. Breuning drank much water through the day plus a cup-and-a-half of coffee with breakfast and one cup with lunch. He got up every day at 6:15 am and had breakfast at 7:30 am. He then took a stroll around The Rainbow for exercise and could then be found sitting in the lobby chatting with fellow residents and his many visitors. Breuning would retire to his room in mid-afternoon to listen to radio and when his vision allowed him, read the newspaper and his many letters received from people from all over the world.

Overall, Breuning was in good health almost all of his life. His weight was around the same for the last 50 years of his life, 125–130 pounds (57–59 kg). Because Breuning was 5 feet 8 inches (1.73 m), his body mass index was around 19. For years Breuning took a baby aspirin every day, but he eventually gave that up, stating that he did not need it; from there on he took no medication. He performed daily calisthenics almost to the end. In his final years he could not read well because his eyesight was badly impaired by cataracts, but he kept himself occupied mentally by listening to the radio.

== Death ==
In an interview with the Associated Press in autumn 2010, Breuning stated that he had no fear or rejection of change—especially death. "We're all going to die. Some people are scared of dying. Never be afraid to die. Because you're born to die," he said.

On March 31, 2011, Breuning was hospitalized in Great Falls for an unspecified illness. Then-Governor of Montana Brian Schweitzer visited him in the hospital on April 6 and 8, 2011. He died peacefully in his sleep of natural causes at 3:30 pm local time on April 14, 2011.

At the time of his death, Breuning was the third-oldest living person in the world as well as the second-oldest living American, behind Besse Cooper, and the oldest living man. He was succeeded as the world's oldest living man by fellow 114-year old Horacio Celi Mendoza of Peru.

Before he died, Breuning shared a prayer with his pastor. He said "Talked to Him this morning. Reminded Him of our agreement." His pastor asked what the agreement was. Breuning said, "If I'm not going to get better, I'm supposed to go now."

== See also ==
- List of American supercentenarians
- List of the verified oldest people
