= Jean-Marie Robine =

French demographer, gerontologist and author (born 1951)

- Born: 1951 (age 74–75); France
- Occupations: Demographer; gerontologist; author; journalist
- Known for: Publications (books and journals) on health and longevity; work with Max Planck Institute for Demographic Research; Verifying longevity claims

Jean-Marie Robine (born 1951) is a French social scientist, who works in the field of demography and gerontology, and is an author and journalist, who is best known as being the co-validator (with Dr. Michael Allard) of the longevity of Jeanne Calment, the oldest verified supercentenarian of all time, with whom he collaborated.

Robine has been instrumental in organizing international efforts to study supercentenarians, through workshops held at the Max Planck Institute for Demographic Research and by founding the International Database on Longevity. Robine currently has the largest European supercentenarian dataset, and also collaborates with Japanese demographer Yasuhiko Saito.

== Publications ==
- Jeanne Calment: From Van Gogh's Time to Ours : 122 Extraordinary Years by Michel Allard, Victor Lebre, Jean-Marie Robine and Jeanne Calment (Hardcover - Oct 1998)
- Longevity and Frailty (Research and Perspectives in Longevity) by J.R. Carey, Jean-Marie Robine, J.-P. Michel and Yves Christen (Hardcover - Jun 22, 2005)
- Determining Health Expectancies by Jean-Marie Robine, Carol Jagger, Colin D. Mathers and Eileen M. Crimmins (Hardcover - Jan 17, 2003)
- Brain and Longevity by Caleb E. Finch, Jean-Marie Robine and Yves Christen (Hardcover - Jan 31, 2003)
- Human Longevity, Individual Life Duration, and the Growth of the Oldest-Old Population (International Studies in Population) by Jean-Marie Robine, Eileen M. Crimmins, Shiro Horiuchi and Yi Zeng (Paperback - Sep 2007)
- Sex and Longevity: Sexuality, Gender, Reproduction, Parenthood (Research and Perspectives in Longevity) by Jean-Marie Robine, Thomas B. L. (Tom) Kirkwood and Michel Allard (Hardcover - Dec 2000)
- Longer Life and Healthy Aging (International Studies in Population) by Yi Zeng, Eileen M. Crimmins, Yves Carrière and Jean-Marie Robine (Paperback - Feb 2007)
- The Paradoxes of Longevity (Research and Perspectives in Longevity) by Jean-Marie Robine, Bernard Forette, Claudio Franceschi and Michel Allard (Hardcover - Aug 1999)

== Selected journal articles ==
- Survival beyond Age 100: The Case of Japan by Jean-Marie Robine and Yasuhiko Saito
- Population and Development Review, Vol. 29, Supplement: Life Span: Evolutionary, Ecological, and Demographic Perspectives (2003), pp. 208–228

== See also ==
- Longevity
- Oldest people
- List of the verified oldest people
