= Nabi Tajima =

Japanese supercentenarian (1900–2018)

- 田島 ナビ
- Born: 4 August 1900; Wan Village, Kagoshima Prefecture, Japan (now Kikai, Kagoshima Prefecture, Japan)
- Died: 21 April 2018 (aged 117 years, 260 days); Kikai, Kagoshima Prefecture, Japan
- Known for: Oldest verified living person (16 September 2017 – 21 April 2018); Last living person born in the 19th century; Fifth oldest validated person ever

Nabi Tajima (田島 ナビ, Tajima Nabi; 4 August 1900 – 21 April 2018) was a Japanese supercentenarian who was the world's oldest living person from 16 September 2017 until her death, and the last surviving person to have been born in the 19th century.

== Personal life ==
Tajima was born in Araki, an area which was then Wan Village, in the westernmost part of Kikaijima Island. From February 2002 until her death, she resided in a nursing home named "Kikaien" (喜界園) in Kikai, Kagoshima.

Her husband, Tominishi Tajima (田島 富二子), died in 1991 at the age of 95 according to some sources, or possibly 1992 or 1993 according to others. She had nine children (seven sons and two daughters). In September 2017 she had 164 descendants, consisting of 28 grandchildren, 58 great-grandchildren, 64 great-great-grandchildren and 14 great-great-great-grandchildren.

== Longevity ==
Tajima became the oldest living person in Japan on 27 September 2015, upon the death of a 115-year-old woman, whose family requested her name be withheld, who was living in Tokyo.

Two years later, Violet Brown died on 15 September 2017 in Jamaica (UTC-5). In Japan, where Tajima lived, the date was already 16 September 2017 (JST), and Tajima became the oldest living person in the world, along with being the last surviving person who was known to have been born in the 19th century.

On 1 October 2017 she surpassed the final age of Misao Okawa, 117 years, 27 days, becoming the oldest Japanese ever and on 23 March 2018 she surpassed the final age of Marie-Louise Meilleur, 117 years, 230 days becoming the 3rd oldest person ever after Jeanne Calment and Sarah Knauss. She held these distinctions until she was surpassed by Kane Tanaka on 19 September 2020. She is currently the 2nd oldest Japanese ever and the 5th oldest person ever.

Tajima stated that her longevity was due to sleeping soundly and eating delicious food.

== Death ==
Tajima died on 21 April 2018 in Kikai, Kagoshima Prefecture at the age of 117 years, 260 days. After Tajima's death, Chiyo Miyako in Yokohama, Japan, became the world's oldest living person. Her death was reported by international media. ABC News described her as a great-great-great-grandmother and noted that Guinness World Records had planned to recognize her as the world's oldest person. CBS News included footage of Tajima moving her hands to the beat of traditional Japanese music during a ceremony celebrating her longevity.

== See also ==
- Oldest people
- List of Japanese supercentenarians
- List of the verified oldest people
