= Violet Brown =

Jamaican supercentenarian (1900–2017)

- Brown in 2015, with a birthday card from Elizabeth II
- Born: Violet Mosse; 10 March 1900; Duanvale, Trelawny, British Jamaica
- Died: 15 September 2017 (aged 117 years, 189 days); Montego Bay, Saint James Parish, Jamaica
- Resting place: Duanvale Cemetery
- Other names: Violete Brown, Violet Mosse-Brown, Violet Moss
- Known for: Oldest living person (15 April 2017 – 15 September 2017); Oldest Jamaican ever
- Spouse: Augustus Gaynor Brown (died 1978)
- Children: 6

Violet Brown (née Mosse; 10 March 1900 – 15 September 2017) was a Jamaican supercentenarian who was the oldest verified living person in the world for five months, following the death of Emma Morano on 15 April 2017 until her own death at the age of 117 years, 189 days on 15 September 2017. She was, along with Japanese woman Nabi Tajima, one of the last two living people known to have been born in the 19th century. She is the oldest verified Jamaican person in history.

== Early life ==
Brown was born as Violet Mosse on 10 March 1900, and was one of four children born in Duanvale, Trelawny, British Jamaica, to John Mosse, who was a sugar boiler, and Elizabeth Riley. She was baptized at the age of 13 into the Baptist Church.

== Longevity ==
Brown indicated in an April 2017 interview with The Jamaica Observer that she was healthier than her five remaining children and had no ailments.

When asked about the reasons for her longevity, Brown claimed there was no secret formula to her long life, telling the Jamaica Gleaner: "Really and truly, when people ask what I eat and drink to live so long, I say to them that I eat everything, except pork and chicken, and I don't drink rum and dem tings." She also credited her longevity to eating three eggs a day, two of them raw.

She is the oldest verified Jamaican person ever and the first verified supercentenarian from Jamaica. Her date of birth was variously reported as 4 March 1900, 10 March 1900 and 15 March 1900.

Brown was born in Jamaica when it was a part of the British Empire and she was the last known subject of Queen Victoria.

== Personal life ==
Brown married Augustus Gaynor Brown, with whom she had one daughter. She had six children in total, four of whom were still living at the time of her death in 2017. Her first child, Harland Fairweather, died on 19 April 2017, aged 97 years and 4 days. He is believed to have been the oldest person with a living parent.

== Death ==
Brown died on 15 September 2017 at a hospital in Montego Bay, Saint James Parish, at the age of 117, after being diagnosed with dehydration and irregular heartbeat a week prior. Following her death, Nabi Tajima became the oldest living person and the last living person born in the 19th century.

== See also ==
- List of the oldest people by country
- List of the verified oldest people
- Oldest people
