= Edna Parker =

American supercentenarian (1893–2008)

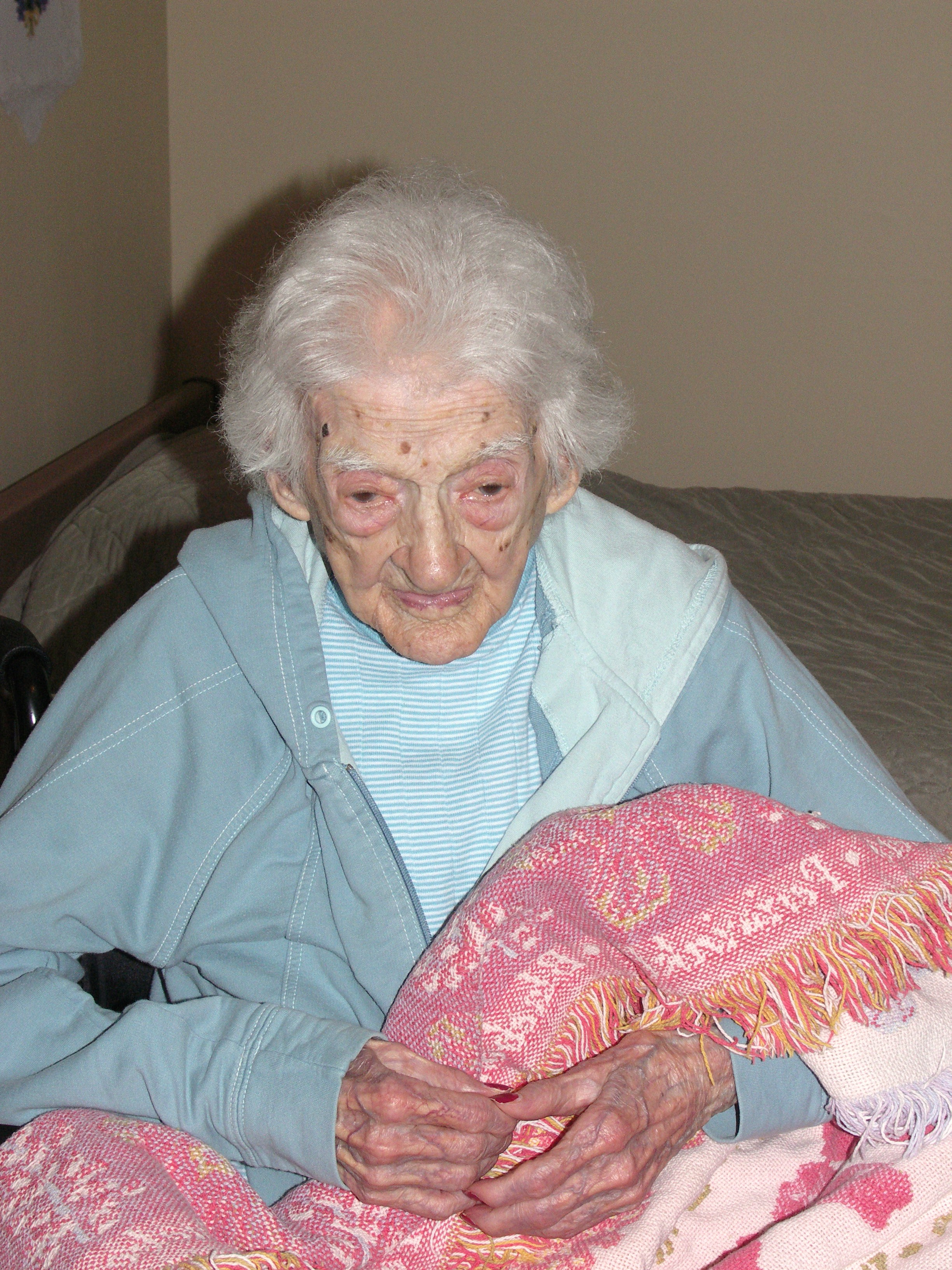
- Parker in 2007 at age 114
- Born: Edna Ruth Scott; April 20, 1893; Morgan County, Indiana, U.S.
- Died: November 26, 2008 (aged 115 years, 220 days); Shelbyville, Indiana, U.S.
- Resting place: Shelbyville's Miller Cemetery
- Education: Franklin College
- Known for: The oldest living person from August 13, 2007, to November 26, 2008
- Spouse: Earl Parker (m. 1913; died 1939)
- Children: 2

Signature
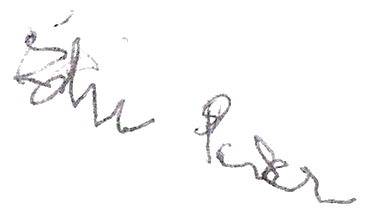

Edna Ruth Parker (née Scott; April 20, 1893 – November 26, 2008) was an American supercentenarian who, for 15 months, was recognized as the oldest person in the world. She was featured in two documentaries and included in a Boston University DNA database of supercentenarians.

== Biography ==
Edna Ruth Scott was born on April 20, 1893, on a farm in Morgan County, Indiana, and raised eating a typical farm diet of meat and starch. She attended Franklin Senior High School, then took classes at Franklin College to obtain a teaching certificate. Parker taught at a two-room schoolhouse in Smithland for a few years, until she married her next door neighbor, Earl Parker, on April 12, 1913. Earl died on February 23, 1939, aged 54, from a heart attack. They had two sons, Clifford and Earl Jr., both of whom she outlived. Her two sisters predeceased her, one dying aged 99 and the other at 88. At the time of her death, Parker had five grandchildren, thirteen great-grandchildren and thirteen great-great-grandchildren.

Parker lived alone on a farm from the age of 45, when her husband died, until 1993, aged 100 when, still in very strong health, she lived briefly with her son Clifford, before moving to a nursing home at Heritage House Convalescent Center, a retirement community in Shelbyville, Indiana. Until her death, Parker read the newspaper every day and enjoyed reading and reciting poetry, especially the works of James Whitcomb Riley, and according to family liked to quote his poetry to visitors.

=== Final years ===
While Parker's 100th birthday was celebrated by her family and recognized in the local newspaper, by the time she reached 109, the occasion was noted state-wide. On her 111th birthday in 2004, she received accolades from both the state governor and the president. The Boston University New England Centenarian Study took a sample of Parker's DNA in 2006, as part of a study of the genetics of extreme longevity. In January 2007, Parker became the oldest person in the United States, and seven months later, following the death of Yone Minagawa of Japan on August 13, 2007, she became the oldest person in the world. The occasion is recorded as a "Moment of Indiana History". Parker featured in an episode of Mark Dolan's documentary The World's ... and Me in 2008, and in another documentary called How to Live Forever, released in 2009. On her 114th birthday, she received a letter from Vice President Dick Cheney, who thanked her for "sharing her wisdom and experiences" with younger generations, received the key to the city of Shelbyville from the Mayor, and was visited by the state Governor and Senator. On April 21, 2007, she met with Bertha Fry of Muncie, who was 113 at the time, which set the highest combined age (227 years 142 days) for a meeting of two supercentenarians; both were awarded certificates in person by a representative of Guinness World Records. Parker lived in the same nursing home as Sandy Allen, the tallest living woman verified by Guinness World Records, until Allen's death on August 13, 2008. Parker reportedly did not offer an explanation for her long life, and simply advised questioners that the most important thing was "more education".

The Heritage House Convalescent Center planned two parties to celebrate her 115th birthday, a public celebration and a private family party. One hundred and fifteen multicolored balloons were released at each, because Parker enjoyed watching them float into the sky. Parker was included in a book for children, Girls are Best (2009), as the oldest woman in the world. She died at her nursing home seven months after her birthday, on November 26, 2008, aged 115 years 220 days. Her death was reported around the world. Parker is buried in Shelbyville's Miller Cemetery. After her death, a Portuguese woman Maria de Jesus became the world's oldest person.

== See also ==
- List of the verified oldest people
- 100 oldest American people ever
