= Edith Ceccarelli =

American supercentenarian (1908–2024)

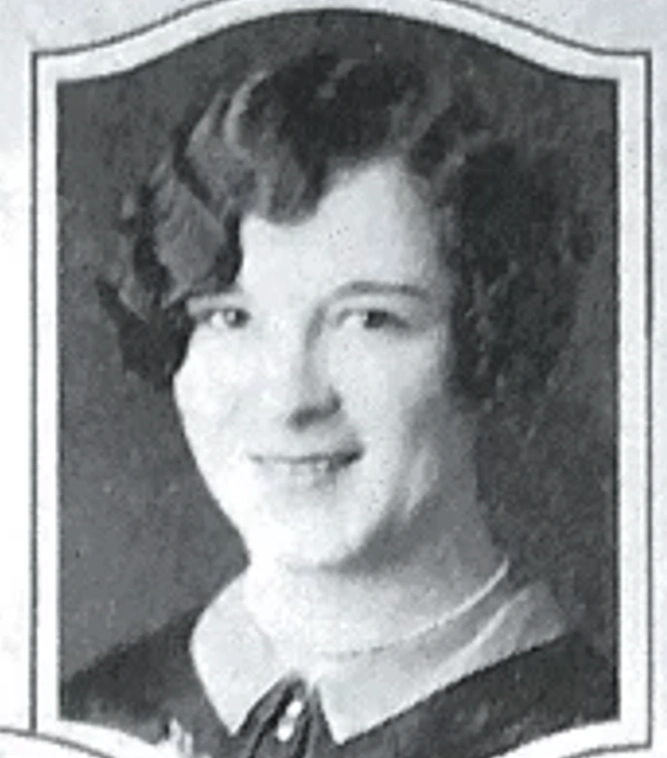
- Ceccarelli's graduation photo in 1927
- Born: Edith Rose Recagno; February 5, 1908; Willits, California, U.S.
- Died: February 22, 2024 (aged 116 years, 17 days); Willits, California, U.S.
- Spouses: Elmer Keenan (m. 1933; died 1984) Charles Ceccarelli (m. 1986; died 1990)
- Children: 1 (deceased)

Edith Rose Ceccarelli (née Recagno, formerly Keenan; February 5, 1908 – February 22, 2024) was an American supercentenarian. At the age of 116 years and 17 days, she was the oldest person living in the United States and was also the second oldest living person in the world after Maria Branyas Morera from Spain.

== Biography ==
Born in Willits, California, on February 5, 1908, Ceccarelli was the eldest of the seven children of Italian immigrants Agostino (1874–1965) and Maria Recagno (1881–1973), who both lived into their 90s. Her father was a lumber worker who also sold groceries by horse and buggy before opening a store in Willits in 1916. She graduated from Willits Union High School in 1927.

Ceccarelli danced regularly well into old age, and lived independently until she turned 107 and moved into a retirement home. She suffered from dementia, but was able to walk with a walker until she was 114. Each year, her birthday was celebrated officially by the town of Willits, the final being a drive-by parade to mark her 116th birthday in 2024.

== Personal life and death ==
In 1933, she married Elmer Keenan, whom she had met in high school, and moved with him to Santa Rosa, California, where he worked as a typesetter for The Press Democrat. They adopted a daughter, Laureen, who died in 2003, and returned to Willits in 1971. After being widowed in 1984, she married Charles Ceccarelli in 1986 and was widowed for a second time in 1990.

Ceccarelli outlived her six younger siblings, two husbands, her daughter, and three grandchildren. She became the oldest living person in the United States when Iowan Bessie Hendricks died in January 2023.

Edith Ceccarelli died on February 22, 2024, at the age of 116. At the time of her death, she was the oldest living American and second oldest living person in the world after Maria Branyas Morera (March 4, 1907 – August 19, 2024). Upon Ceccarelli's death, Elizabeth Francis became the oldest living person in the United States.
