= Jeralean Talley =

American supercentenarian (1899–2015)

- Talley just prior to her 116th birthday in 2015
- Born: Jeralean Kurtz; May 23, 1899; Montrose, Georgia, U.S.
- Died: June 17, 2015 (aged 116 years, 25 days); Inkster, Michigan, U.S.
- Known for: Oldest living person (April 6, 2015 - June 17, 2015)
- Spouse: Alfred Talley (m. 1936; died 1988)
- Children: 1

Jeralean Talley (née Kurtz; May 23, 1899 – June 17, 2015) was an American supercentenarian who was, aged 116 years, 25 days, the world's verified oldest living person. She was previously thought to be the oldest living American, from the death of Elsie Thompson on March 21, 2013, until Gertrude Weaver was verified to be older in July 2014. Upon Weaver's death on April 6, 2015, Talley was recognised as the oldest living person in the world. Talley received letters from U.S. President Barack Obama on her 114th and 116th birthdays acknowledging her status.

== Biography ==
Talley was born on May 23, 1899, in Montrose, Georgia. One of 12 children, she spent her early years living on a farm picking cotton and peanuts and harvesting sweet potatoes. She moved to Inkster, Michigan in 1935, and lived there until she died. In 1936, she married Alfred Talley (January 30, 1893 – October 17, 1988). Jeralean and Alfred were married for 52 years until his death. They had one child, a daughter, born in 1937. Talley had three grandchildren, ten great-grandchildren, and four great-great-grandchildren.

=== Health and lifestyle ===
According to her daughter Thelma, Jeralean stayed active in her later life by sewing dresses, making quilts and playing slot machines at casinos. She bowled until she was 104, when her legs got too weak, but still went on annual fishing trips with her friend Michael Kinloch and his son Tyler, who was also her godson.

Talley was a member of the New Jerusalem Missionary Baptist Church, whose members referred to her as "Mother Talley". In May 2013, they celebrated her 114th birthday by officially naming the church's driveway after her. Talley also received a personalized letter from U.S. President Barack Obama, who wrote that she was "part of an extraordinary generation". On her 116th birthday, Talley received another letter from Obama who wrote that the "breadth of her experience and depth of her wisdom reflects the long path our nation has traveled since 1899".

She said she lived by the Golden Rule. She was known in the community for her wisdom and wit, and when people sought her advice she told them to use common sense, saying "I don't have much education but what little sense I got, I try to use it".

=== Death ===
On June 17, 2015, Talley died after a week of hospitalization. She had prayed not to suffer before death, and reportedly died peacefully during her sleep at her home in Inkster. Regarding her great age, she had been quoted as saying "There's nothing I can do about it." Following her death, Susannah Mushatt Jones became the oldest person in the world.

== See also ==
- List of the verified oldest people
