= Emma Tillman =

American supercentenarian (1892–2007)

- Tillman aged 114 with great-granddaughter Carol Stewart
- Born: November 22, 1892; Gibsonville, North Carolina, U.S.
- Died: January 28, 2007 (aged 114 years, 67 days); East Hartford, Connecticut, U.S.
- Occupations: Baker, caterer
- Known for: World's oldest person (January 24, 2007 – January 28, 2007)
- Spouse: Arthur Tillman (m. 1914; died 1939)

Emmaline Fanchon Tillman, (née Faust; November 22, 1892 – January 28, 2007) was an American supercentenarian and, for a few days, the world's oldest living person until she died aged 114 years and 67 days.

== Biography ==
Tillman was one of 23 children born to former slaves Alphonso Faust and Martha Gibson Faust in Gibsonville, North Carolina. Her maiden name, Faust, had been adopted from the plantation owner who owned her father's family before the American Civil War, Cane Faust. The family moved to Glastonbury, Connecticut in 1900, where Tillman became the only African-American attending Glastonbury High School, graduating in 1909 as the first African-American to do so there. Although she enjoyed studying commercial arithmetic, and did the accounts on her father's tobacco farm, she moved to Hartford in 1914, to take up a position as a housekeeper, the only paid employment open to her at that time. She married Arthur Tillman the same year, and they had two daughters. Tillman ran her own baking and catering service for about sixty years, sometimes serving meals for visiting state dignitaries such as Governors Raymond E. Baldwin and Ella T. Grasso, and whose regular customers included Dr. Thomas Hepburn, a noted Hartford Hospital urologist and father to actress Katharine Hepburn, who she served as the family cook for a number of years. Her husband died in 1939. Four of her siblings lived past age 100, including a brother who lived to be 108, a sister who reached 105 and two others who reached 102.

Throughout her lifetime, Tillman was involved in various NAACP social programs and the National Council of Negro Women.

The day before her 110th birthday, former Connecticut Governor John G. Rowland proclaimed that her birthday, November 22, would be known within the state as "Emma Tillman Day".

Tillman was a parishioner at the Metropolitan A.M.E. Zion Church for more than 80 years, where she became informally known as the "mother" of the church and the A.M.E. Conference as a whole. She was a member of the church choir for more than seventy years, and president of the senior for fifteen years.

She lived independently until the age of 110. On January 18, 2007, she became the oldest living woman following the death of 115-year-old Canadian Julie Winnefred Bertrand, and on January 24, 2007, she became the world's oldest living person with the death of 115-year-old Emiliano Mercado del Toro (a native of Puerto Rico).

She died in an East Hartford nursing home on January 28, 2007, aged 114 years, 67 days. She holds the record for the shortest period spent as the world's oldest person. After her death, Yone Minagawa of Japan became the world's oldest person.

On March 9, 2007, Tillman was discussed as a major subject of a lecture by Felicia Nimue Ackerman, a professor of philosophy at Brown University, titled "Nature vs. the Tragedy of Emma Faust Tillman's Death", at the Karbank Symposium in Environmental Philosophy at Boston University. The lecture discussed issues related to environmental philosophy, particularly the value of individual human lives compared to the value of natural environments and their preservation.

== See also ==
- Ageing
- Maximum life span
- Senescence
- 100 oldest American people ever
