= Elizabeth Bolden =

American supercentenarian (1890–2006)

- Bolden in 2005, seen with her grandson, John Louis "Jack" Bolden (1928–2010), then aged 77
- Born: Elizabeth Jones; August 16, 1890; Somerville, Tennessee, U.S.
- Died: December 11, 2006 (aged 116 years, 117 days); Memphis, Tennessee, U.S.
- Other names: Elizabeth Bolden, Lizzie
- Known for: World's oldest living person (August 27, 2006, to December 11, 2006)
- Spouse: Lewis Bolden (m. 1908; died 1955)
- Children: 6 (all deceased)
- Relatives: John Louis "Jack" Bolden (1928–2010) (grandson); James Emil William "Jimmy" Bolden, Jr. (1930–1998) (grandson)

Elizabeth Bolden (née Jones; August 16, 1890 – December 11, 2006) was an American supercentenarian who, at the time of her death at age 116 years, 118 days, was recognized by Guinness World Records as the world's oldest living person.

== Biography ==
Elizabeth Jones was born in 1890 in Somerville, Tennessee to formerly enslaved parents.

She married Louis Bolden (1892 – 1955) in 1908 when she was eighteen and he was sixteen, and their first child, a son, James Ezell Bolden, Sr. (23 September 1910 – 18 September 1986) was born two years later when she was twenty and he was eighteen. Elizabeth and Louis Bolden had three sons and four daughters and raised cotton and subsistence crops on farmland near Memphis until the 1950s.

Bolden outlived another son, John Wesley "Wes" Bolden (16 December 1915 – 8 October 1983), who died at the age of 68, two daughters, Ethel Bell Riddick (1912 – 13 September 1935), who died at 23 and Annie Pearl Trice (21 June 1925 – 15 April 2001) who lived to the age of 75, as well as a grandson, James Emil William Bolden, Jr. (8 August 1930 – 3 October 1998), the second-born of her late eldest son, Ezell, who was 68 years old at the time of his death.

Only two daughters were living at the time of Bolden's death in 2006, Queen Esther Rhodes (born 1918), who died in 2008 at age 90 and Mamie Brittmon (born 1920), who died aged 102 in 2022. At the time of her 116th birthday in August 2006, Bolden also had 40 grandchildren, 75 great-grandchildren, 150 great-great-grandchildren, 220 great-great-great-grandchildren and 75 great-great-great-great-grandchildren.

== Later life ==
In her final years, Bolden resided in a Memphis nursing home that she had lived in since she was 109, and was described by her family as unable to communicate. They requested that media attention (such as interviews and visits) be limited. While she was the world's oldest person, Bolden was rarely seen in public.

She was photographed for two different books in early 2005, and was featured in Jet magazine in May 2005 and the Memphis Commercial Appeal in June 2005. For her 116th birthday, new photographs were released for the first time in almost a year, and her family said that she was looking forward to her birthday.

== Age records ==
Elizabeth Bolden was verified in April 2005 as being the oldest documented resident of the United States since the death of Emma Verona Johnston the previous December. Prior to this, Bettie Wilson, had been the oldest known American. After the death of Hendrikje van Andel on August 30, 2005, she was thought to be the world's oldest living person until December 9, 2005, when María Capovilla was authenticated as older. She became the oldest living person following Capovilla's death on August 27, 2006. This was officially confirmed on September 17, 2006, by Guinness World Records.

After her death, Emiliano Mercado del Toro became the world's oldest person.

== See also ==
- 100 oldest American people ever
