= John Tinniswood =

English supercentenarian (1912–2024)

- Tinniswood in 2022
- Born: John Alfred Tinniswood; 26 August 1912; Liverpool, Lancashire, England
- Died: 25 November 2024 (aged 112 years, 91 days); Southport, Lancashire, England
- Occupation: Accountant
- Known for: World's oldest living man (29 June – 25 November 2024)
- Spouse: Blodwen Roberts (m. 1942; died 1986)
- Children: 1

John Alfred Tinniswood (26 August 1912 – 25 November 2024) was a British supercentenarian who was the world's oldest verified living man from the death of 112-year-old Shi Ping of China on 29 June 2024 until his own death on 25 November 2024, at the age of 112 years and 91 days.

== Biography ==
John Alfred Tinniswood was born on 26 August 1912 in Liverpool, Lancashire, England. He was the son of John Bernard Tinniswood (1869–1947) and Ada Tinniswood (née Pimblett; 1875–1957). During World War II, he enlisted in the British Army. Due to his poor eyesight, he was barred from serving as a front line soldier and instead held an administrative role within the Royal Army Pay Corps as an accountant and auditor. He was also involved in logistical tasks, such as locating stranded soldiers and organising food supplies. Tinniswood met his future wife, Blodwen (née Roberts, 1917–1986), at a dance during the war; they married in 1942, and their only child, Susan, was born in 1943. Tinniswood went on to work as an accountant for Royal Mail and Shell-Mex and BP before retiring in 1972. Blodwen died from lung cancer in 1986, after 44 years of marriage.

=== Later life ===
In retirement, Tinniswood became active in his church, Blundellsands United Reformed Church, where he was an elder and also gave sermons. Aged 99, he moved to a care home in Southport, Merseyside. His 110th birthday in August 2022 was accompanied by a live music performance at his residence, and he also received a clock paying tribute to Liverpool F.C., of which Tinniswood was an avid fan. At the time of his death, he had four grandchildren and three great-grandchildren.

== Health and longevity ==
Tinniswood became the oldest living British man on 25 September 2020, upon the death of 108-year-old Harry Fransman. In interviews given on his 109th and 111th birthdays, he stated that the key to his longevity was "moderation". Upon being recognised by Guinness World Records for being the world's oldest living man, he stated that his longevity was "pure luck" and that "You either live long or you live short, and you can't do much about it".

On 2 April 2024, upon the death of 114-year-old Juan Vicente Pérez of Venezuela, Tinniswood was declared the oldest living man in the world and received recognition from Guinness World Records two days later. However, Chinese man Shi Ping and Frenchman Georges Thomas, both born in November 1911, were older and were yet to be verified by researchers. Tinniswood became the oldest European man on 1 June 2024, upon the death of Thomas, and on 29 June, following Shi's death, became the world's oldest man.

Owing to his administrative and logistical role during the Second World War, he was also said to be "the world's oldest surviving male World War II veteran", upon being recognised by Guinness.

Tinniswood died in Southport on 25 November 2024 at the age of 112 years and 91 days. Following his death, 112-year-old João Marinho Neto became the world's oldest living man.

== See also ==
- List of British supercentenarians
- List of the verified oldest people
