= Marie-Louise Meilleur =

Canadian supercentenarian (1880–1998)

- Meilleur in 1998, shortly before her death
- Born: Marie-Louise Fébronie Chassé; August 29, 1880; Kamouraska, Quebec, Canada
- Died: April 16, 1998 (aged 117 years, 230 days); Corbeil, Ontario, Canada
- Known for: Oldest validated Canadian ever Oldest living person (August 4, 1997 – April 16, 1998)
- Spouses: Étienne Leclerc (m. 1900; died 1911) Hector Meilleur (m. 1915; died 1972)
- Children: 12

Marie-Louise Fébronie Meilleur (French pronunciation: [maʁi lwiz febʁɔni mɛjœʁ]; née Chassé; August 29, 1880 – April 16, 1998) was a Canadian supercentenarian. She is the oldest validated Canadian ever and upon the death of longevity world record holder Jeanne Calment, became the world's oldest recognized living person.

== Early life ==
Marie-Louise Fébronie Chassé was born on August 29, 1880, in Kamouraska, Quebec, to Pierre Charles Pitre Chassé and Marie-Catherine Fébronie Lévesque.

She married her first husband, Étienne Leclerc, at age 20 in 1900. Leclerc was a fisherman and died of pneumonia on February 24, 1911, aged 39. They had six children; four survived to adulthood.

In the following twelve months, both of her parents died: her father on June 25, 1911, aged 61; and her mother on February 23, 1912, aged 59.

=== Move to Ontario ===
In 1913, Marie-Louise placed two of her four surviving children with family or friends, and moved to the Ontario border to help support her sister, whose children were sick with diphtheria. There she married her second husband, Hector Meilleur, on October 25, 1915. They had six children together.

== Return to Kamouraska and later life ==
Meilleur did not return to the Quebec region until 1939, when she settled again in Kamouraska. Her second husband Hector Meilleur died in 1972 at age 93, of diabetes.

From that time Meilleur lived with one of her daughters for a period. When she needed more care, she moved to a nursing home in Corbeil. Of the twelve children born to her, four survived her. She had 85 grandchildren, 80 great-grandchildren, 57 great-great-grandchildren, and four great-great-great-grandchildren.

Meilleur quit smoking at age 102 in 1982, after catching a cold. In 1986, when asked the secret to long life, she claimed it was hard work. Meilleur was a vegetarian. She became the world's oldest living person on August 4, 1997, after the death of 122-year-old Frenchwoman Jeanne Calment. By her 117th birthday, she was too weak to talk, and could hear only if someone shouted directly into her right ear.

== Death ==
Marie-Louise Meilleur died of a thrombus at age 117 on April 16, 1998, in Corbeil. One of her sons was living in the same nursing home, and her oldest living daughter, Gabrielle Vaughan, was 90. Vaughan died in 2004 at age 96. Meilleur was buried alongside her second husband in Swisha, where she had previously lived.

American Sarah Knauss (1880–1999) succeeded her as the oldest living person.

== See also ==
- Aging
- List of the verified oldest people
