= Hermitage Springs, Tennessee =

Unincorporated community in Clay County, Tennessee, United States

Hermitage Springs
- Unincorporated community
- Location within Tennessee Location within the United States
- Coordinates: 36°34′51.2″N 85°46′52.92″W
- Country: United States
- State: Tennessee
- County: Clay
- Elevation: 751 ft (229 m)
- Time zone: UTC-6 (Central (CST))
  - Summer (DST): UTC-5 (CDT)
- ZIP code: 37150
- Area code: 931
- GNIS feature ID: 1287491

Hermitage Springs is an unincorporated community in Clay County, Tennessee, in the United States.

== History ==
The community was originally known as Trace, for its location in the Big Trace Creek Valley when the community was established in 1840. It was originally part of Jackson County until the 1870 formation of Clay County. The town was renamed as Spivey in 1889. The town's current name was adopted in the early 1900s when the area became a summer resort town.

== Geography ==
Hermitage Springs is located just east of Clay County's western boundary with Macon County. The community is located along Tennessee State Route 52 about 15.5 miles (24.9 km) west of Celina and about 5.1 miles (8.2 km) east-northeast of Red Boiling Springs. The community also lies 4 miles (6.4 km) south of the Kentucky state line.

== Education ==
Students in the community attend Clay County Schools, including Clay County High School in Celina. The community is home to the Hermitage Springs Elementary School, which has housed kindergarten through 8th grades since 2007; the school building was previously a high school, housing all grades when the school, then known as Spivey School, was established as part of the county school system in 1919.

== Post office ==
Postal services in Hermitage Springs are conducted by the Red Boiling Springs post office by default, with ZIP code 37150.
