= Besse Cooper =

American supercentenarian (1896–2012)

- Cooper in 2011
- Born: Besse Berry Brown; August 26, 1896; Sullivan County, Tennessee, U.S.
- Died: December 4, 2012 (aged 116 years, 100 days); Monroe, Georgia, U.S.
- Education: East Tennessee State Normal School (graduated 1916)
- Known for: Oldest living person from June 21, 2011 to December 4, 2012
- Spouse: Luther Cooper (m. 1924; died 1963)
- Children: 4

Besse Berry Cooper (née Brown; August 26, 1896 – December 4, 2012) was an American supercentenarian who was the world's oldest living person from June 21, 2011 until her death in 2012.

== Early life, education and career ==
Cooper was born Besse Berry Brown in Sullivan County, Tennessee, on August 26, 1896, the third of eight children born to Richard Brown (1861–1932) and Angeline Berry (1866–1927). As a child, she did well in school and was an avid reader. She graduated from East Tennessee State Normal School (now East Tennessee State University) in 1916. It was during this period she became a suffragist, and was a teacher in Tennessee before moving to Georgia in 1917. She taught in Between, Georgia, until 1929.

== Later life ==
She married Luther Cooper in 1924, and had four children with him. Luther died aged 68 in December 1963. Following her husband's death, Cooper lived alone on their farm until 2001, when she moved into a nursing home at the age of 105. She spent her final years in Monroe, Georgia. Cooper died of respiratory failure on December 4, 2012, after contracting stomach flu.

== Longevity ==
Cooper became Georgia's oldest resident on January 19, 2009, following the death of 113-year-old Beatrice Farve. She was thought to be the world's oldest living person after the death of Eunice Sanborn on January 31, 2011 until May 18, 2011, when Brazil's Maria Gomes Valentim was verified as older. On June 21, 2011, Maria Gomes Valentim died, and Cooper became the world's oldest living person. Cooper reportedly attributed her longevity to "minding her own business" and avoiding junk food.

At the time of her 116th birthday in August 2012, Cooper had four children, 11 grandchildren, 13 great-grandchildren and two great-great-grandchildren. In July 2012, a proposal was advanced to name a Georgia bridge in Cooper's honor; a bridge in Between, Georgia, was named Besse Brown Cooper Bridge on August 24, 2012. In October 2013, Cooper's grandson Paul Cooper founded the Besse Brown Cooper Foundation, a nonprofit organization dedicated to "providing financial, legal, medical and public relations support" for supercentenarians worldwide.

== See also ==
- Oldest people
- 100 oldest American people ever
- List of the verified oldest people
