= John Painter (supercentenarian) =

American supercentenarian (1888–2001)

- Born: John George Painter; September 20, 1888; Jackson County, Tennessee, U.S.
- Died: March 1, 2001 (aged 112 years, 162 days); Hermitage Springs, Tennessee, U.S.
- Known for: Oldest living man (November 15, 1999 – March 1, 2001)
- Military career
- Allegiance: United States
- Branch: United States Army
- Service years: 1917–1919
- Conflicts: World War I
- Awards: Tennessee Distinguished Award, Legion of Honour, Croix de Guerre

John George Painter (20 September 1888 – 1 March 2001) was an American supercentenarian who was posthumously recognised as the world's oldest man and oldest American veteran.

== Biography ==
Painter was born on 20 September 1888, on a farm in Jackson County, Tennessee. As a child, he attended school and worked on the farm. Longevity ran in Painter's family; his father lived to 99, and his siblings lived to ages between 87 and 105.

In 1917, at age 29, he enlisted in the United States Army. As a part of Battery D in the 115th Artillery Battalion, he hauled ammunition and artillery supplies, including field guns, transporting all the supplies on horses or mules. Painter saw action at the Meuse-Argonne Offensive. 80 days after the armistice was declared on November 11, 1918, Painter received the highest French honour, the Légion d'honneur award. He also received the Croix de Guerre and was one of only six Tennessee World War I veterans to be awarded The Tennessee Distinguished Award. Painter had to leave his son, Sean Humphrey Painter, when he went to war. He was discharged from service on April 12, 1919, after serving in the army for two years.

After his discharge, Painter pursued a career as a blacksmith and married his childhood sweetheart, Gillie Watson. The couple adopted two daughters. On 19 November 1999, Painter was recognised as the world's oldest veteran at age 111. On 20 September 2000, Tennessee Representative Bart Gordon read a proclamation in honour of John's 112th birthday.

Governor Don Sundquist also declared his birthday "John Painter Day" in Tennessee.

On March 1, 2001, John Painter died aged 112 years, 162 days at his home in Hermitage Springs, Tennessee of a heart attack.

== See also ==
- List of the verified oldest people
