= Elizabeth Francis =

American supercentenarian (1909–2024)

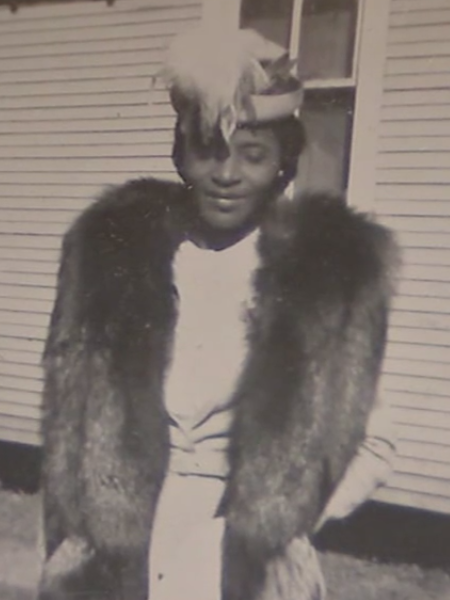
- Francis in 1929
- Born: July 25, 1909; St. Mary Parish, Louisiana, U.S.
- Died: October 22, 2024 (aged 115 years, 89 days); Houston, Texas, U.S.
- Known for: Oldest living person in the United States (February 22, 2024 – October 22, 2024)
- Children: 1

Elizabeth Francis (July 25, 1909 – October 22, 2024) was an American supercentenarian who was the oldest-living person in the United States from the death of Edith Ceccarelli on February 22, 2024, until her own death on October 22, 2024.

== Biography ==
Francis, who was of African-American descent, was born in St. Mary Parish, Louisiana, on July 25, 1909, although she was unsure of what town she was born in. Her mother died in 1920, and she and her five siblings were sent to different homes. She was sent to Houston, Texas, where she was raised by an aunt. She lived next door to her older sister Bertha Johnson (August 6, 1904 – February 21, 2011), before Johnson died at the age of 106; she and Francis were among the oldest siblings on record. She had another sister who lived to the age of 95, and her father died when he was 88.

Francis raised her daughter as a single mother. She moved into her final home in 1999 and would live there until her death, where she lived with her 96-year-old daughter Dorothy Williams (born September 1, 1928), and was cared for by her 69-year-old granddaughter Ethel Harrison. Williams was the oldest person in the world with one living parent.

In the 1970s, Francis ran the coffee shop at KTRK-TV in Houston, and worked there for more than 20 years. She was also very involved with her church, Good Hope Missionary Baptist Church. Francis never learned to drive, so she used the bus or relied on family members for transportation. She had used a wheelchair since 2016. Francis avoided smoking and alcohol her whole life and often grew vegetables in her backyard. She attributed her long life to her faith in God.

On February 22, 2024, Francis became the oldest person in the United States following the death of 116-year-old Edie Ceccarelli of California. Following the death of 117-year-old American-born Spaniard Maria Branyas on August 19, 2024, she became the oldest American-born person and the third-oldest-living person in the world.

Francis died on October 22, 2024, at the age of 115 years and 89 days. Following her death, Naomi Whitehead of Greenville, Pennsylvania, became the oldest-living person in the United States.
