= Emiliano Mercado del Toro =

Puerto Rican supercentenarian (1891–2007)

- Mercado del Toro in December 2006
- Born: August 21, 1891; Cabo Rojo, Puerto Rico, Kingdom of Spain
- Died: January 24, 2007 (aged 115 years, 156 days); Isabela, Puerto Rico
- Resting place: Cementerio Municipal San Martín de Porres in Cabo Rojo, Puerto Rico
- Other name: Emilio
- Known for: World's oldest living man (November 19, 2004 – January 24, 2007); World's oldest living person (December 11, 2006 – January 24, 2007); Oldest verified military veteran ever; Oldest Puerto Rican person ever
- Military career
- Allegiance: United States of America
- Branch: United States Army
- Rank: Private
- Conflicts: World War I

Emiliano Mercado del Toro (August 21, 1891 – January 24, 2007) was a Puerto Rican supercentenarian and military veteran who was, at age 115, the world's oldest person following the death of 116-year-old Elizabeth Bolden on December 11, 2006, until his own death on January 24, 2007. He had already been the world's oldest man from November 19, 2004, upon the death of Fred Harold Hale. At the time of his death in January 2007, aged 115 years and 156 days, Mercado was the second oldest fully validated male ever, behind Danish-American Christian Mortensen's record of 115 years 252 days. Japanese man, Shigechiyo Izumi, was still believed to be older at the time of Mercado's death, but his record was withdrawn by Guinness World Records in 2010.

== Biography ==
Emiliano Mercado del Toro (known to his family as "Emilio") was born on August 21, 1891, in Cabo Rojo, Puerto Rico (at a time when Puerto Rico was a Spanish colony), the son of Delfín Mercado Cáceres and Gumercinda del Toro Padilla. Emiliano worked in the sugarcane fields until the age of 81. He never married and never had children, but said he had three "girlfriends" (love interests) in his life.

=== Accolades ===
Mercado first came to the attention of longevity researchers in 2001, after a story about a 110-year-old veteran in a parade in Puerto Rico. Researchers tried to track him down, but no documents were forthcoming until after the November 2004 death of Fred Harold Hale. By January 2005, Guinness had accepted Mercado as the oldest living man.

Mercado was 27 years old in October 1918 when he was drafted into the United States Army to serve in World War I. He was still at a training camp in Panama when the November 11, 1918 armistice was declared. He was honorably discharged on December 4, 1918, after a total service period of less than two months. Mercado del Toro's brief military service qualified him as a verified World War I veteran. He later became the longest-lived veteran of any military force, exceeding the previous oldest veteran, Antonio Todde.

In 1993, he was honored by U.S. President Bill Clinton with the medal commemorating the 75th anniversary of the signing of the truce that ended World War I. Mercado del Toro, the elder of two siblings, had to move from his familiar Cabo Rojo grounds due to a fall he had in his home when he was 102, which affected his hipbone. His 85-year-old niece took him to live with his relatives, and he was well taken care of by nieces and nephews - and their families, who called him "Tío Millo" ("Uncle Millo")- at their home in Isabela.

The mayor of Isabela, Puerto Rico said a home for the elderly would be renamed in his honor.

=== Later life ===
Mercado could reminisce about being a child when U.S. troops invaded Puerto Rico in 1898, and he clearly remembered the fighting that marked the end of Spain's colonial empire in the Americas. He credited his longevity to (Spanish: bacalao con funche) a boiled corn, codfish and milk cream-like dish, which he had a habit of eating every day.

His last two birthdays were media events in the town of Isabela. Civic leaders and veterans commended Mercado on his endurance and lucid mind, but the "gift" he would enjoy the most was the visit of Puerto Rican vedette and media icon Iris Chacón. In an interview, Mercado claimed to be a great fan of the artist, and particularly of her derrière ("That rump was something serious!", he was quoted as saying). Chacón visited Mercado, who, although could barely see or hear by the time of his 114th birthday, was pleased with her visit. His photo touching Chacón's rear end, with a big smile on his face, made newspaper headlines in Puerto Rico. She returned the following year to greet him. After hearing news of Mercado's death, Chacón was quoted as saying: "I feel like I've lost my own grandfather. I was blessed for knowing him, knowing that I made him happy, and blessed for the anecdotes and wishes he told me the times I met him. His wisdom is something I learned a lot from. His life is an example of how you're supposed to live your life, happily and doing good, for it will give you longevity and goodwill from everyone."

He was buried at Cementerio Municipal San Martín de Porres of his native town of Cabo Rojo, with mayors, legislators, fellow veterans, and Iris Chacón, in attendance. After his death, Emma Tillman became the world's oldest person and Tomoji Tanabe became the world's oldest man.

== See also ==
- List of Puerto Ricans
- List of the verified oldest people
- Longevity
