= Naomi Whitehead =

American supercentenarian (born 1910)

- Whitehead in 1913
- Born: Naomi Washington; September 26, 1910 (age 116 years, 49 days); Patterson, Georgia, U.S.
- Known for: Oldest living person in the United States (since October 22, 2024)
- Spouse: Sylvester Whitehead (m. 1930; died 1979)
- Children: 3 (all deceased)

Naomi Washington Whitehead (née Washington; born September 26, 1910) is an American supercentenarian who has been the oldest living person in the United States, currently at the age of 116 years, 49 days, since the death of Elizabeth Francis on October 22, 2024, and the world's second oldest living person since the death of Marie-Rose Tessier on February 10, 2026.

== Biography ==
Naomi Washington was born on September 26, 1910, in rural Georgia, to Douglas and Pauline (née Young) Washington, where she grew up on a farm picking cotton and tobacco. She is of African American descent. In her youth, she lived in Patterson, Georgia with her older siblings: Douglas Jr., Clarence, Ellen, and Viola.

Whitehead, in her adult years, moved to West Salem in Mercer County, part of Greater Pittsburgh. She didn't move into assisted living until 2011, when she was 101 years old, shortly after losing her last surviving son, Parrish, who died the same year, aged 78.

She has stated that she never smoked or drank alcohol, and is Christian, having told reporters, "I'll live as long as the Lord lets me." Several of her grandchildren attribute her long life to her belief in God. Whitehead lives at St. Paul's Senior Living Community in Greenville, Pennsylvania.

== Personal life ==
In 1930, Washington married Sylvester Whitehead (1908–1979). They had three sons: Sylvester Jr. (1931–2004), Parrish L. (1933–2011) and Elbert T. (1935–2006).
