= Susannah Mushatt Jones =

American supercentenarian (1899–2016)

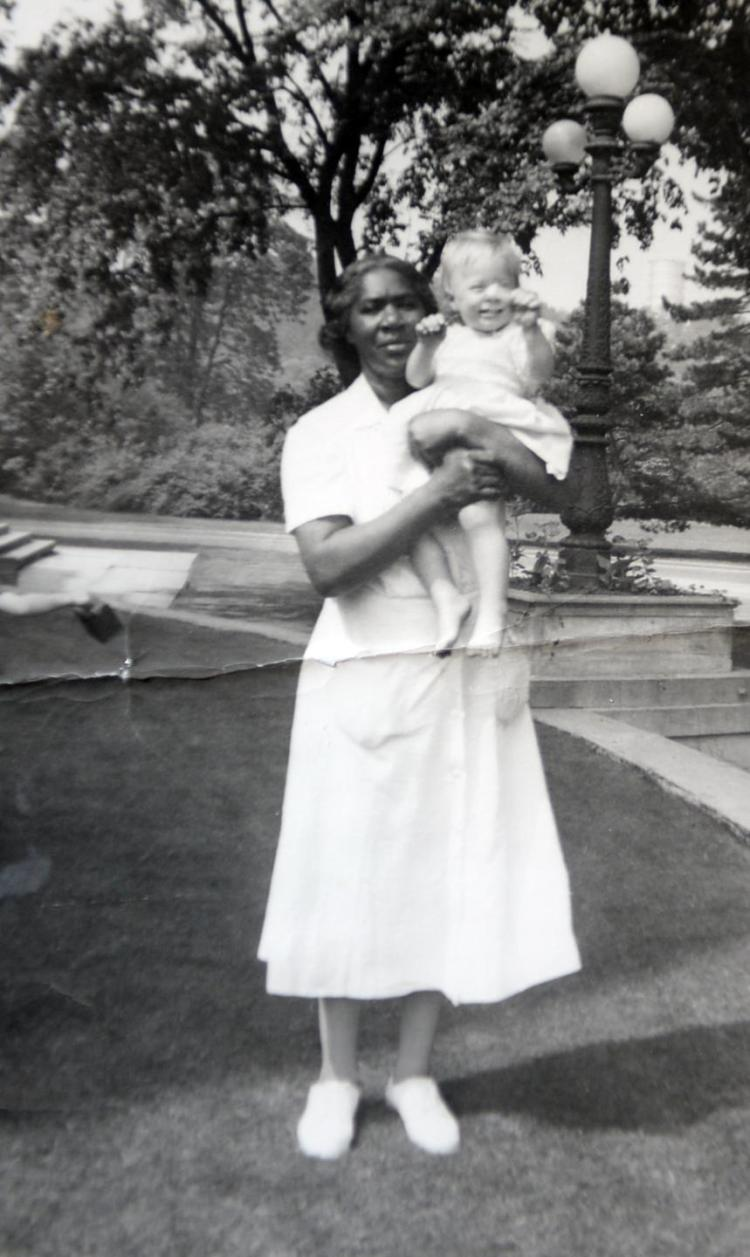
- Born: Susannah Mushatt; July 6, 1899; Lowndes County, Alabama, U.S.
- Died: May 12, 2016 (aged 116 years, 311 days); New York City, U.S.
- Known for: Oldest living person (June 17, 2015 – May 12, 2016)
- Spouse: Henry Jones (m. 1928; div. 1933)
- Parents: Callie Mushatt; Mary Mushatt

Susannah Mushatt Jones (July 6, 1899 – May 12, 2016) was an American supercentenarian who was, aged 116 years and 311 days, the world's oldest living person and the last living American verified to have been born in the 19th century. She received tributes from the United States House of Representatives and from the Alabama House of Representatives "for a remarkable lifetime of exceptional achievement lived during three centuries."

== Biography ==
Susannah Mushatt was born to Callie and Mary Mushatt on July 6, 1899, in Lowndes County, Alabama. She was the third child and oldest daughter of eleven children. Her parents were African-American sharecroppers who farmed the same land as her grandparents.

As a young woman she worked in the fields, and later said she was determined to find different work. In 1922, she graduated from the Calhoun Colored School, and the graduation roster recognized her for studying "Negro Music in France". After graduation, she wanted to become a teacher and was accepted to Tuskegee Institute's Teacher's Program. Her parents could not afford tuition, so in 1923 she moved to New York during the early stages of the Harlem Renaissance.

In 1928, she married Henry Jones but divorced him in 1933, saying in 2011 that she "didn't know what became of him", and had no children. She worked for wealthy families taking care of their children for $7 a week, and during this time she supported many of her relatives as they moved to New York. She also used some of her salary to establish The Calhoun Club, which was a college scholarship fund for African-American students at her high school. She was active in her neighborhood for almost 30 years, participating in the "tenant patrol team".

In 1965, she retired and lived with her niece Lavilla Watson and helped care for Watson's baby son. At the time of her death she resided at the Vandalia Senior Center in East New York, Brooklyn, and had more than 100 nieces and nephews.

== Health, diet and lifestyle ==
Jones became legally blind when she was 100 and was partially deaf; she spoke rarely and used a wheelchair. Besides a multivitamin, she only took medication for high blood pressure. She refused cataract surgery or a recommended pacemaker and never had a mammogram or a colonoscopy. Three to four times a year, she met with a primary care physician.

Jones never smoked or consumed alcohol. She slept about ten hours a night and napped throughout the day. For breakfast, she always ate four strips of bacon along with scrambled eggs and grits. She also ate bacon throughout the day.

In 2022, researchers cited Susannah Mushatt Jones in a study that connected longevity to positive attitudes towards the aging process itself.

== Final years and death ==
Jones celebrated her last five birthdays at the Vandalia Senior Center in Brooklyn. On her 112th, she received tribute letters from both New York City Mayor Michael Bloomberg and New York Governor Andrew Cuomo. After the celebration, she said, "I wish it could be like this all the time."

Jones celebrated her 114th birthday six days late. Her family, friends and Brooklyn District Attorney Charles Hynes praised her accomplishments. On her 115th birthday, her niece, Lois Judge, told WABC-TV that Jones "gets tired easily these days, but it has been a good day today." Jones did not speak at the celebration. Her great-great niece, a baby named Susannah after her, was also present.

Jones became the world's oldest living person and one of two remaining people verified to have been born in the 1800s (along with Italian woman Emma Morano) upon the death of Jeralean Talley on June 17, 2015. On July 3, 2015, three days before her 116th birthday, she was presented with a certificate from Guinness World Records recognizing her as the oldest person alive.

Jones died in her sleep on the evening of May 12, 2016, aged 116 years, 311 days. Following her death, Emma Morano became the world's oldest living person as well as the last living person who was born in the 1800s.

== See also ==
- List of the verified oldest people
- List of supercentenarians from the United States § 100 oldest known Americans
