= List of the oldest people by country =

This is a list of the oldest people by country and in selected territories. It includes the individual(s) for each given country or territory who are reported to have had the longest lifespan. Such records can only be determined to the extent that the given country's records are reliable. Comprehensive birth registration is largely a 20th-century phenomenon, so records establishing human longevity are necessarily fragmentary. The earliest comprehensive recordkeeping systems arose in Western Europe. For example, the United Kingdom organized a central recordkeeping system for England and Wales in 1837, making it compulsory by 1874.

== Oldest ever ==
This list comprises longest-lived individuals who were born and are living or died in each country. Where known, records for both males and females are noted, as are those born in one country who emigrated to another. Multiple entries for a given country and sex indicate that the oldest person is disputed. Entries for living people are rendered by

Living (Validated)
Unvalidated

.

| Country | Name | Sex | Birth date | Death date | Age |
|---|---|---|---|---|---|
| Afghanistan | Abdul Majid Zabuli (Note: Born in the Emirate of Afghanistan when it was a British protected state, during 1879–1919.) | M | 14 August 1896 | 23 November 1998 | 102 years, 101 days |
| Albania | Zenepe Pirani (Note: Pirani was born in Podgorica, then a part of the Principality of Montenegro; it is now the capital of Montenegro.) (born in Montenegro) | F | 10 May 1910 | 5 July 2021 | 111 years, 56 days |
| Albania | Vasilika Anastas (died in the U.S.) | F | 15 December 1912 | 16 July 2023 | 110 years, 213 days |
| Albania | Fana Naci | F | 9 May 1914 | 1 July 2024 | 110 years, 53 days |
| Albania | Arshi Bazaj (Note: Born in a part of the Ottoman Empire that is now Albania.) (died in the U.S.) | M | 20 May 1906 | 26 December 2015 | 109 years, 220 days |
| Albania | Ndue Melyshi | M | 13 February 1911 | 31 July 2020 | 109 years, 169 days |
| Algeria | Anne Primout (Note: Born in the French colony of Algérie; it is now an independent country.) (died in France) | F | 5 October 1890 | 26 March 2005 | 114 years, 172 days |
| Algeria | Émile Fourcade (died in France) | M | 29 July 1884 | 29 December 1995 | 111 years, 153 days |
| Algeria | Saïdani Khalti Mama | F | 18 September 1901 | 4 December 2015 | 114 years, 77 days |
| Algeria | Omar Aït Taleb | M | 19 November 1910 | 3 November 2020 | 109 years, 350 days |
| Andorra | Concepció Picolo Caujola (born in Spain) | F | 8 November 1911 | 7 July 2019 | 107 years, 241 days |
| Andorra | Maria Areny Cabanes | F | 3 July 1913 | 15 January 2021 | 107 years, 196 days |
| Andorra | Daniel Armengol Millat | M | 27 May 1915 | 26 January 2019 | 103 years, 244 days |
| Angola | Inacia Carmelinho (Note: Carmelinho was born in Angola, which was at that time a Portuguese colony.) (died in Portugal) | F | 17 June 1911 | 20 August 2023 | 112 years, 64 days |
| Antigua and Barbuda | Irene Carlos (Note: Born in a part of the colony of the British Leeward Islands that now the independent country Antigua and Barbuda.) | F | 23 January 1902 | 8 September 2012 | 110 years, 229 days |
| Antigua and Barbuda | Sydney Walling | M | 12 July 1907 | 8 October 2009 | 102 years, 88 days |
| Argentina | Casilda Benegas Gallego (born in Paraguay) | F | 8 April 1907 | 28 June 2022 | 115 years, 81 days |
| Argentina | Evangelista Luisa Lopez de Contarino | F | 21 June 1907 | 28 August 2021 | 114 years, 68 days |
| Argentina | Juan Rodriguez (born in Bolivia) | M | 25 June 1910 | 3 February 2021 | 110 years, 223 days |
| Argentina | José Agustín Navarro | M | 28 August 1912 | 11 August 2022 | 109 years, 348 days |
| Armenia | Lucy Mirigian (Note: Mirigian was born in Erzurum in Erzurum vilayet, which was part of Western Armenia in the Ottoman Empire.) (born in Turkey, died in the U.S.) | F | 15 August 1906 | 12 February 2021 | 114 years, 181 days |
| Armenia | Arpik Asryan (Note: Born in a part of the Caucasus Viceroyalty of the Russian Empire.) | F | 23 September 1905 | 20 December 2018 | 113 years, 88 days |
| Armenia | Vartan Anooshian (Note: Anooshian was born in Haght in Sebastia, which was part of Western Armenia in the Ottoman Empire.) (born in Turkey, died in the U.S.) | M | 13 February 1894 | 22 May 2004 | 110 years, 99 days |
| Armenia | Romeo Halayan | M | 11 January 1872 | 30 January 1982 | 110 years, 19 days |
| Australia | Christina Cock (Note: Cock was born in the former British colony of Victoria, which is now part of Australia.) | F | 25 December 1887 | 22 May 2002 | 114 years, 148 days |
| Australia | Ken Weeks | M | 5 October 1913 | Living | 113 years, 47 days |
| Austria | Luise Pompe (Note: Pompe was born in Czernowitz, which was then the capital of Bukovina in Austria-Hungary; it is now Chernivtsi in Ukraine.) | F | 13 October 1908 | 11 November 2022 | 114 years, 29 days |
| Austria | Leopold Vietoris (Note: Born in a part of Austria-Hungary that is now Austria.) | M | 4 June 1891 | 9 April 2002 | 110 years, 309 days |
| Azerbaijan | Vasilya Şaripova | F | 25 December 1908 | 24 November 2019 | 110 years, 334 days |
| Azerbaijan | Hilal Ibrahimov | M | 5 February 1915 | 30 March 2025 | 110 years, 53 days |
| Bahamas | Matilda Robinson (Note: Bahamas was at that time part of the British West Indies; it is now an independent country.) | F | 19 August 1914 | 30 July 2025 | 110 years, 345 days |
| Bahamas | Jeffrey Capron (born in the Turks and Caicos) | M | 16 May 1914 | 22 January 2022 | 107 years, 251 days |
| Bahamas | Howard Kemp | M | 10 January 1912 | 28 October 2018 | 106 years, 291 days |
| Bahrain | Al-Hajjah Amna Al-Sabah (Note: Born in Bahrain and its Dependencies which was back then a British protectorate, it is now an independent country.) | F | 1914 | 22 October 2017 | 103 years, 0 days to 103 years, 294 days (Note: Al-Sabah's exactly date of birth is uncertain, but she was at least 103 at the time of her death in 2017.) |
| Bangladesh | Debendra Nath Ghosh (Note: Born in a part of British-ruled India, under the Raj.) | M | 22 April 1890 | 11 January 1999 | 108 years, 264 days |
| Bangladesh | Sufia Khatun | F | 6 May 1922 | 7 January 2023 | 100 years, 246 days |
| Barbados | James Sisnett (Note: Barbados was at the time of their births part of the British West Indies; it is now an independent country.) | M | 22 February 1900 | 23 May 2013 | 113 years, 90 days |
| Barbados | Violet Cave (died in the U.S.) | F | 28 February 1909 | 3 March 2020 | 111 years, 4 days |
| Barbados | Edna Cumberbatch | F | 14 December 1908 | 19 November 2019 | 110 years, 340 days |
| Belarus | Felicia Zaiko (Note: Zaiko was a native of Poznań, which was then a part of the German Empire; it is now located in Poland.) (born in Poland) | F | 30 November 1912 | 11 January 2026 | 113 years, 42 days |
| Belarus | Leonid Skvortsov (Note: Skvortsov was born in Vologda Oblast, which was then part of the Russian Empire; it is now located in present-day Russia.) (born in Russia) | M | 19 March 1916 | 26 January 2025 | 108 years, 313 days |
| Belgium | Bronislava Kuznetsova (Note: Kuznetsova was born in Ivanovo Oblast, which was then part of the Russian Empire; it is now located in present-day Russia.)(born in Russia) | F | 31 December 1903 | 10 January 2017 | 113 years, 10 days |
| Belgium | Joanna Turcksin-Deroover | F | 3 June 1890 | 6 December 2002 | 112 years, 186 days |
| Belgium | Jan Machiel Reyskens (Note: Reyskens lived (from 1897) and died in the Netherlands, but kept his Belgian citizenship.) (died in the Netherlands) | M | 11 May 1878 | 7 January 1990 | 111 years, 241 days |
| Belgium | Jan Goossenaerts | M | 30 October 1900 | 21 March 2012 | 111 years, 143 days |
| Belize | Gilbert Ellis (Note: Born in Belize, which at the time of their birth was the colony of British Honduras.) | M | 24 September 1916 | 8 August 2026 | 109 years, 318 days |
| Belize | Alice Banner (died in the U.S.) | F | 13 October 1915 | 12 November 2024 | 109 years, 30 days |
| Belize | Leonora Patnett | F | 13 December 1913 | 9 May 2022 | 108 years, 147 days |
| Benin | Salomon Biokou (Note: Biokou was born in French Dahomey, which became the Republic of Benin in 1975.) | M | 7 February 1902 | 2 October 2008 | 106 years, 238 days |
| Bolivia | Angelica Ordonez de Colodro | F | 26 April 1910 | 12 March 2021 | 110 years, 320 days |
| Bolivia | Juan Rodriguez (died in Argentina) | M | 25 June 1910 | 3 February 2021 | 110 years, 223 days |
| Bolivia | Benigno Garrado Peñaranda | M | 28 February 1912 | 2 February 2021 | 108 years, 340 days |
| Bosnia and Herzegovina | Ajka Lokmić (Note: Born in Bosnia and Herzegovina, which was at that time ruled by Austria-Hungary; it is now an independent country.) | F | 4 May 1914 | 17 August 2024 | 110 years, 105 days |
| Bosnia and Herzegovina | Jovan Jovanović (Note: Jovanović was born in the Principality of Montenegro; it is now Montenegro.) (born in Montenegro) | M | 16 September 1906 | 1 October 2016 | 110 years, 15 days |
| Bosnia and Herzegovina | Jovo Latinović (died in Serbia) | M | 19 August 1901 | 15 April 2011 | 109 years, 239 days |
| Bosnia and Herzegovina | Dragoljub Galić | M | 12 October 1909 | 26 August 2018 | 108 years, 318 days |
| Botswana | Gaositwe Chiepe (Note: Born in the Bechuanaland Protectorate under the control of the United Kingdom, which is now the independent country of Botswana.) | F | 20 October 1922 | 26 January 2025 | 102 years, 98 days |
| Brazil | Francisca Celsa dos Santos | F | 21 October 1904 | 5 October 2021 | 116 years, 349 days |
| Brazil | João Marinho Neto | M | 5 October 1912 | Living | 114 years, 47 days |
| Bulgaria | Anna Tomova | F | 14 May 1914 | 30 January 2025 | 110 years, 261 days |
| Bulgaria | Boris Damyanov | M | 11 September 1904 | 20 December 2014 | 110 years, 100 days |
| Burkina Faso | Alfred Diban Ki-Zerbo (Note: Born in the independent regions of the Mossi Kingdoms which now are known as Burkina Faso.) | M | 31 January 1875 | 10 May 1980 | 105 years, 100 days |
| Burundi | Lazaro Busuku (Note: Busuku was born in Burundi which was part of the colony of German East Africa.) (died in the U.S.) | M | 1 January 1911 | 22 November 2015 | 104 years, 325 days |
| Cambodia | Bhante Dharmawara (Note: Dharmawara was born in Cambodia, which was at the time of his birth part of French Indochina; it is now an independent country.) (died in the U.S.) | M | 12 February 1889 | 26 June 1999 | 110 years, 134 days |
| Cambodia | Chau Sen Cocsal Chhum (Note: born in South Vietnam, then part of French Indochina, today part of Vietnam.) (Born in Vietnam) | M | 1 September 1905 | 22 January 2009 | 103 years, 143 days |
| Cameroon | Victor Mukete (Note: Born in French Cameroon, which was at that time part of French Equatorial Africa.) | M | 15 November 1918 | 10 April 2021 | 102 years, 146 days |
| Canada | Marie-Louise Meilleur | F | 29 August 1880 | 16 April 1998 | 117 years, 230 days |
| Canada | Arthur Nash (born in the UK) | M | 7 January 1885 | 4 November 1996 | 111 years, 302 days |
| Canada | James McCoubrey (Note: McCoubrey was born in the Colony of Newfoundland, then a separate British colony, now part of Canada.) (died in the U.S.) | M | 13 September 1901 | 5 July 2013 | 111 years, 295 days |
| Canada | Reuben Sinclair | M | 5 December 1911 | 27 August 2023 | 111 years, 265 days |
| Cape Verde | Adelina Domingues (Note: Born in Cape Verde, which was at the time of their birth a Portuguese colony; it is now an independent country.) (died in the U.S.) | F | 19 February 1888 | 21 August 2002 | 114 years, 183 days |
| Cape Verde | Maria Veiga Amado | F | 9 October 1905 | 6 May 2018 | 112 years, 209 days |
| Cape Verde | Albino Teixeira (Note: Born and died in the Portuguese colony of Cape Verde; it is now independent.) | M | 8 October 1861 | 28 November 1969 | 108 years, 51 days |
| Chad | Cheré Abit (Note: Abit was born in French Chad, which became independent in 1960.) | M | 1 January 1925 | 22 August 2024 | 99 years, 234 days |
| Chile | María Mercedes Díaz Quijano | F | 27 June 1898 | 4 December 2012 | 114 years, 160 days |
| Chile | Manuel Benavente Sanhueza | M | 25 September 1909 | 21 March 2021 | 111 years, 177 days |
| China | Du Pinhua (Note: Du was born in Sichuan Province, then part of the Qing Dynasty of Imperial China, which is now in the People's Republic of China.) | F | 22 April 1886 | 11 December 2006 | 120 years, 233 days |
| China | Lv Zijian | M | 22 November 1893 | 21 October 2012 | 118 years, 334 days |
| Colombia | Sofía Rojas | F | 13 August 1907 | 30 July 2022 | 114 years, 351 days |
| Colombia | Efraín Antonio Ríos García | M | 4 April 1910 | 11 January 2024 | 113 years, 282 days |
| Costa Rica | Marita Camacho Quirós | F | 10 March 1911 | 20 June 2025 | 114 years, 102 days |
| Costa Rica | Faustino Vargas Pérez | M | 27 September 1896 | 20 August 2008 | 111 years, 328 days |
| Croatia | Jelisaveta Veljković (Note: Veljković was born in Ravna Gora, which was then a part of Austria-Hungary; it is now located in Croatia.) (died in Serbia) | F | 18 July 1904 | 20 October 2016 | 112 years, 94 days |
| Croatia | Nena Tolj (Note: Tolj was a native born of Uzhhorod, which was then a part Austria-Hungary; it is now located in Ukraine.) (born in Ukraine) | F | 2 July 1901 | 30 November 2011 | 110 years, 151 days |
| Croatia | Nina Valjalo (Note: Valjalo was a native of Vodovađa, which was then a part of Austria-Hungary; it is now located in Croatia.) | F | 6 July 1908 | 29 October 2018 | 110 years, 115 days |
| Croatia | Ezio Ongaro (Note: Ongaro was born in Labin, which at the time of his birth was a part of Austria-Hungary.) (died in Italy) | M | 20 June 1907 | 12 April 2017 | 109 years, 296 days |
| Croatia | Josip Kršul (Note: Kršul was a native of Selce, which was then a part of Austria-Hungary; it is now located in Croatia.) | M | 10 December 1911 | 5 March 2021 | 109 years, 85 days |
| Cuba | Faustina Sarmiento Pupo | F | 15 February 1905 | 16 September 2019 | 114 years, 213 days |
| Cuba | Pedro Batista Layana | M | 25 June 1909 | 7 March 2021 | 111 years, 255 days |
| Cyprus | Milia Pediou (Note: Born in British Cyprus, which is now the Republic of Cyprus.) | F | 31 October 1912 | 3 August 2023 | 110 years, 276 days |
| Cyprus | Michael Klanga (died in the UK) | M | 7 January 1907 | 2 July 2015 | 108 years, 176 days |
| Cyprus | Yiannis Pipis | M | 25 November 1889 | 28 January 1997 | 107 years, 64 days |
| Czech Republic | Emma Janásekova (Note: Born in Prague, which was then a part of Austria-Hungary: it is now located in the Czech Republic. She died in the Czech Socialist Republic, part of Czechoslovakia.) (born in Slovakia) | F | 21 November 1871 | 10 December 1984 | 113 years, 19 days |
| Czech Republic | Karel Janšek (Note: Janšek was a native of Plzen, which was then a part of Austria-Hungary; it is now the city of the Czech Republic. She died in the Czech Socialist Republic, part of Czechoslovakia.) | M | 31 December 1859 | 10 December 1970 | 110 years, 344 days |
| Democratic Republic of the Congo | Luhembwe Alfani (Note: Born in Belgian Congo.) | M | 1922 or 1923 | Living | 103 years, 14 days to 104 years, 13 days |
| Denmark | Christian Mortensen (died in the U.S.) | M | 16 August 1882 | 25 April 1998 | 115 years, 252 days |
| Denmark | Kirsten Schwalbe | F | 10 March 1914 | Living | 112 years, 256 days |
| Denmark | Jens Peter Westergaard | M | 26 April 1914 | 23 July 2024 | 110 years, 88 days |
| Djibouti | Sayed Mahamoud Djilani (Note: Djilani was born in French Somaliland, which became independent Djibouti in 1977.) | M | 1 January 1921 | 14 June 2025 | 104 years, 164 days |
| Dominica | Violet Joseph (Note: Born in Dominica, which was at the time of their birth part of the colony of the British Leeward Islands; it is now an independent country.) | F | 28 January 1899 | 4 October 2010 | 111 years, 249 days |
| Dominica | Asher Timothy | M | 28 April 1917 | 3 April 2026 | 108 years, 340 days |
| Dominican Republic | Tomás Pinales Figuereo | M | 31 March 1906 | 24 September 2020 | 114 years, 177 days |
| Dominican Republic | Manuela Peña Hernández | F | 17 June 1907 | 31 January 2020 | 112 years, 228 days |
| Ecuador | María Capovilla | F | 14 September 1889 | 27 August 2006 | 116 years, 347 days |
| Ecuador | Julio Cesar Mora | M | 10 March 1910 | 22 October 2020 | 110 years, 226 days |
| Egypt | Wasfi Mankarios Morcos (Note: Born in the Sultanate of Egypt, a United Kingdom protectorate until the British forced the Unilateral Declaration of Egyptian Independence in 1922.) (died in Canada) | M | 12 March 1914 | 12 August 2021 | 107 years, 153 days |
| El Salvador | Santos Hildebrando Rivas García | M | 17 August 1911 | 17 April 2023 | 111 years, 243 days |
| El Salvador | Josefa Rodriguez Chanta | F | 19 March 1913 | 4 November 2024 | 111 years, 230 days |
| Equatorial Guinea | Francisco Malabo Beosá | M | 23 June 1896 | 16 November 2001 | 105 years, 146 days |
| Eritrea | Abune Phillipos (Note: Born in the colony of Italian Eritrea, it is now an independent country.) | M | 29 September 1901 | 17 September 2002 | 100 years, 353 days |
| Estonia | Ottilie-Armilde Tinnuri (Note: Estonia was at the time of their births a part of the Russian Empire; it is now an independent country.) | F | 3 February 1914 | 1 April 2024 | 110 years, 58 days |
| Estonia | Mohammad Ali Edalat (born in Iran) | M | 23 October 1915 | 7 February 2024 | 108 years, 107 days |
| Estonia | Arved Tamm | M | 31 January 1910 | 14 November 2017 | 107 years, 287 days |
| Fiji | Dorothy Vine (Note: Born in the Colony of Fiji; it is now an independent country.) (died in Australia) | F | 16 April 1915 | 10 April 2025 | 109 years, 359 days |
| Fiji | Bechu Prasad | M | 10 May 1900 | 6 September 2005 | 105 years, 119 days |
| Fiji | Jale Bainisika | M | 1914 or 1915 | 15 February 2020 | 105 years, 0 days to 105 years, 364 days |
| Finland | Maria Rothovius (Note: Finland and its islands were then an autonomous part of the Russian Empire.) | F | 2 October 1887 | 17 June 2000 | 112 years, 259 days |
| Finland | Aarne Arvonen | M | 4 August 1897 | 1 January 2009 | 111 years, 150 days |
| France | Jeanne Calment (Note: Calment's case was disputed in a Russian study posted online in November 2018, and a followup paper published in January 2019, although other researchers have dismissed this hypothesis on the basis of extensive prior research into Calment's life.) | F | 21 February 1875 | 4 August 1997 | 122 years, 164 days |
| France | Andres Salvador (born in Philippines) | M | 14 March 1876 | 3 January 1990 | 113 years, 295 days |
| France | Georges Thomas | M | 19 November 1911 | 1 June 2024 | 112 years, 195 days |
| Gabon | Catherine Mba (Note: Mba was born in a part of French Equatorial Africa that is now Gabon.) | F | 15 May 1918 | 10 November 2025 | 107 years, 179 days |
| Gambia | Ajaratou Dandang Sanyang (Note: Sanyang was born in British Gambia.) | F | 3 May 1911 | 2 August 2011 | 100 years, 91 days |
| Georgia | Nakipe Davitadze (Note: Born in part of the Russian Empire now known as Georgia.) | F | 4 July 1914 | Living | 112 years, 140 days |
| Georgia | Mushni Subeliani | M | 19 April 1913 | 8 March 2024 | 110 years, 324 days |
| Germany | Augusta Holtz (Note: Holtz was born in Czarnikau, which was then part of the German Empire; it is now Czarnków and located in Poland.) (died in the U.S.) | F | 3 August 1871 | 21 October 1986 | 115 years, 79 days |
| Germany | Cacelie Bohler (Note: Bohler was born in Telšiai, which was then part of the Russian Empire, now in Lithuania.) (born in the Lithuania) | F | 1 September 1911 | 10 November 2026 | 115 years, 70 days |
| Germany | Charlotte Kretschmann (Note: Born in Breslau, then in the German Empire, now Wrocław in Poland.) | F | 3 December 1909 | 27 August 2024 | 114 years, 268 days |
| Germany | Gustav Gerneth (Note: Gerneth was born in Stettin, which was then part of the German Empire. It is now part of Poland.) | M | 15 October 1905 | 21 October 2019 | 114 years, 6 days |
| Germany | Hermann Dornemann | M | 27 May 1893 | 2 March 2005 | 111 years, 279 days |
| Ghana | Nana Afia Kobi Serwaa Ampem II (Note: Born in the British colony of the Gold Coast, now the independent country of Ghana.) | F | 1907 | 14 November 2016 | 108 years, 319 days to 109 years, 318 days |
| Ghana | Osman Nuhu Sharubutu | M | 23 April 1919 | Living | 107 years, 212 days |
| Greece | Amalia Arvanetes (died in the U.S.) | F | 6 February 1903 | 20 March 2016 | 113 years, 43 days |
| Greece | Ioanna Proiou-Dimitriadou (Note: Proiou-Dimitriadou was born in Icaria, then in the Sanjak of Sakız of the Ottoman Empire; it is now part of Greece.) | F | 15 July 1911 | 5 April 2023 | 111 years, 264 days |
| Greece | Gregory Pandazes (Note: Pandazes was born in Midilli (Lesbos) in the Ottoman Empire, which is now part of Greece.) (died in the U.S.) | M | 15 January 1873 | 22 December 1983 | 110 years, 341 days |
| Greece | Konstantinos Papadamis | M | 26 December 1900 | 4 August 2010 | 109 years, 221 days |
| Grenada | Olga David (Note: Born in a part of the British Windward Islands, that is now the independent country of Grenada.) | F | 14 January 1917 | 11 April 2026 | 109 years, 87 days |
| Grenada | Judith Mends (lives in United States) (Note: Born in a part of the British Windward Islands, that is now the independent country of Grenada.) | F | 21 June 1916 | Living | 110 years, 153 days |
| Guatemala | Dolores Gaitan Ortiz (died in the U.S.) | F | 16 September 1906 | 1 April 2017 | 110 years, 197 days |
| Guatemala | Jorge Solorzano Cifuentes | M | 21 July 1906 | 28 October 2016 | 110 years, 99 days |
| Guatemala | Hercilda Orellana de Giron | F | 31 December 1915 | 22 March 2025 | 109 years, 81 days |
| Guyana | Matilda Lewis (Note: Born in British Guiana, which was then part of the British Empire. It is now Guyana.) | F | 16 May 1896 | 30 June 2009 | 113 years, 45 days |
| Guyana | Sonny Hendricks | M | 31 December 1900 | 9 October 2011 | 110 years, 282 days |
| Haiti | Vertulie Giordani (died in the U.S.) | F | 18 March 1904 | 30 October 2016 | 112 years, 226 days |
| Haiti | Duranord Veillard (died in the U.S.) | M | 28 February 1907 | 1 June 2018 | 111 years, 93 days |
| Honduras | María del Pilar Salinas | F | 12 October 1914 | Living | 112 years, 40 days |
| Honduras | Jose Angel Flores Vallecillo | M | 19 August 1914 | 7 September 2024 | 110 years, 19 days |
| Hungary | Veronika Zsilinszki (Note: Zsilinszki was born in Kevevára, then in Austria-Hungary, now Kovin in Serbia.) (born in Serbia) | F | 4 February 1908 | 20 April 2021 | 113 years, 75 days |
| Hungary | Elizabeth Stefan (Note: Hungary was at that time part of Austria-Hungary.) (died in the U.S.) | F | 13 May 1895 | 9 April 2008 | 112 years, 332 days |
| Hungary | Jánosné Kudász | F | 27 April 1902 | 19 March 2013 | 110 years, 326 days |
| Hungary | Zoltan Sarosy (died in Canada) | M | 23 August 1906 | 19 June 2017 | 110 years, 300 days |
| Hungary | Rezső Gallai | M | 29 January 1904 | 25 September 2014 | 110 years, 239 days |
| Iceland | Adriana Jóhannsdóttir (Note: Iceland at the time of their births was a part of Denmark; it is now an independent country.) | F | 1 April 1901 | 30 March 2012 | 110 years, 364 days |
| Iceland | Georg Ólafsson | M | 26 March 1909 | 22 February 2017 | 107 years, 333 days |
| India | Kiemsina Kharmawlong | F | 17 September 1900 | 23 June 2015 | 114 years, 279 days |
| India | Shivakumara Swami | M | 1 April 1907 | 21 January 2019 | 111 years, 295 days |
| Indonesia | Soekartini Djojohadikusumo (Note: Born in the Dutch East Indies.) | F | 19 March 1919 | Living | 107 years, 247 days |
| Iran | Mansoor Pazargad (died in the U.S.) | M | 28 December 1896 | 7 January 2011 | 114 years, 10 days |
| Iran | Hossein Wahid Khorasani | M | 1 January 1921 | 17 November 2026 | 105 years, 320 days |
| Iran | Mahlagha Mallah | F | 21 September 1917 | 8 November 2021 | 104 years, 48 days |
| Iraq | Mukarram Talabani (Note: Born in the British protectorate of Mandatory Iraq, which later became an independent state.) | M | 3 March 1923 | 24 January 2025 | 101 years, 327 days |
| Iraq | Malik Dohan al-Hassan (Note: Born in the territory of Ottoman Iraq, which is now an independent country.) (died in Jordan) | M | 1 July 1919 | 23 May 2021 | 101 years, 326 days |
| (Republic of Ireland) Ireland | Kathleen Snavely (Note: Born in Ireland, which was part of the United Kingdom before the Anglo-Irish Treaty in 1921.) (died in the U.S.) | F | 16 February 1902 | 6 July 2015 | 113 years, 140 days |
| (Republic of Ireland) Ireland | Katherine Plunket | F | 22 November 1820 | 14 October 1932 | 111 years, 327 days |
| (Republic of Ireland) Ireland | James Hanlon (died in the U.S.) | M | 17 October 1891 | 27 February 2001 | 109 years, 133 days |
| (Republic of Ireland) Ireland | Michael O'Connor | M | 13 October 1913 | 21 August 2022 | 108 years, 312 days |
| Israel | Israel Kristal (Note: Born in Congress Poland, part of the Russian Empire, which is today Poland.) (born in Poland) | M | 15 September 1903 | 11 August 2017 | 113 years, 330 days |
| Israel | Maria Pogonowska (born in Poland) | F | 30 October 1897 | 15 July 2009 | 111 years, 258 days |
| Italy | Emma Morano | F | 29 November 1899 | 15 April 2017 | 117 years, 137 days |
| Italy | Antonio Todde | M | 22 January 1889 | 3 January 2002 | 112 years, 346 days |
| Ivory Coast | Bernard Binlin Dadié (Note: Born in a part of the colony of French West Africa that is now Ivory Coast (Côte d'Ivoire).) | M | 10 January 1916 | 9 March 2019 | 103 years, 58 days |
| Jamaica | Violet Brown (Note: Born in Jamaica, then a British colony.) | F | 10 March 1900 | 15 September 2017 | 117 years, 189 days |
| Jamaica | Alexander Grant (died un the U.S.) | M | 10 June 1904 | 28 March 2015 | 110 years, 291 days |
| Japan | Kane Tanaka | F | 2 January 1903 | 19 April 2022 | 119 years, 107 days |
| Japan | Jiroemon Kimura | M | 19 April 1897 | 12 June 2013 | 116 years, 54 days |
| Jordan | Malik Dohan al-Hassan (born in Iraq) | M | 1 July 1919 | 23 May 2021 | 101 years, 326 days |
| Jordan | Hasan Karmi (Note: born in the British mandate of Palestine.) (born i Palestine) | M | 1905 | 5 May 2007 | 101 years, 125 daysto 102 years, 124 days |
| Kenya | Charles Njonjo (Note: Born in the Kenya Colony.) | M | 23 January 1920 | 2 January 2022 | 101 years, 344 days |
| Kosovo | Fikrije Loki (Note: Loki was born in the village of Bicec, municipality of Kacanik, then in the Kingdom of Serbia; it is now present-day Kosovo.) (died in North Macedonia) | F | 10 January 1914 | 13 September 2024 | 110 years, 247 days |
| Kosovo | Sherife Ninaj (Note: Born in a part of the Vilayet of Kosovo that is now in Kosovo.) | F | 13 May 1910 | 8 March 2020 | 109 years, 300 days |
| Kosovo | Ahmet Gashi | M | 1 September 1908 | 10 May 2016 | 107 years, 252 days |
| Kuwait | Saleh Ajeery (Note: Ajeery was born in the Emirate of Kuwait, a British protectorate.) | M | 23 June 1920 | 10 February 2022 | 101 years, 232 days |
| Laos | Khamtai Siphandone | M | 8 February 1924 | 2 April 2025 | 101 years, 53 days |
| Latvia | Margaret Romans (Note: Born in Latvia, which was then a part of the Russian Empire.) (died in Canada) | F | 16 March 1912 | 25 October 2025 | 113 years, 223 days |
| Latvia | Lidija Karlsons | F | 30 May 1904 | 1 July 2017 | 113 years, 32 days |
| Latvia | Andrejs Krūkliņš (Note: Born in Riga, which was then in a part of the Russian Empire. It is now the capital of Latvia.) | M | 10 January 1891 | 30 November 2001 | 110 years, 324 days |
| Lebanon | Francis Zouein (Note: Born in Lebanon, then a part of the Ottoman Empire.) (died in the U.S.) | M | 1 January 1911 | 24 January 2024 | 113 years, 23 days |
| Lebanon | Adma Tura (died in France) | F | 25 December 1906 | 3 September 2018 | 111 years, 252 days |
| Lesotho | Meshu Mokitimi | M | 15 March 1926 | Living | 100 years, 251 days |
| Liberia | Jessie Wah King | F | 25 May 1919 | 22 July 2020 | 101 years, 58 days |
| Libya | Mustafa Ben Halim (Note: Born in the Sultanate of Egypt, a United Kingdom protectorate until the British forced the Unilateral Declaration of Egyptian Independence in 1922.) (born in Egypt, died in the UAE) | M | 29 January 1921 | 7 December 2021 | 100 years, 312 days |
| Liechtenstein | Eduard von Falz-Fein (Note: Falz-Fein was born in the Kherson Governorate, then part of the Russian Empire, today an oblast of Ukraine claimed and partially controlled by Russia.) (born in Ukraine) | M | 14 September 1912 | 17 November 2018 | 106 years, 64 days |
| Liechtenstein | Maria Rheinberger-Schädler | F | 24 May 1883 | 17 May 1988 | 104 years, 359 days |
| Lithuania | Cacelie Bohler (Note: Bohler was born in Telšiai, then part of the Russian Empire, now in Lithuania.) (lives in the Germany) | F | 1 September 1911 | 10 November 2026 | 115 years, 70 days |
| Lithuania | Juzė Mauricienė (Note: Mauricienė was a native of Pjaulokiai in Šilutė District Municipality, a part of the Russian Empire; it is now located in Lithuania.) | F | 16 June 1909 | 30 April 2021 | 111 years, 318 days |
| Lithuania | Stasys Grigas (Note: Born in a part of the Russian Empire that is now located in Lithuania.) | M | 7 February 1905 | 30 October 2015 | 110 years, 265 days |
| Luxembourg | Germaine Litwinski-Kauffmann | F | 4 March 1908 | 17 January 2019 | 110 years, 319 days |
| Luxembourg | Jean Ley | M | 10 February 1903 | 20 February 2013 | 110 years, 10 days |
| Madagascar | Calvin Tsiebo (Note: born in French Madagascar, which gained independence in 1960.) | M | 12 July 1902 | 2008 | 106 years, 142 days to 106 years, 172 days |
| Madagascar | Lucie Tincres (died in Réunion) | M | 28 November 1920 | 13 December 2024 | 104 years, 15 days |
| Malawi | Learnard Muocha (Note: Born in British protectorate of Nyasaland which is now the independent country of Malawi.) | M | 1911 | 24 July 2015 | 104 years, 0 days to 104 years, 204 days (Note: Muocha's exactly date of birth is uncertain, but he was at least 104 at the time of his death in 2015.) |
| Malaysia | Annamah Abukutty (Note: Abukutty was born in Thachambadi, Tiruvannamalai, British India.) (born in India) | F | 31 March 1911 | 1 June 2022 | 111 years, 62 days |
| Malaysia | Choon Law (Note: Born in the colony of British Malaya, it is now part of independent Malaysia.) (died in Canada) | M | 6 March 1915 | 4 September 2020 | 105 years, 182 days |
| Malaysia | Oon Chiew Seng (died in Singapore) | F | 26 October 1916 | 31 March 2022 | 105 years, 156 days |
| Malaysia | Lim Kean Chye | M | 22 December 1919 | 7 June 2023 | 103 years, 167 days |
| Maldives | Ali Hussain (Note: Hussain was born in the British protectorate of the Maldives, it is now an independent country.) | M | 14 June 1913 | 5 August 2023 | 110 years, 52 days |
| Mali | Kaba Doumbia (Note: Doumbia was born in the French Sudan, it is now an independent country of Mali.) | M | 1920 | 26 Apr 2021 | 100 years, 238 days to 100 years, 364 days (Note: Doumbia's exactly date of birth is uncertain, but he was at least 101 at the time of his death in 2021.) |
| Malta | Maria Farrugia (Note: Born in Malta, then a British colony.) | F | 7 March 1912 | 23 December 2024 | 112 years, 291 days |
| Mauritania | Murabit al-Hajj (Note: Born in a part of the French Equatorial Africa colony which is now the independent country of Mauritania.) | M | 1913 | 17 July 2018 | 104 years, 198 days to 105 years, 197 days |
| Mauritius | Suzanne Jacquet (Note: Born in Mauritius, which was at that time a British crown colony, it is now an independent country.) (died in France) | F | 22 April 1912 | 10 November 2023 | 111 years, 202 days |
| Mauritius | Kewal Parsad Bisnauthsing | M | 10 October 1909 | 6 April 2020 | 110 years, 179 days |
| Mauritius | Irlande Richard | F | 14 June 1914 | 6 August 2024 | 110 years, 53 days |
| Mexico | Dominga Velasco (died in the U.S.) | F | 12 May 1901 | 11 October 2015 | 114 years, 152 days |
| Mexico | Sofia Mendoza Valencia | F | 27 March 1907 | 21 August 2021 | 114 years, 147 days |
| Mexico | Mauro Ambriz Tapia | M | 21 November 1897 | 18 April 2011 | 113 years, 148 days |
| Moldova | Goldie Steinberg (Note: Steinberg was born in Kishinev, which was then a city in the Russian Empire; it is now Chișinău, the capital of Moldova.) (died in the U.S.) | F | 30 October 1900 | 16 August 2015 | 114 years, 290 days |
| Moldova | Alexandra Dolghier (Note: Dolghier was born in Slobozia Noua, which was then in the Russian Empire; it is now Moldova.) | F | 26 March 1912 | 17 January 2023 | 110 years, 297 days |
| Moldova | Constantin Cojocari (Note: Born in Bessarabia when it was united with Romania.) | M | 2 February 1919 | 5 June 2025 | 106 years, 123 days |
| Monaco | Louis Vatrican | M | 7 May 1904 | June 7, 2007 | 103 years, 31 days |
| Mongolia | Luvsanjamtsyn Tsogzolmaa | F | 15 June 1924 | Living | 102 years, 159 days |
| Montenegro | Zenepe Pirani (died in Albania) | F | 10 May 1910 | 5 July 2021 | 111 years, 56 days |
| Montenegro | Jovan Jovanović (died in Bosnia and Herzegovina) | M | 16 September 1906 | 1 October 2016 | 110 years, 15 days |
| Montenegro | Fahrija Mučić (Note: Born in the Principality of Montenegro, it is now Montenegro.) | F | 5 September 1902 | 16 August 2012 | 109 years, 346 days |
| Montenegro | Božo Čolović | M | 7 January 1909 | 6 December 2018 | 109 years, 333 days |
| Morocco | Consuelo Moreno-López (Note: Born in a Spanish-influenced area of the Sultanate of Morocco.) (died in the U.S.) | F | 5 February 1893 | 13 November 2004 | 111 years, 282 days |
| Morocco | Mohamed Cherkaoui (Note: Born in the french protectorate area in Oued Zem) | M | 5 March 1921 | 31 December 2022 | 101 years, 301 days |
| Mozambique | Branca Pinto de Carvalho (Note: Pinto de Carvalho was born in Mozambique, which was at that time a Portuguese colony.) (died in Portugal) | F | 27 March 1914 | 30 March 2024 | 110 years, 3 days |
| Mozambique | Júlio Duarte Langa | M | 27 October 1927 | 3 August 2026 | 98 years, 280 days |
| Myanmar | Grace Greenwood (Note: Born in Burma, now known as Myanmar, under British control) (died in the UK) | F | 9 April 1916 | 7 January 2026 | 109 years, 273 days |
| Myanmar | Daw Kyan | F | 1 July 1918 | 16 November 2019 | 101 years, 138 days |
| Namibia | Peter Pauly (born in Germany) | M | 20 September 1917 | 16 July 2021 | 103 years, 299 days |
| Nepal | Satya Mohan Joshi | M | 12 May 1919 | 16 October 2022 | 103 years, 157 days |
| Netherlands | Hendrikje van Andel-Schipper | F | 29 June 1890 | 30 August 2005 | 115 years, 62 days |
| Netherlands | John Huang (born in Vietnam) | M | 1 February 1914 | 13 February 2026 | 112 years, 12 days |
| Netherlands | Jan Pieter Bos | M | 12 July 1891 | 15 December 2002 | 111 years, 156 days |
| New Zealand | Florence Finch (born in the UK) | F | 22 December 1893 | 10 April 2007 | 113 years, 109 days |
| New Zealand | Aileen Kars | F | 12 September 1913 | Living | 113 years, 70 days |
| New Zealand | Arthur Bates (born in the UK) | M | 25 November 1881 | 19 January 1992 | 110 years, 55 days |
| New Zealand | Lloyd Geering | M | 26 February 1918 | 5 November 2026 | 108 years, 252 days |
| Nicaragua | Mercedes Brenes Estrada | F | 15 August 1910 | 5 July 2024 | 113 years, 325 days |
| Nicaragua | Julian Miguel Ramos Zapata | M | 6 September 1906 | 24 August 2015 | 108 years, 352 days |
| Nigeria | Akintola Williams (Note: Born in Colonial Nigeria) | M | 9 August 1919 | 11 September 2023 | 104 years, 33 days |
| North Korea | Kim Hyung-suk (Note: Born in Korea under Japanese rule.) (lives in South Korea) | M | 23 April 1920 | Living | 106 years, 212 days |
| North Korea | Ri Yong-suk | F | 17 April 1916 | November 2021 | 105 years, 198 days to 105 years, 227 days |
| North Korea | Kim Yong-ju | M | 21 September 1920 | 13 December 2021 | 101 years, 83 days |
| North Macedonia | Elizabeth Kimoff (Note: Kimoff was born in the village of Kolésino, then in the Sanjak of Salonica of the Ottoman Empire; it is now Kolešino in Novo Selo Municipality, southeastern North Macedonia.) (died in Canada) | F | 20 November 1904 | 15 October 2015 | 110 years, 329 days |
| North Macedonia | Fikrije Loki (born in Kosovo) | F | 10 January 1914 | 13 September 2024 | 110 years, 247 days |
| North Macedonia | Zaide Sali (Note: Sali was born in Čučer-Sandevo Municipality, then part of the Ottoman Empire, it is now in the northern part of North Macedonia.) | F | 17 May 1902 | 24 December 2011 | 109 years, 221 days |
| North Macedonia | Ramiz Selmani (Note: Selmani was born in the Macedonian part of the former Kingdom of Serbia, which is today North Macedonia.) | M | 10 October 1914 | 2 July 2023 | 108 years, 265 days |
| Norway | Maren Bolette Torp (Note: Torp and Smith-Johannsen were born in Norway, then a part of Sweden–Norway; it is now an independent country.) | F | 21 December 1876 | 20 February 1989 | 112 years, 61 days |
| Norway | Herman Smith-Johannsen | M | 15 June 1875 | 5 January 1987 | 111 years, 204 days |
| Pakistan | Samuel Martin Burke (Note: Born in the British-ruled Raj of India, which included the entirety of today's Pakistan.) | M | 3 July 1906 | 9 October 2010 | 104 years, 98 days |
| Palestine | Hasan Karmi (Note: Born in the British mandate of Palestine.) (died in the Jordan) | M | 1905 | 5 May 2007 | 101 years, 125 days to 102 years, 124 days |
| Panama | Guillermina Acosta Bilbao (Note: Born in Panama, which was then a part of Colombia.) | F | 27 November 1901 | 13 February 2017 | 115 years, 78 days |
| Panama | Macario Barría Cárdena | M | 10 March 1913 | 10 December 2024 | 111 years, 275 days |
| Paraguay | Casilda Benegas Gallego (died in Argentina) | F | 8 April 1907 | 28 June 2022 | 115 years, 81 days |
| Paraguay | Silverio Pereira Ayala | M | 11 June 1906 | 30 May 2018 | 111 years, 353 days |
| Paraguay | Brigida Ruiz de Cuevas | F | 8 October 1907 | 1 October 2018 | 110 years, 358 days |
| Peru | Horacio Celi Mendoza | M | 3 January 1897 | 25 September 2011 | 114 years, 265 days |
| Peru | S. R. C. | F | 22 May 1909 | 21 July 2020 | 111 years, 60 days |
| Philippines | Carmen G. Dono | F | 14 March 1891 | 18 November 2009 | 118 years, 249 days |
| Philippines | Tomas Andal (Note: Born in the Philippines, which was then a colony of the United States.) | M | 12 January 1885 | 11 January 2000 | 114 years, 364 days |
| Poland | Tekla Juniewicz (Note: Juniewicz was born in Krupsko, which was then part of Austria-Hungary; it is now located in Lviv Oblast, Ukraine.) (born in Ukraine) | F | 10 June 1906 | 19 August 2022 | 116 years, 70 days |
| Poland | Augusta Holtz (died in the U.S.) | F | 3 August 1871 | 21 October 1986 | 115 years, 79 days |
| Poland | Gustav Gerneth (died in Germany) | M | 15 October 1905 | 21 October 2019 | 114 years, 6 days |
| Poland | Antonina Partyka | F | 22 September 1908 | 17 November 2020 | 112 years, 56 days |
| Poland | Stanisław Kowalski | M | 14 April 1910 | 5 April 2022 | 111 years, 356 days |
| Portugal | Maria de Jesus | F | 10 September 1893 | 2 January 2009 | 115 years, 114 days |
| Portugal | Augusto Moreira de Oliveira | M | 6 October 1896 | 13 February 2009 | 112 years, 130 days |
| Romania | Ilie Ciocan | M | 10 June 1913 | 27 May 2026 | 112 years, 351 days |
| Romania | Istvánné Fejes (died in Hungary) | F | 15 February 1911 | 17 December 2022 | 111 years, 305 days |
| Romania | Paladia Noja (Note: Born in the Lands of the Holy Hungarian Crown of Austria-Hungary, now in Romania.) (born in Austria-Hungary) | F | 20 July 1915 | 14 September 2026 | 111 years, 56 days |
| Romania | Maria Tudor | F | 21 September 1905 | 22 March 2016 | 110 years, 183 days |
| Russia | Pelageya Zakurdayeva (Note: Born in a part of the Russian Empire that is now in Russia.) | F | 6 June 1886 | 13 March 2005 | 118 years, 280 days |
| Russia | Vagislav Charakh | M | 17 December 1910 | 6 April 2024 | 113 years, 111 days |
| Rwanda | Venant Ntabomvura (Note: Born in the Mandate of Ruanda-Urundi.) | M | 4 April 1926 | Living | 100 years, 231 days |
| Saint Kitts and Nevis | Bernice Sebastian (Note: Born in Saint Kitts and Nevis, which was at the time of their birth part of the colony of the British Leeward Islands; it is now an independent country.) (died in the U.S.) | F | 21 September 1913 | 3 January 2026 | 112 years, 104 days |
| Saint Kitts and Nevis | Lilian Jeffers | F | 10 February 1899 | 1 March 2007 | 108 years, 19 days |
| Saint Kitts and Nevis | Jacob Warner (died in the U.S. Virgin Islands) | M | 18 September 1907 | 20 October 2014 | 107 years, 32 days |
| Saint Kitts and Nevis | Herman Ward | M | 23 September 1908 | 3 October 2014 | 106 years, 10 days |
| Saint Lucia | Christina Cetoute (Note: Born in a part of the colony of the British Windward Islands, which is now the independent country of Saint Lucia.) | F | 9 June 1903 | 24 August 2016 | 113 years, 76 days |
| Saint Lucia | Annius Isidore Sonny | M | 3 September 1911 | 8 May 2020 | 108 years, 248 days |
| Saint Vincent and the Grenadines | Edith Etheline Young (Note: Born in a part of the colony of the British Windward Islands, which is now the independent country of Saint Vincent and the Grenadines.) | F | 20 July 1908 | 28 November 2018 | 110 years, 131 days |
| Saint Vincent and the Grenadines | Frederick Beache | M | 9 February 1905 | 28 July 2013 | 108 years, 169 days |
| São Tomé and Príncipe | Maria Helena Aguiar (Note: Aguiar was born in São Tomé and Príncipe, which was at that time a Portuguese colony.) (died in Portugal) | F | 2 November 1913 | 7 October 2025 | 111 years, 339 days |
| Senegal | Amadou-Mahtar M'Bow (Note: Born in the French West African Colony) | M | 20 March 1921 | 24 September 2024 | 103 years, 188 days |
| Serbia | Veronika Zsilinszki (died in Hungary) | F | 4 February 1908 | 20 April 2021 | 113 years, 75 days |
| Serbia | Jelisaveta Veljković (born in Croatia) | F | 18 July 1904 | 20 October 2016 | 112 years, 94 days |
| Serbia | Jovo Latinović (born in Bosnia and Herzegovina) | M | 19 August 1901 | 15 April 2011 | 109 years, 239 days |
| Serbia | Antonije Mladenović (Note: Mladenović died in the Socialist Republic of Serbia, part of SFR Yugoslavia.) | M | 30 June 1860 | 29 December 1969 | 109 years, 182 days |
| Serbia | Kostadinka Momirović | F | 6 March 1900 | 8 July 2009 | 109 years, 124 days |
| Seychelles | Nancy Marie (Note: Marie was born in Seychelles, which was at that time a British colony; it is now an independent country.) | F | 26 January 1909 | 11 May 2021 | 112 years, 105 days |
| Sierra Leone | Alhaji Mohamed Sallieu Thomas (Note: Born in the Sierra Leone Colony and Protectorate which became independent in 1961.) | M | 22 October 1920 | 7 January 2021 | 100 years, 77 days |
| Singapore | Teresa Hsu (Note: Born under the Qing Dynasty of Imperial China, which is now in the People's Republic of China.) (born in China) | F | 7 July 1898 | 7 December 2011 | 113 years, 153 days |
| Singapore | Ng Ah Kiang | M | 1 October 1913 | 30 July 2022 | 108 years, 302 days |
| Singapore | Ng Lan Keng | F | 1 January 1905 | 7 October 2012 | 107 years, 280 days |
| Slovakia | Justina Sáblíkova (Note: Born in Bratislava, which was then a part of Austria-Hungary: it is now located in the Slovakia.) (died in Czech Republic) | F | 23 March 1914 | 6 October 2026 | 112 years, 197 days |
| Slovakia | Jozef Suchár (Note: Suchár was born in Slovakia, which was then in the Hungarian part of Austria-Hungary. He died in the Slovak part of Czechoslovakia.) | M | 16 February 1857 | 11 August 1967 | 110 years, 176 days |
| Slovakia | Katarína Čavojova (Note: Born in Slovakia, which was then in the Hungarian part of Austria-Hungary.) | F | 11 October 1881 | 30 December 1991 | 110 years, 80 days |
| Slovenia | Julijana Zakrajšek (Note: Born in Slovenia, then a part of Austria-Hungary.) | F | 28 October 1912 | 22 July 2024 | 111 years, 268 days |
| Slovenia | Niko Dragoš | M | 27 August 1907 | 31 March 2018 | 110 years, 216 days |
| Somalia | Ali Mohamed Hirabe (Note: Born in the coastal town of Adale in Middle Shabelle, Italian Somaliland which is now the independent country of Somalia, disputed by the partially recognised Somaliland.) (died in Canada) | M | 1925 | 1 December 2025 | 100 years, 0 days to 100 years, 334 days (Note: Hirabe's exactly date of birth is uncertain, but he was at least 100 at the time of his death in 2025.) |
| Somalia | Sheikh Mukhtar Mohamed Hussein (Note: Born in Italian Somaliland which is now the independent country of Somalia, disputed by the partially recognised Somaliland.) (died in Kenya) | M | 1912 | 12 June 2012 | 100 years, 0 days to 100 years, 163 days (Note: Hussein's exactly date of birth is uncertain, but he was at least 100 at the time of his death in 2012.) |
| South Africa | Rosalie Wolpe (Note: Born in the British Transvaal Colony, now part of the Republic of South Africa.) | F | 25 August 1909 | 30 December 2021 | 112 years, 127 days |
| South Africa | Jan Duminy | M | 13 November 1904 | 11 August 2014 | 109 years, 271 days |
| South Korea | Masao Kōge (died in Japan) | F | 30 April 1913 | 20 April 2025 | 111 years, 355 days |
| South Korea | Ja Hyung Lee (Note: Born in the last days of the Korean Empire, before the country became a direct Japanese colony.) (died in Canada) | M | 27 August 1910 | 12 February 2022 | 111 years, 169 days |
| South Korea | Lee Eul-sik (Note: Born in the Korean kingdom called Great Joseon.) | M | 2 March 1897 | 1 May 2007 | 110 years, 60 days |
| South Korea | Choi Ae-gi | F | 18 February 1895 | 25 January 2005 | 109 years, 342 days |
| South Sudan | Joseph Lagu (Note: Born in the condominium of Anglo-Egyptian Sudan, controlled by the United Kingdom and the Sultanate of Egypt.) | M | 26 November 1929 | 26 October 2026 | 96 years, 334 days |
| Spain | Maria Branyas (born in the U.S.) | F | 4 March 1907 | 19 August 2024 | 117 years, 168 days |
| Spain | Ana María Vela Rubio | F | 29 October 1901 | 15 December 2017 | 116 years, 47 days |
| Spain | Joan Riudavets | M | 15 December 1889 | 5 March 2004 | 114 years, 81 days |
| Sri Lanka | Bolanda Hakuru Meniel (Note: Born in the British colony of the Island of Ceylon and its Territories and Dependencies, which is today the independent country of Sri Lanka.) | M | 4 June 1915 | Living | 111 years, 170 days |
| Sri Lanka | Punchage Kalumenike | F | 4 July 1912 | 13 July 2026 | 114 years, 9 days |
| Sudan | Babiker Awadalla (died in Ireland) | M | 2 March 1917 | 17 January 2019 | 101 years, 321 days |
| Sudan | Abdel Halim Mohamed | M | 10 April 1910 | 16 April 2009 | 99 years, 6 days |
| Suriname | Koffie Dosoe (Note: Born in Suriname, then a Dutch colony.) (died in French Guiana) | M | 21 May 1912 | 19 July 2022 | 110 years, 59 days |
| Suriname | Louise Gummels | F | 16 October 1912 | 7 April 2022 | 109 years, 173 days |
| Suriname | Emanuel Pinas | M | 15 February 1907 | 14 November 2013 | 106 years, 272 days |
| Sweden | Astrid Zachrison | F | 15 May 1895 | 15 May 2008 | 113 years, 0 days |
| Sweden | Carl Mattsson | M | 7 March 1908 | 24 July 2019 | 111 years, 139 days |
| Switzerland | Rosa Rein (Note: Rein was born in Dzietzkowitz, near Myslowitz, which was then part of the German Empire. It is now in Poland.) (born in Germany) | F | 24 March 1897 | 14 February 2010 | 112 years, 327 days |
| Switzerland | Alice Schaufelberger | F | 11 January 1908 | 16 November 2020 | 112 years, 310 days |
| Switzerland | Joseph Wagner | M | 1 January 1848 | 30 December 1958 | 110 years, 363 days |
| Syria | Marthe Hallak (Note: Hallak was born in Syria, which was at that time part of the Ottoman Empire.) (died in France) | F | 20 July 1913 | 15 November 2023 | 110 years, 118 days |
| Syria | Jassim | M | 5 January 1922 | Living | 104 years, 320 days (Note: Jassim's exactly date of birth is uncertain, but he was at least 103 as of 16 May 2025.) |
| Taiwan | Lin Zhaozhi (Note: Lin and Huang were born in a part of the Empire of Japan that is now in the Republic of China (Taiwan).) | F | 17 January 1900 | 11 December 2013 | 113 years, 328 days |
| Taiwan | Yu Te-Hsin (Note: Born in a declared part of the Republic of China, under the Beiyang Government, that is now China.) (born in China) | M | 17 March 1915 | Living | 111 years, 249 days |
| Taiwan | Huang Decheng | M | 14 November 1913 | 20 November 2023 | 110 years, 6 days |
| Tajikistan | Fotima Salimova (Note: Born in a part of Russian Turkestan that is now Tajikistan.) | F | 20 January 1913 | Living | 113 years, 305 days |
| Tajikistan | Rashid Karimov | M | 9 May 1912 | 24 August 2025 | 113 years, 107 days |
| Tanzania | George Rother (Note: Rother was born in Tanzania, which was part of the colony of German East Africa.) (died in the U.S) | M | 16 February 1911 | 18 May 2018 | 107 years, 91 days |
| Tanzania | David Musuguri (Note: Musuguri was born in the Tanganyika Territory, when it was under British military rule immediately after World War I.) | M | 4 January 1920 | 29 October 2024 | 104 years, 299 days |
| Thailand | Fong Jitsut | F | 15 April 1903 | 27 September 2015 | 113 years, 165 days |
| Thailand | Phan Wannamethee | M | 30 January 1923 | Living | 103 years, 295 days |
| Togo | Assaba Thecla Kponton (Note: Born in southern Togoland under the German Empire which was at the time occupied by the French.) (died in France) | F | 26 December 1915 | 10 March 2018 | 102 years, 74 days |
| Trinidad and Tobago | Juliana Boland (Note: Born in a part of the British West Indies, which is now the independent country Trinidad and Tobago.) | F | 25 April 1904 | 25 January 2016 | 111 years, 275 days |
| Trinidad and Tobago | Elbert Blades | M | 7 April 1902 | 16 November 2012 | 110 years, 223 days |
| Tunisia | Helene Malfuson (Note: Born in Tunisia, which was at that time a French protectorate.) (died in France) | F | 29 June 1914 | 4 October 2026 | 112 years, 97 days |
| Tunisia | Gino Migliore (died in Switzerland) | M | 3 June 1913 | 22 January 2022 | 108 years, 233 days |
| Tunisia | Hajj Hassan bin Ahmed Al-Anizi | M | 30 April 1919 | 22 November 2024 | 105 years, 206 days |
| Turkey | Lucy Mirigian (died in the U.S.) | F | 15 August 1906 | 12 February 2021 | 114 years, 181 days |
| Turkey | Hanife Gürhan (Note: Gürhan was born Çorum of the Ottoman Empire, today part of Turkey.) | F | 9 June 1910 | 2 April 2024 | 113 years, 298 days |
| Turkey | Frank Simes (Note: Simes was born in Aydın, in the Aidin vilayet of the Ottoman Empire, today part of Turkey.) (died in the UK) | M | 10 July 1905 | 18 September 2016 | 111 years, 70 days |
| Turkey | Yakup Satar (Note: Satar was born in Crimea, then in the Russian Empire, today a disputed area of Ukraine claimed and controlled by Russia.) (born in Ukraine) | M | 11 March 1898 | 2 April 2008 | 110 years, 22 days |
| Tuvalu | Vaisamoa Namoa (Note: Namoa was born in the Ellice Islands group of the colony of the Gilbert and Ellice Islands, the Elice Islands are now part of the independent country of Tuvalu.) (died in New Zealand) | F | 19 July 1928 | 15 July 2024 | 95 years, 362 days |
| Uganda | Mzee Canon Kolliab Maswere (Note: was born in Uganda when it was a British protectorate.) | M | 27 July 1917 | 17 June 2026 | 108 years, 325 days |
| Uganda | Florence Alice Lubega | F | 5 November 1917 | 28 October 2021 | 103 years, 357 days |
| Ukraine | Tekla Juniewicz (died in Poland) | F | 10 June 1906 | 19 August 2022 | 116 years, 70 days |
| Ukraine | Eufrosiya Tereshkova (Note: Tereshkova was born in the of the Russian Empire, it is now in Ukraine.) | F | 29 December 1904 | 20 December 2019 | 114 years, 356 days |
| Ukraine | Mikhail Krichevsky (Note: Krichevsky was born in the Poltava Governorate of the Russian Empire, it is now in Ukraine.) | M | 9 March 1897 | 26 December 2008 | 111 years, 292 days |
| United Arab Emirates | Rashid Hamdoon Saeed Al Naqbi | M | 1 June 1904 | 15 February 2012 | 107 years, 259 days |
| United Kingdom | Ethel Caterham | F | 21 August 1909 | Living | 117 years, 92 days |
| United Kingdom | Henry Allingham | M | 6 June 1896 | 18 July 2009 | 113 years, 42 days |
| United States | Sarah Knauss | F | 24 September 1880 | 30 December 1999 | 119 years, 97 days |
| United States | Christian Mortensen (born in Denmark) | M | 16 August 1882 | 25 April 1998 | 115 years, 252 days |
| United States | Walter Breuning | M | 21 September 1896 | 14 April 2011 | 114 years, 205 days |
| Uruguay | Jacinta Silva | F | 15 May 1904 | 29 July 2016 | 112 years, 75 days |
| Uruguay | Félix Ortiz Galbán | M | 20 November 1911 | 18 March 2022 | 110 years, 118 days |
| Vatican City | Corrado Bafile (born in Italy) | M | 4 July 1903 | 3 February 2005 | 101 years, 214 days |
| Venezuela | Juan Vicente Pérez | M | 27 May 1909 | 2 April 2024 | 114 years, 311 days |
| Venezuela | Isabel Alvarado López | F | 9 August 1911 | 12 December 2023 | 112 years, 125 days |
| Vietnam | John Huang (died in the Netherlands) | M | 1 February 1914 | 13 February 2026 | 112 years, 12 days |
| Vietnam | Rosa Nguyễn Thị Kính (Note: Born in a part of French Indochina that is now in Vietnam.) | F | 1 January 1916 | 17 April 2025 | 109 years, 106 days |
| Vietnam | Hữu Ngọc (Note: Born in North Vietnam, then part of French Indochina, today part of Vietnam.) | M | 22 December 1918 | 2 May 2025 | 106 years, 131 days |
| Yemen | Abdul Salam Sabrah | M | 1 January 1912 | 2 February 2012 | 100 years, 32 days |
| Zambia | Peter Chanda Kasolo (Note: Kasolo was born in Northern Rhodesia, which is now the independent country of Zambia.) | M | 30 June 1925 | Living | 101 years, 144 days |
| Zimbabwe | Paul Mwazha (Note: Born in Southern Rhodesia, now known as Zimbabwe) | M | 25 October 1918 | 20 November 2025 | 107 years, 26 days |

=== Territorial and overseas regions record holders ===
Below is a list of oldest people in the territories of selected countries. Entries for living people are rendered by

Living

Unvalidated.

| Country | Territory | Name | Sex | Birth date | Death date | Age |
|---|---|---|---|---|---|---|
| China | Hong Kong | Nicholas Kao Se Tseien (born in China) | M | 15 January 1897 | 11 December 2007 | 110 years, 330 days |
| China | Hong Kong | Jin Suwen | F | 1 July 1899 | 17 December 2009 | 110 years, 169 days |
| Denmark | Faroe Islands | Theodor Thomassen | M | 28 October 1908 | 9 March 2016 | 107 years, 133 days |
| Denmark | Faroe Islands | Kala Jensen | F | 3 September 1915 | 1 February 2022 | 106 years, 151 days |
| Denmark | Greenland | Agnethe Fencker | F | 24 October 1910 | 7 April 2013 | 102 years, 165 days |
| Denmark | Greenland | Anton Geisler | M | 21 February 1919 | 28 February 2021 | 102 years, 7 days |
| Finland | Åland | Anna Hagman | F | 27 December 1895 | 18 April 2006 | 110 years, 112 days |
| Finland | Åland | Viktor Mattsson | M | 13 January 1880 | 15 May 1985 | 105 years, 122 days |
| France | French Guiana | Eudoxie Baboul | F | 1 October 1901 | 1 July 2016 | 114 years, 274 days |
| France | French Guiana | Koffie Dosoe (Note: Born in Suriname, then a Dutch colony.) (born in Suriname) | M | 21 May 1912 | 19 July 2022 | 110 years, 59 days |
| France | French Guiana | Camille Othily | M | 26 May 1910 | 12 February 2018 | 107 years, 262 days |
| France | Guadeloupe | Luce Maced (died in Martinique) | F | 2 May 1886 | 25 February 2000 | 113 years, 299 days |
| France | Guadeloupe | Émilienne Bécarmin | F | 4 June 1911 | 15 January 2025 | 113 years, 225 days |
| France | Guadeloupe | Julien Emile Arsene | M | 18 May 1911 | 12 June 2021 | 110 years, 25 days |
| France | Martinique | Luce Maced (born in Guadeloupe) | F | 2 May 1886 | 25 February 2000 | 113 years, 299 days |
| France | Martinique | Julie Montabord | F | 17 April 1906 | 18 July 2019 | 113 years, 92 days |
| France | Martinique | Jules Théobald | M | 17 April 1909 | 5 October 2021 | 112 years, 171 days |
| France | New Caledonia | Marie-Louise Lhuillier | F | 26 June 1895 | 28 December 2007 | 112 years, 185 days |
| France | Réunion | Marie-Isabelle Diaz (born in Algeria) | F | 22 February 1898 | 29 October 2011 | 113 years, 249 days |
| France | Réunion | Julia Sinédia-Cazour | F | 12 July 1892 | 6 October 2005 | 113 years, 86 days |
| France | Réunion | Jean-Clementis Amano | M | 7 October 1908 | 15 June 2019 | 110 years, 251 days |
| France | Saint Barthélemy | Eugénie Blanchard | F | 16 February 1896 | 4 November 2010 | 114 years, 261 days |
| Netherlands | Aruba | Maria Luisa Benjamin (born in Saint Kitts and Nevis) | F | 23 July 1910 | 1 November 2021 | 111 years, 101 days |
| Netherlands | Aruba | Maria Samson-Leer (died in Curaçao) | F | 1 February 1906 | 22 December 2015 | 109 years, 324 days |
| Netherlands | Aruba | Annette Maduro-Lampe | F | 26 May 1909 | 16 August 2018 | 109 years, 82 days |
| Netherlands | Aruba | James Williams (born in Suriname) | M | 22 December 1915 | 18 June 2023 | 107 years, 178 days |
| Netherlands | Aruba | Frans Croes | M | 10 May 1918 | 11 December 2023 | 105 years, 215 days |
| Netherlands | Bonaire | Mona Pourier | F | 15 March 1913 | 24 April 2019 | 106 years, 40 days |
| Netherlands | Bonaire | Ricardo Bernardo Statie (died in Aruba) | M | 3 April 1914 | 30 May 2019 | 105 years, 57 days |
| Netherlands | Curaçao | Anna Helene Nouel (died in Venezuela) | F | 22 February 1910 | 4 September 2020 | 110 years, 195 days |
| Netherlands | Curaçao | Maria Samson-Leer (born in Aruba) | F | 1 February 1906 | 22 December 2015 | 109 years, 324 days |
| Netherlands | Curaçao | Luna Kleinmoedig | F | 19 October 1907 | 7 March 2017 | 109 years, 139 days |
| Netherlands | Curaçao | Orsilio Pablo Pinedo | M | 7 July 1913 | 12 January 2020 | 106 years, 189 days |
| Portugal | Azores | Julia Rose (died in the U.S.) | F | 27 January 1902 | 21 September 2012 | 110 years, 238 days |
| Portugal | Azores | Idalina Moniz | F | 28 October 1916 | Living | 110 years, 24 days |
| Portugal | Azores | Joaquim Maria da Costa | M | 6 February 1914 | 16 September 2019 | 105 years, 222 days |
| Portugal | Madeira | José Martins | M | 7 March 1912 | 14 May 2022 | 110 years, 68 days |
| Portugal | Madeira | Maria Pestana Franca | F | 6 October 1915 | 21 September 2023 | 107 years, 350 days |
| Spain | Canary Islands | Rosalba Castro Bello | F | 15 February 1907 | 17 July 2017 | 110 years, 152 days |
| United Kingdom | Anguilla | Ursilla Connor | F | 29 August 1913 | 14 September 2022 | 109 years, 16 days |
| United Kingdom | Anguilla | Charlie Gumbs | M | 26 August 1910 | 29 April 2014 | 103 years, 246 days |
| United Kingdom | Bermuda | Myrtle Edness | F | 17 July 1914 | 26 January 2023 | 108 years, 193 days |
| United Kingdom | Bermuda | Lefroy Brownlow Place | M | 24 July 1916 | 23 July 2024 | 107 years, 365 days |
| United Kingdom | British Virgin Islands | Eliza Turnbull | F | 6 October 1900 | 17 October 2010 | 110 years, 11 days |
| United Kingdom | British Virgin Islands | William Rhymer | M | 9 November 1916 | 23 October 2021 | 104 years, 348 days |
| United Kingdom | Guernsey | Margaret Ann Neve | F | 18 May 1792 | 4 April 1903 | 110 years, 321 days |
| United Kingdom | Isle of Man | Doris Watkins | F | 25 November 1902 | 11 November 2011 | 108 years, 351 days |
| United Kingdom | Isle of Man | John Twibell | M | 30 March 1904 | 14 January 2011 | 106 years, 290 days |
| United Kingdom | Jersey | Beryl Ada Le Gros | F | 30 August 1910 | 31 January 2019 | 108 years, 154 days |
| United Kingdom | Montserrat | Isley Bobb | M | 23 June 1893 | 7 November 2003 | 110 years, 137 days |
| United Kingdom | Montserrat | Josephine Ponde | F | 13 June 1908 | 12 September 2017 | 109 years, 91 days |
| United States | Puerto Rico | Emiliano Mercado del Toro (Note: Puerto Rico was at that time a part of the Spanish Empire. It is now in the United States.) | M | 21 August 1891 | 24 January 2007 | 115 years, 156 days |
| United States | Puerto Rico | Antonia Gerena Rivera (died in the continental U.S.) | F | 19 May 1900 | 2 June 2015 | 115 years, 14 days |
| United States | Puerto Rico | Ramona Trinidad Iglesias-Jordan | F | 1 September 1889 | 29 May 2004 | 114 years, 271 days |
| United States | U.S. Virgin Islands | Ursula Krigger (Note: The U.S. Virgin Islands were at that time the Danish West Indies, a Danish colony. They are now in the United States.) | F | 22 April 1902 | 10 September 2015 | 113 years, 141 days |
| United States | U.S. Virgin Islands | Jacob Warner (born in Saint Kitts and Nevis) | M | 18 September 1907 | 20 October 2014 | 107 years, 32 days |
| United States | U.S. Virgin Islands | John Tranberg | M | 17 April 1916 | 22 August 2019 | 103 years, 127 days |

== Oldest living by country ==
This is a list of the oldest living people by country and lists the oldest people confirmed to be alive in the past year, sorted by country. Those born in one country, but who later moved to another are specifically noted.

=== Independent states ===
Unvalidated

| Country | Name | Sex | Birth date | Age as of 21 November 2026 |
|---|---|---|---|---|
| Afghanistan | Mohammad Hasan Sharq | M | 17 July 1925 | 101 years, 127 days |
| Albania | Gjylo Karafili | F | 12 June 1918 | 108 years, 162 days |
| Albania | Ismet Elezi | M | 5 April 1920 | 106 years, 230 days |
| Antigua and Barbuda | Hermena Goodwin | F | 10 January 1921 | 105 years, 315 days |
| Argentina | Dionisio Juarez | M | 9 October 1918 | 108 years, 43 days |
| Australia | Ken Weeks | M | 5 October 1913 | 113 years, 47 days |
| Australia | Dora Caverson (born in the UK) | F | 10 September 1914 | 112 years, 72 days |
| Barbados | Hermione Parris | F | 29 December 1916 | 109 years, 327 days |
| Barbados | John Foster | M | 30 August 1919 | 107 years, 83 days |
| Belarus | Anna Gromyko (Note: Born somewhere in the Russian Imperial Governorates of Vitebsk, Grodno, Mogilev, or Minsk, under Imperial German Army occupation, that are now in Belarus.) | F | 5 March 1918 | 108 years, 261 days |
| Belarus | Semyon Beresnev | M | 15 January 1920 | 106 years, 310 days |
| Belize | Cosme Duran | M | 27 September 1918 | 108 years, 55 days |
| Bhutan | Kesang Choden | F | 21 May 1930 | 96 years, 184 days |
| Bolivia | Estefania Claure Bejarano | F | 26 December 1916 | 109 years, 330 days |
| Bosnia and Herzegovina | Spasenija Kovačević (Note: Born in a part of the Kingdom of Serbs, Croats and Slovenes.) | F | 10 February 1920 | 106 years, 284 days |
| Brazil | Yolanda Beltrão de Azevedo | F | 13 January 1911 | 115 years, 312 days |
| Brazil | João Marinho Neto | M | 5 October 1912 | 114 years, 47 days |
| Brunei | Abdul Aziz Umar | M | 20 March 1936 | 90 years, 246 days |
| Bulgaria | Esme Mustafa | F | 2 May 1917 | 109 years, 203 days |
| Bulgaria | Todor Tsenov | M | 1 April 1921 | 105 years, 234 days |
| Cambodia | Dinoang Ring | F | 25 September 1915 | 111 years, 57 days |
| Cambodia | Khieu Samphan | M | 27 July 1931 | 95 years, 117 days |
| Canada | Katherine Baumchen (lives in the U.S.) | F | 10 February 1915 | 111 years, 284 days |
| Canada | Marie Rosa | F | 17 September 1915 | 111 years, 65 days |
| Canada | Joseph Mery Arthur (born in Haiti) | M | 7 July 1916 | 110 years, 137 days |
| Canada | Ted Price | M | 14 August 1916 | 110 years, 99 days |
| Central African Republic | Henri Maïdou (lives in France) | M | 14 February 1936 | 90 years, 280 days |
| Chile | Rosa Laura Torres Barra | F | 20 July 1913 | 113 years, 124 days |
| China | Yu Te-Hsin (lives in Taiwan) | M | 17 March 1915 | 111 years, 249 days |
| Colombia | Ana Faustina Tejada | F | 9 February 1915 | 111 years, 285 days |
| Costa Rica | Zoraida Montezuma | F | 31 October 1913 | 113 years, 21 days |
| Croatia | Hilda Hećej | F | 23 April 1918 | 108 years, 212 days |
| Croatia | Ivan Mišković | M | 24 October 1920 | 106 years, 28 days |
| Cuba | Rosa Julia Peña Hechavarría | F | 23 October 1914 | 112 years, 29 days |
| Cuba | Aniceto Santiesteban Álvarez | M | 3 April 1915 | 111 years, 232 days |
| Czech Republic | Karla Kočková (Note: Born in either Bohemia or Moravia, which were then a part of Austria-Hungary; they are now located in the Czech Republic.) | F | 25 December 1917 | 108 years, 331 days |
| Czech Republic | Antonín Šlenc (Note: Born in Central Bohemia which was then part of the First Czechoslovak Republic, it is now located in the Czech Republic.) | M | 28 September 1919 | 107 years, 54 days |
| Democratic Republic of the Congo | Luhembwe Alfani | M | 1922 or 1923 | 103 years, 14 days to 104 years, 13 days |
| Denmark | Kirsten Schwalbe | F | 10 March 1914 | 112 years, 256 days |
| Dominica | Edvira Anatol | F | 23 February 1921 | 105 years, 271 days |
| Dominican Republic | María Altagracia Antigua | F | 21 January 1915 | 111 years, 304 days |
| Dominican Republic | Marino Batista | M | 28 October 1916 | 110 years, 24 days |
| Ecuador | Josefina Tapia de Sarmiento | F | 10 January 1916 | 110 years, 315 days |
| Ecuador | Melitón Augusto Pihuave Cochea | M | 16 September 1916 | 110 years, 66 days |
| El Salvador | Eduviges de Jesús López | M | 19 October 1919 | 107 years, 33 days |
| Estonia | Lidia Saulep (Note: Born in a part of Estonia then under Imperial German occupation during World War I.) | F | 5 July 1918 | 108 years, 139 days |
| Finland | Eila Hukkanen (born in Russia) | F | 28 December 1917 | 108 years, 328 days |
| Finland | Ilmari Koppinen | M | 8 January 1918 | 108 years, 317 days |
| Finland | Helena Sulima | F | 16 February 1918 | 108 years, 278 days |
| France | Madeleine Dellamonica | F | 23 July 1912 | 114 years, 121 days |
| France | Jean Turco | M | 19 December 1917 | 108 years, 337 days |
| Germany | Ilse Neumann | F | 23 July 1914 | 112 years, 121 days |
| Germany | Hans-Georg Jakisch | M | 14 April 1918 | 108 years, 221 days |
| Ghana | Osman Nuhu Sharubutu | M | 23 April 1923 | 103 years, 212 days |
| Greece | Paressa Orfanidou (Note: Born in a part of the Ottoman Empire that is now in Turkey.) (born in Turkey) | F | 18 September 1915 | 111 years, 64 days |
| Grenada | Judith Mends (lives in the U.S.) | F | 21 June 1916 | 110 years, 153 days |
| Guatemala | Valeria Andres Alvarado | F | 14 April 1917 | 109 years, 221 days |
| Guatemala | José Filadelfo Guillén Villalobos | M | 26 September 1917 | 108 years, 360 days |
| Guyana | Zorie De Mattos | F | 17 January 1915 | 111 years, 308 days |
| Guyana | Harold Bissoo | M | 8 April 1920 | 106 years, 227 days |
| Haiti | Joseph Mery Arthur (lives in Canada) | M | 7 July 1916 | 110 years, 137 days |
| Honduras | María del Pilar Salinas | F | 12 October 1914 | 112 years, 40 days |
| Honduras | Justo José Velásquez | M | 27 May 1917 | 109 years, 178 days |
| Hungary | Leventéné Csap | F | 14 April 1917 | 109 years, 221 days |
| Hungary | Sandor Fazekas (lives in the Australia) | M | 28 November 1918 | 107 years, 358 days |
| Hungary | László Papp (Note: Papp was born in the Hungarian Soviet Republic.) | M | 30 May 1919 | 107 years, 175 days |
| Iceland | Joninna Palsdottir | F | 17 March 1920 | 106 years, 249 days |
| Iceland | Thordur Jorundsson | M | 19 February 1922 | 104 years, 275 days |
| Iran | Hossein Wahid Khorasani | M | 1 January 1921 | 105 years, 324 days |
| Ireland | Catherine Hedges (lives in the UK) | F | 8 July 1916 | 110 years, 136 days |
| Ireland | Paddy Claffey (Note: Born in either the British-controlled territory called Southern Ireland (1921–1922), or in territory controlled by the first Irish Republican Army and called the Irish Republic.) | M | 17 April 1921 | 105 years, 218 days |
| Israel | László Roth (born in the Romania) | M | 4 July 1920 | 106 years, 140 days |
| Italy | Lucia Laura Sangenito | F | 22 November 1910 | 115 years, 364 days |
| Italy | Angelo Peressini | M | 2 July 1917 | 109 years, 142 days |
| Jamaica | Merah Smith (lives in the UK) | F | 9 November 1912 | 114 years, 12 days |
| Japan | Fuyo Kishimoto | F | 20 December 1911 | 114 years, 336 days |
| Japan | Hikaru Katō | M | 2 May 1914 | 112 years, 203 days |
| Kenya | Duncan Ndegwa (Note: Born in the Protectorate of British Kenya.) | M | 11 March 1925 | 101 years, 255 days |
| Kosovo | Sadije Hoti (Note: Hoti was born in an ethnic Albanian part of the Kingdom of Serbia.) | F | 15 March 1917 | 109 years, 251 days |
| Latvia | Marija Trošina | F | 18 October 1919 | 107 years, 34 days |
| Latvia | Bruno Strazdiņš | M | 26 January 1923 | 103 years, 299 days |
| Lithuania | Mollie "Malka" Horwitz (lives in the U.S.) | F | 16 March 1913 | 113 years, 250 days |
| Lithuania | Leonora Kontrimienė | F | 7 February 1916 | 110 years, 287 days |
| Luxembourg | Pauline Becker-Blasius | F | 11 January 1919 | 107 years, 314 days |
| Malta | Grace Gatt | F | 30 January 1916 | 110 years, 295 days |
| Mauritius | Noëlie Ami | F | 4 March 1916 | 110 years, 262 days |
| Mexico | Eulalia Bravo Bravo | F | 12 February 1913 | 113 years, 282 days |
| Mexico | Higinio Velasco Cisneros | M | 11 January 1916 | 110 years, 314 days |
| Moldova | Domnicăi Rotari | F | 20 May 1920 | 106 years, 185 days |
| Monaco | Dina Maccario (born in Italy) | F | 29 August 1919 | 107 years, 84 days |
| Mongolia | Luvsanjamtsyn Tsogzolmaa | F | 15 May 1924 | 102 years, 190 days |
| Montenegro | Novak Marković | M | 10 January 1922 | 104 years, 315 days |
| Myanmar | Than Shwe | M | 2 February 1933 | 93 years, 292 days |
| Netherlands | Elizabeth Philippina van Boven-Smaal | F | 5 January 1915 | 111 years, 320 days |
| Netherlands | Jan Boerema | M | 12 January 1919 | 107 years, 313 days |
| New Zealand | Aileen Kars | F | 12 September 1913 | 113 years, 70 days |
| New Zealand | Bruce Powell | M | 26 May 1918 | 108 years, 179 days |
| Nicaragua | Juana Paula Jarquin | F | 25 June 1916 | 110 years, 149 days |
| Nicaragua | Bernabé Romero González | M | 28 September 1918 | 108 years, 54 days |
| Nigeria | Kenneth Onyeneke Orizu III (Note: Born in the Southern Nigeria Protectorate which was under under British rule, which later united with the Northern Nigeria Protectorate to become the independent country of Nigeria.) | M | 30 October 1925 | 101 years, 22 days |
| Norway | Edna Ellynore Moum | F | 12 October 1915 | 111 years, 40 days |
| Norway | Odd Borlaug | M | 31 March 1917 | 109 years, 235 days |
| Panama | Juan Bautista Quiróz Pití | M | 29 August 1915 | 111 years, 84 days |
| Paraguay | Canuto González Britos | M | 19 January 1916 | 110 years, 306 days |
| Paraguay | Odette Nassif do Val (born in Brazil) | F | 24 July 1916 | 110 years, 120 days |
| Paraguay | Petrona Olazar de Palacios | F | 18 February 1918 | 108 years, 276 days |
| Peru | Victoria García Gil | F | 6 October 1915 | 111 years, 46 days |
| Peru | Clemente Medrano Domínguez | M | 28 September 1918 | 108 years, 54 days |
| Philippines | Lauro Bilaos | M | 17 August 1916 | 110 years, 96 days |
| Poland | Anna Winiarska (Note: Winiarska was born in Huta Gogołowska, Strzyżów County, then located in the Kingdom of Galicia and Lodomeria of Austria-Hungary, it is now located in the Podkarpackie Voivodeship of Poland.) | F | 23 February 1915 | 111 years, 271 days |
| Poland | Alfons Tomke | M | 16 July 1918 | 108 years, 128 days |
| Portugal | Joaquim Varela | M | 1 June 1915 | 111 years, 173 days |
| Portugal | Joaquina Guilhermina | F | 23 July 1915 | 111 years, 121 days |
| Romania | Iosif Rus (Note: Born in the Hungarian part of Austria-Hungary, now in Romania.) | M | 28 October 1915 | 111 years, 24 days |
| Romania | Viorica Veţian | F | 3 October 1916 | 110 years, 49 days |
| Russia | Vera Korolyova | F | 30 September 1914 | 112 years, 52 days |
| Russia | Ivan Deryabin (Note: Born in a part of the Russian Soviet Republic that is now Russia.) | M | 23 November 1918 | 107 years, 363 days |
| Rwanda | Venant Ntabomvura | M | 4 April 1926 | 100 years, 231 days |
| Saint Kitts and Nevis | Eliza Jeffers | F | 30 November 1919 | 106 years, 356 days |
| Saint Kitts and Nevis | Clarence Williams | M | 20 September 1922 | 104 years, 62 days |
| Serbia | Vukosav Đorđević | M | 10 September 1920 | 106 years, 72 days |
| Serbia | Marija Petrović | F | 19 January 1921 | 105 years, 306 days |
| Slovakia | Helena Ruczová (Note: Born in a part of the First Czechoslovak Republic that is now in Slovakia.) | F | 11 June 1919 | 107 years, 163 days |
| Slovakia | Daniel Lehotský | M | 22 December 1920 | 105 years, 334 days |
| Slovenia | Frančiška Manfreda | F | 22 September 1915 | 111 years, 60 days |
| Slovenia | Milan Šefman | M | 12 October 1919 | 107 years, 40 days |
| South Africa | Gertrude Malan (Note: Born in the Union of South Africa, it is now the Republic of South Africa.) | F | 17 August 1916 | 110 years, 96 days |
| South Africa | William Masindi Sadiki | M | 18 February 1919 | 107 years, 276 days |
| Spain | Teresa Fernandez Casado | F | 29 July 1913 | 113 years, 115 days |
| Spain | Jesús Redondo Bermejo | M | 2 June 1915 | 111 years, 172 days |
| Sri Lanka | Bolanda Hakuru Meniel | M | 4 June 1915 | 111 years, 170 days |
| Suriname | Hetty van Orsoy | F | 9 February 1920 | 106 years, 285 days |
| Sweden | Birgit Johansson | F | 9 December 1915 | 110 years, 347 days |
| Sweden | Oskar Ferm | M | 13 June 1918 | 108 years, 161 days |
| Switzerland | Paulina Hufschmid | F | 2 October 1915 | 111 years, 50 days |
| Switzerland | Walter Muller | M | 5 April 1919 | 107 years, 230 days |
| Syria | Jassim | M | 5 January 1922 | 104 years, 320 days (Note: Jassim's exactly date of birth is uncertain, but he was at least 103 as of 16 May 2025.) |
| Taiwan | Yu Te-Hsin (born in China) | M | 17 March 1915 | 111 years, 249 days |
| Taiwan | Chin-Tao Huang (lives in Australia) | F | 15 May 1915 | 111 years, 190 days |
| Tajikistan | Fotima Salimova | F | 20 January 1913 | 113 years, 305 days |
| Trinidad and Tobago | Herman Griffith | M | 9 December 1920 | 105 years, 347 days |
| Turkey | Paressa Orfanidou (lives in Greece) | F | 18 September 1915 | 111 years, 64 days |
| United Kingdom | Ethel Caterham | F | 21 August 1909 | 117 years, 92 days |
| United Kingdom | Hugh Kerr | M | 9 October 1915 | 111 years, 43 days |
| United States | Naomi Whitehead | F | 26 September 1910 | 116 years, 56 days |
| United States | James Clayton Flowers | M | 25 December 1915 | 110 years, 331 days |
| Uruguay | Ema Ana Schneider | F | 10 April 1916 | 110 years, 225 days |
| Uruguay | Francisco Tejera | M | 26 July 1919 | 107 years, 118 days |
| Vanuatu | Ati George Sokomanu | M | 13 January 1936 | 90 years, 312 days |
| Venezuela | Pedro María Molina Márquez | M | 27 April 1915 | 111 years, 208 days |
| Venezuela | Carmen Burguera Dávila | F | 12 June 1916 | 110 years, 162 days |
| Yemen | Mohammed Basindawa | M | 4 April 1935 | 91 years, 231 days |
| Zambia | Peter Chanda Kasolo | M | 30 June 1925 | 101 years, 144 days |

=== Dependent territories ===
Unvalidated Pending.

| Country | Territory | Name | Sex | Birth date | Age as of 21 November 2026 |
|---|---|---|---|---|---|
| Finland | Åland | Runar Blomsterlund | M | 8 May 1922 | 104 years, 197 days |
| Finland | Åland | Helena Larson | F | 12 July 1924 | 102 years, 132 days |
| France | French Guiana | Edouard Maurice Henry (born in Martinique) | M | 18 March 1920 | 106 years, 248 days |
| France | Guadeloupe | Gervaise Baclet | F | 5 February 1916 | 110 years, 289 days |
| France | Guadeloupe | Honoré Petilaire-Bellet | M | 12 June 1919 | 107 years, 162 days |
| France | Martinique | Marie-Dominique Zadick | F | 14 August 1913 | 113 years, 99 days |
| France | Martinique | Lazare Levanne | M | 2 September 1919 | 107 years, 80 days |
| France | Wallis and Futuna | Visesio Moeliku | M | 22 December 1922 | 103 years, 334 days |
| Netherlands | Sint Maarten | Doris Hodge-Wilson (born in Saba Island) | F | 29 October 1921 | 105 years, 23 days |
| Portugal | Azores | Idalina Moniz | F | 28 October 1916 | 110 years, 24 days |
| United Kingdom | Bermuda | Leona Thompson | F | 12 April 1917 | 109 years, 223 days |
| United Kingdom | British Virgin Islands | Floresa George | F | 16 April 1923 | 103 years, 219 days |
| United Kingdom | British Virgin Islands | Evelyn Hodge | M | 21 May 1923 | 103 years, 184 days |
| United Kingdom | Montserrat | Sarah Piper | F | 18 February 1917 | 109 years, 276 days |
| United States | Puerto Rico | María Magdalena Fernández Rodríguez | F | 6 March 1916 | 110 years, 260 days |
| United States | Puerto Rico | Manuel Martínez Milán | M | 18 June 1916 | 110 years, 156 days |
