= Capovilla =

Capovilla is an Italian surname. Notable people with the surname include:

- María Capovilla (1889–2006), Ecuadorian supercentenarian, once the world's oldest living people
- Loris Francesco Capovilla (1915–2016), Italian Prelate of the Roman Catholic Church
