= Rosa Rein =

Swiss supercentenarian (1897–2010)

- Born: 24 March 1897; Dzietkowitz (Dziećkowice), a suburb of Myslowitz, Upper Silesia, German Empire, now Poland
- Died: 14 February 2010 (aged 112 years, 327 days); Paradiso, Switzerland
- Occupation: Retired
- Known for: Oldest verified person ever in Switzerland

Rosa Rein (née Karliner; 24 March 1897 – 14 February 2010) was a German-born Swiss supercentenarian who, at the time of her death was the oldest person in Switzerland, and the oldest known Jew in the world.

== Biography ==
Rein was born in Upper Silesia in Dzietkowitz, at the time part of the German Empire, but now in Poland. She grew up in a well-to-do family, with five siblings, on a farming estate with two dozen employees. She went to school in neighbouring Mysłowice, and eventually went to college, which was not common for women in that period. In 1935 she got married and ran a textile business with her husband. A German Jew, she fled the country with her husband after Kristallnacht, to Brazil. Her mother would later die in a Nazi concentration camp. Her husband died shortly after their arrival in Brasil.

She remarried in 1949 and due to her husband's failing health they moved to Genoa in 1964 before settling in Paradiso, Switzerland. In 1973 Rein's second husband died. Both marriages were without children and her remaining family lived abroad. She lived on her own until 2001, when she moved to a nursing home, where she lived until her death. Apart from failing eyesight and hearing she was in good health until her death.

== Oldest person ==
Rein became the oldest person in Switzerland in September 2006, and the oldest Swiss ever in June 2008. Following the death of Berta Rosenberg in January 2009, she became the oldest known Jew in the world. At the time of her death she was also the oldest person born in Germany.

== See also ==
- List of the oldest people by country
