= Hendrikje van Andel-Schipper =

Dutch supercentenarian (1890–2005)

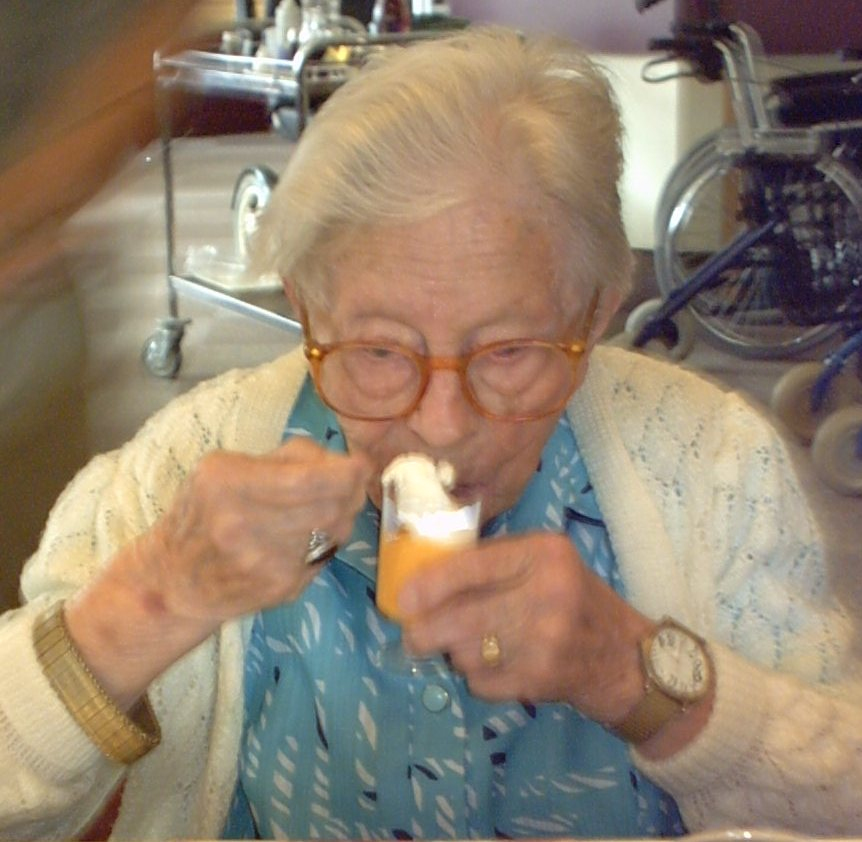
- Van Andel-Schipper on her 113th birthday in 2003
- Born: Hendrikje Schipper; 29 June 1890; Smilde, Netherlands
- Died: 30 August 2005 (aged 115 years, 62 days); Hoogeveen, Netherlands
- Known for: Oldest Dutch person ever
- Spouse: Dick van Andel (m. 1939; died 1959)

Hendrikje van Andel-Schipper ([ˈɦɛndrɪkjə vɑn ˈɑndəl ˈsxɪpər]; born Hendrikje Schipper; 29 June 1890 – 30 August 2005) was a Dutch supercentenarian who lived to the age of 115 years, 62 days. She is the oldest person ever from the Netherlands, breaking the previous record of Catharina van Dam on 26 September 2003, and from 29 May 2004 was the oldest verified person in the world, until the verification of María Capovilla.

== Life ==
Van Andel-Schipper was born as Hendrikje Schipper on 29 June 1890 in Smilde, a small village in Drenthe. She was born prematurely, and there were doubts that she would survive. However, thanks to the continuous care of her grandmother during her first four weeks, she recovered. At the age of five on her first day of school, she was sick again and was removed from the school on advice of a local doctor. Her father, headmaster at the local school, taught her to read and write.

She had a love of theatre from a young age, but after her mother objected she decided not to pursue a career in acting and became a needlework teacher instead. At the age of 46, she met her future husband Dick van Andel, who worked in Amsterdam. She left her parents' home at the age of 49 and married Van Andel, a divorced tax inspector, in 1939, taking the hyphenated name of Van Andel-Schipper—which is customary in the Netherlands.

During the Second World War, she and her husband moved to Hoogeveen, where she had to sell jewellery to help pay for food during the German occupation. Her husband died from cancer in 1959. She underwent a mastectomy in 1990 after being diagnosed with breast cancer at the age of 100. She continued to live on her own before moving into a retirement home at the age of 105.

She became the oldest recognized woman in Europe on the death of Maria Teresa Fumarola Ligorio in May 2003, and the oldest recognized person in Europe on the death of Joan Riudavets in March 2004. Following the death of Charlotte Benkner in early May 2004 Van Andel-Schipper became the second-oldest recognized person in the world behind Ramona Trinidad Iglesias-Jordan, whose death later that month left her apparently the world's oldest at 113 years and 335 days old. However, María Capovilla from Ecuador was older, but her claim had not yet been verified.

For her 115th birthday in 2005, she received a visit from a daughter-in-law of Queen Beatrix of the Netherlands and a delegation from football club Ajax Amsterdam. The last time the Ajax team visited her she complained that the other residents of her nursing home were "hicks who don't understand football". She had been a fan of Ajax since she attended a match more than 80 years earlier. During her last years she was the last Dutch citizen to be born during the reign of King Willem III who died in 1890.

== Death ==
Van Andel-Schipper died in her sleep on 30 August 2005, two months after her 115th birthday. She had remained mentally alert up until her death, but suffered from increasing frailty. Several days prior to her death she told the director of her nursing home, Johan Beijering, that "It's been nice, but the man upstairs says it's time to go". She agreed to leave her body to science when she was 82. An autopsy at the University of Groningen revealed that she died of undetected gastric cancer, the tumor in her stomach being the size of a small fist. At the time of her death, she was the second-oldest living person behind María Capovilla.

== Longevity ==
Van Andel-Schipper had stated that the secret to her longevity was a serving of herring every day and drinking orange juice. She later jokingly added "breathing." On another occasion, she gave the following advice: "Don't smoke and don't drink too much alcohol. Just a small advocaat with cream on Sundays and holidays. And you must remain active."

On 9 December 2005, Guinness World Records recognized the claim of then 116-year-old María Capovilla of Ecuador to be the world's oldest person, supplanting Van Andel-Schipper from the revised title, to become the world's oldest living person on 29 May 2004, upon the death of Ramona Trinidad Iglesias-Jordan, she would have become the world's oldest living person at the age of 113 years and 335 days.

In June 2008, Gert Holstege, a professor at the University of Groningen, said following a post-mortem analysis of Van Andel-Schipper's brain that there was little indication of the kinds of problems in the brain, some related to Alzheimer's disease, that are normally found in individuals who survive to extreme ages. According to Holstege, hers was the first known brain of such an advanced age "that did not have these problems."

The complete genome of Van Andel-Schipper has been analysed by the VU University Medical Center in Amsterdam, who are researching longevity genes. Her autopsy showed no traces of dementia.

A study published in Genome Research suggests the key to Van Andel-Schipper's longevity may lie in her stem cells, which fight off infection. Her system was superior for repairing or getting rid of cells with dangerous mutations. The author of the study suggested personality may also have something to do with longevity as well: people who live past 100 tend to have forgiveness as a common character trait. They tend to focus on something positive when something bad happens. Whenever a misfortune befell her, Van Andel-Schipper's response was to say that "There's no point in moaning." Another study has connected longer life spans, as exemplified by Van Andel-Schipper, to positive attitudes towards the aging process itself.

== See also ==
- List of Dutch supercentenarians
- List of the oldest people by country

== Sources ==
- Holstege, H.; et al. (2014). "Somatic mutations found in the healthy blood compartment of a 115-yr-old woman demonstrate oligoclonal hematopoiesis". Genome Research. 24 (5): 733–742. doi:10.1101/gr.162131.113. PMC 4009603. PMID 24760347.
