= Luvsanjamtsyn Tsogzolmaa =

Mongolian actress and singer (born 1924)

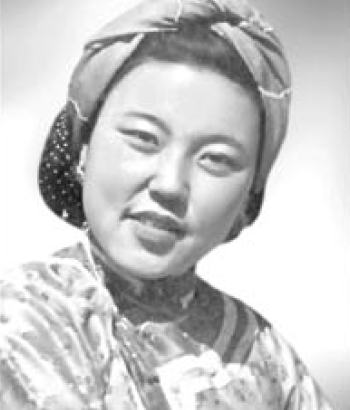
- Born: 15 June 1924 (age 102); Ugtaal, Mongolia
- Occupations: Actress; singer
- Spouse: Tsendiin Namsray
- Children: 5, including Namsrayn Suvd

Luvsanjamtsyn Tsogzolmaa (Mongolian: Лувсанжамцын Цогзолмаа; born 15 June 1924) is a Mongolian actress and singer. She was named as Honored Artist of Mongolia (1945), People's Artist of Mongolia (2001), Hero of Labour of Mongolia (2007) and Laureate of the State Prize of Mongolia (1951).

== Life ==
Tsogzolmaa was orphaned early. As a child, she attended a music class at the Youth Culture House. From 1936 to 1938, she studied at a Russian school. At the age of 13, she came to the USSR with her adoptive parents, where she learned Russian. In 1938-1940, she worked as a musician at the Youth Culture House, in 1940-1944 - as a musician at the state circus, in 1944-1957 - a singer at the State Circus of the Mongolian People's Republic and the State Musical and Drama Theater. Soloist of the choir created in 1947 at the theater.

From 1957 to 1961, Tsogzolmaa studied at the directing department of the performing arts faculty of the Mongolian State University. From 1961 to 1967, she worked as the director of the State People's Song and Dance Ensemble, and from 1967 to 1983, she was an expert at the Ministry of Culture of the Mongolian People's Republic.

Tsogzolmaa made a great contribution to the development of Mongolian cinema.

Tsogzolmaa was married to Mongolian statesman, politician and diplomat Tsendiin Namsray (1918–1990). She is the mother of Honored Artist of Mongolia Namsrayn Suvd, Hero of Labour of Mongolia, laureate of the State Prize of Mongolia. Tsogzolmaa turned 100 in 2024.
