= Namsrayn Suvd =

Mongolian actor (born 1948)

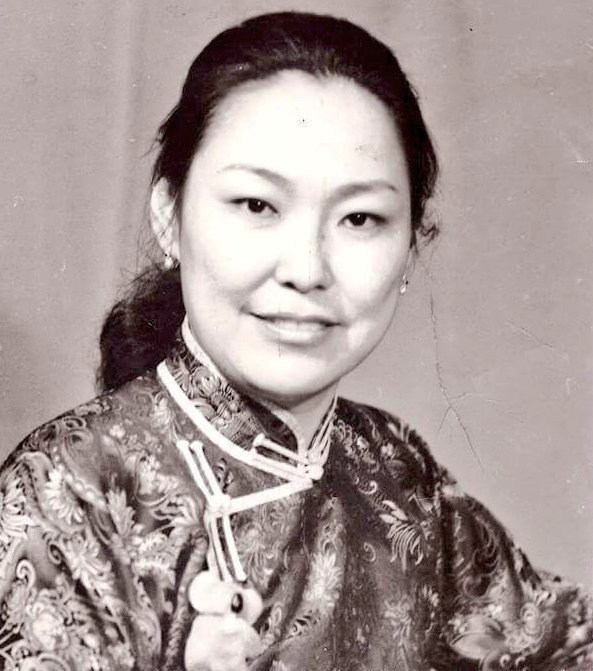
- Born: Намсрайн Сувд; 21 December 1948 (age 77); Ulaanbaatar
- Education: Gerasimov Institute of Cinematography
- Occupation: Actress
- Known for: 100 plays and films - Mongolian Hero of Labour
- Spouse: Ts. Turbold (married 1971 - 1990)
- Parent(s): Luvsanjamtsyn Tsogzolmaa; Tsendiin Namsray

Namsrayn Suvd (born 21 December 1948) is a Mongolian actor. For her long career in film and the theatre, she was named as People’s Actress of Mongolia (2009), Mongolian State Awardee(1989), a Mongolian Hero of Labour in 2021.

== Life ==
Suvd was born in Ulaanbaatar. Her father was Ts. Namsray who was notable for his contribution to education and Mongolian culture.

In 1970 she graduated as an actor in the USSR's VGIK.

She began her stage career in Mongolia at the State Drama Academic Theater in 1973. Four years later the Ministry of Culture recognised her performance in a play titled "Truth Will Win" by giving her a "Best Art Award" which they repeated in 1984 after she played the eponymous role in "Nora".

She has appeared in The Servant of Two Masters and in 1978 she played both Emilia and Desdemona in Othello. She has played Ophelia in Hamlet and Lady Macbeth in Macbeth and in 2020 she played Anna (Destiny) in Anna Karenina.

Her film work included appearing in the epic No Right to Die – Chinggis Khaan. It was her appearance as Mandukhai in the film, "Mandukhai The Wise Queen” that gained her a state award and in 2001 she was recognised as an "Honoured Actor of Mongolia. In 2006 she was honoured twice at the "Saint Musa" festival as a best female lead in the plays "Tears of the Night" and "Atga Nuj". She received more recognition at that festival in 2010 and in 2012 for "Swan Song" and "The Secret of the Sober Couple". Meanwhile, in 2009 she was named as a "People's Actor of Mongolia".

In 2021 on the 21 November she was recognised as a Hero of Labour by the President of Mongolia, Ukhnaagiin Khürelsükh. This is a high honour the award has only been made to about thirty people. The citation identified the "over 100" characters she had created on stage and on screen including Ophelia and the ruler Mandukhai in the 1988 film.

== Films ==
- Listen to your enemy soldiers! (1971) - Tsendsuren
- Inception (1972) - Khorloo
- In Hibernation (1972) - Insane girl
- Motor Song (1974) - singer
- Song of First Love (1974) - Yanjin
- The Story of Suxbold (1974) -
- Chimgee’s birthday (1973) - Side character
- The Spouse (1975) - Sun
- Human Life (1976) - Sarantuya, Moonlight
- Bushboy Tales (1979) - Mermaid
- Khatanbaatar (1981) - Joy
- Amulet or Guardian (1983) - maid
- Mandukhai Setsen Khatan (movie) (1988) - Mandukhai
- Under the Eternal Sky (1992) - Öelün
- At the time of the yak tapping (2002) - Suren
- Vansemberoo (2002) - Amaa
- Can't Die - Chinggis Khan (2008) - Öelün
- Ancestry ( Origin) (2013) - Mother
- Lifeology (2017) - Judge
- Heartbreak (2017) - Mother
- Billionaire’s case (2018) - Nansalmaa
- The Sun’s Relative (2022) - Dunjin Tsookhor
- The Bride (2023) - Ariunsanaa’s mother

== Stage work includes ==
- How Bold dried up (1972) - Tonya
- A woman without a dowry (1973) - Larisa
- Nandin Erdene (1973) - Flower
- Five fingers (1973) - Oyun
- Orolmaa (1973) - Hatter
- Orolmaa (1974) - Delger
- Orolmaa (1974) - Dulamsuren
- Firebird (1974) - Ti Khani
- Times have changed (1974) - Sketch
- Times have changed (1974) - Varduy
- Eye (1974) - Number generator
- Yegor Bulychev's family (1975) - Glafira
- The Doshinjirim people (1975) - Tsesmaa
- The Only Servant of Two Masters (1976) - Beatrice
- Even if it's death, the truth will win (1977) - Commissar
- Bear (1977) - Popova
- Bumbat Erdene (1977) - Chimgee
- In search of happiness (1977) - Tanya
- Budamshuu (1978) - Pink
- Top Secret (1978) - Togtokh
- After the meeting (1978) - Lady
- Othello (1978) - Emily
- Othello (1978) - Desdemona
- Nandin Erdene (1978) - Tsevelmaa
- Military widow (1978) - Stesha
- Hamlet (1979) - Ophelia
- Infirm father (1979) - Yanjin
- Countess (1980) - Dulmaa
- Human ice (1980) - Maria
- Scientist’s talk (1980) - Khishigmaa
- Forgotten melody (1983) - Badam
- Nora (1984) - Nora
- Inspector (1985) - Anna Andreevna
- Garvaa (1985) - Sevjid
- Pearl bead (1986) - Jenny
- The Tale of the Little Boy (1986) - Mother Aimaljin
- Rejected love (1988) - Ghost
- Macbeth (1991) - Lady Macbeth
- Bet (2000) - Nansal
- Seagull (2001) - Irina Nikolaevna Arkadina
- Between death (2003) - Tanya
- Tears tasted at night (2005) - Enkhee
- Make me a man (2005) - Mendee
- Mom (2006) - Mom
- Atga nuj (2006) - Öelün
- Swan’s song (2010) - Anna
- Son of Heaven (2011) - Mogol Queen
- The Secret of the cool khas (2013) - Lady Lou
- Anna Karenina (2020) - Anna (Destiny)
- King of Kings. Oath. (2021) - Mother Alungoo
- Good man from Sichuan (2022) - Mrs. Yang (Yan)
