= No Right to Die – Chinggis Khaan =

2008 Mongolian film

No right to die - Chinggis Khaan
- Directed by: L Erdenebulgan
- Written by: S Jargalsaikhan
- Starring: Tsegmedin Tumurbaatar; P Tserendagva; Namsrayn Suvd; B Jargalsaikhan; I Odonchimeg; Demidbaatar; Gombo Zolboot; Tsenguun Chinges
- Release date: August 13, 2008
- Country: Mongolia
- Language: Mongolian

No Right to Die – Chinggis Khaan (Mongolian: Үхэж үл болно, Чингис Хаан) is a 2008 film directed by L Erdenebulgan based on the life of Temüjin, the young Genghis Khan and his unification of Mongolia, previously consisting of warring and minor kingdoms. The film is one of the largest-budgeted films produced in Mongolia.
