= Tsenguun Chinges =

Mongolian acrobat and pole dancer

- Чингэсийн Цэнгүүн
- Born: February 26, 1993 (age 32)
- Occupations: acrobat; pole dancer
- Years active: 2000-present

Tsenguun Chinges (born February 26, 1993) is a Mongolian acrobat, pole dancer based in Ulaanbaatar, Mongolia. He performed pole dancing on Mongolia's Got Talent (season 2). He was eliminated on semi-final. Tsenguun's mother is professional gymnast. Chinges is a performer and acrobat at Mongolian National Circus.

Besides his professional career, Chinges appeared on "No Right to Die – Chinggis Khaan" in 2008, and "Above All /in mongolian: Бүхнээс дээгүүр" in 2017

Chinges will be performing at Cirque Phenix (Paris) in November 2019 among Mongolian jugglers, contortionists, acrobats, clowns, musicians, dancers and singers.

== Photography ==
Tsenguun has been featured on N A K I D online magazine in August, 2019. The photos brought controversial issues around his social media, and society about nudism and oblique concept. However, he mentioned at the interview that he was happy to be featured.

== See also ==
- Mongolia's Got Talent
