= María Capovilla =

Ecuadorian supercentenarian (1889–2006)

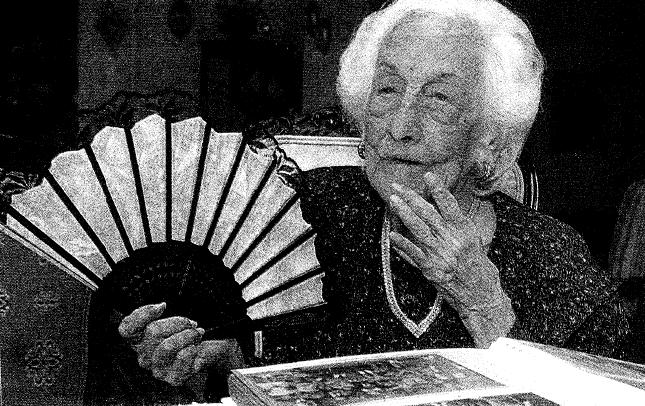
- Capovilla in 2005
- Born: Maria Esther Heredia Lecaro; 14 September 1889; Guayaquil, Ecuador
- Died: 27 August 2006 (aged 116 years, 347 days); Guayaquil, Ecuador
- Known for: World's oldest living person from 29 May 2004 to 27 August 2006
- Spouse: Antonio Capovilla (m. 1917; died 1949)
- Children: 5

María Esther Heredia Lecaro de Capovilla, known internationally as María Capovilla (14 September 1889 – 27 August 2006), was an Ecuadorian supercentenarian, and, at the time of her death at age 116 years, 347 days, was recognized by Guinness World Records as the world's oldest living person. She was the last living person verified to have been born in the 1880s.

== Biography ==
Born as María Esther Heredia Lecaro in Guayaquil, she was the daughter of a colonel, and lived a life among the upper-class elite, attending social functions and art classes. She never smoked and drank in moderation.

In 1917, she married an Austrian military officer and sailor, Antonio Capovilla (1864–1949). Of Italian ethnicity, Antonio was born in Pola, Austria-Hungary (now Pula, Croatia). He moved to Chile in 1894 and then to Ecuador in 1910. After his first wife died, he married María until his death in 1949. Together they had five children, three of whom were still living at the time of María's death: Hilda (age 81), Irma (age 79) and son Anibal (age 77). She also had twelve grandchildren, twenty great-grandchildren and two great-great-grandchildren.

At age 100, Capovilla nearly died and was given last rites, but had been free of health problems since then. In December 2005, aged 116, Maria was in good health for someone of her age and watched TV, read the paper and walked without the aid of a stick (though she was helped by an aide). Capovilla was unable to leave her home in the two years before her death and she shared her home with her eldest daughter Hilda, and her son-in-law. In a media interview Capovilla stated her dislike of the fact that women nowadays are permitted to court men, rather than the reverse.

In March 2006, however, Capovilla's health had declined, and she was not able to read the newspaper any more. She had nearly stopped talking and no longer walked except when helped by two people. Still, Capovilla was able to sit in her chair and fan herself, and had been doing fine until she succumbed to a bout of pneumonia in the last week of August 2006, 18 days before she would have celebrated her 117th birthday.

== Age records ==
Capovilla's records were submitted to Guinness on 27 August 2005, exactly one year before her death aged 115 years, 347 days, and was named the World's Oldest Person by Guinness World Records on 9 December 2005 aged 116 years, 86 days, thus superseding both Hendrikje van Andel-Schipper of the Netherlands thought to be the world's oldest person from 29 May 2004 to 30 August 2005, when she died, and Elizabeth Bolden of the United States, thought to be the world's oldest person from 30 August 2005 to 9 December 2005. Capovilla was added to the Guinness website on 12 April 2006 aged 116 years and 210 days.

At the time of her death aged 116 years and 347 days, Capovilla was originally believed to have been the fourth-oldest verified person to have ever lived. However, the subsequent validation of 117-year old Delphia Welford on 29 April 2023 meant that she is the fifth-oldest. Capovilla had been the oldest verified South American until Francisca Celsa dos Santos from Brazil surpassed her age on 4 October 2021, prior to her death the following day.

Following her death on 27 August 2006, her successor as the world’s oldest living person was Elizabeth Bolden.

== See also ==
- List of the verified oldest people
- List of the oldest people by country
