= Herman Smith-Johannsen =

Norwegian skier and supercentenarian (1875–1987)

Herman Smith-Johannsen CM
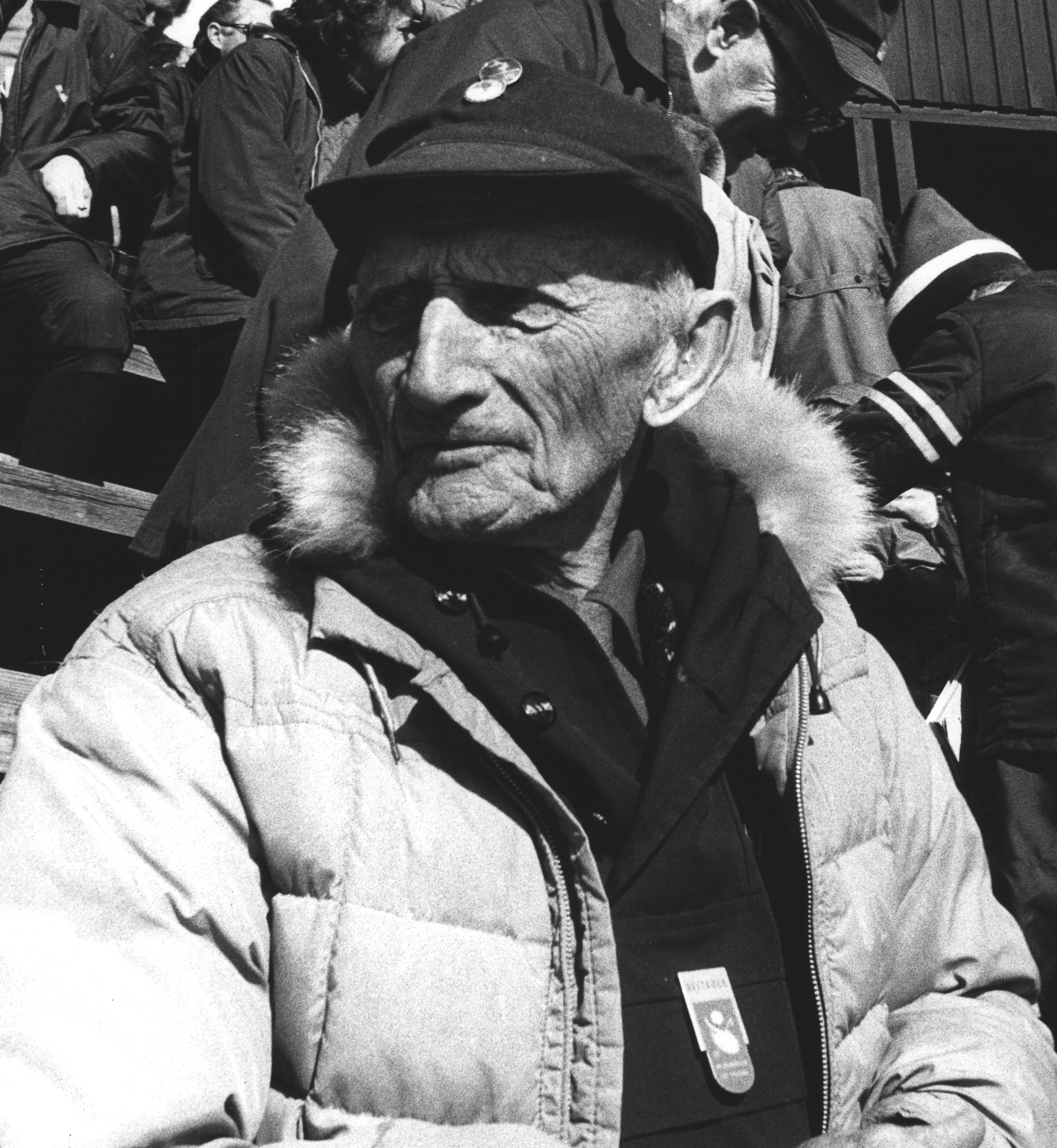
- Smith-Johannsen in March 1974
- Born: 15 June 1875; Horten, Norway
- Died: January 5, 1987 (aged 111 years, 204 days) near Tønsberg, Norway
- Resting place: Saint-Sauveur, Quebec, Canada
- Education: Norwegian Military Academy, University of Berlin
- Occupation: Skier
- Known for: World's oldest living man (14 December 1986 – 5 January 1987); Oldest verified Norwegian man ever

Herman "Jackrabbit" Smith-Johannsen, CM (15 June 1875 – 5 January 1987) was a Norwegian skier and supercentenarian. He was the world's oldest verified living man from the death of 111-year-old Joe Thomas of the United States on 14 December 1986 until his own death on 5 January 1987, and is additionally the oldest verified man in Norwegian history. He was appointed as a Member of the Order of Canada in 1972. He is credited for building many ski jumps and blazing trails in Canada, and New York. He is known for his one-day ascent of Mount Marcy, the tallest mountain in New York. He was born in Horten, Norway, and later moved to the United States, before settling in Piedmont, Quebec.

== Personal life ==
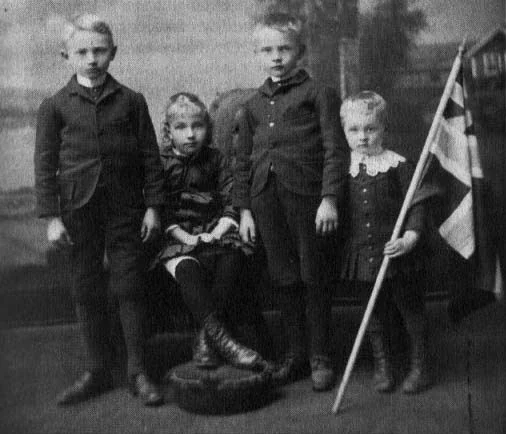
Smith-Johannsen with his siblings in 1885

Smith-Johannsen was born in Horten, Norway, on 15 June 1875, the oldest of nine children. After studying in Berlin he moved to the United States before settling in Piedmont, Quebec. He married Alice Robinson (1882–1963) in 1907. They had three children; Alice, Robert, and Peggy.

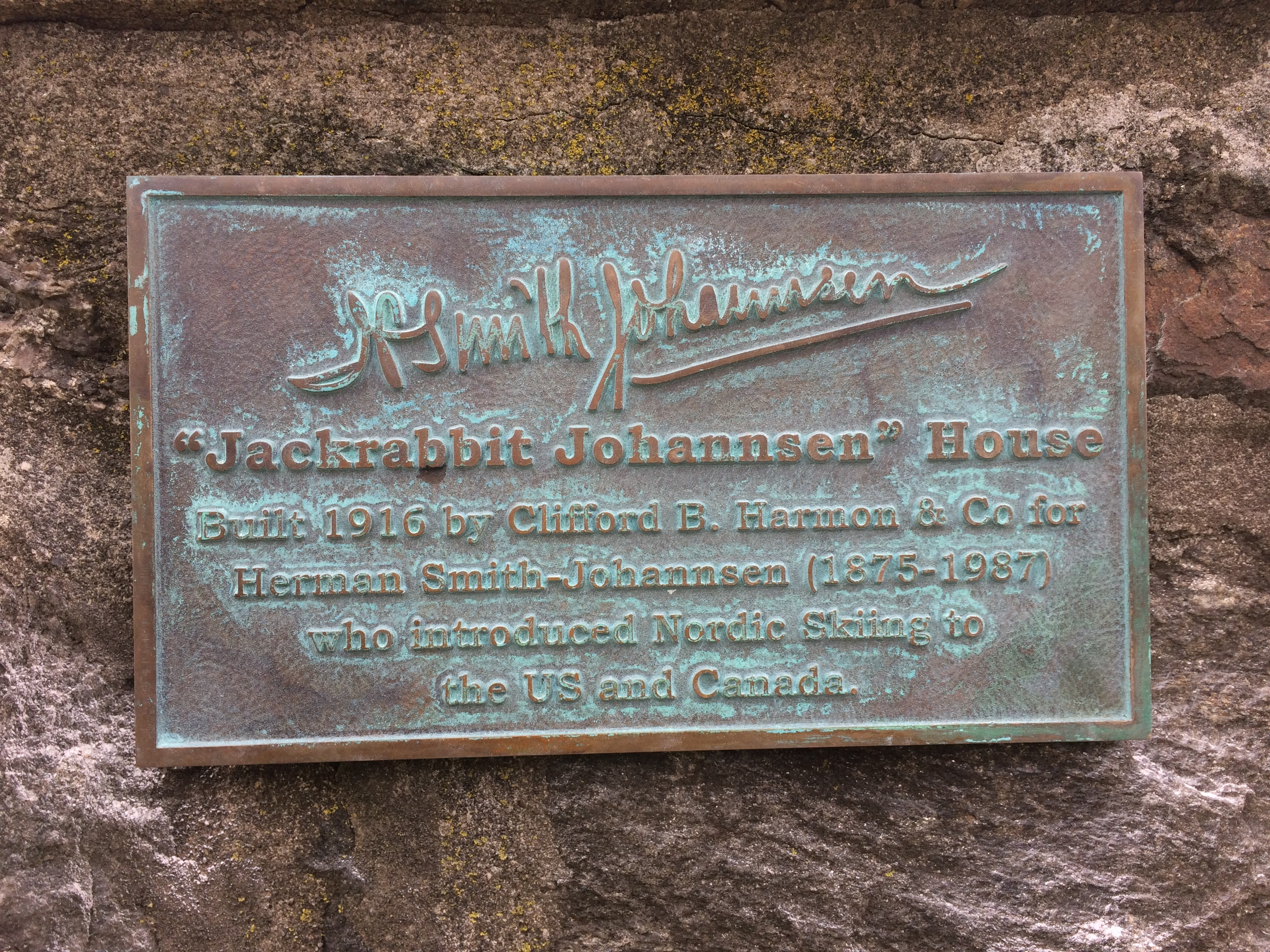
Marker on house the Johannsen's acquired to live in c. 1916 in Pelham, New York

The family moved to Pelham, just outside New York City, in 1916. Smith-Johannsen managed a business importing heavy-equipment from Norway to North America and Cuba, shuttling between New York and Montreal, until the family permanently settled in Canada ca. 1929.

While on a trip to Norway to visit friends, Smith-Johannsen became ill and doctors would not let him fly home. Smith-Johannsen died from pneumonia on 5 January 1987 at the age of 111 years and 204 days near Tønsberg, Norway, he was the oldest verified living man in the world for the last 22 days of his life, following his death, 110-year-old Alphaeus Philemon Cole became the world’s oldest living man. He is buried by the St. Sauveur church in Saint-Sauveur, Quebec, next to his wife, who died in 1963. His archives are held at the McGill University Archives in Montreal.

== Professional life ==
Smith-Johannsen graduated from the Norwegian Military Academy in 1894 with a commission as a lieutenant in the Norwegian Army Reserve.

In 1899 he graduated with an engineering degree from the University of Berlin. Two years later he moved to Cleveland, Ohio, where he worked at selling heavy machinery. In 1907 he became an independent agent, selling heavy equipment, based out of New York City and eventually Montreal.

== Sportsman ==
Smith-Johannsen is credited with building many ski jumps and with blazing trails throughout Ontario, the Eastern Townships, the Laurentians, and the Adirondack Mountains in New York. In 1972 he was appointed as a Member of the Order of Canada for fostering and developing skiing as a recreation and helping and encouraging generations of skiers in Canada.

Founded in 1986, the Jackrabbit Ski Trail in the Adirondacks is named in honour of Johannsen. While living and vacationing in Lake Placid between 1916 and 1928, Smith-Johannsen laid out some of the original routes used by today's trail. He was also famous for his one-day ascents of Mount Marcy (the highest mountain in New York State) starting from Lake Placid, a round-trip of over 30 miles.

Smith-Johannsen is also the namesake of Cross Country Canada's Jackrabbit program designed to introduce children 6–9 to cross-country skiing through local ski clubs. Some former "Jackrabbits" introduced to skiing through the program include Olympic medallists Beckie Scott, Sara Renner, and Chandra Crawford and World Champions Devon Kershaw and Alex Harvey.

In 1968, Smith-Johannsen received an honorary doctorate from Sir George Williams University, which later became Concordia University. In 1969 he was inducted to the National Ski Hall of Fame. He was profiled during ABC Sports coverage of the 1984 Winter Olympic Games. He was an honorary member of the Norwegian skiing and gentlemen's club SK Ull.
