= Venant Ntabomvura =

Rwandan physician (born 1926)

Dr. Venant Ntabomvura
- Born: 4 April 1926 (age 100); Gisagara, Southern Province, Rwanda
- Education: National University of Rwanda
- Occupation: Otorhinolaryngologist
- Years active: 1946–2014
- Known for: First student in Rwanda, oldest documented person in Rwanda
- Medical career
- Profession: Otorhinolaryngology

Venant Ntabomvura (born 4 April 1926) is the first registered student at the National University of Rwanda in 1963.

== Early life ==
Ntabomvura was born in the Kibirizi sector of Gisagara District, in Southern Province, Rwanda. According to Ntabomvura, he began primary school sometime around 1933. He had 13 siblings, two of which died as children. His father was a teacher and taught him during several years of his primary school education.

In 1939, Ntabomvura joined the Groupe Scolaire Officiel de Butare, a secondary school which focused on a variety of subjects. It was during this time he began to focus on nursing and medicine.

== Career ==
After six years of study with the GSOB, in 1945 Ntabomvura began a medical internship in Kibungo, which lasted for two years. Following this, he became a nurse for five years. During this time, he also began working at dispensaries across Ruanda-Urundi. In 1952, he briefly returned to school and received a certificate which allowed him to head a health center. From 1946 to 1962, Ntabomvura worked as a medical assistant.

In 1962, Ntabomvura attended the National University of Rwanda as their first registered student. He graduated in 1968 with a degree in medicine.

During the presidency of Grégoire Kayibanda, Kayibanda attempted to recruit Ntabomvura for pro-government operations. However, Ntabomvura rejected this. For a time, he was jailed and deleted from the list of students at the university. However, Georges-Henri Lévesque, founder of the University of Rwanda, was able to help free Ntabomvura from jail and bring him back to the university.

Following graduation, he became the Director of the University Teaching at the Hospital of Butare.

In 1962, Ntabomvura was appointed as the Minister for Health, Social Affairs, and Internal Affairs. In 1972, he was appointed as the Minister of Social Affairs once more. During this time, he still continued his medical practice.

As a doctor, Ntabomvura became the first practitioner of otorhinolaryngology at the University Teaching at the Hospital of Butare. This came after he received specialty training in Belgium, France and the US. Starting in 1994, he was the Director of Otorhinolaryngology.

Ntabomvura was rector for University of Rwanda from 1981 to 1984.

Ntabomvura retired at 88 years old. However, despite his retirement, Ntabomvura continued his medical practice occasionally.

== Personal life ==
In May 2019, it was reported that Ntabomvura, was still working and driving at the age of 93. As of 2023, Ntabomvura had 13 children, 31 grandchildren and 17 great-grandchildren. However, as of 2016, two of them had died.

Ntabomvura's wife died on December 25, 2018.

Ntabomvura is a practicing Catholic.

Regarding his old age, Ntabomvura credited his lifestyle for enabling him to live a long time. He never smoked or drank, avoided sugar, and avoided industrial products. He kept a personal garden which supplied him with many of the vegetables he ate. On 4 April 2026, Ntabomvura turned 100.
