= List of Dutch supercentenarians =

People from the Netherlands who have attained or surpassed the age of 110 years

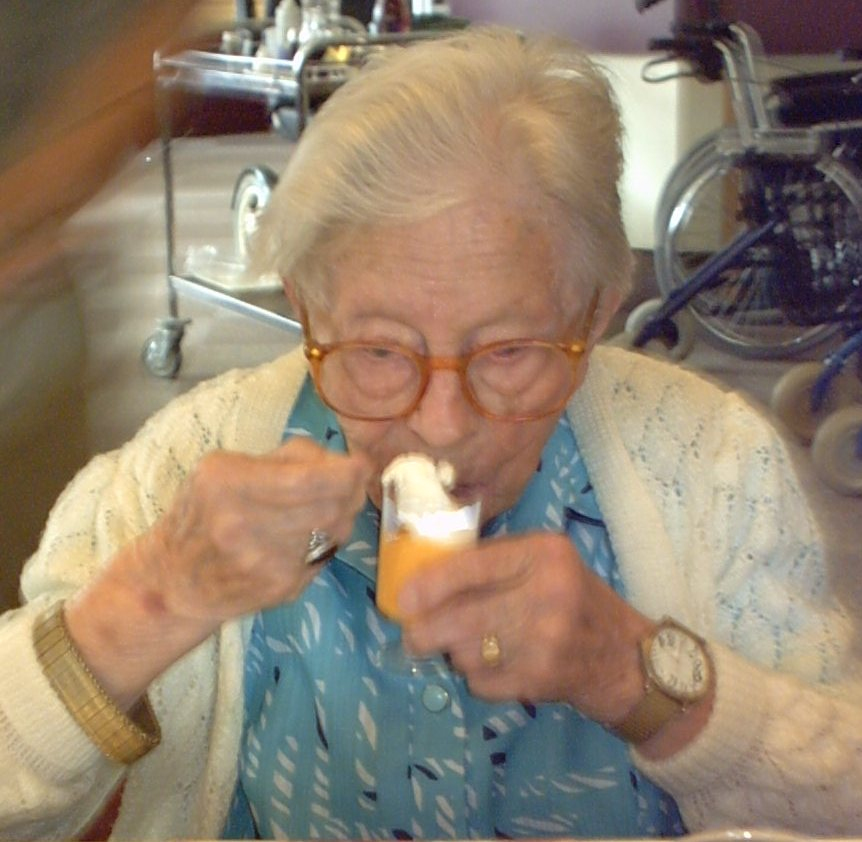
The oldest Dutch person ever, Hendrikje van Andel-Schipper (1890–2005), died aged 115 years and 62 days.

Dutch supercentenarians are citizens, residents or emigrants from the Netherlands who have attained or surpassed 110 years of age. As of January 2015, the Gerontology Research Group (GRG) had validated the longevity claims of 27 Dutch supercentenarians. The oldest Dutch person ever was Hendrikje van Andel-Schipper, who lived 115 years, 62 days, from 1890 to 2005.

== Oldest Dutch people ever ==
Deceased Living

| Rank | Name | Sex | Birth date | Death date | Age | Birthplace | Place of Death or Residence |
|---|---|---|---|---|---|---|---|
| 1 | Hendrikje van Andel-Schipper | F | 29 June 1890 | 30 August 2005 | 115 years, 62 days | Drenthe | Drenthe |
| 2 | Geertje Kuijntjes | F | 19 July 1905 | 24 December 2019 | 114 years, 158 days | South Holland | South Holland |
| 3 | Anne Brasz-Later | F | 16 July 1906 | 2 September 2020 | 114 years, 48 days | Zeeland | Utrecht |
| 4 | Catharina van Dam-Groeneveld | F | 20 November 1887 | 16 February 2001 | 113 years, 88 days | South Holland | South Holland |
| 5 | Grietje Jansen-Anker | F | 12 September 1897 | 13 October 2009 | 112 years, 31 days | Zeeland | South Holland |
| 6 | Elizabeth Philippina van Boven-Smaal | F | 5 January 1915 | Living | 111 years, 297 days | South Holland | South Holland |
| 7 | Egbertje Leutscher-de Vries | F | 22 October 1902 | 14 August 2014 | 111 years, 296 days | Drenthe | Drenthe |
| 8 | Jan Machiel Reyskens | M | 11 May 1878 | 7 January 1990 | 111 years, 241 days | Belgium | South Holland |
| 9 | Nellie van der Meulen | F | 15 February 1881 | 11 September 1992 | 111 years, 209 days | Friesland | United States |
| 10 | Jan Pieter Bos | M | 12 July 1891 | 15 December 2002 | 111 years, 156 days | South Holland | South Holland |
| 11 | Catherina van der Linden | F | 26 August 1912 | 26 January 2024 | 111 years, 153 days | Utrecht | Australia |
| 12 | Alexandrina van Donkelaar-Vink | F | 31 January 1895 | 19 May 2006 | 111 years, 108 days | South Holland | Utrecht |
| 13 | Maria Luisa Benjamin | F | 23 July 1910 | 1 November 2021 | 111 years, 101 days | Saint Kitts and Nevis (Note: Benjamin was born in Saint Kitts and Nevis, which were then part of the colony of the British Leeward Islands and became independent in 1983.) | Aruba |
| 14 | Jan van Ierland | M | 5 May 1914 | 21 July 2025 | 111 years, 77 days | North Brabant | North Holland |
| 15 | Adriana Hartog-van den Berg | F | 26 September 1915 | Living | 111 years, 33 days | Utrecht | Utrecht |
| 16 | Christina van Druten-Hoogakker | F | 20 November 1876 | 8 December 1987 | 111 years, 18 days | Gelderland | Gelderland |
| 17 | Johanna Francina Giezen-Zandstra | F | 7 September 1882 | 16 September 1993 | 111 years, 9 days | Friesland | South Holland |
| 18 | Marina Femke van der Es-Siewers | F | 4 March 1913 | 11 March 2024 | 111 years, 7 days | North Holland | North Holland |
| 19 | Catharina Hendrina Peters-Keultjes | F | 14 March 1898 | 20 March 2009 | 111 years, 6 days | Gelderland | Gelderland |
| 20 | Maria Simonis | F | 5 January 1909 | 3 January 2020 | 110 years, 363 days | South Holland | South Holland |
| 21 | Sietje Cornelia Hof | F | 7 January 1901 | 23 December 2011 | 110 years, 350 days | South Holland | United States |
| 22 | Heleen Mackenbach | F | 29 December 1912 | 3 December 2023 | 110 years, 339 days | South Holland | South Holland |
| 23 | Gerritdina Schellevis-Slaghuis | F | 12 December 1890 | 13 November 2001 | 110 years, 336 days | Overijssel | Overijssel |
| 24 | Ebeltje Boekema-Hut | F | 31 August 1911 | 11 June 2022 | 110 years, 284 days | Groningen | Groningen |
| 25 | Johanna Boost-Dalloyaux | F | 28 August 1898 | 1 June 2009 | 110 years, 277 days | North Holland | North Holland |
| 26 | Mathilde Ebberink-Vonk | F | 21 May 1909 | 19 January 2020 | 110 years, 243 days | Overijssel | Overijssel |
| 27 | Cornelia Hendrikse-Maas | F | 2 December 1885 | 15 July 1996 | 110 years, 226 days | Zeeland | North Brabant |
| 28 | Cornelia Boonstra-van der Bijl | F | 6 October 1910 | 15 May 2021 | 110 years, 221 days | Gelderland | Gelderland |
| 29 | Johanna Hendrika van Dommelen-Hamer | F | 20 October 1885 | 7 May 1996 | 110 years, 200 days | Gelderland | Gelderland |
| 30 | Petronella Maria Ribbens-Verstallen | F | 2 February 1873 | 22 July 1983 | 110 years, 170 days | North Brabant | Limburg |
| 30 | Margaretha Eijken | F | 12 November 1875 | 1 May 1986 | 110 years, 170 days | North Holland | North Holland |
| 32 | Maria Pieternella Platteel-Klingeman | F | 2 June 1915 | 1 November 2025 | 110 years, 152 days | South Holland | South Holland |
| 33 | Sara van Grondelle-Blom | F | 6 December 1892 | 4 May 2003 | 110 years, 149 days | Utrecht | Utrecht |
| 34 | Gerarda Hurenkamp-Bosgoed | F | 5 January 1870 | 25 May 1980 | 110 years, 141 days | Gelderland | Gelderland |
| 35 | Geert Adriaans Boomgaard | M | 21 September 1788 | 3 February 1899 | 110 years, 135 days | Groningen | Groningen |
| 36 | Willemina Everdina Hol | F | 3 February 1898 | 5 June 2008 | 110 years, 123 days | Gelderland | Gelderland |
| 37 | Nellij Hendrika Marie de Vries-Lammerts | F | 5 May 1905 | 27 August 2015 | 110 years, 114 days | South Holland | Utrecht |
| 38 | Maria Duijkersloot | F | 2 March 1909 | 21 June 2019 | 110 years, 111 days | North Holland | North Holland |
| 39 | Cornelis Jacobus Geurtz | M | 4 May 1902 | 21 August 2012 | 110 years, 109 days | South Holland | South Holland |
| 40 | Alida Suzanna Harst-Mathijssen | F | 31 December 1905 | 11 April 2016 | 110 years, 102 days | North Holland | South Holland |
| 41 | Hendrika Driessen-van Gasteren | F | 4 February 1906 | 5 May 2016 | 110 years, 91 days | South Holland | North Holland |
| 42 | Antonia Plaat-Kolenbrander | F | 6 January 1898 | 9 March 2008 | 110 years, 63 days | Utrecht | South Holland |
| 43 | Geertje Roelinga-de Groot | F | 29 June 1887 | 14 August 1997 | 110 years, 46 days | Friesland | Friesland |
| 44 | Frederika Louiza van Asselt-Benkemper | F | 16 November 1874 | 27 December 1984 | 110 years, 41 days | North Holland | Utrecht |
| 45 | Johanna Maria Besseling-Levers | F | 11 August 1909 | 14 September 2019 | 110 years, 34 days | Germany | Gelderland |
| 46 | Ann Jemimia Flower | F | 8 July 1885 | 9 August 1995 | 110 years, 32 days | Gelderland | Gelderland |
| 47 | Wilhelmina Hoorn | F | 6 November 1903 | 30 November 2013 | 110 years, 24 days | Limburg | United States |
| 48 | Wilhelmina Cammel | F | 8 January 1871 | 24 January 1981 | 110 years, 16 days | North Brabant | North Holland |
| 49 | Margretha Hogenhout-van Kerkhof | F | 28 August 1905 | 8 September 2015 | 110 years, 11 days | North Holland | North Holland |
| 50 | Christina Karnebeek-Backs | F | 2 October 1849 | 7 October 1959 | 110 years, 5 days | Gelderland | Gelderland |
