= Slobozia Nouă =

Slobozia Nouă may refer to several places in Romania:

- Slobozia Nouă, a village in Stănișești Commune, Bacău County
- Slobozia Nouă, a district in the town of Slobozia, Ialomița County

and a village in Moldova:

- Slobozia Nouă, a village in Tătărăuca Veche Commune, Soroca district
