= List of Norwegian supercentenarians =

People from Norway who have attained or surpassed the age of 110 years

Norwegian supercentenarians are citizens, residents or emigrants from Norway who have attained or surpassed 110 years of age. The Gerontology Research Group (GRG) has validated the longevity claims of 17 Norwegian supercentenarians, including 12 residents and 5 emigrants. The oldest known Norwegian was Maren Bolette Torp, who died in 1989, aged 112 years, 61 days. The oldest Norwegian man was Herman Smith-Johannsen, credited for introducing cross-country skiing to Canada and North America, who lived 111 years, 204 days from 1875 to 1987.

== Oldest Norwegians ==
Deceased Living

Rank	Name	Sex	Birth Date	Death Date	Age	Birthplace	Place of Death or Residence
1	Maren Bolette Torp	F	21 December 1876	20 February 1989	112 years, 61 days	Østlandet	Østlandet
2	Elisabet Ekenæs	F	26 December 1904	4 January 2017	112 years, 9 days	Østlandet	Østlandet
3	Lina Anundsen	F	12 November 1914	2 August 2026	111 years, 263 days	Østlandet	Østlandet
4	Herman Smith-Johannsen	M	15 June 1875	5 January 1987	111 years, 204 days	Østlandet	Østlandet
5	Laura Svehaug	F	19 November 1886	6 March 1998	111 years, 107 days	Vestlandet	Vestlandet
6	Wilhelmine Sande	F	24 October 1874	21 January 1986	111 years, 89 days	Østlandet	Sweden
7	Julia Lyng	F	22 December 1878	26 February 1990	111 years, 66 days	Trøndelag	United States
8	Margit Larsen	F	12 November 1914	27 December 2025	111 years, 45 days	Vestlandet	Vestlandet
9	Edna Moum	F	12 October 1915	Living	111 years, 39 days	Sørlandet	Østlandet
10	Gunhild Foerster	F	28 December 1893	4 February 2005	111 years, 38 days	Østlandet	United States
11	Nels Berger	M	20 October 1885	22 September 1996	110 years, 338 days	Østlandet	United States
12	Gudrun Omdahl Onshuus	F	17 July 1899	9 June 2010	110 years, 327 days	Østlandet	Østlandet
13	Anna Swenson	F	5 October 1860	18 June 1971	110 years, 256 days	Vestlandet	United States
14	Gudrun Nymoen	F	26 October 1910	8 July 2021	110 years, 255 days	Østlandet	Østlandet
15	Helene Andrea Nilsen	F	7 April 1901	31 October 2011	110 years, 207 days	Østlandet	Østlandet
16	Ingeborg Johanna Mestad	F	15 December 1899	5 June 2010	110 years, 172 days	Vestlandet	Vestlandet
17	Olav Hovatn	M	23 October 1892	26 April 2003	110 years, 185 days	Sørlandet	Sørlandet
18	Helga Samuelsen	F	26 June 1914	14 December 2024	110 years, 171 days	Sørlandet	United States
19	Marie Antoinette Andersen	F	29 September 1909	16 February 2020	110 years, 140 days	Nord-Norge	Nord-Norge
20	Velgjer Svien	F	10 October 1842	23 January 1953	110 years, 105 days	Østlandet	United States
21	Borghild Nilsen	F	2 December 1893	3 March 2004	110 years, 92 days	Østlandet	Østlandet
22	Ingemund Peterson	M	6 June 1894	21 August 2004	110 years, 76 days	Østlandet	United States
23	Jenny Lindefjeld	F	17 April 1905	28 June 2015	110 years, 72 days	Sørlandet	Sørlandet
24	Karen Svisdal	F	16 December 1889	23 February 2000	110 years, 69 days	Vestlandet	Vestlandet
25	Kristianna Ullaland	F	2 December 1878	26 January 1989	110 years, 55 days	Vestlandet	Vestlandet
26	Petra Høgetveit	F	3 April 1910	23 May 2020	110 years, 50 days	Østlandet	Østlandet
27	Harriet Holm	F	13 November 1893	22 December 2003	110 years, 39 days	Østlandet	Østlandet
28	Aslaug Thoresen	F	24 July 1915	22 August 2025	110 years, 29 days	Østlandet	Østlandet
29	Asne Hustveit	F	2 December 1879	17 December 1989	110 years, 15 days	Østlandet	Østlandet
