= Hero of Labour of Mongolia =

State award

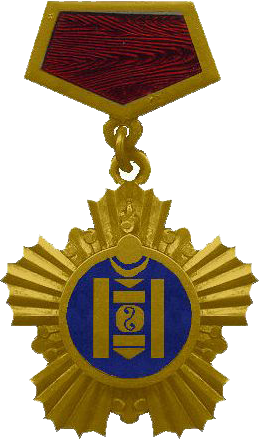
Breastplate of the title

The title of Hero of Labour of Mongolia (Mongolian: Монгол улсын хөдөлмөрийн баатар), formerly known as the Hero of Labour of the Mongolian People's Republic, was a state decoration of the Mongolian People's Republic and is an award of Mongolia. It is the highest state award given to those with outstanding achievements in the development of the country.

== History ==
By the decree of the Presidium of the Great People's Khural of the MPR on 31 December 1956, the title was established. The decree stipulates that the winners of the title will be awarded the Order of Sukhbaatar and the “Golden Soyombo” medal. The first awardee was awarded in 1957 to D. Davaajav, an excavator at the Nalaikh mine. Then, in 1958, N. Byambatsogt, a tractor driver from Yeroogiin State Farm, Z. Ochir, a shepherd from Bulgan Province in 1959, and A. Avirmed, a milkman from the Batsumber state farm, were awarded this title. According to the 1992 Constitution, the name of the country was changed to “Mongolia”, and since then, the similar title of Hero of Labor of Mongolia has been awarded. A total of 170 people were awarded this title.

== Notable recipients ==
- Leonid Brezhnev
- Andriyan Nikolayev
- Valentina Tereshkova
- Yumjaagiin Tsedenbal
- Jamsrangiin Sambuu
- Ivan Presnyakov, Deputy of the Liskinsky District City Council
- Maidarjavyn Ganzorig
- Soronzonboldyn Battsetseg
- Paavan Damdin, former member of the Politburo of the MPRP's Central Committee
- Namsrayn Suvd, actor
- Dolgorsürengiin Dagvadorj, sumo wrestler
- Bazaryn Shirendev

== See also ==
- Orders, decorations, and medals of Mongolia
