= Vitantonio Lovallo =

Italian supercentenarian (1914–2026)

- Born: 28 March 1914; Avigliano, Basilicata, Italy
- Died: 15 September 2026 (aged 112 years, 171 days); Avigliano, Basilicata, Italy
- Known for: Oldest living World War II veteran (27 May 2026 – 15 September 2026); Oldest living man in Italy (31 March 2024 – 15 September 2026); Second oldest living person in Italy (17 February 2026 – 15 September 2026); Oldest living European man (27 May 2026 – 15 September 2026)
- Children: 4

Vitantonio Lovallo (28 March 1914 – 15 September 2026) was an Italian veteran and supercentenarian. His age was confirmed by the Gerontology Research Group (GRG), LongeviQuest (LQ), and the European Supercentenarian Organisation (ESO). On 27 May 2026, following the death of Ilie Ciocan, he became the oldest living man in Europe and the oldest living veteran of World War II. He was also the oldest living man in Italy, the third oldest living man in the world, after João Marinho Neto and Ken Weeks and the second oldest person in Italy, after Lucia Laura Sangenito.

== Biography ==
Vitantonio Lovallo was born in Avigliano, Basilicata, Italy on 28 March 1914. From the age of 16, he worked as a shepherd and helped his family in the wheat and corn fields.

He married in 1936 (his wife died in 2015 at the age of 98). They had four children, two girls and two boys (one of whom died a few months after birth from meningitis).

During World War II, he was sent to the front and was captured in Greece by German troops on 8 September 1943. After his release on 8 May 1945, he returned home and found work as a mule-haulier of wood.

Lovallo remained a hard worker throughout his life, retiring only in his late nineties. In his 100s, Lovallo tended his vineyards and herded his sheep every morning. Lovallo himself attributed his longevity to his lack of stress and his focus on life. At the age of 108, he received his fourth dose of the COVID-19 vaccine.

In May 2026, Lovallo received the 80th Anniversary Medal directly from the Coldiretti association's leadership as a tribute to his achievements as the association's longest-serving member.

On 15 September 2026, Lovallo died in his home in Avigliano, at the age of 112 years and 171 days. His funeral took place on 17 September, in the Church of San Vincenzo Ferrer in Sarnelli. He was succeeded as Italy's oldest living man by 109-year-old Angelo Peressini.

== See also ==
- List of the verified oldest people
