= List of Brazilian supercentenarians =

People from Brazil who have attained or surpassed the age of 110 years

Brazilian supercentenarians are citizens, residents or emigrants from Brazil who have attained or surpassed 110 years of age. Organizations that specialize in extreme age verification, such as the Gerontology Research Group (GRG) and LongeviQuest, have validated the longevity claims of Brazilian supercentenarians.

The oldest validated Brazilian person ever is Francisca Celsa dos Santos, who died in 2021, aged 116 years and 349 days. The oldest validated Brazilian man ever is João Marinho Neto, who is living at the age of 114 years, 48 days and is additionally the oldest living man in the world. However, the age claim of Anísio Rodrigues Alves, who died in 2009, aged 116 years and 229 days, is currently pending validation by the GRG; if his age is true, he would be the oldest man ever, living 175 days longer than Jiroemon Kimura.

== 100 oldest known Brazilians ==
This list includes Brazilian supercentenarians whose ages have been recognized by the Gerontology Research Group (GRG) or LongeviQuest. Cases are sourced from GRG data or LongeviQuest directory profiles.

Deceased Living

Rank	Name	Sex	Birth Date	Death Date	Age	Birthplace	Place of Death or Residence
1	Francisca Celsa dos Santos	F	21 October 1904	5 October 2021	116 years, 349 days	Ceará	Ceará
2	Inah Canabarro Lucas	F	8 June 1908	30 April 2025	116 years, 326 days	Rio Grande do Sul	Rio Grande do Sul
3	Antonia da Santa Cruz	F	13 June 1905	23 January 2022	116 years, 224 days	Bahia	Bahia
4	Yolanda Beltrão de Azevedo	F	13 January 1911	Living	115 years, 313 days	Alagoas	Alagoas
5	Beatriz Ferreira Duarte	F	21 June 1911	Living	115 years, 154 days	Pernambuco	Pernambuco
6	Maria Gomes Valentim	F	9 July 1896	21 June 2011	114 years, 347 days	Minas Gerais	Minas Gerais
7	Izabel Rosa Pereira	F	13 October 1910	24 September 2025	114 years, 346 days	Minas Gerais	Minas Gerais
8	Eleonora Camargo Veiga	F	14 August 1901	7 March 2016	114 years, 206 days	Paraná	Rio de Janeiro
9	Ana Nogueira de Luca	F	21 June 1896	18 November 2010	114 years, 150 days	Minas Gerais	Minas Gerais
10	Maria Paschoalina de Castro	F	2 May 1911	5 August 2025	114 years, 95 days	Minas Gerais	Minas Gerais
11	João Marinho Neto	M	5 October 1912	Living	114 years, 48 days	Ceará	Ceará
12	Maria Jorge Esteves de Almeida	F	28 May 1912	8 July 2026	114 years, 41 days	Portugal	São Paulo
13	Placida Maria do Livramento	F	3 October 1895	24 October 2009	114 years, 21 days	Piauí	Piauí
14	Luzia Mohrs	F	23 March 1904	16 October 2017	113 years, 207 days	Germany	Rio Grande do Sul
15	Álida Victória Grubba-Rudge	F	10 July 1903	23 December 2016	113 years, 166 days	Santa Catarina	Santa Catarina
15	Mariana Penna Monteiro	F	2 September 1912	15 February 2026	113 years, 166 days	São Paulo	São Paulo
17	Amalia Gomes Dantas	F	6 December 1908	18 April 2022	113 years, 133 days	Paraíba	Pernambuco
18	Luisa Maggioni	F	19 July 1913	Living	113 years, 126 days	Espírito Santo	Espírito Santo
19	Josepha Pomares Camargo	F	21 April 1911	18 June 2024	113 years, 58 days	Rio Grande do Sul	Paraná
20	Anonymous	F	6 July 1912	18 July 2025	113 years, 12 days	Japan	São Paulo
21	Josefina Neto de Assis Silveira	F	22 March 1902	24 March 2015	113 years, 2 days	Minas Gerais	São Paulo
22	Rosa Maria Scapol Barbosa	F	26 May 1902	4 May 2015	112 years, 343 days	São Paulo	São Paulo
23	G. M. de A. F.	F	12 April 1911	18 March 2024	112 years, 341 days	Ceará	Ceará
24	Maria Alaíde Menezes	F	5 July 1912	30 March 2025	112 years, 268 days	Sergipe	Sergipe
25	Izabel Emiliana de Oliveira	F	26 August 1900	4 May 2013	112 years, 251 days	Rio Grande do Norte	Rio Grande do Norte
25	Henriqueta Soares Marques	F	6 May 1911	12 January 2024	112 years, 251 days	São Paulo	São Paulo
27	Josefa Maria da Conceição	F	4 April 1914	Living	112 years, 232 days	Paraíba	Paraíba
28	Delio Venturotti	M	25 October 1909	1 June 2022	112 years, 219 days	Italy	Santa Catarina
29	Maria de Paiva Pereira	F	26 December 1907	1 July 2020	112 years, 188 days	Minas Gerais	Minas Gerais
30	Josino Levino Ferreira	M	3 April 1913	5 October 2025	112 years, 185 days	Paraíba	Rio Grande do Norte
31	Maria Rosa de Faria Guimarães	F	21 April 1893	29 September 2005	112 years, 161 days	Santa Catarina	Santa Catarina
32	João Zanol	M	13 October 1907	12 February 2020	112 years, 122 days	Espírito Santo	Espírito Santo
33	Isa Ferreira da Costa Araújo	F	18 April 1914	6 August 2026	112 years, 110 days	Rio de Janeiro	Rio de Janeiro
34	Josephina Maria da Conceição Souza	F	25 September 1910	8 January 2023	112 years, 105 days	Rio de Janeiro	Rio de Janeiro
35	Jandyra Faria dos Santos	F	23 August 1914	Living	112 years, 91 days	Espírito Santo	Espírito Santo
36	Frida Bischof Ferreira de Carvalho	F	31 August 1914	Living	112 years, 83 days	São Paulo	São Paulo
37	Iracema França Pedrosa	F	2 June 1913	25 July 2025	112 years, 53 days	Santa Catarina	Santa Catarina
38	Auta Pinto da Silva	F	28 January 1911	6 March 2023	112 years, 37 days	São Paulo	São Paulo
39	Dolores Pasquini Boscardin	F	27 October 1897	30 November 2009	112 years, 34 days	Paraná	Paraná
40	Irene Lanna	F	11 June 1903	14 July 2015	112 years, 33 days	Minas Gerais	Minas Gerais
41	Zelinda Furlanetto Finotti	F	19 May 1908	18 June 2020	112 years, 30 days	São Paulo	Minas Gerais
42	Elvira Maurno Valladão	F	31 December 1911	29 December 2023	111 years, 363 days	São Paulo	São Paulo
43	Primo Olivieri	M	7 March 1914	11 February 2026	111 years, 341 days	São Paulo	São Paulo
44	Francisco Ernesto Filho	M	5 April 1914	6 March 2026	111 years, 335 days	Paraíba	Rio de Janeiro
45	Camilia Gonçalves	F	23 October 1911	21 August 2023	111 years, 302 days	Portugal	São Paulo
46	Anonymous	F	21 November 1909	8 September 2021	111 years, 291 days	Unknown	Unknown
47	Anna Ribeiro Sicupira	F	6 May 1909	11 February 2021	111 years, 281 days	Paraná	Paraná
48	Adelina Chelles Chevitarese	F	8 June 1903	29 January 2015	111 years, 235 days	Minas Gerais	Rio de Janeiro
49	Beatriz de Oliveira Soares	F	20 May 1899	13 December 2010	111 years, 207 days	São Paulo	São Paulo
50	Nair Fonseca Dias	F	17 November 1914	31 May 2026	111 years, 195 days	Minas Gerais	Minas Gerais
51	Marthe Merlino	F	12 March 1898	22 September 2009	111 years, 194 days	São Paulo	France
52	Maria Liesse Callou Duarte	F	2 January 1914	10 July 2025	111 years, 189 days	Ceará	Ceará
53	Maria José Guimarães	F	16 April 1915	1 October 2026	111 years, 168 days	Rio de Janeiro	Rio de Janeiro
54	Noemia Vieira de Souza	F	6 April 1912	26 August 2023	111 years, 142 days	Rio de Janeiro	Rio de Janeiro
55	Nora Ettori	F	5 April 1907	22 August 2018	111 years, 139 days	São Paulo	Italy
56	Jorgina Lima da Cunha	F	21 August 1915	Living	111 years, 93 days	São Paulo	São Paulo
57	Júlia Nóbrega	F	28 May 1912	13 August 2023	111 years, 77 days	Paraíba	Paraíba
58	Clelia Valentina dos Santos	F	24 March 1915	6 June 2026	111 years, 74 days	Rio de Janeiro	Rio de Janeiro
59	Cândida Rodrigues de Jesus	F	26 January 1867	12 March 1978	111 years, 45 days	Minas Gerais	Minas Gerais
60	Eunice Anício da Silveira	F	21 October 1915	Living	111 years, 32 days	Minas Gerais	Minas Gerais
61	Francisca de Paula Faria Figueiredo	F	2 April 1898	30 April 2009	111 years, 28 days	Rio de Janeiro	Mato Grosso
62	Moacyr Nunes Barroso	M	31 March 1909	20 April 2020	111 years, 20 days	Minas Gerais	Minas Gerais
63	Silvina Alves	F	3 November 1915	Living	111 years, 19 days	Rio Grande do Norte	Rio Grande do Norte
64	Fiorinda Rogante de Godoy	F	7 May 1913	20 May 2024	111 years, 13 days	São Paulo	São Paulo
65	Yoshi Matsumoto	F	7 April 1914	6 April 2025	110 years, 364 days	Japan	São Paulo
66	Otoji Hasegawa	M	3 December 1915	Living	110 years, 354 days	Japan	São Paulo
67	Raquel de Albuquerque Silva	F	5 December 1915	Living	110 years, 352 days	Bahia	Bahia
68	Olga de Almeida Fiúza	F	3 November 1901	12 October 2012	110 years, 344 days	Minas Gerais	Minas Gerais
69	Joaquim Saraiva Lessa	M	12 September 1904	16 August 2015	110 years, 338 days	Minas Gerais	Minas Gerais
70	Assumpta Tortorella	F	5 March 1903	2 February 2014	110 years, 334 days	São Paulo	São Paulo
70	Oliva Pereira Alves Jacobsen	F	23 April 1908	23 March 2019	110 years, 334 days	Rio Grande do Sul	Rio Grande do Sul
72	Gracia dos Santos Pinto	F	4 September 1913	27 July 2024	110 years, 327 days	São Paulo	São Paulo
73	Dr. Maria Iolanda Vecchio Mauricio Viana	F	9 September 1914	9 July 2025	110 years, 303 days	Minas Gerais	Minas Gerais
74	Maria Isabel da Conceicao	F	23 March 1915	16 January 2026	110 years, 299 days	Rio Grande do Norte	Rio Grande do Norte
75	Francisco Simão de Lima	M	10 January 1916	4 November 2026	110 years, 298 days	Ceará	Ceará
76	Artelina Tinoco Alves	F	2 December 1914	19 September 2025	110 years, 291 days	Rio de Janeiro	Rio de Janeiro
77	Joaquina de França Rodrigues	F	6 February 1916	Living	110 years, 289 days	Paraná	Paraná
78	Laurita Pereira Donadio	F	22 April 1905	24 January 2016	110 years, 277 days	São Paulo	Rio Grande do Sul
79	Ariovalda Duarte de Araújo	F	21 June 1907	12 March 2018	110 years, 264 days	Minas Gerais	Minas Gerais
80	Iracema Camargo de Araujo	F	5 October 1914	24 June 2025	110 years, 262 days	São Paulo	São Paulo
81	Jovita Maria de Jesus	F	4 December 1904	18 August 2015	110 years, 257 days	Minas Gerais	Goiás
82	Salustiana Tereza de Jesus	F	8 June 1912	13 February 2023	110 years, 250 days	Ceará	Ceará
83	Luisa Rocha Vieira	F	19 March 1916	Living	110 years, 248 days	Ceará	Ceará
84	Olyra de Miranda Netto	F	6 September 1912	9 May 2023	110 years, 245 days	Rio Grande do Sul	Rio Grande do Sul
85	João Izidoro Cândido Sobrinho	M	11 March 1913	1 November 2023	110 years, 235 days	Pernambuco	Pernambuco
86	Isabel de Salles Penteado	F	3 June 1894	23 January 2005	110 years, 234 days	São Paulo	São Paulo
87	Geralda Aloy	F	27 January 1905	16 September 2015	110 years, 232 days	Rio Grande do Sul	Rio Grande do Sul
87	Dalcisa Bozzi Carvalho	F	4 April 1916	Living	110 years, 232 days	Espírito Santo	Espírito Santo
89	Olivia da Silva	F	25 July 1909	10 March 2020	110 years, 229 days	Santa Catarina	Santa Catarina
90	Benvindo Ferreira de Oliveira	M	10 August 1914	25 March 2025	110 years, 227 days	Minas Gerais	Minas Gerais
91	A. C.	F	18 September 1908	29 April 2019	110 years, 223 days	Pernambuco	Pernambuco
92	Anonymous	F	12 April 1909	14 November 2019	110 years, 216 days	Unknown	Santa Catarina
93	Maria Balbina Régis Alexandre	F	29 March 1902	20 October 2012	110 years, 205 days	Santa Catarina	Santa Catarina
94	João Paulo de Souza	M	16 June 1902	20 December 2012	110 years, 187 days	Rio Grande do Norte	Rio Grande do Norte
94	Maria José de Vasconcelos	F	27 August 1915	2 March 2026	110 years, 187 days	Ceará	Ceará
96	N. de A. M.	F	17 June 1902	19 December 2012	110 years, 185 days	Rio de Janeiro	Rio de Janeiro
96	Anonymous	F	9 July 1912	10 January 2023	110 years, 185 days	São Paulo	São Paulo
98	Marie Monet	F	25 July 1904	24 January 2015	110 years, 183 days	São Paulo	São Paulo
99	Maria Ercília Guião Mendes de Quadros	F	31 May 1916	Living	110 years, 175 days	São Paulo	São Paulo
100	Maria Aparecida Pires Daher	F	5 November 1910	26 April 2021	110 years, 172 days	Rio de Janeiro	Rio de Janeiro
100	Geraldo Rezende Trindade	M	3 June 1916	Living	110 years, 172 days	Minas Gerais	Minas Gerais
