= Inah Canabarro Lucas =

Brazilian supercentenarian (1908–2025)

Sister Inah Canabarro Lucas
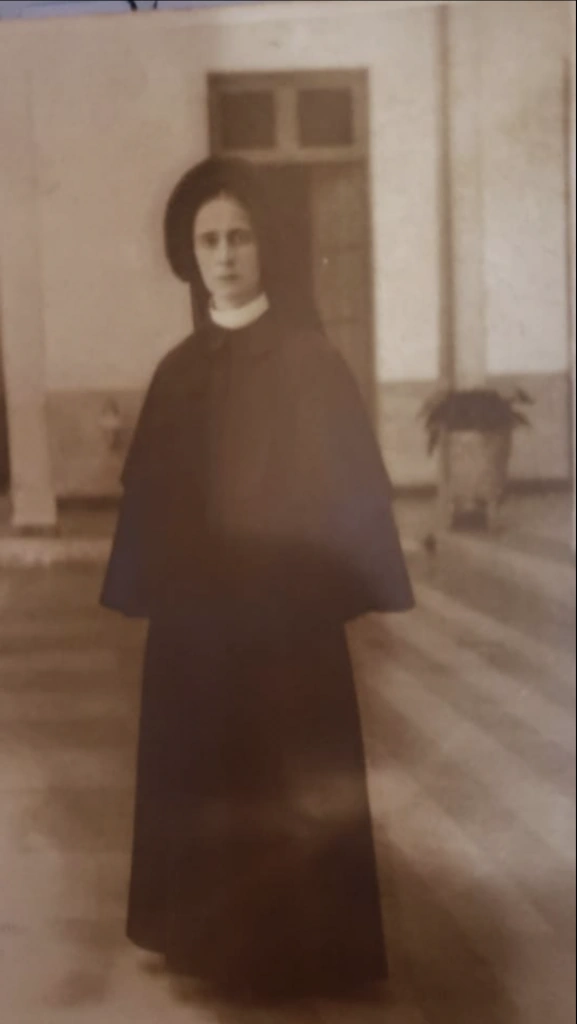
- Canabarro Lucas in the c. 1920s or 1930s
- Born: Inah Canabarro Lucas; 8 June 1908 (Note: Lucas claimed to have been born on 27 May 1908, but was verified as being born 12 days later.); São Francisco de Assis, Rio Grande do Sul, Brazil
- Died: 30 April 2025 (aged 116 years, 326 days); Porto Alegre, Rio Grande do Sul, Brazil
- Known for: Oldest verified living person (29 December 2024 – 30 April 2025)
- Family: David Canabarro (great-grandfather)

Inah Canabarro Lucas (Portuguese pronunciation: [iˈna kanaˈbaʁu ˈlukɐs]; 8 June 1908 – 30 April 2025) was a Brazilian Catholic nun and supercentenarian. At the age of 116 years, 326 days, she was the world's oldest verified living person after the death of Tomiko Itooka in 2024, until her own death on 30 April 2025.

One of the first Brazilian nuns of the Teresian Sisters, she taught several subjects at Teresian schools in Brazil and Uruguay. She assisted in establishing marching bands at two schools, including the 115-instrument band at the Colégio Santa Teresa that performed across Brazil, Uruguay, and Argentina. Lucas was celebrated for her longevity several times, including in a 2018 letter from Pope Francis.

== Biography ==
Inah Canabarro Lucas was born on 8 June 1908 in São Francisco de Assis, Rio Grande do Sul, Brazil, to João Antonio Lucas and Mariana Canabarro. She was the great-granddaughter of General David Canabarro, who fought in the Ragamuffin War. She had a younger brother, Rube (1909–1987), who served as a Lieutenant Colonel Aviator in the Brazilian Air Force. As a child, she was very skinny, and many in her community did not think she would survive into adulthood. She was a lifelong fan of the football club SC Internacional, established in 1909.

Lucas was one of the first Brazilian nuns to join the Society of Saint Teresa of Jesus (Teresian Sisters of Brazil an order of Discalced Carmelites). She taught in schools of the Teresian Sisters in Rio de Janeiro, Itaqui, and Santana do Livramento where she taught Portuguese, mathematics, science, history, art, and religion. She worked as a kindergarten teacher at the Colégio Santa Teresa, having taught João Figueiredo, the last dictator of Brazil. She established the marching band at the Colégio Santa Teresa, which comprised 115 instruments and performed in across Brazil, Uruguay, and Argentina. She also assisted in establishing the marching band of the Liceu Pomoli (Pomoli School) in Rivera, Uruguay.

Pope Francis sent a message of congratulations to her on her 110th birthday. She became the oldest living person in Brazil following the death of Antonia da Santa Cruz (1905–2022) on 23 January 2022. In 2022, for Lucas's 114th birthday, the Teresian Sisters in Porto Alegre held a three-day celebration. In May 2023, the Archdiocese of Porto Alegre celebrated her 115th birthday.

She became the oldest living person in the world following the death of Tomiko Itooka on 29 December 2024.

Inah Canabarro Lucas died on 30 April 2025, at the age of 116 years and 326 days, at the Santo Enrique de Ossó Shelter of the Teresian Sisters. Following her death, Ethel Caterham of the United Kingdom became the world's oldest living person.

She is the second-oldest nun in history, behind Lucile Randon.

== See also ==
- List of Brazilian supercentenarians
- List of South American supercentenarians
- List of the verified oldest people
