= David Canabarro =

Brazilian general (1796–1867)

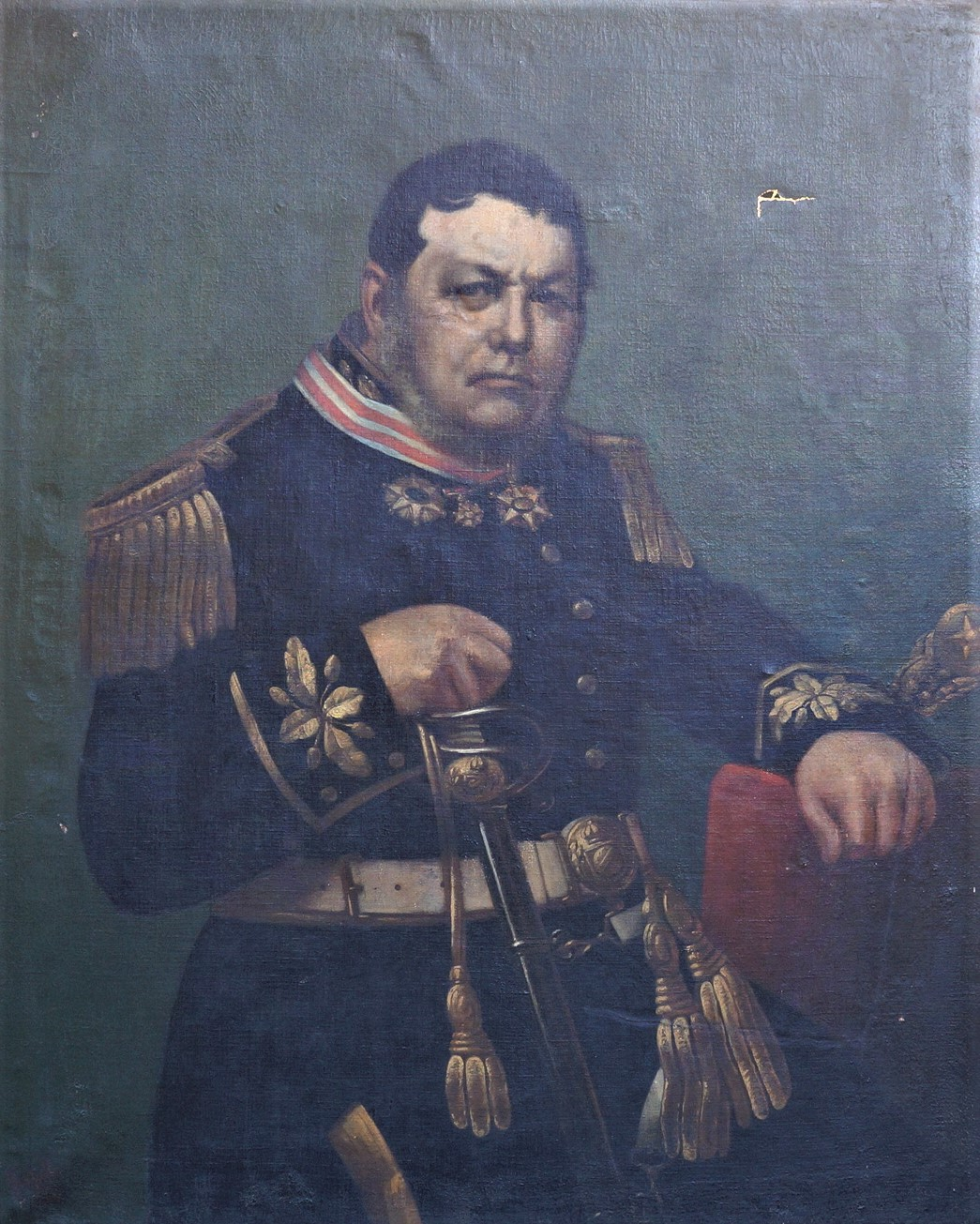
- Portrait by Bernardo Grasselli, 1865
- Born: David José Martins; 22 August 1796; Taquari, Captaincy of Rio Grande de São Pedro, Portuguese Empire
- Died: 12 April 1867 (aged 70); Santana do Livramento, Rio Grande do Sul, Brazil
- Relatives: Inah Canabarro Lucas (great-granddaughter)
- Military career
- Conflicts: See list: First Banda Oriental campaign; Second Banda Oriental campaign; Cisplatine War; Battle of Rincón; Battle of Ituzaingó; Ragamuffin War; Third siege of Porto Alegre; Capture of Laguna; Recapture of Laguna; Battle of Ponche Verde; Porongos Massacre; Platine War; Uruguayan War; Paraguayan War

David José Martins (22 August 1796 – 12 April 1867), known as David Canabarro, was a Brazilian general.

== Biography ==
Canabarro was born to José Martins Coelho (from Porto Alegre) and Mariana de Jesus Ignacia (from Santa Catarina).

The surname "Canabarro" came from his grandfather, Manuel Teodósio Ferreira, who received the nickname from Luís Teles da Silva Caminha e Meneses, 5th Marquis of Alegrete, and added it to his own name.

Canabarro was the great-grandfather of Inah Canabarro Lucas (1908–2025), who was the oldest verified living person in the world at the time of her death.

== Early military career ==
=== Campaigns in the Banda Oriental ===
Canabarro began his military career in the first campaign in the Banda Oriental of 1811–1812. David, at the age of fifteen, asked his father for permission to take his brother's place.

Canabarro fought for the forces of noble Dom Diogo de Sousa, the count of Rio Pardo. After the campaign he was promoted and returned home, though later he would fight in the second campaign in the Banda Oriental, from 1816 to 1820, that culminated in the annexation of the region as a province by the United Kingdom of Portugal, Brazil and the Algarves under the name of Cisplatina.

=== Cisplatine War ===
Years later, he was a lieutenant in the forces of Bento Gonçalves in the Cisplatine War in 1825–1828, which culminated in a peace treaty in August 1828 that granted independence to Uruguay. There he played an important role in the Battle of Rincón de las Gallinas, saving the Brazilian army on 24 September 1825. This earned him the title of Army lieutenant. He took part in the 21st Light Cavalry Brigade commanded by Bento Gonçalves in the Battle of Ituzaingó.

When the war ended, he continued his military career, this time associated with his uncle Antonio Ferreira Canabarro in the border region with Uruguay near Santana do Livramento. By 1836, he adopted the name Canabarro at the insistence of his uncle. As suggested by historian Ivo Santanese Caggiano: "he must have had some connection with the Machados and Ferreiras of Sabrosa. Consequently, the descendants of the noble Canavarros of Portugal must be the Canabarros of Brazil."

=== Ragamuffin War ===
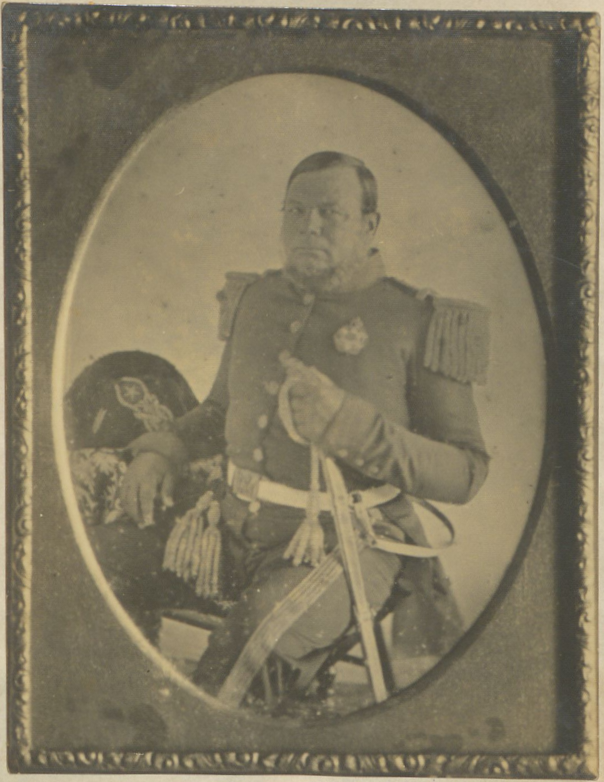
Canabarro, c. 1857–1867

Canabarro was initially neutral in the Ragamuffin War. He later enlisted as a lieutenant, but quickly rose through the ranks and took command in June 1843, when Bento Gonçalves, to avoid a split among Republicans, left the command and went on to serve under the orders of Canabarro.

His only defeat in war was in the Battle of Porongos, which relaxed the peace negotiations he undertook with the Baron of Caxias (later Duke). He was surprised by the troops of Mouringue and was defeated, notwithstanding his possession of the Black Lancers.

While negotiating peace with the Empire of Brazil, Canabarro offered his services to Juan Manuel de Rosas, ruler of the Argentine Confederation, who wanted to expand the borders of his country. In exchange for the cooperation of the Ragamuffin rebels, he would get help from Argentina to continue the war against the Empire. Canabarro responded by letter, where he stated his loyalty to the country.

As head of the rebels he accepted the amnesty offered by the government on 18 December 1844 by the Baron of Caxias, who came to be known as "the Peacemaker". In the negotiations on 25 February 1845, it was agreed that the Republicans would choose the next president of the province instead of having him be appointed by the central government in Rio de Janeiro. It was agreed that the imperial government would be held accountable for the republican government's debt; that rebel military officers who wished to join the imperial army would remain in their former posts, and that the prisoners would be pardoned.

== The Brazilian army ==
Canabarro fought in the Platine War and in the Uruguayan War, receiving the honorary title of "general" with which he fought in the Paraguayan War.

== Representations in popular culture ==
David Canabarro has been portrayed as a character in movies and television shows, played by Milton Mattos in the movie Neto Perde a Sua Alma (2001), and by Oscar Simch in the miniseries A Casa das Sete Mulheres (2003).

== Bibliography ==
- Porto Alegre, Achylles (1917). Illustrious Men of Rio Grande do Sul. Porto Alegre: Livraria Selbach.
- Caggiano, Ivo (1992). David Canabarro lieutenant of the general. Porto Alegre: Martin Book.
