= Maranguape =

Municipality in Ceará, Brazil

- Municipality
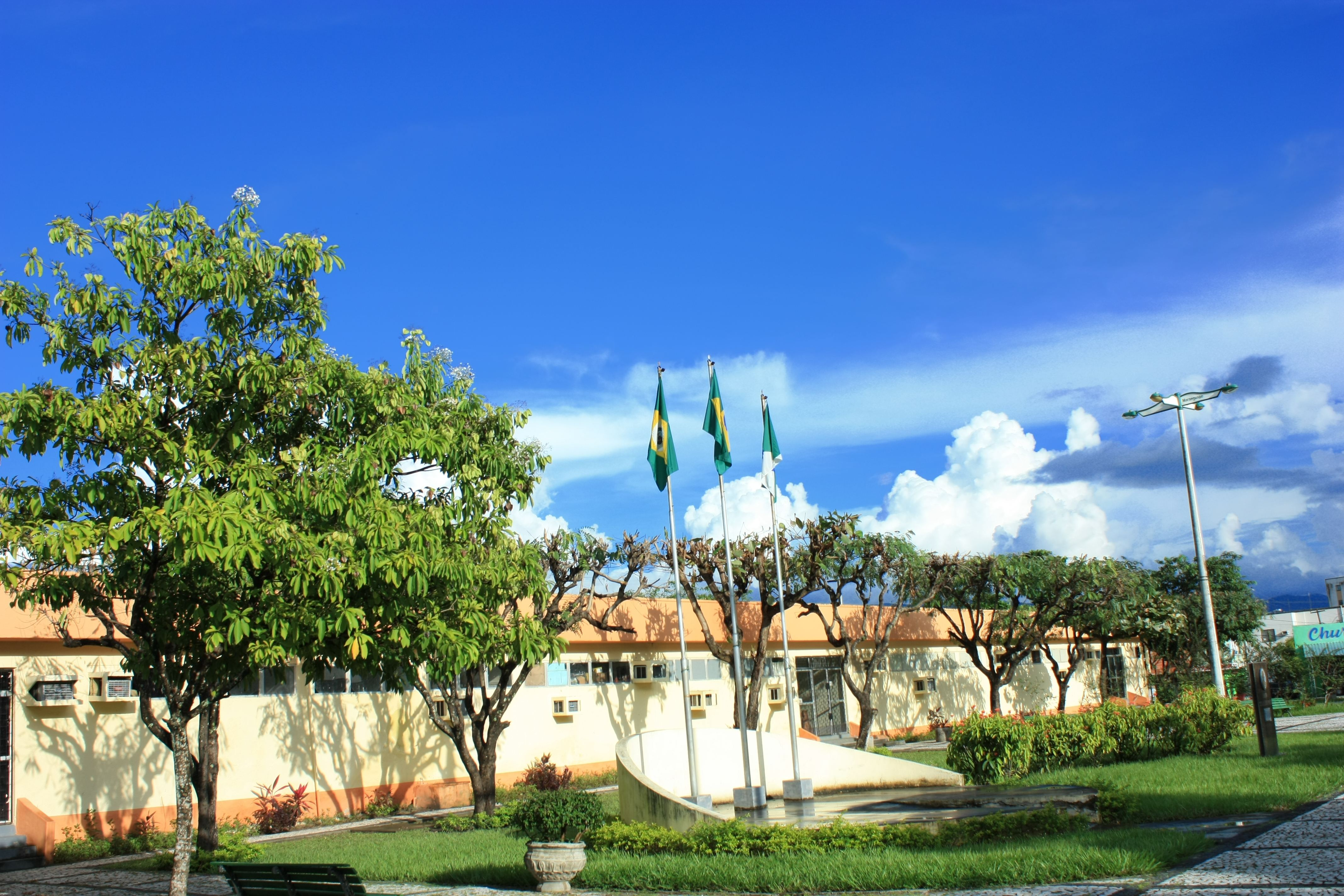
- Municipal office

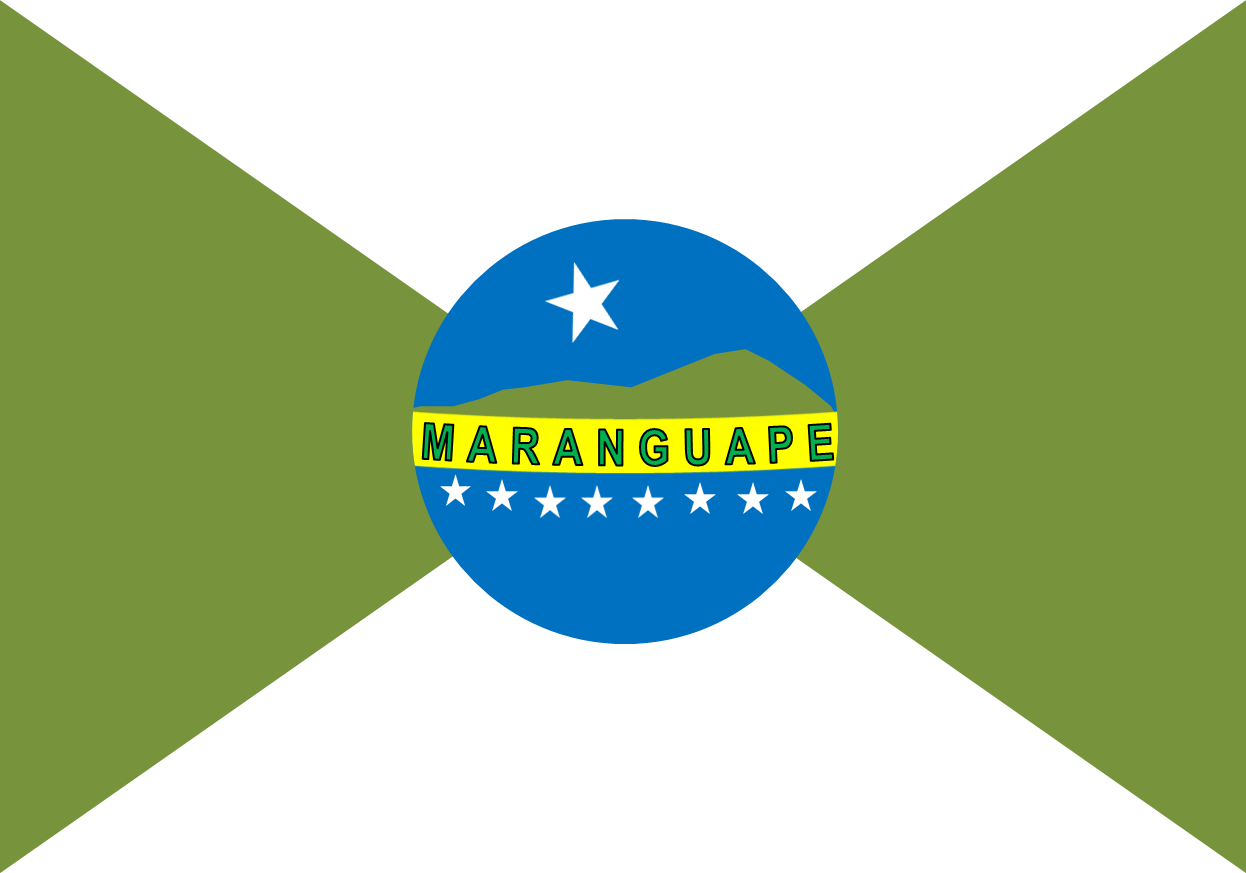
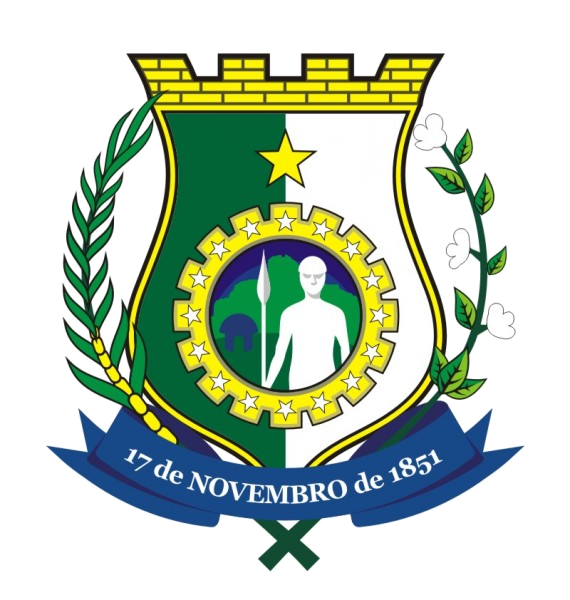
- Flag Coat of arms

- Location in Ceará state

- Location in Brazil
- Coordinates: 3°53′24″S 38°41′9″W
- Country: Brazil
- Region: Northeast
- State: Ceará

Area
  - Total: 590.873 km^{2} (228.137 sq mi)
- Elevation: 68 m (223 ft)

Population (2022 Census)
  - Total: 105.093
  - Estimate (2025): 108,622
  - Density: 0.177861/km^{2} (0.460657/sq mi)
- Time zone: UTC−3 (BRT)
- Website: http://www.maranguape.ce.gov.br/

Maranguape is a municipality in Ceará with a population of 105,093 (2022 Census). The community was founded in 1851. It is part of the Fortaleza metropolitan area.

== Notable people ==
- Capistrano de Abreu - Brazilian historian.
- Chico Anysio - Brazilian comedian.
- Teresa Santos - Miss Brazil 2021 and model.
- Lupe Gigliotti - Brazilian actress.
- João Marinho Neto - Brazilian supercentenarian, current oldest living man.
