= Beatriz Ferreira Duarte =

Brazilian supercentenarian (born 1911)

- Born: 21 June 1911 (age 115 years, 135 days); Moreno, Pernambuco, Brazil
- Known for: Second-oldest living Brazilian person
- Spouse: Amaro Cipriano Duarte (died 1991)
- Children: 8 (5 deceased)

Beatriz Ferreira Duarte (born 21 June 1911) is a Brazilian supercentenarian who is the second-oldest person in Brazil behind Yolanda Beltrão de Azevedo, and also the fifth-oldest living person in the world.

== Biography ==
Beatriz Ferreira Duarte was born on 21 June 1911 in Moreno, Pernambuco, Brazil. She had eleven siblings (nine sisters and two brothers). Her youngest and last surviving sister, Maria José, died aged 95 in 2021. She married Amaro Cipriano Duarte, and they remained in Jaboatão dos Guararapes. She dedicated herself entirely to her role as a homemaker and never worked outside the home. Together, they had eight children, but four died as newborns, and in 2019 her daughter Maria Auxiliadora (born 1949) died at age 70. She was widowed in 1991.

She often believed that she reached 100 years old due to her Catholic beliefs. Her family also believed her healthy diet in her childhood contributed to her longevity.
