= Maria Giuseppa Robucci =

Italian supercentenarian (1903–2019)

- Born: 20 March 1903; Poggio Imperiale, Apulia, Kingdom of Italy
- Died: 18 June 2019 (aged 116 years, 90 days); Poggio Imperiale, Apuila, Italy
- Spouse: Nicola Nargiso
- Children: 5

Maria Giuseppa Robucci (20 March 1903 – 18 June 2019) was an Italian supercentenarian who was, prior to her death aged 116, the second-oldest living person in the world behind Kane Tanaka.

== Biography ==
Robucci was born in 1903 in Poggio Imperiale, province of Foggia, Apulia region, Italy. Her parents were Antonio and Maria Michela Robucci. On 3 December 1928, she married Nicola Nargiso. The couple had five children named Angelo, Concetta, Antonio, Giuseppe, and Filomena. Nicola died in 1982. In 2003, her 100th birthday was featured in a television show called ”La vita in diretta” for the channel Rai Uno.

In 2014, Robucci broke her hip after a fall and underwent surgery. She credited her longevity to a good diet such as olive oil and tomatoes, having faith in God, avoiding alcohol and having a positive mindset. On 6 July 2018, she became the oldest person in Italy upon the death of 116-year-old Giuseppina Projetto-Frau.

On 18 June 2019, she died aged 116 years, 90 days in Poggio Imperiale.

== See also ==
- Emma Morano
