= Maria Branyas =

Catalan supercentenarian (1907–2024)

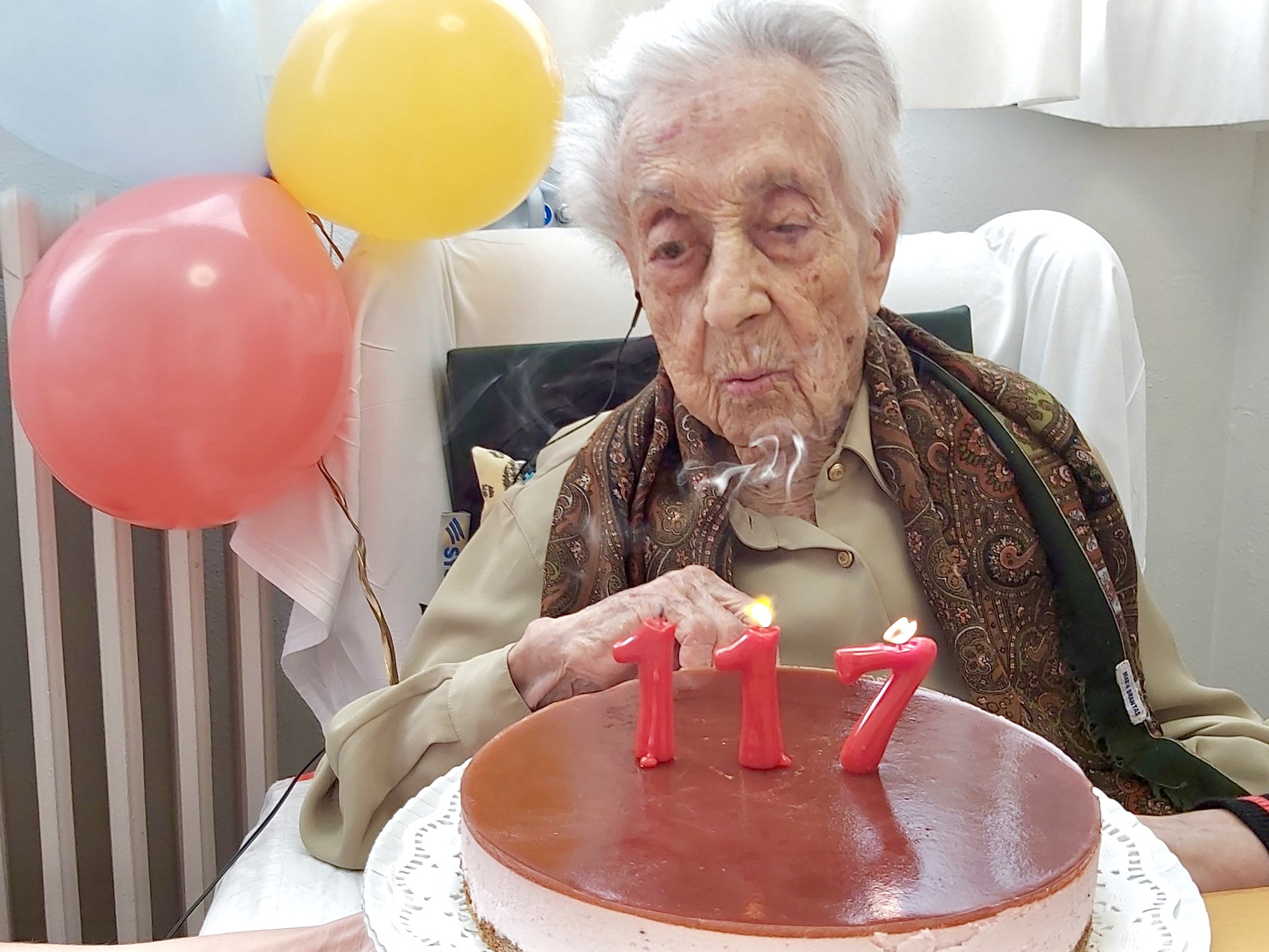
- Branyas on her 117th birthday in 2024
- Born: Maria Branyas Morera; 4 March 1907; San Francisco, California, U.S.
- Died: 19 August 2024 (aged 117 years, 168 days); Olot, Catalonia, Spain
- Citizenship: United States; Spain
- Known for: Oldest verified living person (17 January 2023 – 19 August 2024); Oldest Spaniard ever; Second-oldest American
- Spouse: Joan Moret (m. 1931; died 1976)
- Children: 3

Maria Branyas Morera (Catalan: [məˈɾiə ˈβɾaɲəs]; 4 March 1907 – 19 August 2024) was an American and Catalan supercentenarian, who, until her death at the age of 117 years and 168 days, was the world's oldest verified living person, following the death of Lucile Randon on 17 January 2023.

== Personal life ==
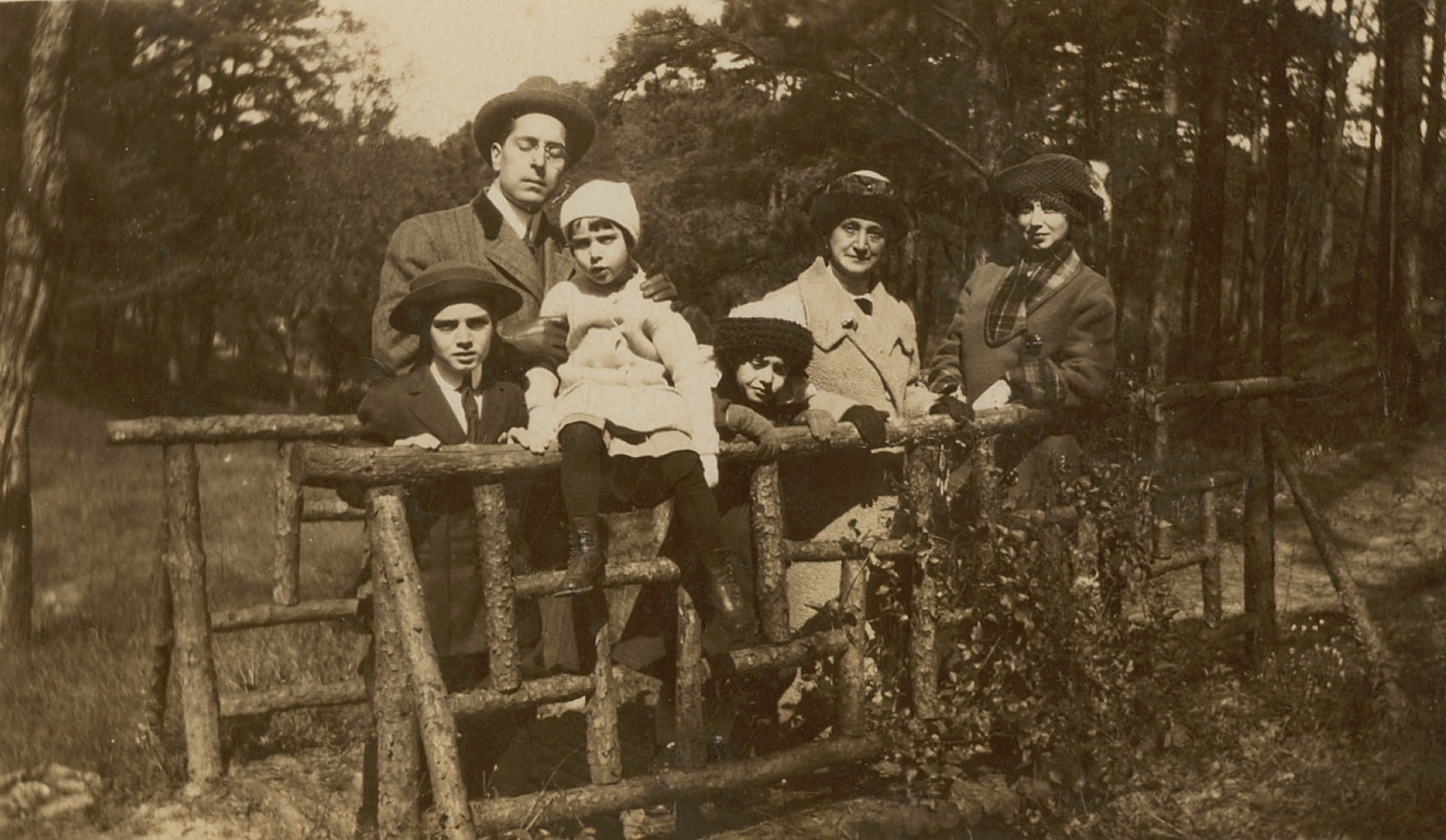
Branyas, then age four, sitting on a wooden fence with her family in 1911 in New Orleans

Branyas was born on 4 March 1907 in San Francisco, California. She was the first child and eldest daughter to Joseph Branyas Julià (1877–1915) and Teresa Morera Laque (1880–1968). In 1906, the year before her birth, her Catalan family had emigrated to the US. She and her family moved to Texas then to New Orleans, where her father Joseph was a journalist, founding the Spanish-language magazine Mercurio.

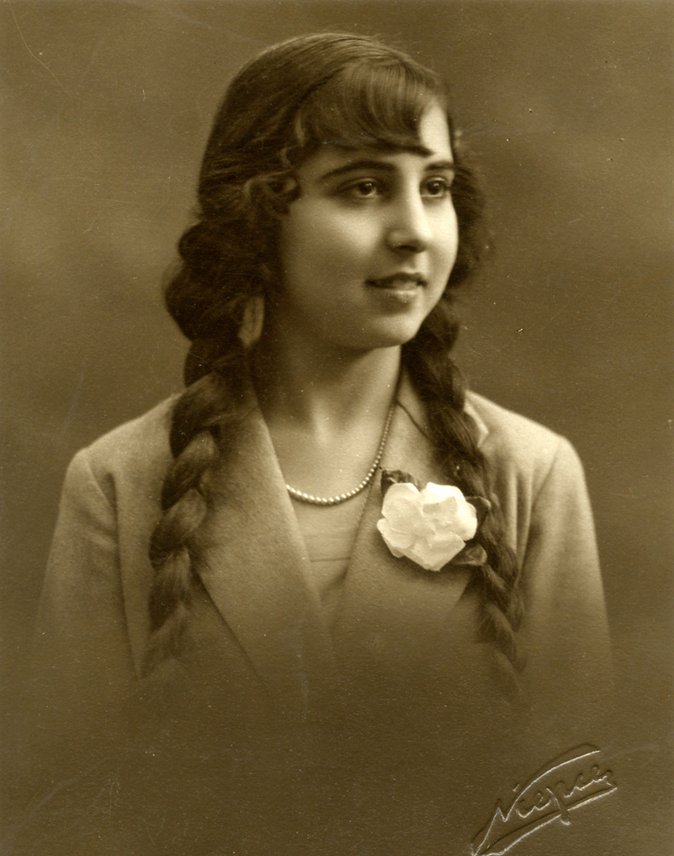
Branyas, 1925

In 1915, her family returned to Catalonia due to her father's declining health and bankruptcy. Due to the German Atlantic U-boat campaign of World War I, they traveled via Cuba and the Azores to ensure a safe passage. During the voyage, Branyas became deaf in one ear after falling from the upper deck to the lower deck while playing with her brothers. Branyas' father died of tuberculosis on the voyage. Her mother remarried. The family settled in Barcelona then moved northeast to Banyoles.

On 16 July 1931, Branyas married Joan Moret, a traumatologist, with whom she had three children. During the Spanish Civil War, Branyas served as a nurse, working by her husband's side at a Nationalist field hospital in Trujillo, Extremadura. While later living in Girona, Moret became the regional leader of the healthcare organisation Obra Sindical 18 de Julio. He was also the director of the Josep Trueta Hospital, then called Residencia Sanitaria Álvarez de Castro, in Girona from 1972 to 1974. Branyas worked as a nurse and as her husband's assistant until his death in 1976.

In the 1990s, Branyas travelled to Egypt, Italy, the Netherlands, and England, and took up sewing, music, and reading. In 2000, she moved to a nursing home in Olot at the age of 93. Branyas was described as an active resident there, continuing to perform exercises until her mobility deteriorated. Branyas played the piano until she was 108, and used a voice-to-text platform to communicate due to hearing loss. She had 11 grandchildren.

== Health and longevity ==
Branyas became a supercentenarian in 2017, which is achieved by about one in a thousand centenarians. In March 2020, Branyas became the then-oldest (Note: Branyas remained the oldest person to recover from COVID-19 until January 2021, when Lucile Randon, who was three years Branyas's senior, tested positive days before her 117th birthday.) person to recover from COVID-19. In an interview with The Observer, she called for better treatment of the elderly: "This pandemic has revealed that older people are the forgotten ones of our society. They fought their whole lives, sacrificed time and their dreams for today's quality of life. They didn't deserve to leave the world in this way". In July 2020, a research study into the impact of the coronavirus pandemic on elderly care home residents was conducted by the Spanish National Research Council and Dalt Pharmacy. The study was called Proyecto Branyas ('Project Branyas') in her honour.

Branyas officially became the oldest living person in the world on 17 January 2023, after the death of Lucile Randon of France. In 2023, she became the subject of scientific research as a result of maintaining good health and memory at an advanced age. Branyas died of natural causes in her sleep on 19 August 2024 at the age of 117 years and 168 days. After her death, Tomiko Itooka became the world's oldest living person.

On 25 February 2025, Santos-Pujol, Esteller and colleagues unveiled a comprehensive multiomics analysis of her genomic, transcriptomic, metabolomic, proteomic, microbiomic and epigenomic landscapes in different tissues, and compared the results with those observed in non-supercentenarian populations. Their study suggests "extremely advanced age and poor health are not intrinsically linked."

== See also ==
- List of American supercentenarians
- List of European supercentenarians
- Oldest people
