= Tomiko Itooka =

Japanese supercentenarian (1908–2024)

- 糸岡富子
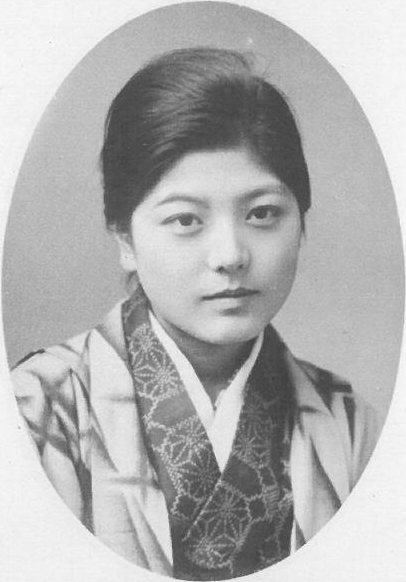
- Itooka's (then Yano) 1925 Osaka Jogakuin University yearbook photo
- Born: Tomiko Yano; 23 May 1908; Osaka, Empire of Japan
- Died: 29 December 2024 (aged 116 years, 220 days); Ashiya, Hyōgo, Japan
- Known for: Oldest known living person (19 August 2024 – 29 December 2024); Oldest known living Japanese person (12 December 2023 – 29 December 2024)
- Spouse: Kenji Itooka (m. 1928; died 1979)
- Children: 4

Tomiko Itooka (née Yano; Japanese: 糸岡 富子, romanized: Itooka Tomiko; 23 May 1908 – 29 December 2024) was a Japanese supercentenarian who was recognized as the world's oldest verified living person in September 2024. She managed her family's textile business during World War II and lived to the age of 116 years and 220 days.

== Early life ==
Tomiko Itooka (née Yano) was born on 23 May 1908, in Osaka, Empire of Japan. She was one of three children in a family that operated a clothing store. She grew up in prewar Japan, a period marked by modernization and imperial expansion. During her high school years, she participated in volleyball.

== Career ==
Itooka married Kenji Itooka, the owner of a textile company. During World War II, she took on the responsibility of managing the family business in Japan while her husband worked at a factory in Korea, then under Japanese colonial rule. According to the Gerontology Research Group, she oversaw business operations while raising her children during this period. After the war, she continued to support the family business.

== Personal life ==
Itooka had four children. In 1979, her husband died. Following his death, Itooka relocated to Ashiya, Hyōgo. In her later years, she maintained an active lifestyle. In her 70s, she climbed Mount Nijō, and summited Mount Ontake twice. At the age of 100 in 2008, Itooka successfully climbed each step of Ashiya shrine without any assistance. She participated in the Saigoku Kannon Pilgrimage, which was a pilgrimage to 33 temples. Itooka attributed her longevity to eating bananas and drinking Calpis, a Japanese dairy-based beverage. She was a Jōdo Shinshū.

Itooka was still able to independently move at age 116, but she mainly used a wheelchair. She was recognized as the oldest living person by Guinness World Records in September 2024 after the death of Maria Branyas. She died on 29 December 2024, at the age of 116 years and 220 days, at a nursing home in Ashiya. Reports attributed her death to complications related to old age. Following her death, 116-year-old Inah Canabarro Lucas of Brazil became the world's oldest living person.

== See also ==
- List of Japanese supercentenarians
- List of oldest living people
- Oldest people
