= Emma Morano =

Italian supercentenarian (1899–2017)

Emma Morano Dame Grand Cross OMRI
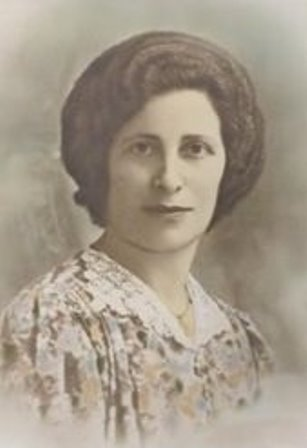
- Morano in 1943
- Born: Emma Martina Luigia Morano; 29 November 1899; Civiasco, Italy
- Died: 15 April 2017 (aged 117 years, 137 days); Verbania, Italy
- Resting place: Pallanza Cemetery, Verbania
- Known for: Oldest living person (13 May 2016 – 15 April 2017); Oldest verified Italian person ever; Last person living verified to have been born in the 1800s
- Spouse: Giovanni Martinuzzi (m. 1926; died 1978)
- Children: 1

Emma Martina Luigia Morano OMRI (29 November 1899 – 15 April 2017) was an Italian supercentenarian. She was the world's oldest living person from 13 May 2016 until her death on 15 April 2017, aged 117 years and 137 days. She was also the last living person verified to have been born in the 1800s. She remains the oldest Italian person ever to be documented and the fourth-oldest European ever.

== Early life ==
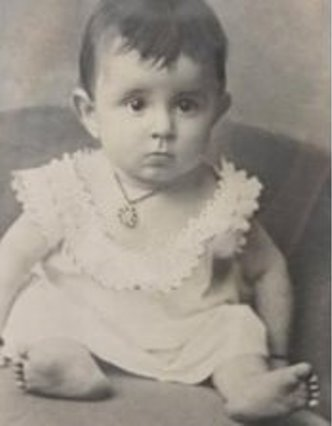
Morano as an infant in 1900

Emma Martina Luigia Morano was born on 29 November 1899 in Civiasco, Vercelli, Piedmont, to Giovanni Morano and Matilde Bresciani, the eldest of eight children (five daughters and three sons). She had a long-lived family: her mother, an aunt and some of her siblings turned 90, and one of her sisters, Angela Morano (1908–2011), died at age 102.

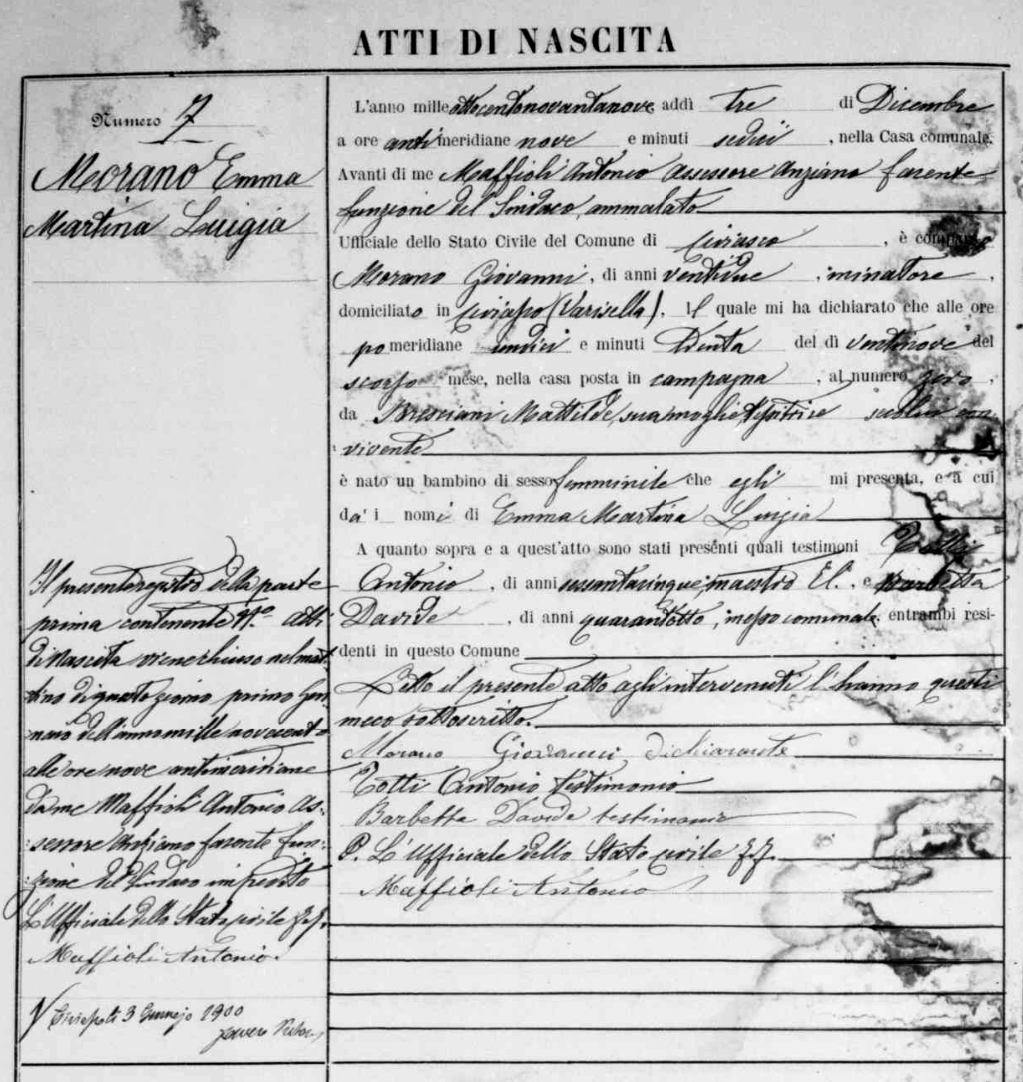
Birth record of Emma Morano

When she was a child she moved from the Sesia Valley to Ossola for her father's job, but the climate was so unhealthy there that a physician advised her family to live somewhere with more moderate weather. The family moved to Pallanza (later merged into Verbania), on Lake Maggiore, where Morano lived for the rest of her life. In October 1926, she married Giovanni Martinuzzi (1901–1978); her only child was born in 1937, but died when he was only six months old. The marriage was unhappy, and Morano and her husband separated in 1938.

== Later life and longevity ==
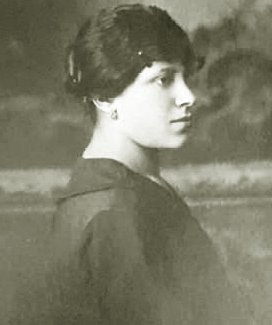
Emma Morano, 1920s

Until 1954, Morano worked at Maioni Industry, a jute factory in her town. She subsequently worked in the kitchen of Collegio Santa Maria, a Marianist boarding school in Verbania, until her retirement at the age of 75.

In December 2011, she was awarded the honour of Knight of the Order of Merit of the Italian Republic by President Giorgio Napolitano.

In 2013, when asked about the secret of her longevity, she said that she ate three eggs a day, occasionally drank a glass of homemade grappa, and enjoyed a chocolate sometimes, but, above all, she thought positively about the future. She was still living alone in her home on her 115th birthday. In 2016, she credited her long life to her diet of raw eggs and to staying single. Morano commented "I eat two eggs a day, and that's it. And cookies. But I do not eat much because I have no teeth".

Morano became the oldest living person in Italy and Europe after the death of Maria Redaelli on 2 April 2013. On her 114th birthday, she gave a short live TV interview to a RAI show. On her 116th birthday, Morano received congratulations from Pope Francis.

She surpassed the age of Venere Pizzinato in August 2014 and Dina Manfredini (who died in the United States) in August 2015, becoming the oldest Italian person ever. On 13 May 2016, (Note: Susannah Mushatt Jones died on 12 May 2016 at 8:26 pm EDT. However, in Italy, where Morano lived, the date was already 13 May 2016 (CEST).) upon the death of American woman Susannah Mushatt Jones, Morano became the world's oldest living person and also the last living person verified to have been born before 1900. On 29 July 2016, she was presented with a certificate from Guinness World Records recognising her as the oldest person alive. Festivities celebrating her 117th birthday on 29 November 2016 were broadcast live in Italy.

== Death ==
Morano died at her home in Verbania, Italy, on 15 April 2017, at the age of 117. At the time of her death, she was the fourth-oldest person in recorded history. Upon her death, Violet Brown became the world's oldest living person.

== See also ==
- List of Italian supercentenarians
- List of European supercentenarians
- List of the verified oldest people
- List of the oldest people by country
- Longevity
- Oldest people
