= Ilie Ciocan =

Romanian supercentenarian (1913–2026)

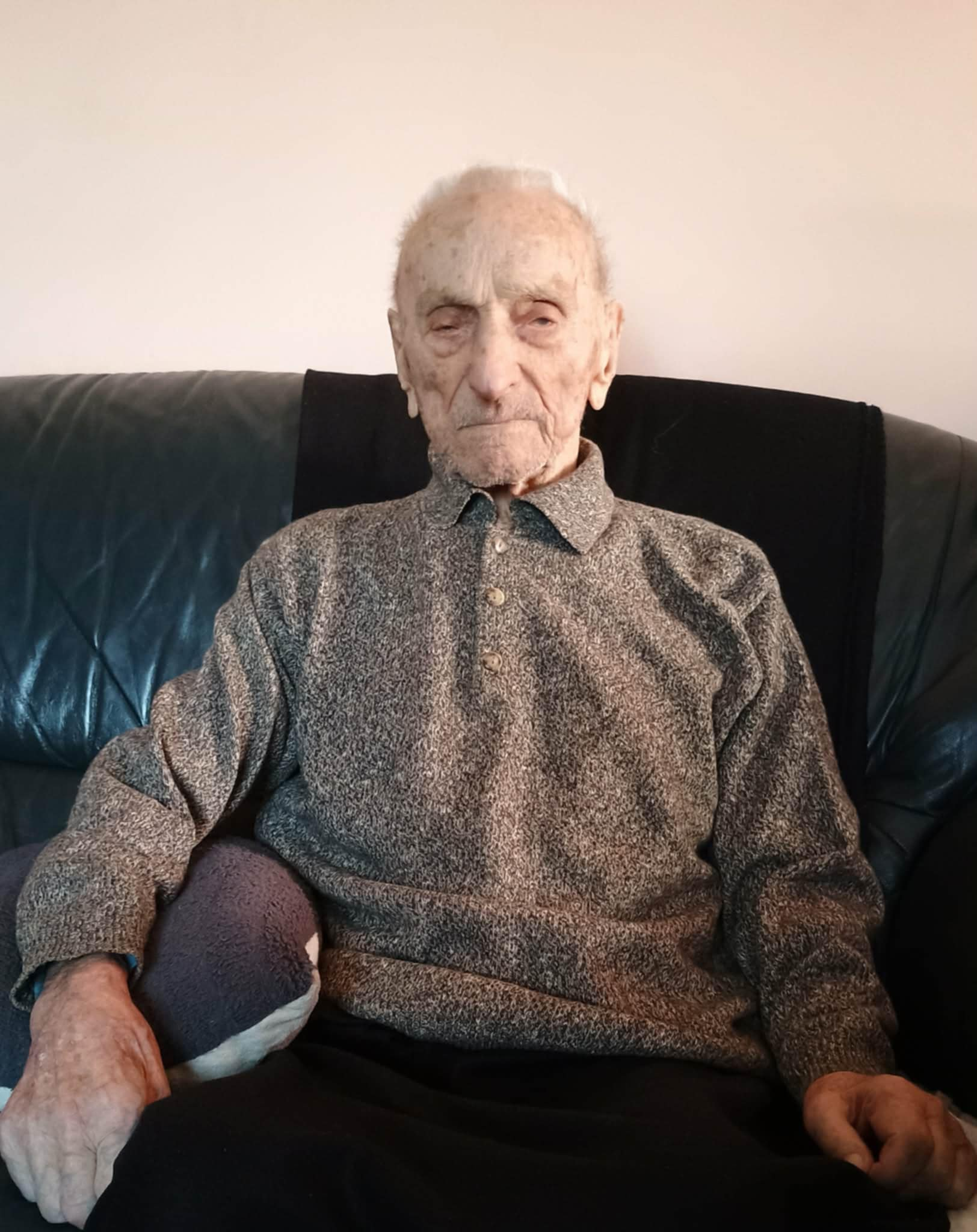
- Ciocan in 2025
- Born: 10 June 1913; Cremenari, Galicea, Vâlcea County, Kingdom of Romania
- Died: 27 May 2026 (aged 112 years, 351 days); Bratia din Vale, Galicea, Vâlcea County, Romania
- Known for: Oldest living World War II veteran (30 January 2024 – 27 May 2026); Oldest living European man (25 November 2024 – 27 May 2026); Oldest Romanian person ever
- Spouse: Floarea Obogeanu (m. 1932; died 1992)
- Children: 6
- Military career
- Allegiance: Kingdom of Romania
- Branch: Romanian Land Forces
- Service years: 1935–1945
- Rank: Major
- Conflicts: World War II

Ilie Ciocan (Romanian: [iˈli.e tʃoˈkan]; 10 June [O.S. 28 May] 1913 – 27 May 2026) was a Romanian supercentenarian who, at the time of his death at the age of 112 years, 351 days, was the oldest living World War II veteran and the second-oldest living man in the world after João Marinho Neto of Brazil. He is the oldest known Romanian person ever.

== Background ==
Ilie Ciocan was born in the village of Cremenari, Galicea, Vâlcea County, Romania, on 10 June [O.S. 28 May] 1913. He was orphaned as a child and began work as a shepherd to survive.

In January 1932, at the age of 18, he married Floarea Obogeanu, who was seven years his senior. Together they had six children, three daughters and three sons. His wife died in 1992, aged 86.

Ciocan died in Bratia din Vale in Galicea on 27 May 2026, at the age of 112 years and 351 days. After his death, the oldest living veteran of World War II and the oldest living man in Europe was Vitantonio Lovallo of Italy.

== Military service ==
In 1935, Ciocan was drafted into the Romanian Army at the age of 22 and was posted to 6th Artillery Regiment in Pitești; he was subsequently sent to the front in 1941 as Romania entered World War II. He participated in World War II on the Axis side as a machine-gunner and courier on the Eastern Front, in Odesa and the Don Bend, but also went to the Western Front.

Following orders of general promotion issued after 1990 by the Ministry of National Defence of Romania, Ciocan reached the rank of major.

== Health and longevity ==
Ciocan could ride a bicycle until 90 years old. At the age of 93, he slipped in snow and broke his leg, and recovered despite prohibiting doctors from putting his leg in a cast. He was able to read the newspaper without glasses until he reached the age of 103.

Ciocan became the oldest living man in Europe following the death of 112-year-old Briton John Tinniswood on 25 November 2024. On 16 January 2025, he surpassed the national record of 111 years and 219 days set by Dumitru Comănescu (1908–2020), becoming the oldest validated person ever from Romania.
