= Galicea =

- Commune
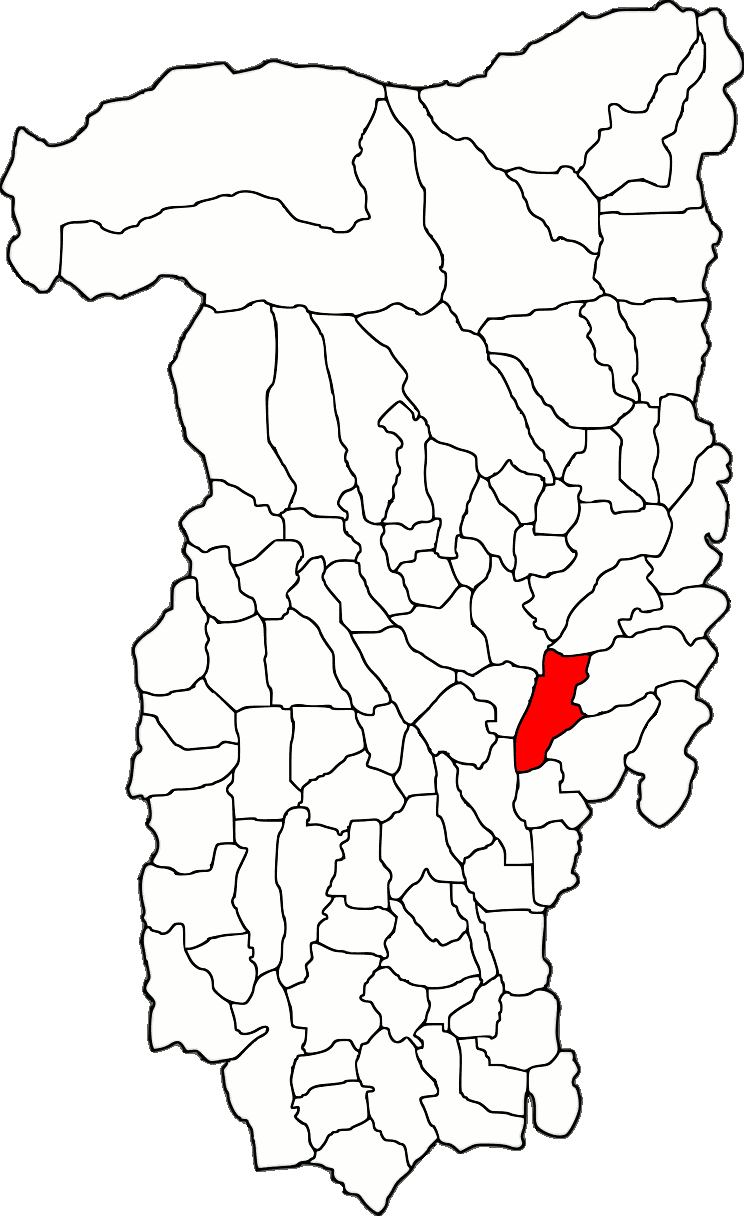
- Location in Vâlcea County

- Location in Romania
- Coordinates: 44°55′N 24°17′E
- Country: Romania
- County: Vâlcea

Government
  - Mayor (2020–2024): Florin-Alexandru Mărăcine (PSD)
- Area: 55.72 km^{2} (21.51 sq mi)
- Elevation: 225 m (738 ft)
- Population (2021-12-01): 3,268
  - Density: 58.65/km^{2} (151.9/sq mi)
- Time zone: UTC+02:00 (EET)
  - Summer (DST): UTC+03:00 (EEST)
- Postal code: 247205
- Area code: +(40) 250
- Vehicle reg.: VL
- Website: www.primariagalicea-valcea.ro

Galicea is a commune located in Vâlcea County, Muntenia, Romania. It is composed of nine villages: Bratia din Deal, Bratia din Vale, Cocoru, Cremenari, Dealu Mare, Galicea, Ostroveni, Teiu, and Valea Râului.

== Notable people ==
- Ilie Ciocan (1913–2026), the oldest known person in Romanian history.
- Bogdan Vătăjelu (born 1993), football player
