= Capistrano de Abreu =

Brazilian historian

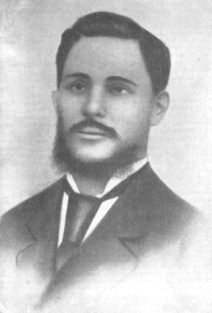
- Capistrano de Abreu
- Born: October 23, 1853; Maranguape
- Died: August 13, 1927 (aged 73); Rio de Janeiro
- Occupation: Historian

João Capistrano Honório de Abreu (October 23, 1853 – August 13, 1927) was a Brazilian historian. His works are characterized by a rigorous investigation of the sources and a critical view of the historical process. João Capistrano de Abreu was born in Maranguape, Ceará. He dedicated himself to the study of colonial Brazil. His book Capítulos de História Colonial ("Chapters of Colonial History") is a major reference for all who study Brazilian history.

He was a member of the Brazilian Historic and Geographic Institute.

== Works ==
- Estudo sobre Raimundo da Rocha Lima (1878);
- José de Alencar (1878);
- A língua dos Bacaeris (1897);
- Capítulos de História Colonial (1907);
- Dois documentos sobre Caxinauás (1911–1912);
- Os Caminhos Antigos e o Povoamento do Brasil (1930);
- O Descobrimento do Brasil (1883);
- Ensaios e Estudos (1931–1933, postmortem edition);
- Correspondência (1954, postmortem edition).
