= Battle of Ponche Verde =

Pivotal battle of the Ragamuffin War

- Part of the Ragamuffin War
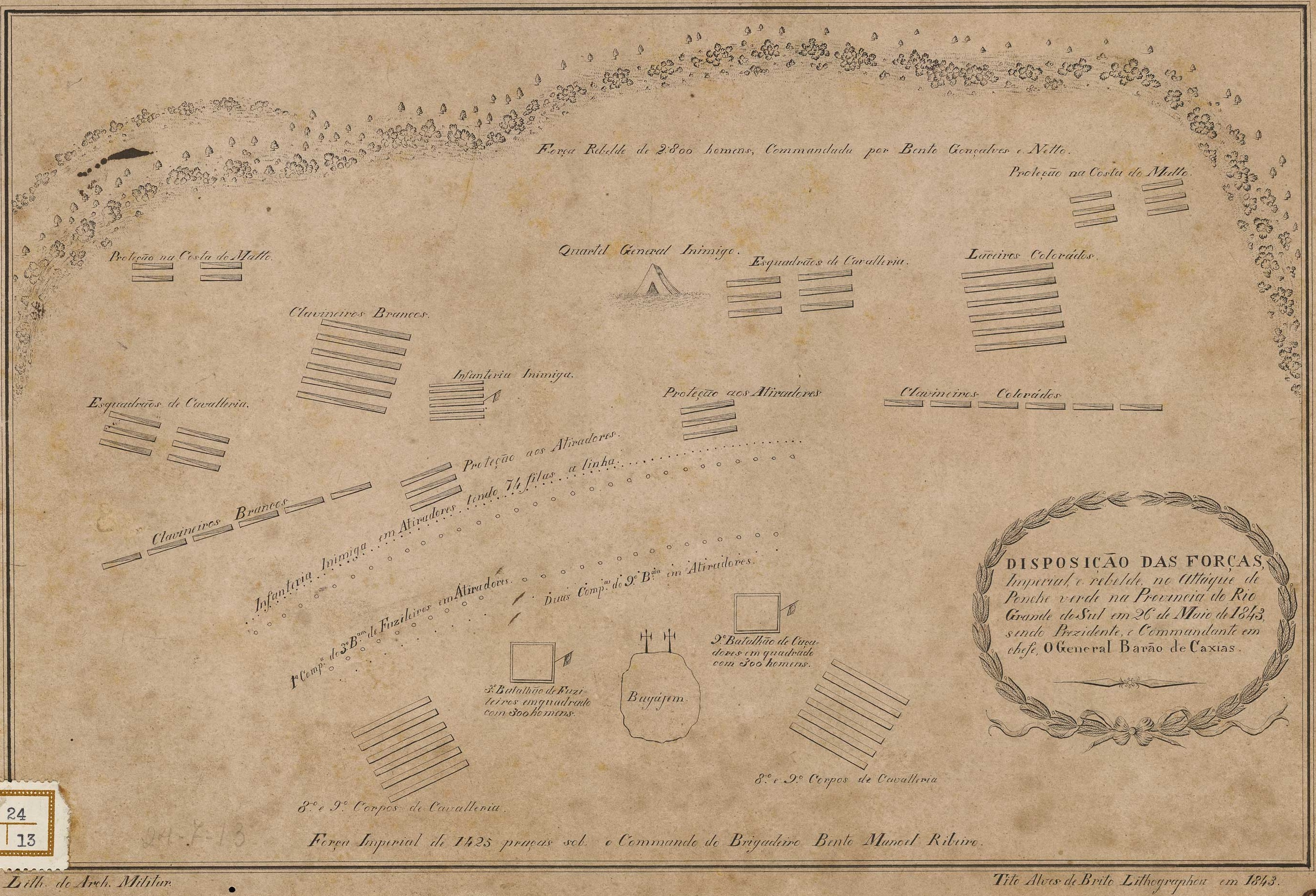
- Displacement of forces during the battle
Date	26 May 1843
Location	Dom Pedrito, Rio Grande do Sul, Empire of Brazil
Result	Indecisive

Belligerents
Riograndense Republic	Empire of Brazil

Commanders and leaders
Bento Gonçalves; Davi Canabarro; Antônio de Sousa Neto	Bento Manuel (WIA); Francisco Pedro

Strength
2,800 men	1,425 men

Casualties and losses
35 dead 100 wounded	50 dead 30 wounded

The Battle of Ponche Verde took place on 26 May 1843 between troops of the breakaway Riograndense Republic and forces loyal to the Empire of Brazil during the Ragamuffin War's late stages; it ended with an organized withdrawal by the republican forces. It is considered to have been the last major battle in the conflict.

== Background and engagement ==
By May 1843, the Ragamuffin War had been raging for nearly 8 years, and both sides of the conflict were exhausted. The Republican forces had been driven out of Rio Grande do Sul multiple times and, since Luís Alves de Lima e Silva's arrival in the beginning of the 1840s to command the Imperial forces, had their fortunes constantly dwindling. The Imperial army inched towards Alegrete, the Republican capital, from various directions; an opportunity was seen by Bento Gonçalves, the Riograndense leader, to destroy the Imperial 2nd Division, which was short in cavalry and isolated from the rest of its army.

The battle consisted of a series of indecisive cavalry charges against the Imperial infantry which had formed into squares. The Republicans managed to capture the enemy baggage train. Both sides claimed victory.
