= Battle of Rincón =

1825 battle of the Cisplatine War

- Part of the Cisplatine War
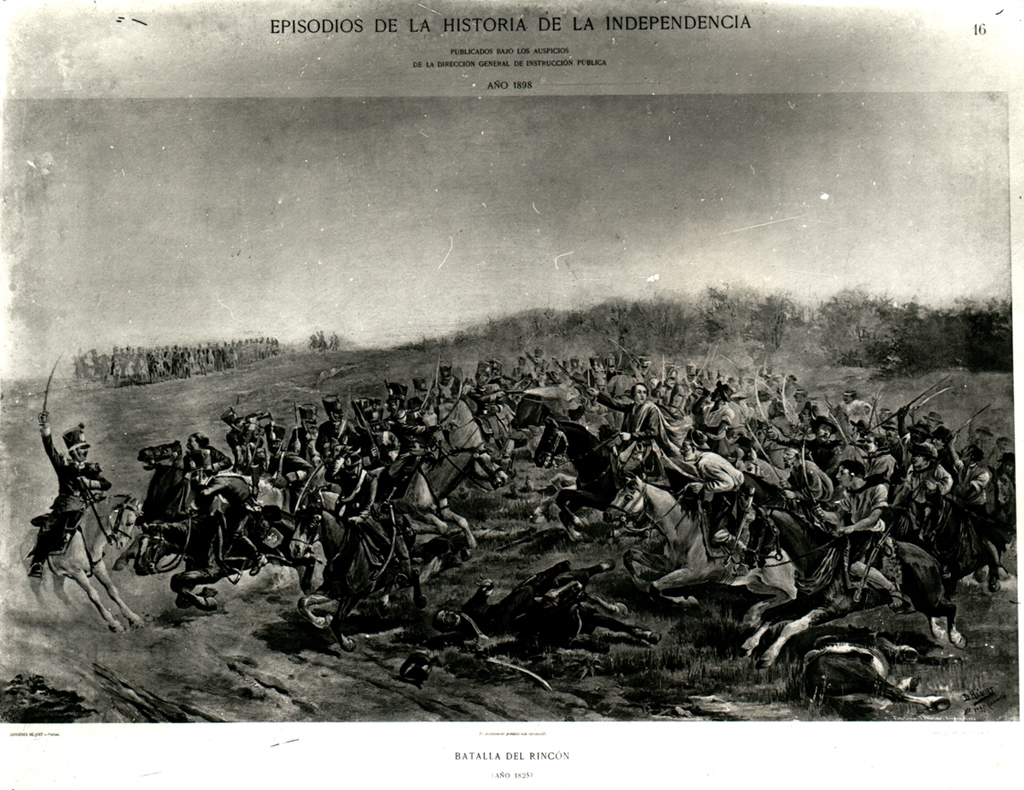
- Batalla del Rincón by Diógenes Hequet, 1895
Date	24 September 1825
Location	Rincón del Haedo, present-day Río Negro Department, Uruguay 33°12′18″S 58°3′41″W
Result	Oriental victory

Belligerents
Empire of Brazil	Banda Oriental

Commanders and leaders
Jerônimo Jardim; Mena Barreto †	Fructuoso Rivera

Strength
420 men	250 men

Casualties and losses
120 killed and captured	7 killed 16 wounded
- Location within Uruguay

The Battle of Rincón, of Rincón de las Gallinas or of Rincón de Haedo was the first engagement between Fructuoso Rivera's rebel forces and those loyal to the Empire of Brazil during the Cisplatine War, taking place in 24 September 1825 in modern Uruguay's Río Negro Department.

== Background ==
The Banda Oriental had been annexed to the United Kingdom of Portugal, Brazil and the Algarves in 31 July 1821, as the Cisplatine Province, after a long conflict with José Gervasio Artigas's forces. The territory was never effectively integrated, economically or legally, into the Empire.

Juan Antonio Lavalleja began a campaign against the Brazilian rule on April 19 1825, ahead of the Thirty-Three Orientals, disembarking on the Agraciada Beach. Soon afterwards they united with more men under General Fructuoso Rivera; this force was too large for the Brazilian troops in the interior to handle and so they retreated to Montevideo. Both Rivera and Lavalleja had served under Artigas in the previous conflict with the Portuguese.

On 25 August, the rebels, who controlled most of the Uruguayan countryside, declared independence from Brazil in the Congreso de la Florida, and their intent to unite with the United Provinces. Immediately, fighting began between them and the Brazilian forces. Some of these, under the command of General João de Deus Mena Barreto, were operating on the shore of the Uruguay River and had circa 8,000 horses under their power in the Rincón de Haedo, which was nearly surrounded by rivers, with its single land connection being called the Portones de Haedo. Rivera moved to try to seize the horses, planning to avoid fighting Mena Barreto's forces.

== Engagement ==
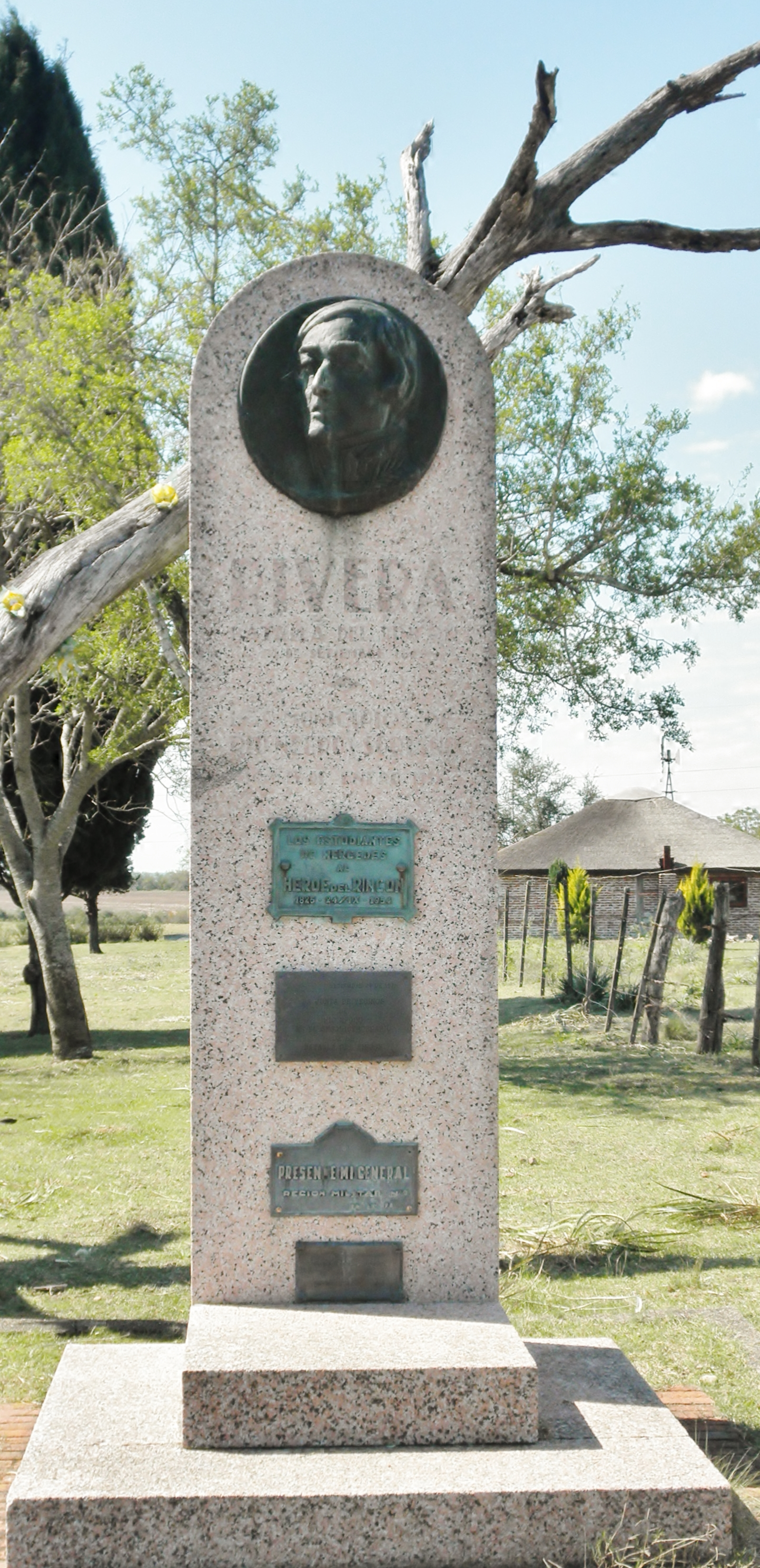
Monolith honoring Rivera's participation in the battle.

Ahead of 250 men, Rivera's men stealthily crossed the Negro River before dawn in 23 September. Amongst the force's officers were future generals Servando Gómez and Julián Laguna. They hid for the rest of that day, and, at dawn of the following, reappeared inside the Rincón and surprised the Brazilian guards on the Portones. They then gathered the horses and started herding them outwards from the Rincón.

In this moment, messages arrived telling that two Brazilian colonels were riding towards them, José Luís Mena Barreto and Jerônimo Gomes Jardim, ahead of 420 men, Guaraní militiamen from the Misiones region; the latter colonel had marched in haste from Paysandú, and both columns were operating independently. The rebels, fearing that if they did not have a decisive encounter with these men, would later have to fight them and José de Abreu's also nearby troops together, decided to attack them outright. Rivera ordered a skirmish line to be set in the center and then crossed a stream with the rest of his troops in order to attack them on the flank; the attack made contact when Jardim's tired troops were switching mounts. Some of the Brazilian infantry managed to fire off a volley, and then the Orientals reached them. Forced to withdraw, Jardim managed to save less than half of his troops in a swift retreat.

Then, Colonel Mena Barreto's men were engaged and dispersed, surprised by the swift attack; the Brazilian commander, who stood and fought, was killed.

== Aftermath ==
The Brazilian forces lost 120 men, either killed or captured. After the fight, Rivera's men left the battleground with the 8,000 horses and prisoners, which they took towards Lavalleja's headquarters in Durazno. The defeat made the Brazilians abandon the eastern shore of the Uruguay River, and also the city of Mercedes, in which José de Abreu's troops had been garrisoned.
