= Yolanda Beltrão de Azevedo =

Brazilian supercentenarian (born 1911)

- Born: January 13, 1911 (age 115 years, 306 days); Coruripe, Alagoas, Brazil
- Known for: Oldest living person in Brazil (since 24 September 2025); Oldest living person in South America (since 24 September 2025)
- Children: 4

Yolanda Beltrão de Azevedo (Portuguese pronunciation: [joˈlɐ̃dɐ bewˈtɾɐ̃w̃ dʒi azeˈvedu]; born 13 January 1911) is a Brazilian supercentenarian who, aged 115 years, 306 days, has been the oldest living person in both Brazil and South America since 24 September 2025.

== Biography ==
Yolanda Beltrão de Azevedo was born on 13 January 1911 in Coruripe, Alagoas, Brazil, the eldest of fifteen children. On 18 July 1928, she married Francisco de Araújo Azevedo, who was mayor of Coruripe from 1947-1950. Francisco and Yolanda had four children and in her adult life she was a housewife and mother.

Aged 107, Yolanda had 13 grandchildren, 30 great-grandchildren, 19 great-great-grandchildren, and one great-great-great-grandchild.

On 28 January 2021, she was vaccinated against COVID-19, being one of the oldest people in Brazil to be vaccinated against the disease.

She became Brazil's oldest living person on 24 September 2025, following the death of Izabel Rosa Pereira.

On 9 January 2026, Yolanda received a congratulatory message from João Marinho Neto, Brazil's oldest living man, who is additionally the oldest living man in the world, four days before her 115th birthday.

== See also ==
- List of Brazilian supercentenarians
- List of the verified oldest people
- List of oldest living people
