= Ken Weeks =

Oldest living person in Australia (born 1913)

Kenneth Weeks
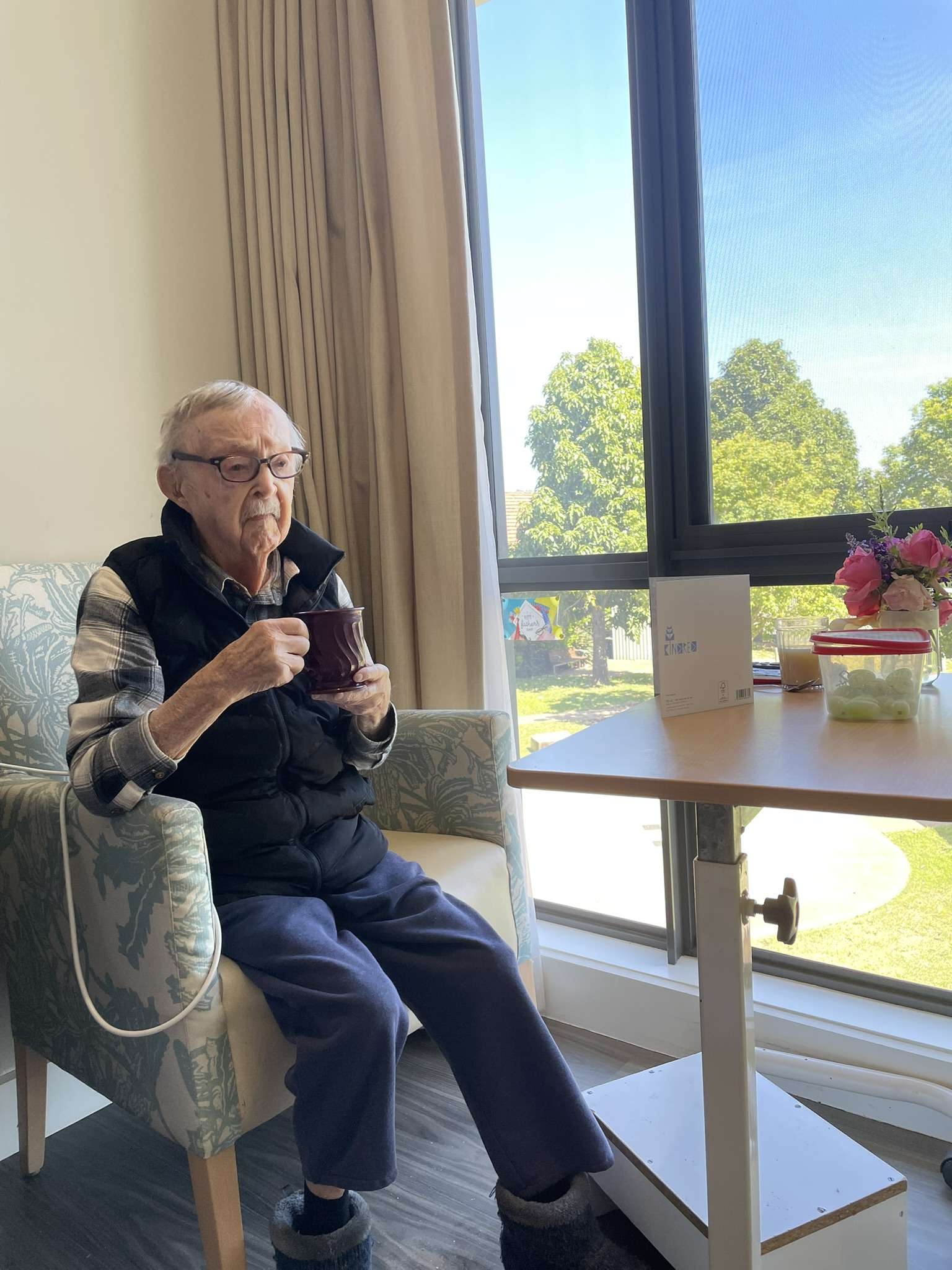
- Weeks in 2025
- Born: Kenneth Loxton Weeks; 5 October 1913 (age 113 years, 30 days); Grafton, New South Wales, Australia
- Known for: Oldest living person in Australia (since 5 June 2024); Oldest verified Australian man ever (since 12 April 2025); Second-oldest verified living man (since 27 May 2026); Last surviving verified man born in 1913
- Spouse: Jean McPhee (m. 1941; died 1986)
- Children: 2

Kenneth Loxton Weeks (born 5 October 1913) is an Australian supercentenarian who, at the age of 113 years, 30 days, is the oldest living person in Australia, the oldest verified man in Australian and Oceanian history, and the 3rd-oldest Australian ever. He is currently the second-oldest validated living man in the world, behind João Marinho Neto of Brazil, who is precisely one year older.

== Biography ==
Weeks was born on 5 October 1913 at his grandparents' house, located on Dovedale Street in Grafton, New South Wales, near the banks of the Clarence River. He was the first of five children born to Darcy Edwin Weeks (1887–1965) and Dorothy Forster (née Loxton; 1886–1970). As a child, his family moved to a riverside farm located in Swan Creek and he later attended Grafton High School. After leaving school he worked for the Model Homes Company that did road constructing work. He followed that up with operating a service station in Brisbane, and in partnership with Charles Alvey in Grafton operated a car dealership. In 1941 during World War II, Weeks married Jean McPhee (1911–1986) and they had two sons.

During World War II, Weeks applied to join the Royal Australian Air Force, but was rejected for medical reasons. He subsequently worked in airfield construction during the war. After the war he set up a radio, electrical sales, and repair business which he operated for several years before later replacing it with a milk bar. Weeks's occupations also included being a truck driver, petrol station operator, and employee at the Grafton Match Factory.

Weeks's wife died in 1986 after 45 years of marriage. He then lived independently until the age of 104. Shortly before turning 105, he moved to a nursing home in Grafton.

He currently lives in Clarence Valley, New South Wales.

== Longevity ==
Following the death of 110-year-old Frank Mawer on 17 September 2022, Weeks became the oldest-known living man in Australia at almost 109.

Weeks is a fan of Heinz Baked Beans. On his 110th birthday, Heinz commemorated special cans of beans for him.

Following the death of 111-year-old Olga Abate on 5 June 2024, he became the oldest-known living person in Australia.

In October 2025, he celebrated his 112th birthday, making him the first Australian man to reach this age.

On 27 May 2026, following the death of 112-year-old Ilie Ciocan of Romania, he became the second-oldest living man in the world, as well as the last surviving verified man born in 1913.

On 5 October 2026, he celebrated his 113th birthday, making him the first Australian man to reach this age. He received a congratulatory message from João Marinho Neto of Brazil (born 5 October 1912), the world's oldest living man, who shares the same birthday as Weeks. In response, Weeks sent a congratulatory message for Marinho Neto in celebration of his 114th birthday, marking the first documented communication between the oldest and second-oldest living men.

== See also ==
- Ageing of Australia
- List of Australian states by life expectancy
- List of the oldest people by country
- List of oldest people
