= João Marinho Neto =

World's oldest verified living man

- Born: 5 October 1912 (age 114 years, 47 days); Maranguape, Ceará, Brazil
- Occupation: Farmer
- Known for: World's oldest living man (since 25 November 2024); Oldest verified Brazilian man ever
- Spouses: Josefa Albano dos Santos (m. 1944; died 1994): Antonia Rodrigues Moura
- Children: 7

João Marinho Neto (Portuguese pronunciation: [ʒuˈɐ̃w̃ maˈɾij̃u ˈnɛtu]; born 5 October 1912) is a Brazilian supercentenarian who, at the age of 114 years, 47 days, has been the world's oldest verified living man since the death of John Tinniswood on 25 November 2024. He is also the oldest verified Brazilian man in history, the last known man born in 1912, the 9th oldest living person in the world, and the 10th oldest validated man ever.

== Biography ==
João Marinho Neto was born in Maranguape, Ceará, on 5 October 1912 to the farming family of his parents Antônio Júlio da Graça and Victoria da Virgem Mártyr. While still in infancy, his family moved to Apuiarés in Ceara. By age 4, he began working in the fields caring for cattle and harvesting fruits from trees of Juazeiro. In 1944, Marinho Neto married Josefa Albano dos Santos (1920–1994), with whom he had four children: Antônio, José, Fátima, and Vanda.

His wife inherited land in Fazenda Massapê, where he farmed corn and beans. He also raised livestock; chickens, cattle, goats and pigs. Later, he had three more sons; Vinícius, Jarbas, and Conceição, with Antônia Rodrigues Moura. In spite of difficulties from severe droughts in the region, he was able to create a stable livelihood. As of November 2024, Marinho Neto had six living children, 22 grandchildren, 15 great-grandchildren, and three great-great-grandchildren. Marinho Neto lives in a nursing home due to vision problems.

In August 2025, Marinho Neto sent a congratulatory message to Ethel Caterham, the world's oldest living person, marking the first ever documented communication between the oldest man and oldest woman at any given time. His birthday message to her the next year was also joined by British supercentenarian Hilda Luck (born 19 February 1914), and British centenarian Owen Filer (born 19 October 1919), recognized as the current oldest known living man in Wales. In 2026, Marinho Neto sent a congratulatory message to Yolanda Beltrão de Azevedo (born 13 January 1911), the oldest living person in Brazil, for her 115th birthday. Marinho Neto also exchanged congratulatory birthday messages with Ken Weeks that year, marking the first documented communication between the oldest and second-oldest living men.

Marinho Neto attributes his longevity to having loved ones around him and ensuring he spent his life surrounded by good people. In 2024, a nurse at the nursing home where Marinho Neto lives stated that he has no comorbidities like hypertension and diabetes, and also has no history of stroke or cancer.

== Longevity ==
On 25 November 2024, following the death of 112-year-old John Tinniswood of the United Kingdom, Marinho Neto became the world's oldest living man, as well as the last surviving verified man born in 1912.

On 13 May 2025, at the age of 112 years, 220 days, Marinho Neto surpassed the final age of Italian-Brazilian supercentenarian Delio Venturotti (1909–2022) of Santa Catarina, becoming the oldest validated Brazilian man ever.

On 6 March 2026, following the death of 111-year-old Francisco Ernesto Filho of Rio de Janeiro, Marinho Neto became the last known surviving man in Brazil born before 1915 (and the last surviving Brazilian-born man born before 1916), and also the last surviving Brazilian man born during the administration of President Hermes da Fonseca.

On 15 September 2026, following the death of 114-year-old Angélica Tiscornia of Argentina, Marinho Neto became the 10th oldest validated living person in the world, becoming the first man to do so since Juan Vicente Pérez in 2023.

On 5 October 2026, Marinho Neto celebrated his 114th birthday making him the first Brazilian man and the 10th validated man to reach this age, as well as the first man to do so since Juan Vicente Pérez in 2023.

On 1 November 2026, following the death of 114-year-old Rosa Micaela Puertas of Argentina, Marinho Neto became the last known surviving South American born in 1912 and the 9th oldest validated living person.

== See also ==
- List of Brazilian supercentenarians
- List of the verified oldest people
