= List of Italian supercentenarians =

People from Italy who have attained or surpassed the age of 110 years

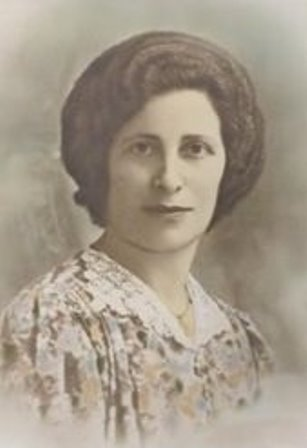
Emma Morano (1899–2017) is the oldest Italian ever recorded and was the oldest person in the world for about a year. Pictured in 1943, aged 43.

Italian supercentenarians are citizens, residents or emigrants from Italy who have attained or surpassed 110 years of age. As of January 2015, the Gerontology Research Group (GRG) had validated the longevity claims of 151 Italian supercentenarians, the majority of whom were women. The oldest Italian ever is Emma Morano, who was also the last living person born in the 1800s. The oldest living person in Italy is Lucia Laura Sangenito born on 22 November 1910 in Campania, aged 115 years, 364 days.

== 100 oldest known Italians ==
Deceased Living

Rank	Name	Sex	Birth date	Death date	Age	Birthplace	Place of death or residence
1	Emma Morano	F	29 November 1899	15 April 2017	117 years, 137 days	Piedmont	Piedmont
2	Maria Giuseppa Robucci	F	20 March 1903	18 June 2019	116 years, 90 days	Apulia	Apulia
3	Giuseppina Projetto	F	30 May 1902	6 July 2018	116 years, 37 days	Sardinia	Tuscany
4	Lucia Laura Sangenito	F	22 November 1910	Living	115 years, 364 days	Campania	Campania
5	Dina Manfredini	F	4 April 1897	17 December 2012	115 years, 257 days	Emilia-Romagna	United States
6	Marie-Josephine Gaudette	F	25 March 1902	13 July 2017	115 years, 110 days	United States	Lazio
7	Venere Pizzinato-Papo	F	23 November 1896	2 August 2011	114 years, 252 days	Austria-Hungary (Note: Pizzinato was born in Ala, which was then part of Austria-Hungary. It is now in Trentino-Alto Adige, Italy.)	Veneto
8	Claudia Baccarini	F	13 October 1910	24 December 2024	114 years, 72 days	Emilia-Romagna	Emilia-Romagna
9	Virginia Dighero-Zolezzi	F	24 December 1891	28 December 2005	114 years, 4 days	Liguria	Liguria
10	Anna Natella	F	21 November 1912	Living	114 years, 0 days	Basilicata	United States
11	Maria Redaelli-Granoli	F	3 April 1899	2 April 2013	113 years, 364 days	Lombardy	Lombardy
12	Maria Carmela Ricci	F	16 April 1912	17 February 2026	113 years, 307 days	Campania	Piedmont
13	Anna Benericetti	F	22 March 1906	11 December 2019	113 years, 264 days	Emilia-Romagna	Emilia-Romagna
14	Amalia Barone	F	6 October 1884	26 June 1998	113 years, 263 days	Campania	United States
15	Diega Cammalleri	F	23 October 1905	15 June 2019	113 years, 235 days	Sicily	Sicily
16	Francesca Fioriglio	F	11 January 1912	16 July 2025	113 years, 186 days	Sicily	Sicily
17	Amarillide Bufalini	F	27 November 1876	15 May 1990	113 years, 169 days	Lazio	United States
18	Maria Gravigi	F	3 March 1900	15 August 2013	113 years, 165 days	Friuli-Venezia Giulia	Friuli-Venezia Giulia
19	Maria Teresa Fumarola	F	2 December 1889	14 May 2003	113 years, 163 days	Apulia	Apulia
20	Domenica Ercolani	F	3 July 1910	17 November 2023	113 years, 137 days	Marche	Marche
21	Lucia Lauria	F	4 March 1896	28 June 2009	113 years, 116 days	Basilicata	Basilicata
22	Irene Ciuffoletti	F	19 January 1903	7 May 2016	113 years, 109 days	Basilicata	United States
23	Mariannina Genovese	F	15 October 1905	1 January 2019	113 years, 78 days	Sicily	Sicily
24	Stella Nardari	F	23 December 1898	23 February 2012	113 years, 62 days	Veneto	Veneto
25	Ida Frabboni	F	4 October 1896	2 November 2009	113 years, 29 days	Emilia-Romagna	Emilia-Romagna
25	Guerina Amedei	F	31 January 1906	1 March 2019	113 years, 29 days	Emilia-Romagna	Emilia-Romagna
27	Giulia Sani	F	15 September 1893	4 September 2006	112 years, 354 days	Tuscany	Tuscany
28	Renata Bianchi	F	16 October 1906	4 October 2019	112 years, 353 days	Emilia-Romagna	Emilia-Romagna
29	Antonio Todde	M	22 January 1889	3 January 2002	112 years, 346 days	Sardinia	Sardinia
30	Cristina Paloscia	F	15 May 1912	31 March 2025	112 years, 320 days	Abruzzo	Tuscany
31	Marietta Capizzi	F	30 January 1901	10 November 2013	112 years, 284 days	Sicily	United States
32	Maria Muraro	F	29 March 1892	2 January 2005	112 years, 279 days	Veneto	Veneto
33	Rosa Bandini	F	11 September 1901	12 June 2014	112 years, 274 days	Emilia-Romagna	Emilia-Romagna
34	Rosa De Vita	F	8 February 1911	11 October 2023	112 years, 245 days	Campania	Campania
35	Emilia Zucchetti	F	28 August 1903	26 April 2016	112 years, 242 days	Veneto	Lombardy
36	Valesca Tanganelli	F	7 July 1907	4 March 2020	112 years, 241 days	Tuscany	Tuscany
37	Ida Zoccarato	F	24 May 1909	16 January 2022	112 years, 237 days	Veneto	Veneto
38	Delio Venturotti	M	25 October 1909	1 June 2022	112 years, 219 days	Veneto	Brazil
39	Anna Maria Rosati	F	4 May 1905	27 November 2017	112 years, 207 days	Lombardy	Lombardy
40	Louisa Chiacchiari	F	10 December 1886	29 June 1999	112 years, 201 days	Molise	United States
41	Lina Grotta	F	22 November 1896	27 May 2009	112 years, 186 days	Tuscany	Tuscany
42	Carmela Velardi	F	22 October 1906	21 April 2019	112 years, 181 days	Sicily	Sicily
43	Catherine Abate	F	15 November 1909	7 May 2022	112 years, 173 days	Basilicata	United States
44	Giovanni Frau	M	29 December 1890	19 June 2003	112 years, 172 days	Sardinia	Sardinia
45	Vitantonio Lovallo	M	28 March 1914	15 September 2026	112 years, 171 days	Basilicata	Basilicata
46	Serafina Naccarato	F	10 October 1893	29 March 2006	112 years, 170 days	Calabria	Marche
47	Lorenza Dotta	F	7 August 1894	11 January 2007	112 years, 157 days	Piedmont	Piedmont
48	Vincenza Colucci	F	24 January 1903	26 June 2015	112 years, 153 days	Abruzzo	United States
49	Maria Oliva	F	16 April 1909	27 August 2021	112 years, 133 days	Sicily	Sicily
50	Ines Sommovigo	F	6 November 1911	16 March 2024	112 years, 131 days	Liguria	Liguria
51	Rosa Pesce	F	12 September 1902	9 January 2015	112 years, 119 days	Piedmont	Piedmont
52	Amelia Addari	F	25 March 1912	20 July 2024	112 years, 117 days	Sardinia	Sardinia
53	Santa Gennari	F	23 February 1899	18 June 2011	112 years, 115 days	Marche	Marche
54	Giuseppa Salerno	F	17 June 1911	26 September 2023	112 years, 101 days	Campania	Campania
55	Rosaria "Rose" Caleca	F	5 February 1895	6 May 2007	112 years, 90 days	Sicily	United States
56	Erminia Bianchini	F	23 April 1908	23 June 2020	112 years, 61 days	Piedmont	Piedmont
57	Chelidonia Merosi	F	11 October 1883	10 December 1995	112 years, 60 days	Lazio	Lazio
58	Maria Antonia D’Amore	F	20 October 1909	24 November 2021	112 years, 35 days	Abruzzo	Lazio
59	Onorina Apprato de Tagliaferro	F	7 July 1913	10 August 2025	112 years, 34 days	Piedmont	Argentina
60	Maria Mallozzi	F	25 September 1887	26 October 1999	112 years, 31 days	Lazio	Canada
61	Angela Case	F	21 July 1899	17 August 2011	112 years, 27 days	Veneto	Veneto
62	Mamie Tei	F	14 November 1913	7 December 2025	112 years, 23 days	United States	Tuscany
63	Elia Concari	F	14 July 1905	2 August 2017	112 years, 19 days	Abruzzo	Lombardy
64	Angela Tiraboschi	F	19 April 1910	7 May 2022	112 years, 18 days	Lombardy	Lombardy
65	Antonia Manzi	F	20 February 1912	4 March 2024	112 years, 13 days	Lazio	Lazio
66	Irma Ilari	F	22 September 1907	17 September 2019	111 years, 360 days	Tuscany	Tuscany
67	Arturo Licata	M	2 May 1902	24 April 2014	111 years, 357 days	Sicily	Sicily
68	Maria Novara	F	4 May 1913	24 April 2025	111 years, 355 days	Sicily	Sicily
69	Maria Crescini	F	20 January 1904	17 December 2015	111 years, 331 days	Lombardy	Lombardy
70	Margherita Carossio	F	10 August 1905	30 June 2017	111 years, 324 days	Piedmont	Argentina
70	Isabella Pelà	F	26 July 1914	15 June 2026	111 years, 324 days	Veneto	Trentino-Alto Adige
72	Frances Pisano	F	2 April 1910	18 February 2022	111 years, 322 days	Calabria	United States
73	Margherita Venzo	F	21 February 1903	8 January 2015	111 years, 321 days	Veneto	Veneto
74	Maria Zaccaria	F	24 November 1905	2 October 2017	111 years, 312 days	Sicily	France
75	Valerio Piroddi	M	13 November 1905	18 September 2017	111 years, 309 days	Sardinia	Sardinia
76	Maria Negri	F	12 March 1895	13 January 2007	111 years, 307 days	Veneto	Veneto
77	Lucia Clemente Ronda	F	22 April 1914	14 February 2026	111 years, 298 days	Lombardy	Lombardy
78	Lidia Menis Peresini	F	30 November 1906	22 September 2018	111 years, 296 days	Friuli-Venezia Giulia	Costa Rica
79	Matilde Coulter	F	30 March 1909	19 January 2021	111 years, 295 days	Apulia	United Kingdom
80	Maria Luisa Tortech	F	9 May 1914	18 February 2026	111 years, 285 days	France	Liguria
81	Luigia Mercalli	F	17 February 1915	Living	111 years, 277 days	Sardinia	Sardinia
82	Maria-Elisa Moro	F	11 February 1897	2 November 2008	111 years, 265 days	Veneto	Lazio
83	Rita Lotta	F	17 November 1912	1 August 2024	111 years, 258 days	Apulia	Apulia
83	Iole Barosi	F	3 April 1914	17 December 2025	111 years, 258 days	Lombardy	Lombardy
85	Giuseppa Campagna	F	1 January 1903	15 September 2014	111 years, 257 days	Sicily	United States
86	Lilla De Geronimi	F	2 December 1892	14 August 2004	111 years, 256 days	Liguria	Liguria
87	Ida Ortolani	F	4 October 1912	14 June 2024	111 years, 254 days	United States	Lombardy
88	Maria Ciuffreda	F	21 June 1899	28 February 2011	111 years, 252 days	Apulia	Apulia
89	Maria Granello	F	11 December 1904	11 August 2016	111 years, 244 days	Veneto	Veneto
90	Lucia Soliman	F	17 April 1911	15 December 2022	111 years, 242 days	Veneto	Veneto
91	Anita Tiburni	F	3 May 1900	27 December 2011	111 years, 238 days	Tuscany	Tuscany
92	Carolina Peretti	F	21 October 1897	15 June 2009	111 years, 237 days	Aosta Valley	Piedmont
93	Ada Ballestrino	F	6 April 1915	Living	111 years, 229 days	Liguria	Liguria
94	Maria Antonia Zuccalà	F	15 March 1905	15 October 2016	111 years, 214 days	Calabria	Calabria
95	Gesuina Donati	F	9 June 1893	1 January 2005	111 years, 206 days	Lazio	Lazio
95	Ebe Luisa Tosi	F	14 July 1913	5 February 2025	111 years, 206 days	Emilia-Romagna	Liguria
97	Anna DiFelice	F	10 March 1892	30 September 2003	111 years, 204 days	Abruzzo	United States
98	Luigia Gorla	F	28 January 1911	16 August 2022	111 years, 200 days	Lombardy	Lombardy
99	Giuseppa Comandè	F	23 December 1910	8 July 2022	111 years, 197 days	Sicily	Sicily
100	Rosa Frau	F	12 August 1901	14 February 2013	111 years, 186 days	Sardinia	Sardinia

== Biographies ==
=== Antonio Todde ===
Antonio Todde (22 January 1889 – 3 January 2002) was an Italian supercentenarian who, at the time of his death shortly before his 113th birthday, was the oldest man in the world. Todde was born in the village of Tiana, in the province of Nuoro, Sardinia, an area noted for its centenarian density. Born to a poor shepherd family, Todde was the third of 12 children. In 1920, at age 31, he married Maria Antonia, then aged 25, and they had four daughters and a son. She died in 1990, aged 95. He left Sardinia only to fight in the First World War, where he was injured in the shoulder by a grenade. He died at age 112 years and 346 days on 3 January 2002.

=== Venere Pizzinato ===
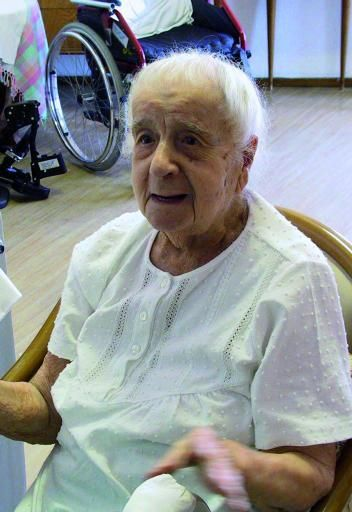
Venere Pizzinato on her 113th birthday in 2009

Venere Ires Pizzinato (married Papo; 23 November 1896 – 2 August 2011) was an Italian supercentenarian who lived for 114 years and 252 days. At the time of her death, she was the oldest person ever from Italy.

She was born in Ala, Trentino, then part of the Austro-Hungarian Empire. World War I forced her to take refuge in Bazzano, Bologna. After the war, she moved to Milan, where she took Italian citizenship and met her future husband Isidoro Papo. During the outbreak of the Second World War in 1939, the couple moved to Nice, France, to escape the Fascist regime of Benito Mussolini. They married in France, and after the war they moved back to Milan. Upon retirement in 1964, they settled in Verona. Mr. Papo died in 1981. Pizzinato remained in Verona for the rest of her life, spending her final years in a retirement home.

On 23 November 2010, marking her 114th birthday, Pizzinato was visited by Italy's president, Giorgio Napolitano, who wrote her a congratulatory letter.

=== Marie-Josephine Gaudette ===
Marie-Josephine Clarice Gaudette (25 March 1902 – 13 July 2017) was the oldest living Italian from the death of Emma Morano on 15 April 2017 until her own death three months later. Born in Manchester, New Hampshire, to French Canadian immigrants, she was also the oldest living person born in the United States from May 2016 to July 2017.

A nun known as Mother Cecilia, she lived in Canada and France before settling in Rome. She lived at the Convento di Gesù e Maria from 1958 until her death, and was considered "the world's oldest nun". Gaudette died on 13 July 2017, aged 115 years and 110 days.

=== Giuseppina Projetto-Frau ===
Giuseppina Projetto-Frau (married Frau; 30 May 1902 – 6 July 2018) was, at age 116 years and 37 days, the oldest living person in Italy from the death of Marie Josephine Gaudette on 13 July 2017, and the world's second-oldest verified living person upon the death of Nabi Tajima on 21 April 2018, until her own death on 6 July 2018.

She was born in La Maddalena, but was of Sicilian origin. Her maternal grandfather had moved from Sicily with the expedition of Giuseppe Garibaldi. In 1946, she married Giuseppe Frau, a widower with three children. At the time of her death, Projetto lived in Tuscany with her daughter-in-law and grandchildren.

=== Delio Venturotti ===
Delio Venturotti (25 October 1909 – 1 June 2022) was the oldest living Italian-born person and the second oldest man in the world at the time of his death.

He was born in Calto, Veneto, Italy. He left Italy at the age of three with his parents and two sisters, after his father had been informed of the potential for a large war in Europe. The family arrived in Rio de Janeiro and took another ship to Espírito Santo, where Venturotti worked on plantations. He would later go on to work as a driver and, starting in the 1940s, in a fabric store. He married Dulcina Gama (born 1921) on 15 March 1946 and had four children. The couple later moved to São Paulo, and 29 years later to Florianópolis. He became the oldest Italian-born person upon the death of Ida Zoccarato on 16 January 2022. When he died in June 2022, aged 112 years and 219 days, he was the second oldest man in the world after Juan Vicente Pérez; his death left Pérez as the last verified man born in the 1900s decade.

=== Lucia Laura Sangenito ===
Lucia Laura Sangenito-Abbondandolo (born 22 November 1910) is the oldest living person in Italy and the third oldest living person in the world.

Lucia Laura Sangenito-Abbondandolo was born in Sturno, Campania, Italy. She has lived there her entire life. As a young woman, she worked in the fields. She married in February 1939 and had four children; two of whom died as infants, with the other two, daughter Maria and son Michele, still living. She lost her home in the 1962 Irpinia earthquake and a new house was rebuilt in a different location in 1970. Her husband, Pasquale Abbondandolo, died at the age of 98 in 2010, and her mother, Filomena Ceriello (1879–1980) died at the age of 101. When she was 107, she had surgery for a fractured femur. She quietly celebrated her 110th birthday in November 2020 due to the COVID-19 pandemic. On 1 June 2024, she was visited by LongeviQuest, one of the top age validation organizations, which gave her a certificate recognizing her for being (at that time) the second oldest living person in Italy. She is the oldest person ever from the Campania region of Italy, and, when Claudia Baccarini died on 24 December 2024, she became the oldest living person in Italy.
