= List of oldest living people =

This is a list of the oldest living people who have been verified to be alive as of the dates of the cited supporting sources. It was estimated in 2015 that between 150 and 600 living people had reached the age of 110. The true number is not certain, as not all supercentenarians are known to researchers at a given time, and some claims cannot be validated or are fraudulent. Nearly all the top 50 oldest living people are women, as women live longer than men on average. A list of the oldest living men is provided below the main list.

- Ethel Caterham (born 21 August 1909) of the United Kingdom is the world's oldest living person whose age has been validated.
- João Marinho Neto (born 5 October 1912) of Brazil is the world's oldest living man whose age has been validated.

== Oldest living people ==
Rank	Name	Sex	Birth date	Age as of 22 November 2026	Country of residence
1	Ethel Caterham	F	21 August 1909	117 years, 93 days	United Kingdom
2	Naomi Whitehead	F	26 September 1910	116 years, 57 days	United States
3	Lucia Laura Sangenito	F	22 November 1910	116 years, 0 days	Italy
4	Yolanda Beltrão de Azevedo	F	13 January 1911	115 years, 313 days	Brazil
5	Beatriz Ferreira Duarte	F	21 June 1911	115 years, 154 days	Brazil
6	Fuyo Kishimoto	F	20 December 1911	114 years, 337 days	Japan
7	Madeleine Dellamonica	F	23 July 1912	114 years, 122 days	France
8	Anonymous (of Ashiya)	F	18 September 1912	114 years, 65 days	Japan
9	João Marinho Neto	M	5 October 1912	114 years, 48 days	Brazil
10	Catherine Ferrell	F	10 October 1912	114 years, 43 days	United States
11	Anonymous (of Kimitsu)	F	30 October 1912	114 years, 23 days	Japan
12	Merah Smith	F	9 November 1912	114 years, 13 days	United Kingdom (Note: Smith was born in Jamaica.)
13	Anna Natella	F	21 November 1912	114 years, 1 day	United States (Note: Natella was born in Italy.)
14	Yukie Takahashi	F	4 January 1913	113 years, 322 days	Japan
15	Eulalia Bravo Bravo	F	12 February 1913	113 years, 283 days	Mexico
16	Mollie Horwitz	F	16 March 1913	113 years, 251 days	United States (Note: Horwitz was born in the Russian Empire, now Lithuania.)
17	Francis Piscatella	F	20 April 1913	113 years, 216 days	United States
18	Ichi Kubota	F	30 May 1913	113 years, 176 days	Japan
19	Dorothy Mimms	F	5 July 1913	113 years, 140 days	United States
20	Koyu Morita	F	12 July 1913	113 years, 133 days	Japan
21	Luisa Maggioni	F	19 July 1913	113 years, 126 days	Brazil
22	Rosa Laura Torres Barra	F	20 July 1913	113 years, 125 days	Chile
23	Teresa Fernández Casado	F	29 July 1913	113 years, 116 days	Spain
24	Felicidad Hernández Corredera	F	11 August 1913	113 years, 103 days	Spain
25	Chitose Awata	F	20 August 1913	113 years, 94 days	Japan
26	Kiyoko Kondō	F	1 September 1913	113 years, 82 days	Japan
27	Aileen Kars	F	12 September 1913	113 years, 71 days	New Zealand
28	Doris Noreen	F	15 September 1913	113 years, 68 days	United States
29	Ken Weeks	M	5 October 1913	113 years, 48 days	Australia
30	Tsutae Hayashi	F	28 October 1913	113 years, 25 days	Japan
31	Zoraida Montezuma	F	31 October 1913	113 years, 22 days	Costa Rica
32	Take Sato	F	21 November 1913	113 years, 1 day	Japan
33	Andrea Álvarez Cortés	F	23 November 1913	112 years, 364 days	Mexico
34	Toshiko Miyoshi	F	2 January 1914	112 years, 324 days	Japan
35	Elizabeth Werrenrath	F	28 January 1914	112 years, 298 days	United States
36	Fumi Seino	F	2 February 1914	112 years, 293 days	Japan
37	Masumi Goto	F	15 February 1914	112 years, 280 days	Japan
38	Hilda Luck	F	19 February 1914	112 years, 276 days	United Kingdom
39	Marie-Louise Pellet	F	7 March 1914	112 years, 260 days	France
40	Kirsten Schwalbe	F	10 March 1914	112 years, 257 days	Denmark
41	Setsu Sugahara	F	22 March 1914	112 years, 245 days	Japan
42	Irene Laroche	F	23 March 1914	112 years, 244 days	France
43	Marjorie Hodnett	F	1 April 1914	112 years, 235 days	United Kingdom
44	Josefa Maria da Conceição	F	4 April 1914	112 years, 232 days	Brazil
45	Hikaru Katō	M	2 May 1914	112 years, 204 days	Japan
46	Minnie Mae Walker	F	6 May 1914	112 years, 200 days	United States
47	Sono Yamamoto	F	20 May 1914	112 years, 186 days	Japan
48	Esther Dalton	F	5 June 1914	112 years, 170 days	United Kingdom
49	Hattie Mae Allen	F	8 June 1914	112 years, 167 days	United States
50	Modesta Villalobos Brito	F	15 June 1914	112 years, 160 days	Mexico

== Oldest living men ==
Rank	Name	Birth date	Age as of 22 November 2026	Country of residence
1	João Marinho Neto	5 October 1912	114 years, 48 days	Brazil
2	Ken Weeks	5 October 1913	113 years, 48 days	Australia
3	Hikaru Katō	2 May 1914	112 years, 204 days	Japan
4	Tokuji Tanigaki	8 November 1914	112 years, 14 days	Japan
5	Pedro María Molina Márquez	27 April 1915	111 years, 209 days	Venezuela
6	Joaquim Varela	1 June 1915	111 years, 174 days	Portugal
7	Jesús Redondo Bermejo	2 June 1915	111 years, 173 days	Spain
8	Juan Mijares Camargo	28 June 1915	111 years, 147 days	Venezuela
9	Juan Bautista Quiróz Pití	29 August 1915	111 years, 85 days	Panama
10	Hugh Kerr	9 October 1915	111 years, 44 days	United Kingdom
11	Bill Morgan	23 October 1915	111 years, 30 days	Australia
12	Iosif Rus	28 October 1915	111 years, 25 days	Romania
13	Otoji Hasegawa	3 December 1915	110 years, 354 days	Brazil (Note: Hasegawa was born in Japan.)
14	James Clayton Flowers	25 December 1915	110 years, 332 days	United States
15	Higinio Velasco Cisneros	11 January 1916	110 years, 315 days	Mexico
16	Canuto Gonzalez Brito	19 January 1916	110 years, 307 days	Paraguay
17	Iwatarō Hiramori	16 May 1916	110 years, 190 days	Japan
18	Al Taubman	2 June 1916	110 years, 173 days	United States
19	Geraldo Rezende Trindade	3 June 1916	110 years, 172 days	Brazil
20	Manuel Martínez Milán	18 June 1916	110 years, 157 days	Puerto Rico
