= Zinsco =

Manufacturing company

Zinsco was a manufacturer of electrical distribution panels and circuit breakers, founded by Emile Martin Zinsmeyer and his son Martin Emile Zinsmeyer in the early 1930s.

== History ==
Frank Adam Electric, a manufacturer of electrical panels and circuit breakers, was founded in 1891 as part of the Blacker and Adam Watch Company in St. Louis, Missouri. In 1928, a young sales manager named Emile Zinsmeyer took charge of Frank Adam Electric's western division in Los Angeles. In the latter part of the Great Depression, Emile negotiated to buy Frank Adam's west coast stock, forming Zinsmeyer Company. Frank Adam Electric would continue manufacturing panels and breakers through the 1950s, and they are now extremely rare.

Located at 729 Turner Street in Los Angeles, the Zinsmeyer Company would soon undergo some changes. Zinsmeyer employed two of his sons, Wilford, who went by Bill, and Martin. In 1943, Martin bought the company from his father and renamed it Zinsco Electric. Almost immediately, Zinsco began development of new panel and circuit breaker designs, with patent applications dating back to 1946. The first Zinsco panels contained copper bus-bars and copper breaker clips. Original breakers were patented in 1950 and labeled “Magnatrip.” Five additional patents would be issued for subsequent designs. These early breakers employed copper bus-clips, which matched the copper bus-bars in these panels.

Prior to World War II, the only permissible electrical conductors were copper, gold, and silver. A copper shortage during the war promoted code changes. Although aluminum was initially expensive to manufacture, advancements in the processing and production of aluminum wire made it available by 1942 and it was added to the National Electrical Code. In 1952, the Korean War would cause another major copper shortage in the U.S. Although some companies, such as FPE and Square-D, continued to use an all-copper design, other manufacturers switched to an aluminum alloy for bus bars and breakers. Zinsco would remain with copper in both their panels and breakers until the third major copper shortage in the early 1960s, when they would switch to an aluminum bus. In 1963, Zinsco introduced the R-38 twin breaker, which was the only twin circuit breaker that also made contact on both bus-bars for 240 volts in a single breaker space. This made the Zinsco brand hugely popular with contractors and millions of Zinsco service panels and load centers were installed through the 60s and 70s.

In 1973, Martin Zinsmeyer sold the Zinsco Electric Company to GTE-Sylvania. During that ownership, the product line remained the same, with new labeling and branding, while dropping the “Magnatrip” label. In 1978, the line changed names again, and was re-labeled Challenger.

By 1981, GTE-Sylvania divested itself of the electrical distribution business and sold off its product lines and manufacturing facilities. The Challenger line, mostly manufactured at the time in Jackson, Mississippi, was sold to a former officer of GTE, who used the Challenger name as the name of his new company, Challenger Electrical Equipment Corporation.

The new Challenger Brand immediately ceased production of any new Zinsco frame panels and load-centers, but still produced the re-branded Zinsco circuit breaker line. Challenger concentrated on a new line of panel equipment using the same bus configuration proven with Murray, Crouse-Hinds, and others. But, from 1982 until 1994, the 200-amp service panels used a Zinsco frame main breaker. Challenger flourished through the 80s, and was eventually received by Westinghouse in a multi-asset deal, in order for Westinghouse to sell its remaining electrical manufacturing facilities to Eaton Corporation in 1994. Both Challenger and Thomas & Betts (T&B) had manufacturing facilities in Mississippi, where T&B received the Zinsco circuit breaker molds. T&B then continued to fabricate and sell the breakers under their own label, tripling the price at that time, from about $7.00 for the popular R-38 twin breaker to $19.00. T&B would eventually close the Zinsco circuit breaker production altogether in 2005. Today, Connecticut Electric continues making Zinsco replacement tin coated copper bus bar kits and breakers.

== Safety concerns ==
The copper shortage of the 1960s was primarily caused by the US government, which had huge contracts out, many of which were for air-conditioning, requiring over a million new copper coils. This action depressed the market of available copper for other manufacturing needs and promoted the first real demand for aluminum NM cable. When Zinsco changed to an aluminum bus, the aluminum selected was Alloy 6061. First developed in 1935, Alloy 6061 is a good conductor, a hard aluminum, and still a popular alloy for welding today. But in 1961, another aluminum alloy was developed: 6101. This alloy has a higher tensile strength and is the best conductor for electrical use. It is the aluminum used in the current aluminum busing of panels and load-centers.

But Alloy 6061 continued to be used, both in wiring and in electrical panels. From 1964 to 1972, 6061 aluminum wire and quick-wire receptacles were being installed in over two million homes, particularly tract homes. This wire was inferior, and the aluminum had tremendous expansion and contraction between power consumption and rest. Since power outlets were also constructed of dissimilar metals, the receptacles caused the aluminum to oxidize. Oxidization of aluminum creates aluminum oxide, which insulates rather than conducts. This caused numerous fires, outlet burn-outs, and nearly 100 deaths as published by the NFPA. Because of this, aluminum wiring received a very bad reputation.

In 1972 aluminum was changed from an inferior product and into a modified alloy. Modern aluminum wire is an AA800 series alloy, which has a higher tensile strength, so it undergoes less expansion and contraction. This change was also followed in the late 90s by CO-ALR rated receptacles as a requirement in aluminum device wiring. Since that time, aluminum for anything smaller than 8-gauge wiring has virtually disappeared.

Currently, Zinsco electrical equipment is considered obsolete due to a design flaw in which the circuit breaker's connection to the bus bar becomes loose, causing arcing and subsequent overheating. Long-term exposure to this heat can cause the breaker to fuse to the bus bar, making it impossible to remove. Even worse, it can cause the breaker's contacts to fuse together, thus preventing the breaker from tripping even in an overcurrent situation, thereby causing a potential fire hazard.

== Replacement parts ==
Aftermarket replacements for the Zinsco breakers are available; however, it may be more cost effective simply to replace the entire panel with a more modern and safer design from another manufacturer (such as Eaton, General Electric, Siemens, or Square D), depending on the number of breakers to be replaced. If the bus bar shows signs of corrosion, or if any of the breakers show signs of overheating, the panel should be replaced entirely. Many electricians advocate replacement of the panel in any case, due to its historically poor reliability.

Manufactures of Zinsco Style Breakers:

- Zinsco
- Sylvania and GTE-Sylvania
- Challenger
- Kearney
- Milbank
- Thomas & Betts
- Connecticut Electric - Unique Breakers Inc. (UBI)

== See also ==
- Aluminum building wiring
