= Sarah Knauss =

American supercentenarian (1880–1999)

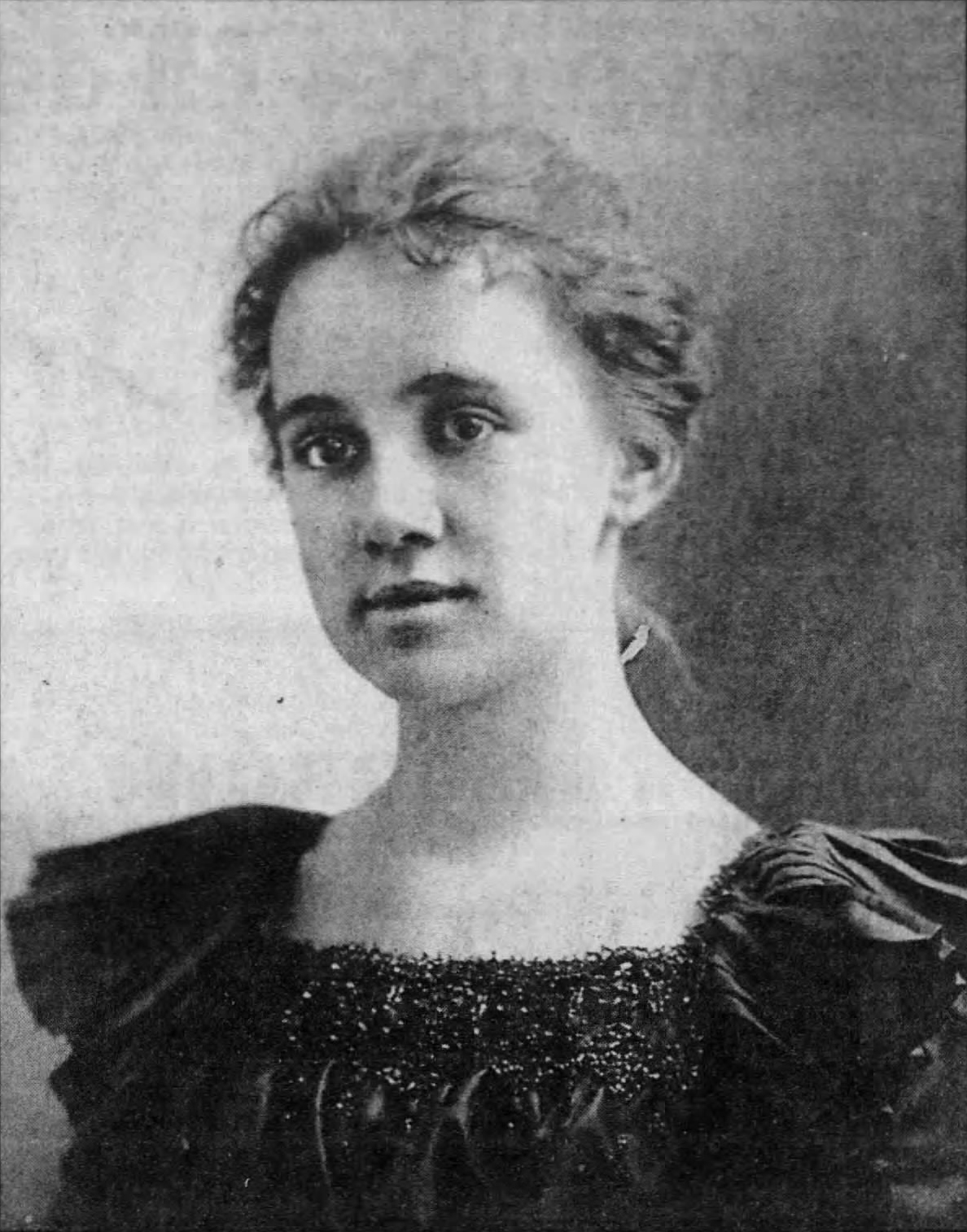
- Clark in 1897
- Born: Sarah DeRemer Clark; September 24, 1880; Hollywood, Pennsylvania, U.S.
- Died: December 30, 1999 (aged 119 years, 97 days); Allentown, Pennsylvania, U.S.
- Known for: Oldest known living person (16 April 1998 – 30 December 1999); Oldest American ever; Third-oldest verified person
- Spouse: Abraham Lincoln Knauss (m. 1901; died 1965)
- Children: 1

Sarah DeRemer Knauss (née Clark; September 24, 1880 – December 30, 1999) was an American supercentenarian. She is the oldest person ever from the United States and, on April 16, 1998, became the world's oldest living person. She is the third-oldest verified person ever, living to the age of 119 years and 97 days. Her birthdate has been independently verified through numerous census and other records.

== Early life ==
Sarah DeRemer Clark was born on September 24, 1880, to Walter Clark and his wife Amelia, the daughter of German immigrants, in Hollywood, Pennsylvania, a small coal mining community in the Coal Region of Northeastern Pennsylvania. She was the third of her parents' seven children, but three of her brothers died in infancy and childhood.

Her family later moved to South Bethlehem, Pennsylvania, in the Lehigh Valley region of the state.

== Personal life ==
In 1901, at 20 years old, she married Abraham Lincoln Knauss (1878–1965). Abraham was a tanner who later became a prominent Republican leader and the recorder of deeds in Lehigh County, Pennsylvania, serving as the county's recorder of deeds from 1937 until his retirement in 1951. Abraham died in 1965, at the age of 86. They had one child, Kathryn (1903–2005), who lived to be 101. Through most of her life, Knauss acted as a housewife. She enjoyed knitting, crocheting, and sewing.

Before Knauss' death, there were six living generations in her family. In February 1999, Life magazine photographed Knauss with a member from each of these generations, up to her newborn great-great-great-grandchild.

== Health and lifestyle ==
It was not until Knauss reached 111 years old that she took up residency at a nursing home in Allentown, Pennsylvania, due to her frailness and failing eyesight. In 1995, Knauss remarked that she enjoyed her life because she still had her health and could "do things". At 117 years old, Knauss underwent a blood transfusion due to having low haemoglobin, and she continued to take heart medication for the rest of her life. Those around her believed her to be of sound mind up until her death. Within the last year of her life, she still had conversations with her daughter Kathryn. Eventually, she struggled to recognize her daughter; however, this may have been due to her failing hearing and eyesight rather than a failing mind.

When asked how she had survived to her great age, Knauss responded that one should “keep yourself busy, work hard, and not worry about how old you are.” She was a non-smoker and was never considered obese at any point in her life. She did have a fondness for sweets, however, and her great-granddaughter claimed that Knauss "hated vegetables". A member of the staff at Knauss's nursing home claimed that she was the friendliest of all residents at the home, and her relatives failed to remember a point in her life that she scolded anyone or even appeared stressed.

== Death ==
Knauss died of natural causes on December 30, 1999 in Allentown, Pennsylvania. An autopsy was performed on her body, but the results were never made public; however, she was not known to have been suffering from any illness at the time of her death. After her death, Ella Miller (1884–2000) became the world's oldest living person.

Knauss remained the second oldest known validated person until Kane Tanaka, whose lifespan was longer by 10 days in April 2022.

== Longevity records and verification ==
Knauss became the United States' national longevity record holder after surpassing the final age of Delphia Welford (1875–1992) on November 30, 1997. On April 16, 1998, she became the world's oldest living person after 117-year-old French Canadian Marie-Louise Meilleur died. Knauss remains the oldest documented person from the United States, and is the third-oldest fully documented person ever, after French supercentenarian Jeanne Calment and Japanese supercentenarian Kane Tanaka, whose lifespan was longer by 10 days. She was recognized as the world's oldest living person by Guinness World Records from April 16, 1998, until her death the next year at the age of 119 years and 97 days.

Knauss's records have been heavily reviewed to ensure the claims surrounding her lifespan are legitimate. Many records have been found that verify her claim, including a copy of her 1890 census entry in an 1890 US Census Directory for Northampton County, Pennsylvania (where she and her family lived back then) by Joseph H. Werner, created in 1891 when Knauss was around 10-11. (Note: One can find the full text copy of the 1890 US Census Directory for Northampton County at the Marx Room (see Henry F. Marx Local History Room for access) at the Easton Area Public Library.)

== See also ==
- List of the verified oldest people
