= Allentown Public Library =

Public library in Pennsylvania, U.S.

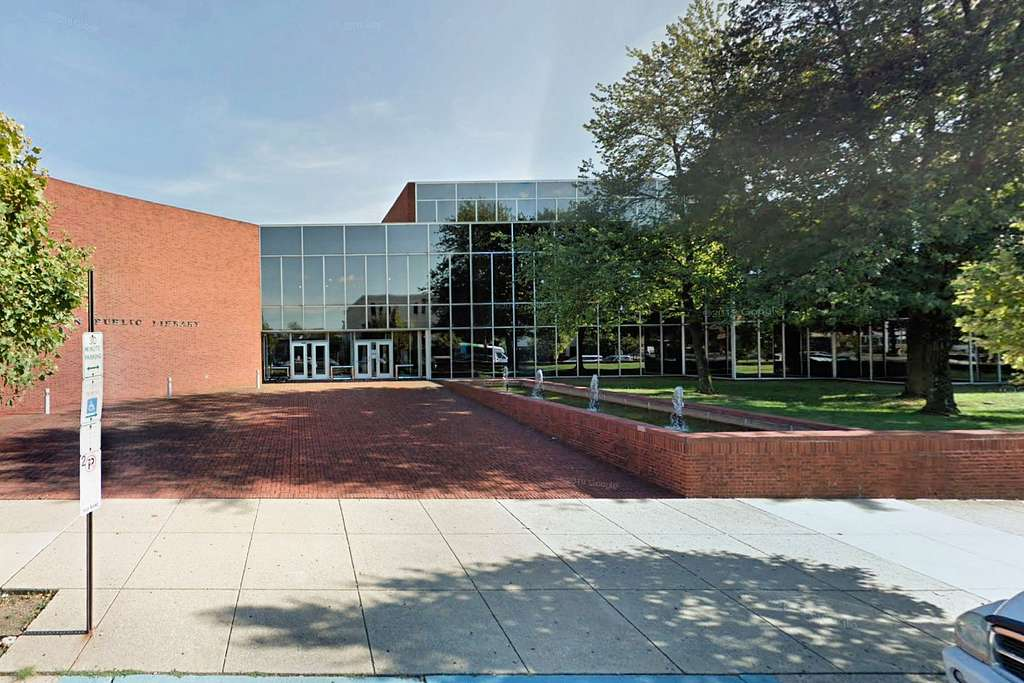
- Entrance to Allentown Public Library in 2020
- 40.5990°N 75.4821°W
- Location: 1210 Hamilton Street, Allentown, Pennsylvania, U.S.
- Established: November 25, 1912; 113 years ago
- Branches: 1

Other information
- Website: www.allentownpl.org

Allentown Public Library is a public library in Allentown, Pennsylvania, United States. It was first established at 914 Hamilton Street in 1912, and was later relocated to 1210 Hamilton Street in 1978. It consists of a single location as the headquarters. The library previously had three branches; Northeast, East, and a South Branch.

The library includes a local history room and an acrylic portrait of Raphael's The School of Athens by Paul Harryn.

== History ==
=== 19th century ===
A visual history of the locations of the Allentown Public Library and its branches

Allentown first had an "English Language Circulating Library" in 1810, located in the house of Colonel George Rhoads. Mr. and Mrs. Robert C. Chandler, of the Fratres Literarum (Brothers of Literature), formed the F. L. Library at the Allentown Academy in 1853. After the Fratres Literarium disbanded, taxidermist Fritz Warner founded the Academy of Natural Science, Art, and Literature and inherited the contents of the F.L. Library. On New Year's Eve 1874, Warner attended a colonial-themed fundraiser held by Mary Lewis. Mary was the wife of Samuel B. Lewis, who worked in the iron industry. After Warner's taxidermy business failed, the Odd Fellows fraternal order kept the collection in the Breinig & Bachman building at 6th and Hamilton streets. In 1893, nearly all these books were lost in a fire.

==== Girls' Reading Room ====
The Girls' Reading Room Association held monthly meetings at the Girls' Parlor, at 639 Hamilton Street, in the late 1800s, at the same location where Woman's Christian Temperance Union (WCTU) meetings were held. The Girls' Reading Room celebrated its 8th anniversary in 1895, with Mrs. Yeager presiding. The room had 334 books at the time.

On September 5, 1895, the Allentown Leader published an article, asking, "While we're on the new library subject, what has become of the efforts made by the Women's League and other organizations in times past?" It suggested spending $1000 on an "experimental library", which would be the "humble beginning of a public library that some day Allentown might be thoroughly proud of." In response to this request, the paper printed a letter to the editor on September 7, which read, "I must make a plea for the Girls' Reading Room Association, seeing that you are advocating a free library." The letter referred to this association as a potential "nucleus" for a public library, and noted that "so far no endowments have ever been dreamed of by the workers, who, by the way, give their labor free." A second letter, printed on the same page, praised the Girls' Reading Room library and suggested that the library advertise itself better to the city. "If it were well understood, which we don't believe it is, that here were some shelves full of books that were free to the public, or a portion of it, and that the shelves contained such books as girls and young women delight to read...we believe the patronage and appreciation of these good women's work would be far more widespread than it is now, and that the enlargement of the library and the work would be more speedy," the letter read.

In response to these letters, the president of the Girls' Reading Room wrote a clarifying letter to the editor, calling the previous letters "misleading" and stating that the purpose of the Girls' Reading Room was to provide "a place where the working girls and working women of our city could find pleasant associations and rest after the day's toil, and where...they would be inspired to lead pure and useful lives." The President insisted that the Girls' Reading Room could never "form the foundation of Allentown's future public library."

In January 1896, the Allentown Leader observed that Allentown was not making progress in starting a public library, and claimed that the school board had authority to levy a tax in order to gather "a good collection of books for public use at very trifling cost to taxpayers." In 1898, WCTU announced that it would convert the Girls' Parlor and Reading Room into a Young Woman's Christian Association.

==== Women's League ====
In 1890, a number of women formed the "Women's League" of Allentown, "for the purpose of self-improvement and to take up such work as might be of public benefit." The Women's League began to hold a Kalendar Fest, or "Kirmess", in order to secure funds to establish "the nucleus of a public library in the near future." The first such entertainment was an operetta called "Voices of Nature" by Mrs. E. B. Byington, on February 7, 1891. The Women's League then presented a series of entertainments entitled "The Kirmess" in Lehigh Valley Hall, from May 26 to June 2, 1891. This series consisted of dances, plays, operas, and tableaux, and raised $1200. Mary Lewis, then president of the Women's League, led a committee to begin a library at the Allentown Oratorio Society, located at 37–39 S. 7th Street. In 1898 the Women's League, by then renamed the Women's Literary Society, invited "Academy pupils" and "friends of the library work" to attend a series of exercises at the Oratorio Society on June 2. These exercises consisted of music arranged by Mrs. S. J. Brobst, addresses made by R. E. Wright, Esq. and Dr. G. T. Ettinger, singing by a select chorus, and a "novel feature in the form of a book charade."

In August 1898, Allentown Public Library at 37 S. 7th Street opened to the public, every Thursday and Saturday. Annual dues were "$3 a year or 25 cents a month." The librarian was Mrs. Joseph Schreiber, the assistant was Miss Clara Kistler, and the collection had "between 700 and 800 volumes." The library consisted of two rooms on the second floor of the building, "the one in the rear being the library proper, while the one facing 7th Street is the reading room. The latter is large, comfortable and well lighted, being in every sense an ideal place for an hour or two of quiet reading or research." In January 1904, the library on S. 7th Street had 1406 volumes, 95 subscribers, and reported a total of 3899 checkouts in 1903. In 1907, the staff was "composed of Miss Sara Deifer, Librarian; Parke Sherer assistant Librarian and Miss Jeanie Weaber Emergency Librarian."

== Main Branch (1912–1978) ==
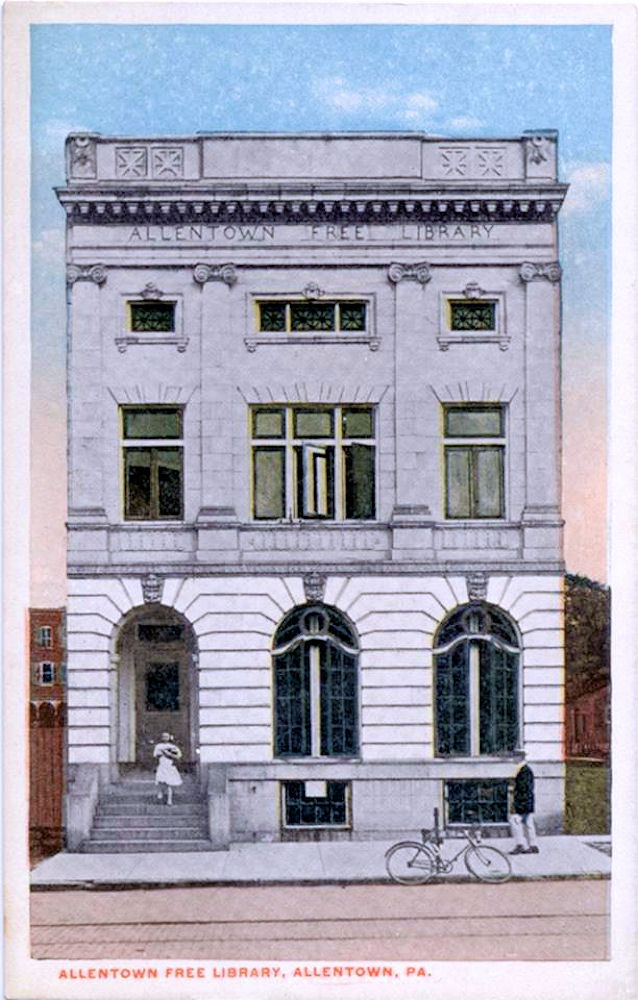
A 1915 illustration of the Main Branch of the Allentown Public Library

=== Planning and funding ===
In 1907, Mrs. Blanche Travena, nee Phifer, the acknowledged "prime moving spirit of the M. U. M. Circle," asked Mrs. Samuel B. Lewis for a suggestion for a use of the Circle's surplus funds. Mrs. Lewis, then president of the Women's League, suggested working for the Allentown Free Library. This led to the M. U. M. eventually purchasing a property on Hamilton Street.

In 1907, the property on 914 Hamilton Street in Allentown was withdrawn from a bid of $10,600. The estate on the property was a house belonging to Charles Nagle and Anna D. Nagle. In July 1908, M. U. M. (Members Until Married) Circle commissioned the architect L. S. Jacoby to begin plans for the construction of a public library on 914 Hamilton Street. Later in July, the property at 914 Hamilton was transferred from Charles H. Nagle to Beulah G. Phifer for $15,000, and then transferred to the Allentown Free Library Association for the same amount.

In September 1908, M.U.M. Circle gave a contract to erect the Allentown Public Library at 914 Hamilton Street, to O. C. Donecker for $8200. The architects were listed as "Jacoby & Weishampel." In 1908, Building Inspector Frank R. Minner issued a building permit to O. C. Donecker, "for the Public Library building, 29 by 73 feet, three stories high, at 914 Hamilton Street."

In 1910, The Allentown Democrat expressed dismay that in the "library building on Hamilton street, west of Ninth," the rooms were "barren of shelves and books" and the newspaper desired to see this building "properly equipped." The Democrat publicly "expressed a willingness to contribute one hundred dollars toward this worthy object." The Allentown "Footlight Club" put on a performance that same year "for the benefit of the public library fund." On January 26, 1911, an "unusual array of speakers" addressed the public at a meeting at the Lyric Theater, "in the interest of the public library movement." These speakers included Thomas Lynch Montgomery, the state librarian of Harrisburg, President J. A. W. Haas of Muhlenberg College, President W. F. Curtis of the Allentown College for Women, and Mayor Charles O. Hunsicker. At the meeting, the committee in charge of the public library reported that they had solicited funds for the library "amounting to $1500." Mayor Hunsicker told the audience, "The City of Allentown is exceptionally fortunate. The religious and educational advantages afforded are splendid. But we need a public library." In January 1912, the Chamber of Commerce moved to a section of the building on 914 Hamilton Street.

=== Campaign to pay debt ===
On February 23, 1912, Allentown Public Library collection was moved from the Oratorio Society on 7th Street to "its permanent new home in the fine Allentown Public Library building at 914 Hamilton St., where it will be conducted as a subscription library until the management can secure a regular appropriation that will make it possible for the library to be entirely free to the citizens of Allentown." The library held nearly three thousand volumes at the time. Dr. George T. Ettinger, President of the Allentown Public Library Association, reported that he received "letters and verbal assurances from all classes of our citizens" that signified that wanted to contribute to this cause, "not only to liquidate the indebtedness on the property at No. 914 Hamilton street, but also to provide a fund for equipment and additional books."

The advisory board of Allentown public schools reviewed the plans for the "debt clearing campaign" for the new public library on March 1, 1912. The board "unanimously voted to give every pupil in the public schools an opportunity to assist in the movement by contribution toward it," in the form of coin envelopes. It was noted that, at the time, the "Allentown Public Library" was a "corporation chartered by the commonwealth and belongs to the people. The library association of which Dr. Geo. T. Ettinger is the president, is in absolute control of the institution. As soon as the money is raised for the paying of the debts now resting on it, as well as the necessary funds for the equipment and necessary running expenses, it will cease to be a subscription library and become absolutely free for all the people."

On March 18, the Allentown Democrat reported that donations had added up to $12,241, which liquidated "all debts against the Allentown Free Library." The following day, the amount was amended to $12,757. Professor William H. Rees donated a copy of the Century Dictionary to the library.

In November 1912, the original mortgage was finally settled, and the building was officially freed from debt. According to the article, "The librarian shall have charge and superintendence of the building and property of the library and of all the books and other property contained in them, and shall be responsible for the exercise of due care for the safety thereof." Though the article does not name the librarian, it does mention a "Miss Lewis" who would receive visitors in the library.

=== Opening ===
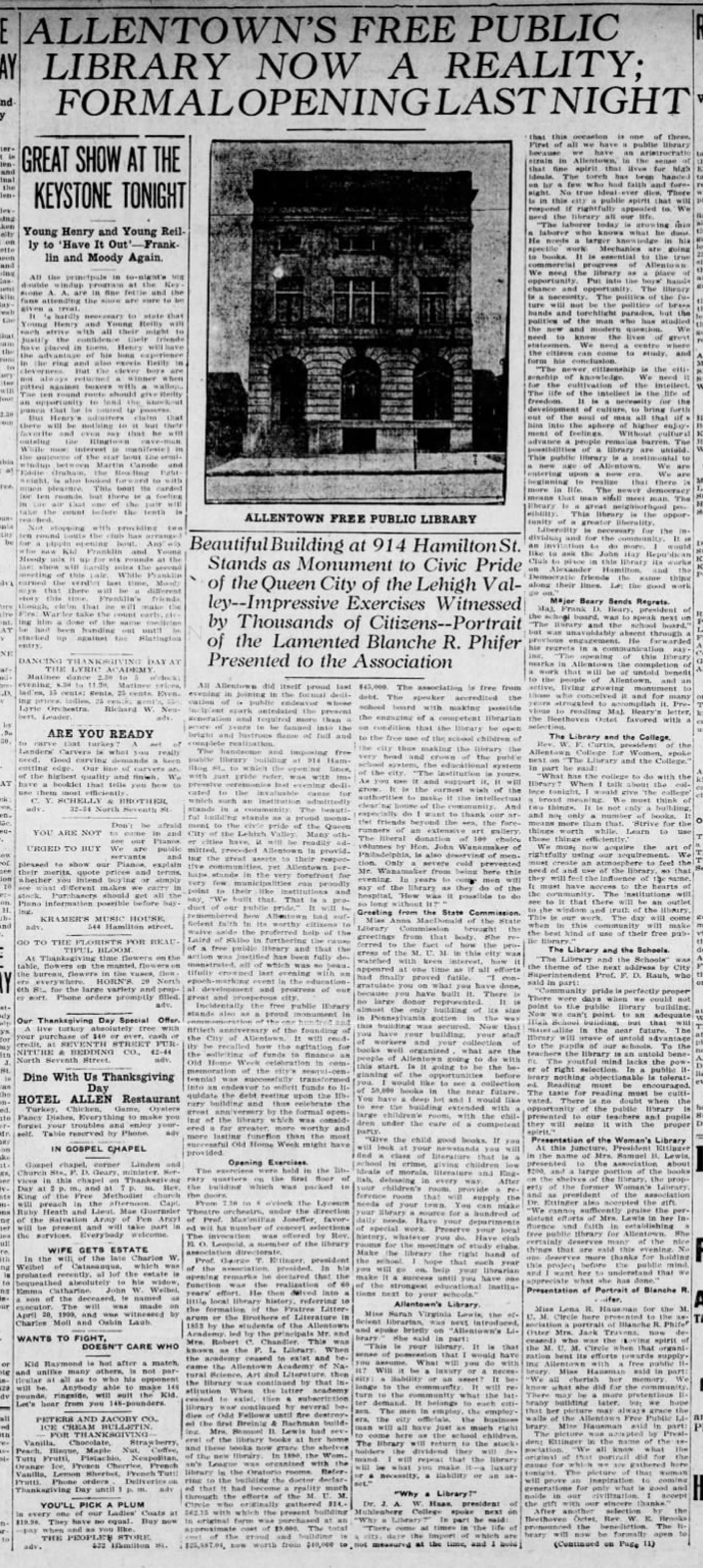
Opening of the Allentown Public Library on November 25, 1912

In addition to Sarah V. Lewis, several assistants helped to catalog and repair around 3500 books: Florence Hergesheimer, Julia Kramer, Anna Ritter, Anna A. Schadt, and Mabel Thompson. Allentown Public Library formally opened on November 25, 1912, for an evening ceremony at 8 p.m. Miss Sarah Virginia Lewis was "the local Librarian." The article that day also states that Mrs. Samuel B. Lewis, unrelated to the two Lewises mentioned, "representing the Woman's Literary Club, forerunner of the Library" would be at the opening. The article mentions that the library building would have the paintings The Village of Montmorency by Lehigh County native Peter Alfred Gross, Port of Marseilles by Johanes Martin Grimelund, a landscape by A. N. Lindenmuth, and "an oil painting of Mrs. Jack Travena, nee Blanche Phifer, who did so much for the cause," also by Lindenmuth. The library's dedication was a success, drawing thousands of citizens. Addresses by Miss Sarah Virginia Lewis, "the efficient librarian", Miss Anna MacDonald of the State Library Commission, Dr. Haas, then president of Muhlenberg College, and others.

=== Budget issues and merger ===
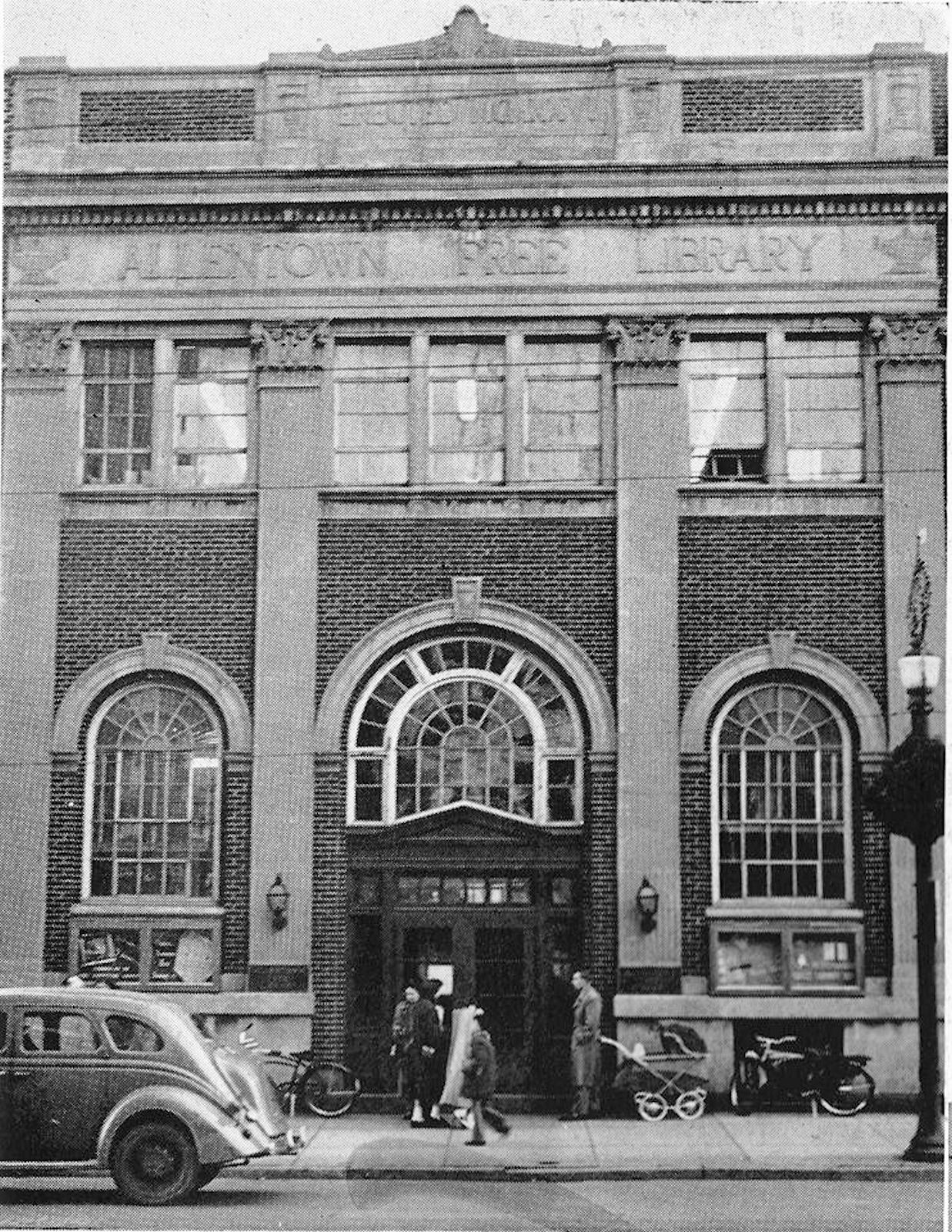
Allentown Free Library in 1940

The Chamber of Commerce continued to meet in the library building in 1913, under President George T. Hersh and Secretary Harry I. Koch. The number of volumes in the library was then estimated at 4500, and the custodians reported a large demand for industrial books in Allentown. Miss Sarah Lewis, the "able and cultured librarian," proposed that Allentown could be "a field for one of the greatest technical libraries in the country." Under the school code, the Allentown school board needed to provide funds for the maintenance of the library.

The capital required for some of the library's purchases, however, appeared to be beyond the school board's budget, and at a meeting on May 9, the "very vital business of presenting the school budget for this year was postponed." The library board's requested budget was slightly less than that of Easton Library, which was reported as $9,000 a year. Nevertheless, the Allentown Public Library's future was thrown into doubt. The Allentown library association presented the school board with a budget of $8,425 for the next fiscal year, an amount the school board was reluctant to provide. Some "friends of the institution" agreed with a suggestion that the "library association turn over the entire building, contents, etc., to the school board." The Allentown Democrat predicted that, "if the school board will not or cannot take care of the library in a financial way, its doors may have to be closed and the city of Allentown would lose its prestige as a progressive city."

The Allentown Leader published a coupon that readers could cut out, sign, and mail to the school board, requesting that the board appropriate the amount required for the maintenance of Allentown Free Public Library. The Allentown Leader later printed the names of people who signed a petition to the school board: "business men, professional men, laborers, artisans and mechanics – who ask that the School Board appropriate enough to keep the Library open." The Leader also reported that, "Easton has a library tax and so have other cities. It needs but an action at law to establish one here, but it ought not to be necessary to resort to that." Sarah V. Lewis, the librarian, offered to resign in spring 1913, in order to save the library board from having to pay her salary, but the library board refused to accept her resignation. The school board eventually approved an appropriation of $2,500. Some members attempted to appropriate $5000 or $4000 but were voted down.

The Allentown School Board offered to take over the library during a meeting on May 23. The Library board agreed to meet Tuesday evening, to discuss turning the property over to the school board. The Allentown Leader theorized that, while the mere $2,500 would result in the library becoming a "bookless thing," the school board could take over the library and stock its shelves with books so that the library would be "a living factor in the educational advancement of the city." In July, the library board of directors voted to authorize the librarian to purchase recent fiction and charge the patrons five cents per book "until the cost of the respective volumes has been covered." The board approved this method of funding due the library's limited finances, in spite of a recent donation "from a young lady of this city."

=== Continued growth ===
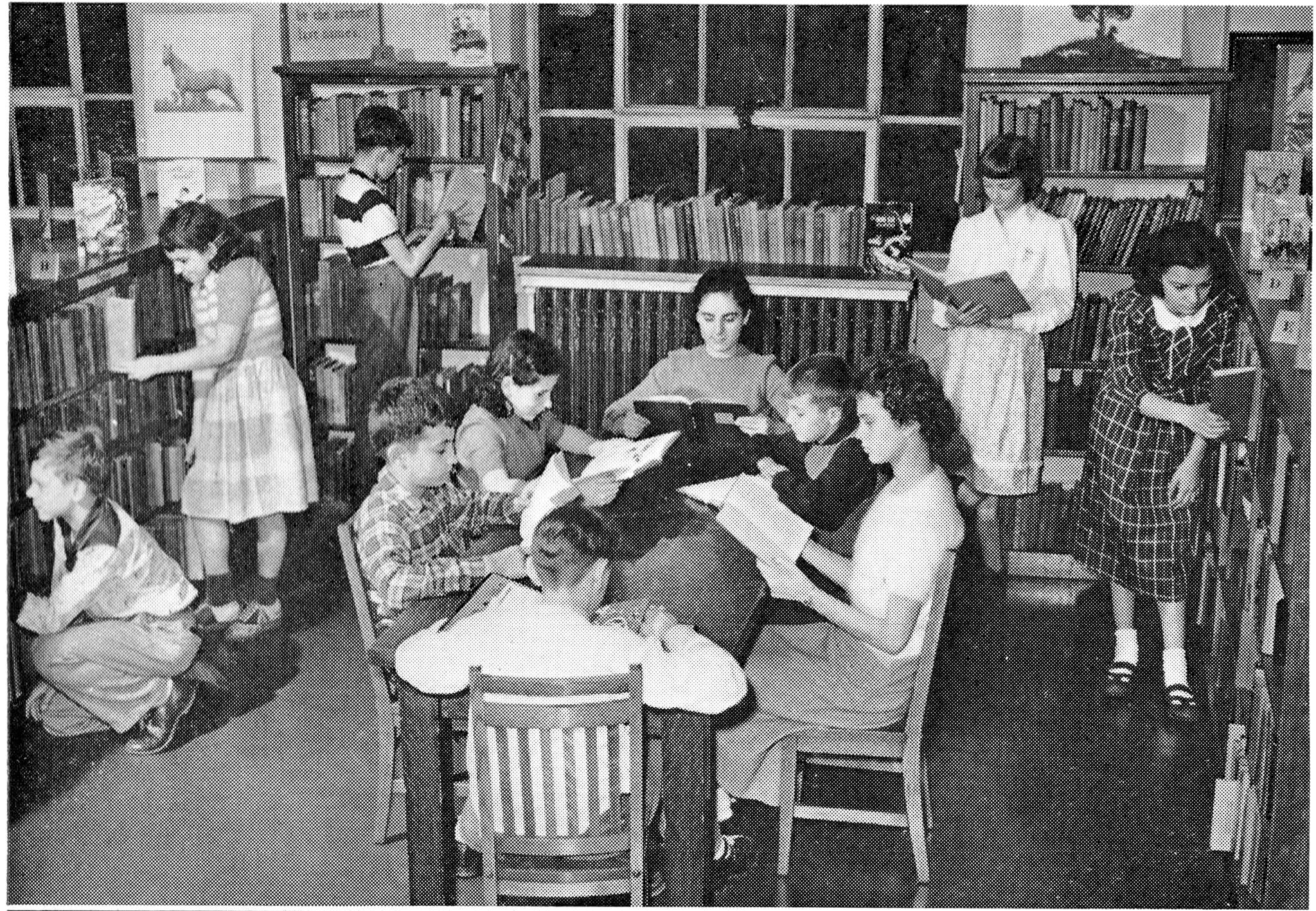
Childrens Reading Room at the Allentown Free Library in 1945

Sarah Virginia Lewis resigned from her position at Allentown Free Library in July 1914. She had accepted a new position at the Carnegie Library in Pittsburgh. It was estimated then that the library had 6,400 books and 7,200 borrowers. Miss Isabel McC. Turner was elected librarian in Sarah Lewis's place.

The Allentown School Board listed the library's expenditure as $5,000 in 1915. In 1916, the Allentown School Board raised the tax rate for appropriations that were "the largest in the history of the school district." They appropriated $7,500 for the Free Public Library. In 1917, the Allentown School Board's estimated budget included $7,500 for the library. In 1918, the school board's estimated budget reported $8000 set aside for the free library.

In January 1950, The Morning Call reported that the Allentown Free Library had 86,657 volumes.

== Main Branch (1978–present) ==
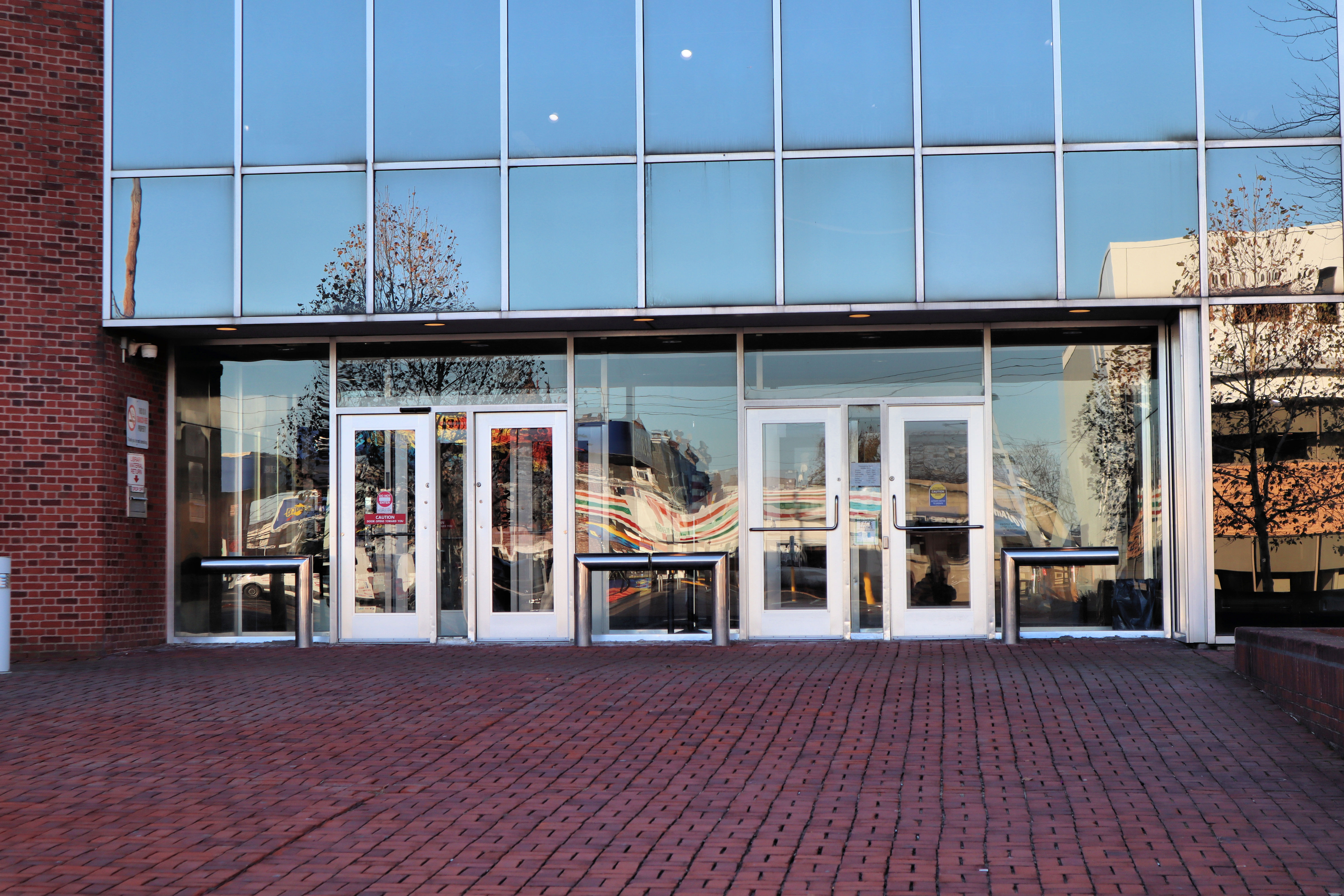
Allentown Public Library in 2021

=== Campaign for new building ===
In May 1975, Allentown School Board mentioned in a report that they might need a "bond issue of $1 million–$1.5 million" for a new location for the public library. The board approved the bond issue later that month, initiating a plan to construct a new building on 12th and Hamilton streets, and bounded by Jefferson and Maple streets. They estimated that the library would cost $2.8 million. Henry Moggio, president of the library board, proposed a committee to select people to serve in a campaign for the new library. In July, the Allentown School District purchased a brownstone house at 1204 Hamilton Street, for $43,000. The school district also acquired the property on the southwest part of the 1200 Hamilton block, where the Asbury Methodist Church once stood before it was consumed by a fire, to be converted into a parking lot.

Architects Robert J. Breslin and Edward C. Fadero began designing the new library. They proposed a three-floor building, with 19,000 square feet on the main level, two elevators, and a 36-car parking lot. The cost, at this time, was estimated at $3.3 million. In August, the school board approved the preliminary plan of Breslin Ridyard Fadero, the architectural firm, and authorized them to begin work on the new library building. The Rev. Dr. Grant E. Harrity presided over the school board during this decision. The Allentown Public Library Board began advertising for bids for the demolition of the old brownstone building at 1202–1204 Hamilton Street.

=== Funding and construction ===
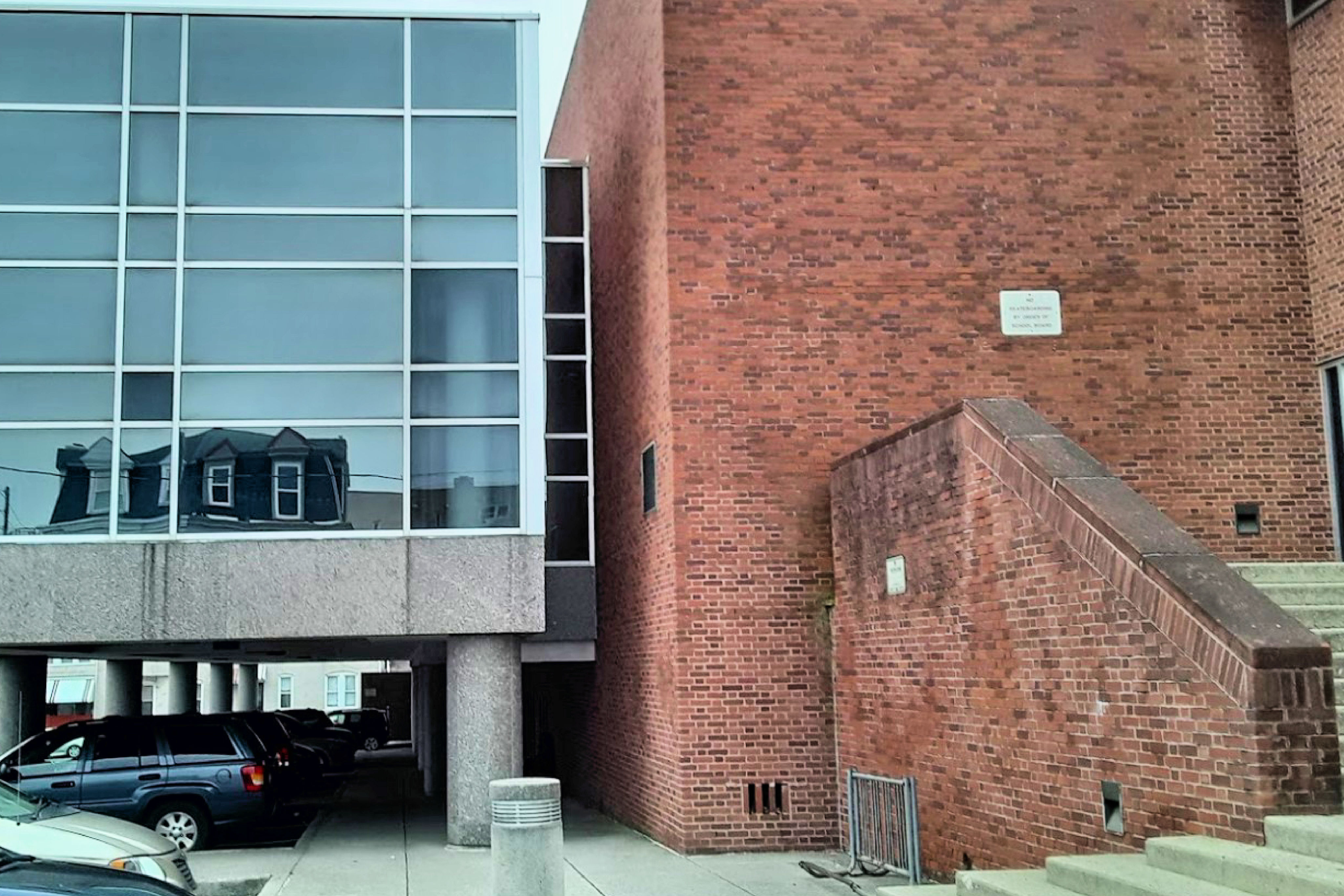
Allentown Public Library in 2020

In January 1976, the campaign for raising money received $500,000 from the Harry C. Trexler Foundation, and a combined $250,000 from the Call-Chronicle Newspapers and Donald P. Miller, its publisher. Director Kathryn Stephanoff explained why the library needed a new facility, saying, "Our basement is stacked from the floor to ceiling and the material is inaccessible to the public. There is also a pressing need for space for people since we have only one chair for every 3,000 people here in Allentown." Harry Snelling, who served on the campaign committee, added that the Allentown Public Library needed a larger building in order to maintain its status as a district library and continue to receive state funding: "Our present library does not meet federal and state standards for a district library and we don't measure up."

The same month, The Morning Call published an opinion piece reiterating these issues with the building on 914 Hamilton Street, which partly read, "Reading space is limited, stacks are uncomfortably close together, books are sometimes tucked into spare corners or along walls between the stacks…in some instances, space limitations have forced the library into giving part of special collections into the care of others, the school district, for example." Henry Moggio was re-elected president of the library board later that January. Moggio appointed Neal Shoemaker as treasurer, to help with the 1976 budget. The library board awarded a contract to Baddick and Laskowski, of Tamaqua, for test boring at the site for the new library.

To save money, the school district considered exchanging their existing lease on a "27-acre tract at the end of Mack Boulevard and adjacent to the South Mountain Reservoir," for the city's current lease on land at 12th and Hamilton streets. This reciprocal exchange of leases meant that the school district could lease the land for the new library instead of buying it, thereby saving the school district $300,000. The school district had originally acquired the South Mountain tract in the 1960s, when they wanted more space for a projected increase in school enrollment. If the city of Allentown allowed the school district to lease the land on Hamilton Street for the library, then the city would be able to use the South Mountain tract for "conservation and recreation," preserving the land from further development. Mayor Frank Daddona called the tract a "beautiful, naturally wooded area." The city council authorized Mayor Daddona to transfer the parcel of land at 12th and Hamilton streets to the Allentown School District, on April 7, 1976. The following evening, the Allentown School Board leased the South Mountain tract to the City of Allentown.

Air Products & Chemicals donated $200,000 to the library campaign, and Lehigh Structural Steel Company donated $35,000. The library fund campaign announced a communitywide drive for funding in May, setting its goal at $500,000. The library board planned to advertise in June for bids to construct the new library. The Breslin Ridyard Fadero architectural firm assisted the board in fielding the different bids. Ray B. Bracy Construction, Inc., of Allentown, gave a base bid of $1,857,000. Other companies submitted bids for heating, ventilation and air conditioning, plumbing, energy, and sprinklers.

A groundbreaking ceremony was held on February 1, 1977, at 12th and Hamilton. Excavation at the library site fell behind schedule when "very dense rock was encountered." The excavation required the use of blasting, and the blasting left holes that required extra cement to fill in.

=== 1978 opening ===
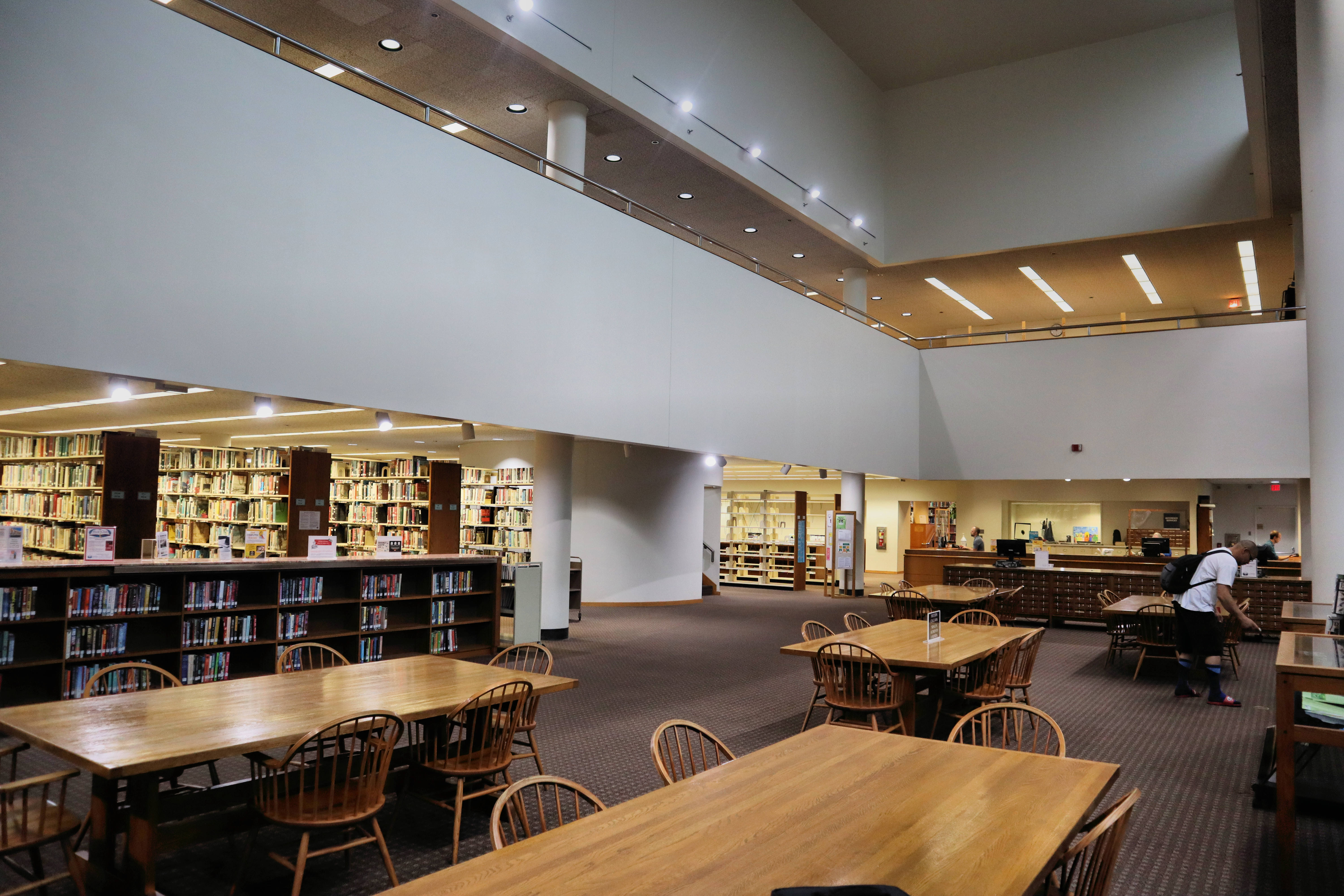
The interior of Allentown Library in 2022

The new library building at 12th and Hamilton streets opened on July 19, 1978. The library was designed and planned by Edward Fadero, Robert Breslin, and John Ridyard. Ray Bracy Construction Inc., overseen by Christopher Bracy, managed the construction. The total cost "including acquisition, construction and equipment fees is $3,688,805.06." Staff member Ethel Kistler stated that library had 210,000 books. The collection included books for the visually impaired (including Playboy in braille) furnished by the Allentown Lions Club, 16 mm films, and a Local History Room furnished by the Allentown Rotary Club. The library had its dedication ceremony at 4 p.m. on September 24, 1978.

== Branch Libraries ==
Allentown Public Library previously had three different branches in various locations in Allentown.

=== Northeast Branch (1928–1971) ===
In January 1928, the Northeast Branch of Allentown Public Library opened on 412 Washington Street, in the western corner of the Stravino apartment building. The library contained 1300 volumes, and Jenny Israel was the librarian in charge of the branch. By the end of February the Northeast Branch was considered a success, with the closing month determined to be "the biggest February the Allentown Free Library has had since its opening," in terms of volume circulation.

The Northeast Branch was later moved to 747 N. 7th Street.

In 1944, the Northeast Branch moved again, this time to 434 Washington Street. The library board authorized the installation of a telephone in the Northeast Branch that year, "in order to afford better service for its patrons." Jenny Israel resigned in May 1944, due to ill health. The library assistant Miss Doris Sohland took her place as chief librarian, and Mrs. Ellen Carlier continued her assistant work at the Northeast Branch as well.

In 1962, The Morning Call published an article that classified the Northeast Branch as a "minor distributing agency" rather than a functioning branch. The article quoted the State Library of Pennsylvania as stating that "a branch library should consist of a minimum of one full-time person for every 3,400 people served, the book collection should number at least 6,000 volumes and should be augmented by 500 books a year, and a daily schedule of operating hours should be adhered to." According to the article, the Libraries for Lehigh County Committee proposed that the Northeast Branch be enlarged and another branch be added: "Books would be interchangeable and book listings would be duplicated. Daily inter-branch delivery service would make any book available quickly to any borrower within the system." In 1966 the branch manager, Janet S. Minich, resigned.

In 1971, the library board announced that the Northeast Branch would close, and a new branch at Irving and Cedar streets would replace it. In spite of the new branch opening, the board received a petition with 1,000 names on it, requesting that the Northeast Branch remain open as well. At a meeting in the end of November 1971, the library board stood by its decision to close the Northeast Branch and open the East Branch the following year. Board chairman Henry Moggio stated that they could not justify taxing the city to keep both branches open simultaneously. Kathryn Stephanoff brought up issue that patrons had with the Northeast Branch: "its small size, heating, lack of air-conditioning, and other physical problems." Another board member, Richard Snyder, said that the new East Branch would "provide better services."

=== East Branch (1972–1994) ===
In February 1972, the East Branch of the Allentown Public Library opened at 835 Irving Street. It cost $190,000 and started with a collection of 22,000 books. Mrs. Paul King was the branch librarian. 520 people registered at the East Branch within its first three weeks of inception. Mrs. Robert A. Weinert, president of the Lehigh County Council of Republican Women, donated five volumes to the Mamie Eisenhower Library Project at the East Branch. This project honored the wife of President Dwight D. Eisenhower.

In 1980, the school board for Allentown School District considered taking over the Irving Street location and using it as a school facility. For this reason, in 1981, the library was scheduled to move the East Branch to the Midway Manor school building. Library staff and volunteers moved some 40,000 items into the new location in early March 1982. The new East Branch Library, "in a newly renovated wing of Midway Manor Elementary School at Tacoma and Pennsylvania streets," officially opened in the second week of March in 1982.

In May 1991, the Allentown Public Library relocated the East Branch again, this time to Pathmark Shopping Center at Maxwell and Hanover streets. The Midway Manor Location, which the school district needed for students, closed as a library on May 18. The new Pathmark location was expected to be more accessible and to have more parking spaces than the Midway Manor location. The East Branch officially reopened, at 1302 Hanover Ave., on Monday, July 8, 1991.

In April 1994, Kathryn Stephanoff announced that the library would not renew the three-year lease on the Pathmark location, due to declining circulation. The East Branch closed in June of that year.

=== South Branch (1965–2009) ===
In February 1965, director John McAvin announced plans for a South Side Branch in the Mountainville Shopping Center. State funding was secured for the branch, though a delay in the funding meant a delay in the opening of the library. The library board decided on a storeroom in the Mountainville Shopping Center for the location of the new branch, now identified as the "South Branch," in July. The board leased the storeroom and began ordering books and furniture.

The opening of the South Branch, originally set for November, was postponed after a delay in shelving and furniture delivery. Employees of the library began moving books to the South Branch on December 13, 1965. The South Branch was opened for business on January 11, 1966. It contained 4,000 children's books and 3,800 adult books.

In 1973, Allentown City Council proposed that the South Branch be moved to 601 W. Emmaus Ave., the location of the former Mountainville Pharmacy building. The current location in the Mountainville Shopping Center, they said, was "too small and no longer wanted in view of an increase in rent." The council proposed that the city of Allentown purchase the former pharmacy building and lease it cheaply to the school district. The South Branch at the Mountainville Shopping Center closed in October 1973. The new South Branch, at 601 Emmaus Ave., opened on November 1, 1973.

In August 2009, the South Branch closed due to budget problems.

== In popular culture ==
The 2005 film Rounding First contains a scene that was filmed in the Allentown Public Library, when the three boys need to look up an address in Philadelphia.
