= 1890 United States census =

11th US national census

- June 2, 1890
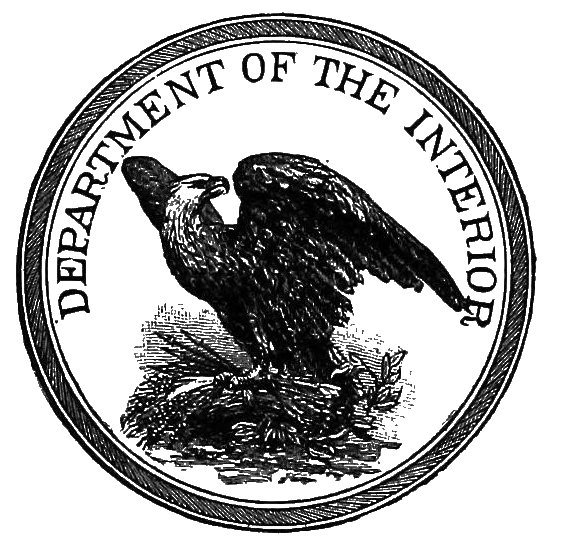
- Seal of the Department of the Interior

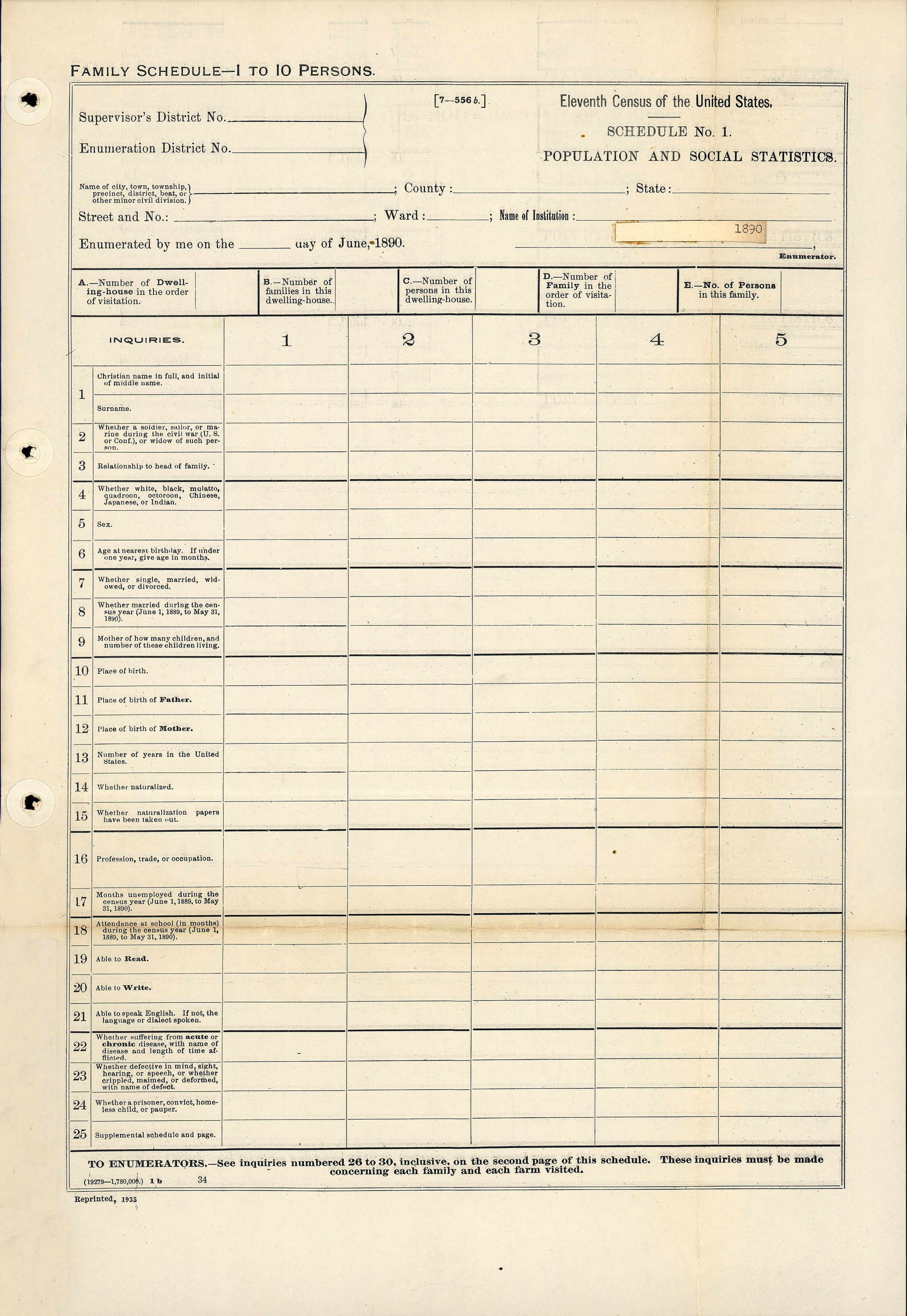
- 1890 census form

General information
- Country: United States
- Authority: Census Office

Results
- Total population: 62,979,766 (▲25.5%)
- Most populous state: New York; 6,003,174
- Least populous state: Nevada; 47,335

The 1890 United States census was taken beginning June 2, 1890. The census determined the resident population of the United States to be 62,979,766, an increase of 25.5 percent over the 50,189,209 persons enumerated during the 1880 census. The data reported that the distribution of the population had resulted in the disappearance of the American frontier.

This was the first census in which a majority of states recorded populations of over one million and the first in which three cities, New York City, Chicago, and Philadelphia, recorded populations of over one million. The census also saw Chicago rise in rank to the nation's second-most populous city, a position it would hold until Los Angeles, the 57th-most populous city as of 1890, supplanted it in 1990. This was the first U.S. census to use machines to tabulate the collected data.

Most of the 1890 census materials were destroyed on January 10, 1921, when the Commerce Department building caught fire, and in the subsequent disposal of the remaining damaged records.

== Census questions ==
The 1890 census collected the following information:

- address
- number of families in house
- number of persons in house
- names
- whether a soldier, sailor or Marine (Union or Confederate) during the American Civil War, or a widow of such person
- relationship to head of family
- race, described as white, black, mulatto, quadroon, octoroon, Chinese, Japanese, or Indian
- sex
- age
- marital status
- married within the year
- mother of how many children, and number now living
- place of birth of person, and their father and mother
- if foreign-born, number of years in U.S.
- whether naturalized
- whether naturalization papers have been taken out
- profession, trade or occupation
- months unemployed during census year
- ability to read and write
- ability to speak English, and, if unable, language or dialect spoken
- whether suffering from acute or chronic disease, with name of disease and length of time afflicted
- whether defective in mind, sight, hearing or speech, or whether crippled, maimed or deformed, with name of defect
- whether a prisoner, convict, homeless child, or pauper
- home rented, or owned by head or member of family, and, if owned, whether free from mortgage
- if farmer, whether farm is rented, or owned by head or member of family; if owned, whether free from mortgage; if rented, post office box of owner

== Methodology ==
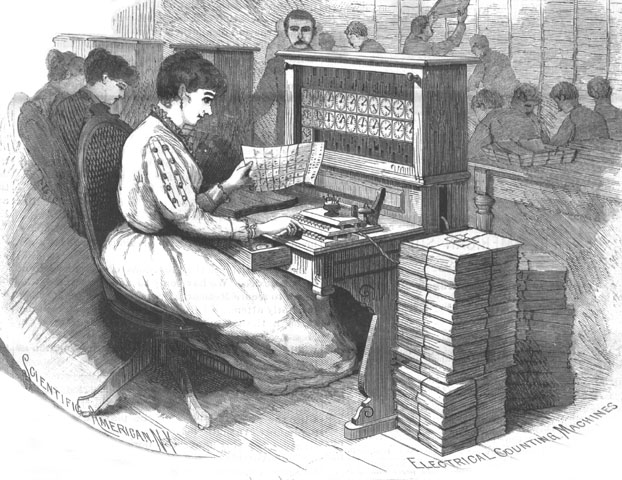
A Hollerith tabulator that has been modified for the first 1890 census tabulation; the punched-card reader was removed, replaced by a simple keyboard.

The 1890 census was the first to be compiled using methods invented by Herman Hollerith and was overseen by Superintendents Robert P. Porter (1889–1893) and Carroll D. Wright (1893–1897). Data was entered on a machine readable medium (punched cards) and tabulated by machine. Changes from the 1880 census included the larger population, the number of data items to be collected from individuals, the Census Bureau headcount, the volume of scheduled publications, and the use of Hollerith's electromechanical tabulators. The net effect of these changes was to reduce the time required to process the census from eight years for the 1880 census to six years for the 1890 census. The total population of 62,947,714, the family, or rough, count, was announced after only six weeks of processing (punched cards were not used for this tabulation). The public reaction to this tabulation was disbelief, as it was widely believed that the "right answer" was at least 75,000,000.

== Significant findings ==
The United States census of 1890 showed a total of 248,253 Native Americans living in the United States, down from 400,764 Native Americans identified in the census of 1850.

The 1890 census announced that the frontier region of the United States no longer existed, and that the Census Bureau would no longer track the westward migration of the U.S. population. In practice, however, said migration can still be tracked by plotting each succeeding census' mean center of United States population.

By 1890, settlement in the American West had reached sufficient population density that the frontier line had disappeared. For the 1890 census, the Census Bureau released a bulletin declaring the closing of the frontier, stating: "Up to and including 1880 the country had a frontier of settlement, but at present the unsettled area has been so broken into by isolated bodies of settlement that there can hardly be said to be a frontier line. In the discussion of its extent, its westward movement, etc., it can not, therefore, any longer have a place in the census reports."

Statisticians at the time argued that the results of the 1890 census was most likely an undercount of the total population in the United States from anywhere between one million to several millions, and that African Americans, working-class people, and young children were most likely to be undercounted.

== Data availability ==
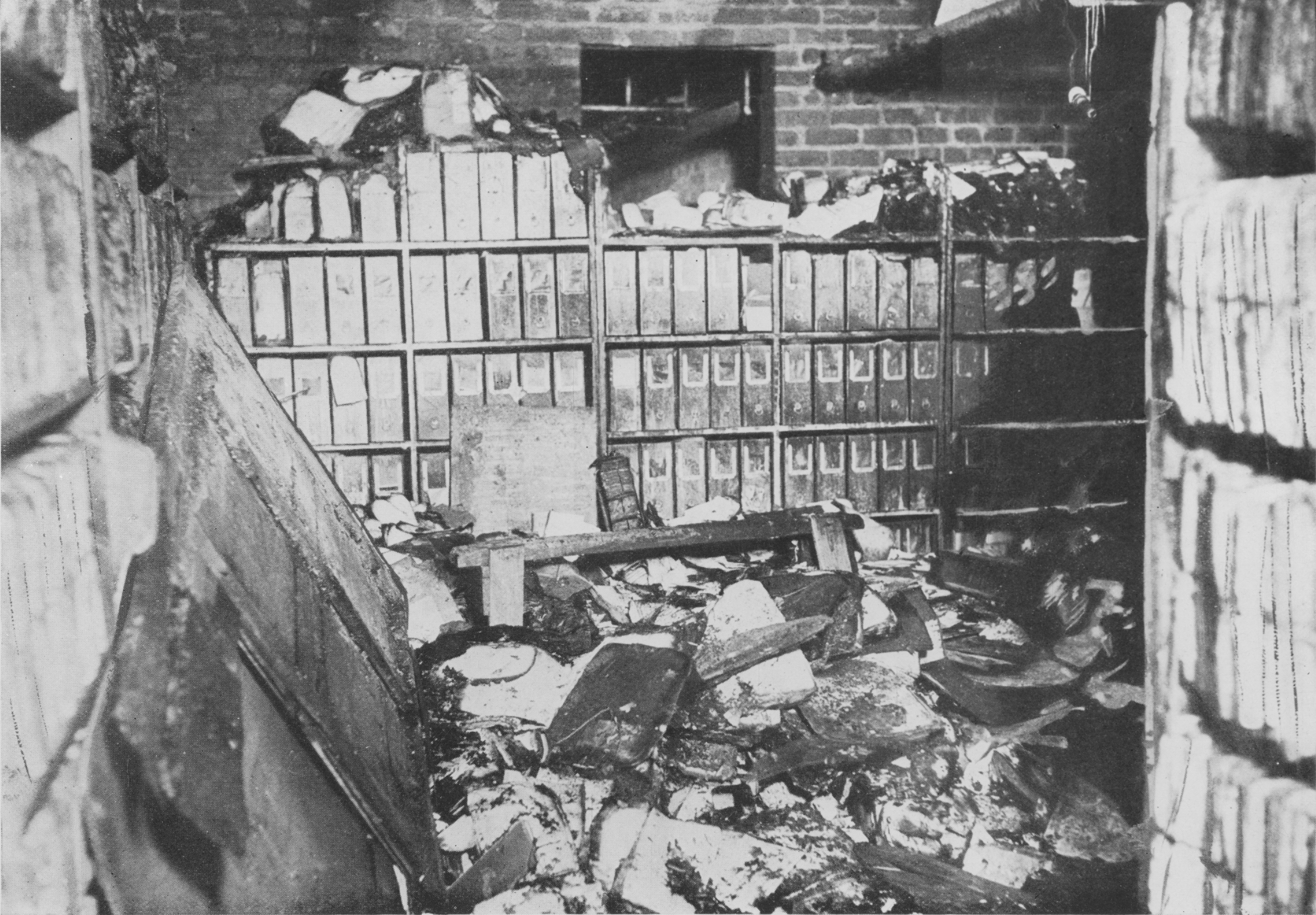
Aftermath of the 1921 fire which destroyed almost the entirety of the 1890 census records

The original data for the 1890 census is mostly unavailable. The population schedules were damaged in a fire in the basement of the U.S. Department of Commerce building in Washington, D.C. in 1921. Some 25% of the materials were presumed destroyed and another 50% damaged by smoke and water, although the actual damage may have been closer to 15–25%. The damage to the records led to an outcry for a permanent National Archives. In December 1932, following standard federal record-keeping procedures, the Chief Clerk of the Bureau of the Census sent the Librarian of Congress a list of papers to be destroyed, including the original 1890 census schedules. The Librarian was asked by the Bureau to identify any records which should be retained for historical purposes, but the Librarian did not accept the census records. Congress authorized destruction of that list of records on February 21, 1933, and the surviving original 1890 census records were destroyed by government order by 1934 or 1935. Few sets of microdata from the 1890 census survive. Aggregate data for small areas, together with compatible cartographic boundary files, can be downloaded from the National Historical Geographic Information System.

A directory of the 1890 US Census results for Northampton County, Pennsylvania (explicitly listing all of its 1890 inhabitants along with their names, professions, and ages) published by Joseph H. Werner in 1891 has survived up to the present day. (Note: One can find the full text copy of the 1890 US Census Directory for Northampton County at the Marx Room (see Henry F. Marx Local History Room for access) at the Easton Area Public Library.) This directory's existence has further solidified the evidence in favor of all-time validated American longevity recordholder Sarah Knauss's (1880-1999) age of 119 years, 97 days at the time of her death, for she is listed as a 10-year-old child (her 10th birthday wasn't until September 1890, several months after the official date of the 1890 US Census, but the 1890 census enumerator instructions explicitly said to round people's ages upwards) together with her family in this directory (they all lived in Northampton County, Pennsylvania back in 1890, specifically in South Bethlehem, Pennsylvania).

== State rankings ==
Rank	State	Population
01	New York	6,003,174
02	Pennsylvania	5,258,113
03	Illinois	3,826,352
04	Ohio	3,672,329
05	Missouri	2,679,185
06	Massachusetts	2,238,947
07	Texas	2,235,527
08	Indiana	2,192,404
09	Michigan	2,093,890
10	Iowa	1,912,297
11	Kentucky	1,858,635
12	Georgia	1,837,353
13	Tennessee	1,767,518
14	Wisconsin	1,693,330
15	Virginia	1,655,980
16	North Carolina	1,617,949
17	Alabama	1,513,401
18	New Jersey	1,444,933
19	Kansas	1,428,108
20	Minnesota	1,310,283
21	Mississippi	1,289,600
22	California	1,213,398
23	South Carolina	1,151,149
24	Arkansas	1,128,211
25	Louisiana	1,118,588
26	Nebraska	1,062,656
27	Maryland	1,042,390
28	West Virginia	762,794
29	Connecticut	746,258
30	Maine	661,086
31	Colorado	413,249
32	Florida	391,422
33	New Hampshire	376,530
34	Washington	357,232
35	South Dakota	348,600
36	Rhode Island	345,506
37	Vermont	332,422
38	Oregon	317,704
X	Oklahoma	258,657
X	District of Columbia	230,392
X	Utah	210,779
39	North Dakota	190,983
40	Delaware	168,493
X	New Mexico	160,282
41	Montana	142,924
42	Idaho	88,548
X	Arizona	88,243
43	Wyoming	62,555
44	Nevada	47,355
X	Alaska	32,052

== City rankings ==
Rank	City	State	Population	Region (2016)
01	New York	New York	1,515,301	Northeast
02	Chicago	Illinois	1,099,850	Midwest
03	Philadelphia	Pennsylvania	1,046,964	Northeast
04	Brooklyn	New York	806,343	Northeast
05	St. Louis	Missouri	451,770	Midwest
06	Boston	Massachusetts	448,477	Northeast
07	Baltimore	Maryland	434,439	South
08	San Francisco	California	298,997	West
09	Cincinnati	Ohio	296,908	Midwest
10	Cleveland	Ohio	261,353	Midwest
11	Buffalo	New York	255,664	Northeast
12	New Orleans	Louisiana	242,039	South
13	Pittsburgh	Pennsylvania	238,617	Northeast
14	Washington	District of Columbia	230,392	South
15	Detroit	Michigan	205,876	Midwest
16	Milwaukee	Wisconsin	204,468	Midwest
17	Newark	New Jersey	181,830	Northeast
18	Minneapolis	Minnesota	164,738	Midwest
19	Jersey City	New Jersey	163,003	Northeast
20	Louisville	Kentucky	161,129	South
21	Omaha	Nebraska	140,452	Midwest
22	Rochester	New York	133,896	Northeast
23	Saint Paul	Minnesota	133,156	Midwest
24	Kansas City	Missouri	132,716	Midwest
25	Providence	Rhode Island	132,146	Northeast
26	Denver	Colorado	106,713	West
27	Indianapolis	Indiana	105,436	Midwest
28	Allegheny	Pennsylvania	105,287	Northeast
29	Albany	New York	94,923	Northeast
30	Columbus	Ohio	88,150	Midwest
31	Syracuse	New York	88,143	Northeast
32	New Haven	Connecticut	86,045	Northeast
33	Worcester	Massachusetts	84,655	Northeast
34	Toledo	Ohio	81,434	Midwest
35	Richmond	Virginia	81,388	South
36	Paterson	New Jersey	78,347	Northeast
37	Lowell	Massachusetts	77,696	Northeast
38	Nashville	Tennessee	76,168	South
39	Scranton	Pennsylvania	75,215	Northeast
40	Fall River	Massachusetts	74,398	Northeast
41	Cambridge	Massachusetts	70,028	Northeast
42	Atlanta	Georgia	65,533	South
43	Memphis	Tennessee	64,495	South
44	Wilmington	Delaware	61,431	South
45	Dayton	Ohio	61,220	Midwest
46	Troy	New York	60,956	Northeast
47	Grand Rapids	Michigan	60,278	Midwest
48	Reading	Pennsylvania	58,661	Northeast
49	Camden	New Jersey	58,313	Northeast
50	Trenton	New Jersey	57,458	Northeast
51	Lynn	Massachusetts	55,727	Northeast
52	Lincoln	Nebraska	55,154	Midwest
53	Charleston	South Carolina	54,955	South
54	Hartford	Connecticut	53,230	Northeast
55	St. Joseph	Missouri	52,324	Midwest
56	Evansville	Indiana	50,756	Midwest
57	Los Angeles	California	50,395	West
58	Des Moines	Iowa	50,093	Midwest
59	Bridgeport	Connecticut	48,866	Northeast
60	Oakland	California	48,682	West
61	Portland	Oregon	46,385	West
62	Saginaw	Michigan	46,322	Midwest
63	Salt Lake City	Utah	44,843	West
64	Lawrence	Massachusetts	44,654	Northeast
65	Springfield	Massachusetts	44,179	Northeast
66	Manchester	New Hampshire	44,126	Northeast
67	Utica	New York	44,007	Northeast
68	Hoboken	New Jersey	43,648	Northeast
69	Savannah	Georgia	43,189	South
70	Seattle	Washington	42,837	West
71	Peoria	Illinois	41,024	Midwest
72	New Bedford	Massachusetts	40,733	Northeast
73	Erie	Pennsylvania	40,634	Northeast
74	Somerville	Massachusetts	40,152	Northeast
75	Harrisburg	Pennsylvania	39,385	Northeast
76	Kansas City	Kansas	38,316	Midwest
77	Dallas	Texas	38,067	South
78	Sioux City	Iowa	37,806	Midwest
79	Elizabeth	New Jersey	37,764	Northeast
80	Wilkes-Barre	Pennsylvania	37,718	Northeast
81	San Antonio	Texas	37,673	South
82	Covington	Kentucky	37,371	South
83	Portland	Maine	36,425	Northeast
84	Tacoma	Washington	36,006	West
85	Holyoke	Massachusetts	35,637	Northeast
86	Fort Wayne	Indiana	35,393	Midwest
87	Binghamton	New York	35,005	Northeast
88	Norfolk	Virginia	34,871	South
89	Wheeling	West Virginia	34,522	South
90	Augusta	Georgia	33,300	South
91	Youngstown	Ohio	33,220	Midwest
92	Duluth	Minnesota	33,115	Midwest
93	Yonkers	New York	32,033	Northeast
94	Lancaster	Pennsylvania	32,011	Northeast
95	Springfield	Ohio	31,895	Midwest
96	Quincy	Illinois	31,494	Midwest
97	Mobile	Alabama	31,076	South
98	Topeka	Kansas	31,007	Midwest
99	Elmira	New York	30,893	Northeast
100	Salem	Massachusetts	30,801	Northeast
