= Lehigh Structural Steel Company =

Former Steel Manufacturer

Coordinates: 40°36′59″N 075°27′26″W

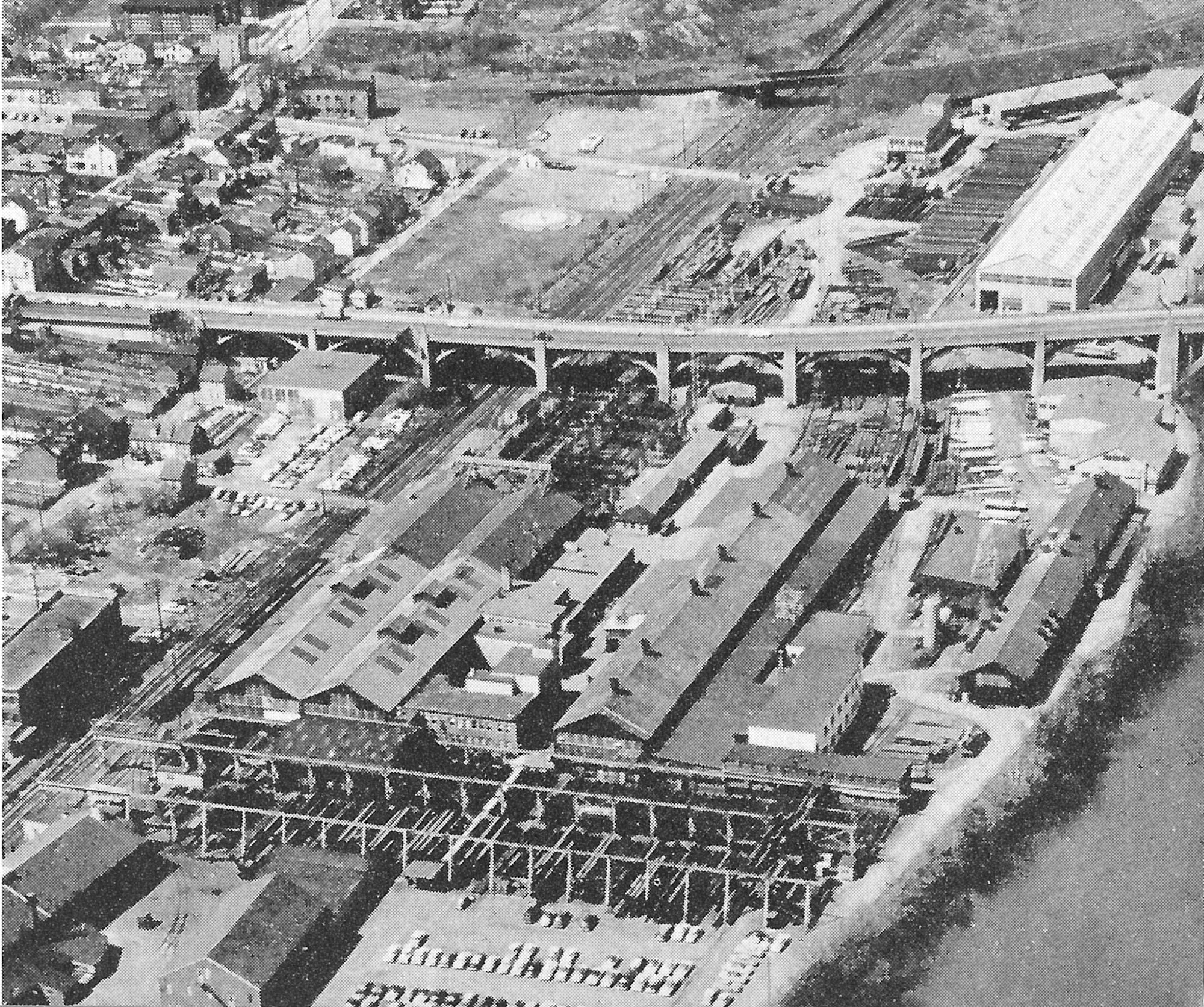
- An aerial view of Lehigh Structural Steel Company in 1959
- Company type: Private company
- Industry: Steel production and fabrication
- Founded: 1919
- Defunct: 1992
- Fate: Sold
- Successor: Thomas & Betts
- Headquarters: 1 Allen Street; Allentown, Pennsylvania, U.S.
- Products: steel
- Subsidiaries: Lehigh-Lancaster Inc. (Lancaster, South Carolina)

The Lehigh Structural Steel Company is a former steel manufacturing company located in Allentown, Pennsylvania. The company was sold in 1992 to Thomas & Betts, and its facilities were closed.

== History ==
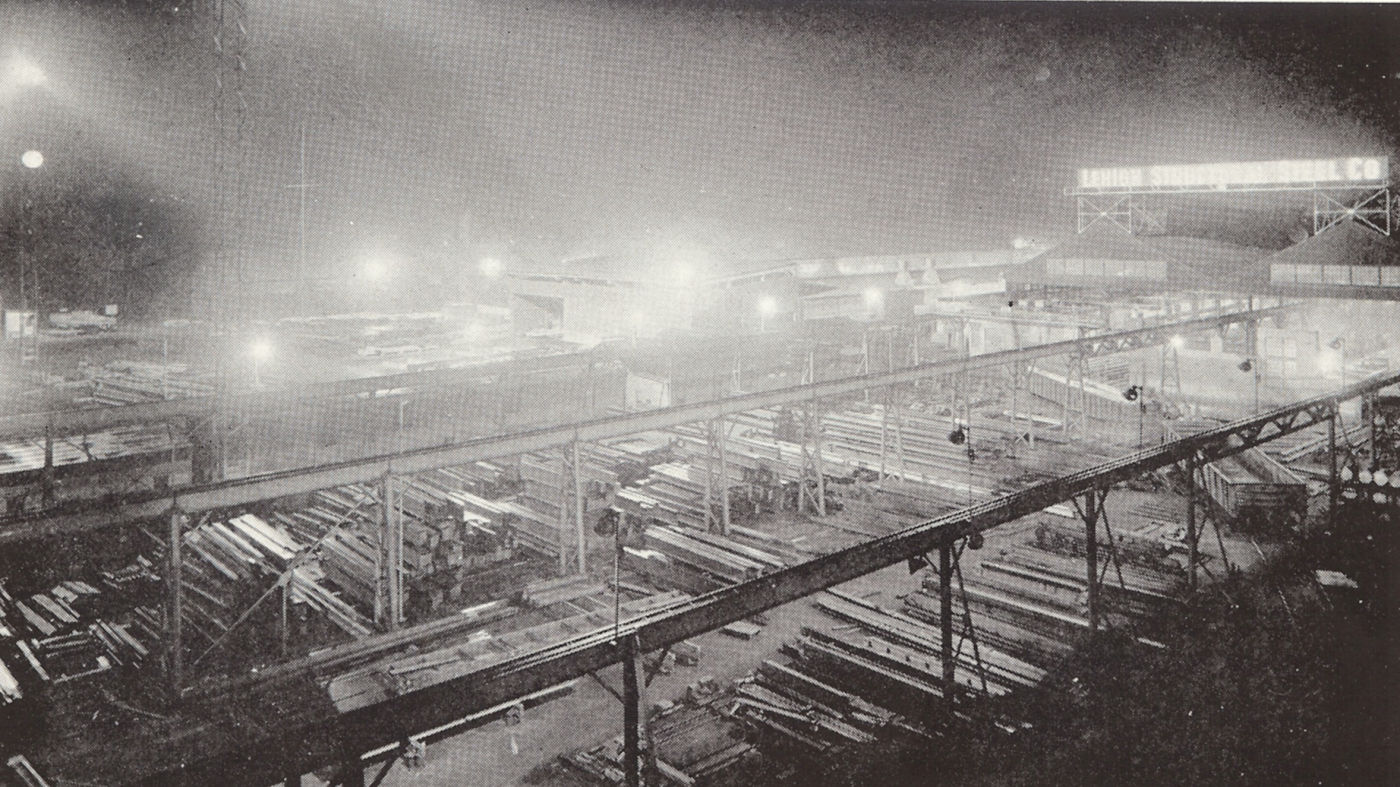
Lehigh Structural Steel Company at night in 1950

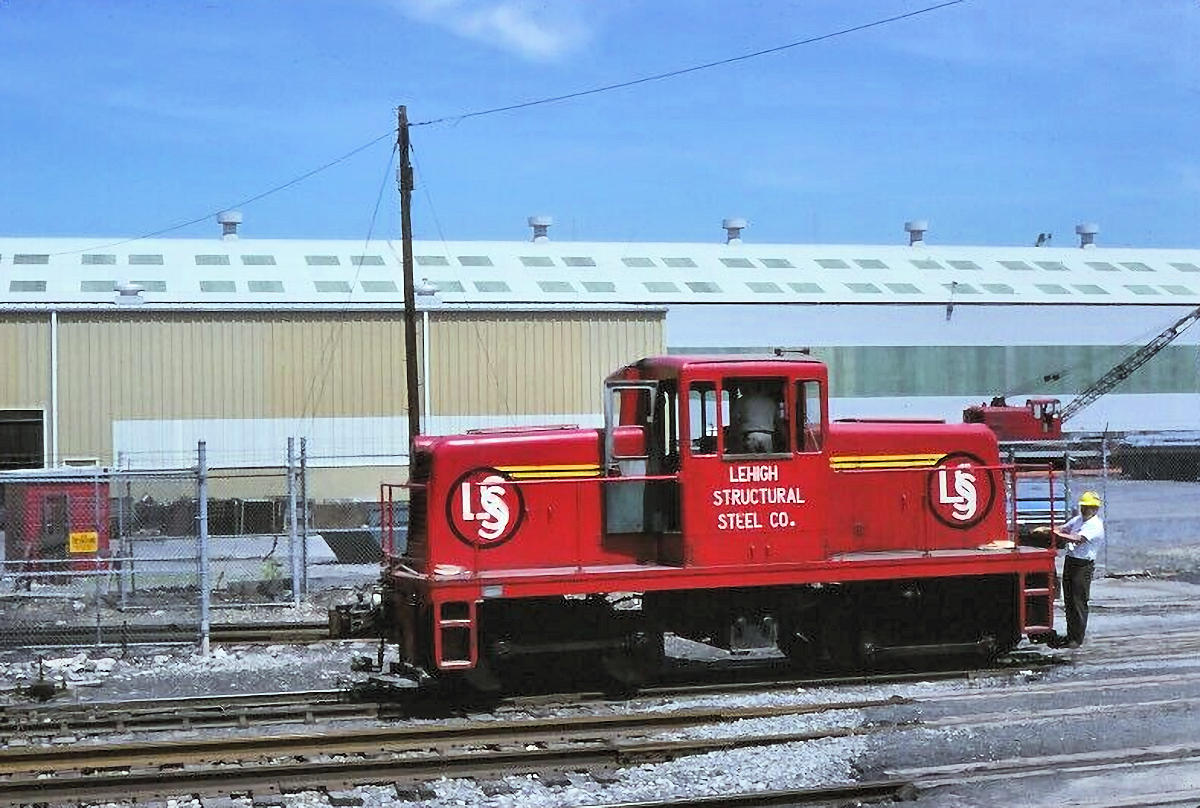
A train engine at Lehigh Structural Steel Company in 1968

The company was formed in 1919 by Thomas R. Mullen, William H. Mohr and Les Kift during the height of Allentown's industrial era. Its facilities occupied 55 acres along the Lehigh River, consisting of heavy fabrication buildings, tower fabrication and tower galvanizing. Lehigh Steel was the only major steel manufacturer located in Allentown.

Lehigh Steel received coal, iron ore and other requirements, and transported out its manufactured steel products via railroad links with the Lehigh Valley Railroad and the Central Railroad of New Jersey, both of which had spur lines that ran into the plant.

The company fabricated steel for everything from bridges and airplane hangars to high-rise office buildings. It fabricated large steel trusses and girders up to 150 feet long, weighing up to 75 tons. It also produced galvanized and chromium steel. It employed more than 500 workers in the 1960s and had annual sales of almost $90 million in the 1980s.

In 1967, the company expanded, purchasing Kaufman Fabricators of Texas and Wolko Engineering of Pottstown, Pennsylvania. It also constructed a second manufacturing plant, Lehigh-Lancaster Inc., in Lancaster, South Carolina.

In June 1973, Lehigh Steel began to have labor problems when a wildcat strike over incentive pay for welders temporarily halted production. The company also began facing stiff competition from lower-priced imported steel.

In early 1983, the Allentown plant closed and laid off 350 workers shortly after asking union workers to accept wage and benefits concessions. The union agreed to concessions several months later but the plant was closed for more than a year until it reopened in July 1984. Shortly afterwards, Lehigh Steel won a large contract to provide structural steel for two New York City office buildings that guaranteed work into February 1985. At that time, the company employed 260 people and had annual sales of almost $90 million. Its South Carolina plant won a contract to provide 1,100 tons of steel to Mack Trucks for the construction of its new plant in Winnsboro, South Carolina.

In the mid-1980s, pressure from foreign steel manufacturers led to a loss of orderss. Canadian steel manufacturers, in particular, were cited for dumping more than 120,000 tons of steel a year to the United States during the late 1980s. While the Canadian market share amounted to about five percent at the time, a majority of the Canadian imports were being dumped in the Northeastern United States, which was Lehigh Structural Steel's primary market.

In 1989, the company announced the decision to stop fabricating steel in Allentown, citing company losses of about $10 million in five years and the firm was no longer able to secure financing or bonding for future operations. The Lancaster plant, however, remained open.

The company sold its Allentown plant in June 1990 for $3 million to three local investors who renovated the property and began leasing out space to area companies. The number of employees was reduced in Allentown to a small group of twelve executives.

In June 1992, the Lancaster South Carolina plant was sold, and the last assets of Lehigh Steel were purchased by Thomas & Betts, an electrical equipment manufacturer based in Bridgewater Township, New Jersey on August 25, 1992.

=== The Waterfront ===
In 2012, the Waterfront Development Company announced plans to develop the 26-acre Lehigh Structural Steel site into a vibrant mixed-use development called The Waterfront. Twelve Class A buildings will introduce more than 1,250,000 square feet of office, residential, retail and restaurant space along the western banks of the Lehigh River. The development will also include a signature garden-lined River Walk, two outdoor plazas, on-site docks for direct access to the Lehigh River, and a restaurant and retail promenade.

The Waterfront is expected to introduce 2,800 new jobs, 750 new residents, and generate more than $4,200,000 annually in additional real estate taxes. The development is expected to take ten years for full build-out, with buildings opening as they are completed. The Waterfront is the first development

The Waterfront Development Company is headed by Mark and Zachary Jaindl. The father-son team, founders of Jaindl Enterprises, focus on historical redevelopment and adaptive reuse projects to promote smart urban growth and the prevention of urban sprawl.

== See also ==
- List of historic places in Allentown, Pennsylvania
