= Hollywood, Luzerne County, Pennsylvania =

Hollywood
- Unincorporated community
- Location within the state of Pennsylvania
- Coordinates: 40°59′41″N 75°59′44″W
- Country: United States
- State: Pennsylvania
- County: Luzerne
- Elevation: 1,598 ft (487 m)
- Time zone: UTC-5 (Eastern (EST))
  - Summer (DST): UTC-4 (EDT)

Hollywood was an unincorporated community and coal town which was ultimately incorporated into the boundaries of Hazleton, Pennsylvania, United States.

== Notable person ==
- Sarah Knauss (1880–1999), a supercentenarian who lived to be 119 years old. She died in Allentown.
