= Flag of Easton, Pennsylvania =

City of Easton
- Adopted: July 8, 1776; 250 years ago (according to legend)
- Design: A blue field with 13 alternating red and white stripes in the canton and 12 white 8-pointed stars circling another white 8-pointed star to the right of the design in the canton

The Easton flag is an early American flag used in modern times to represent Easton, Pennsylvania.

== Flag ==
The flag is designed differently from more common flags of the United States in that it has 13 (8-pointed) stars in a blue field, with 13 stripes in the canton. The flag's design is consistent with the 1777 Flag Act, which does not specify the location of the stars and stripes: "That the flag of the thirteen United States be thirteen stripes, alternate red and white; that the union be thirteen stars, white in a blue field, representing a new constellation."

== History ==
According to local legend, the flag was hoisted when the Declaration of Independence was publicly read in Easton, Pennsylvania by Robert Levers on July 8, 1776, two days before a copy of the Declaration reached New York City. Its history is closely connected to the local Beidleman family who worshiped at Pennsylvania German Reformed and Lutheran churches in Easton and the Straw Church near Phillipsburg, New Jersey. The Beidlemans were originally from Assenheim in the Rhineland-Palatinate.

The flag was used as a company flag under Captain Abraham Horn in the War of 1812, and some suspect that the design may only date from this era. It was presented to the infantry by Rosanna (Rosina) Beidleman Wagener (1775-1848) who married a local Schwenkfelder descendant prominent in Northampton County commerce and finance, and there is speculation that the now-uncommon arrangement of components of the design may have been because the Beidlemans did not use English and may have used German prepositions to understand proposals for an American flag.

The existence of the flag before the War of 1812 is considered unlikely by some, but flags of that period would have had 15 stars and stripes rather than the 13 of 1776 as present on the Flag of Easton. In 1821, the flag was given to the Easton Area Public Library, which has it on display.
