= Thomas & Betts =

American manufacturer

Thomas & Betts was a designer and manufacturer of connectors and components for electrical and communication markets. Thomas and Betts was founded in 1898 by two young engineers from Princeton University, Robert M. Thomas and Hobart D. Betts. They formed an agency for selling conduit to electrical distributors during a time when incandescent electric lighting was first introduced to New York City. Thomas & Betts is notable as the inventor of cable ties in 1958 to facilitate assembling wire harnesses in airplanes. It has recently expanded its product offerings through the acquisition of leading brands in the power protection industry specifically focused on critical infrastructure.

ABB acquired Thomas & Betts for $3.9 billion, or $72 a share, in 2012 to become a major player in the North American low-voltage products market.

Nortek purchased the Thomas & Betts HVAC business unit (Reznor) from ABB in March 2014 for $260 million.

In 2018, Thomas & Betts was renamed ABB Installation Products Ltd.
