= Easton Area Public Library =

Public library in Easton, Pennsylvania

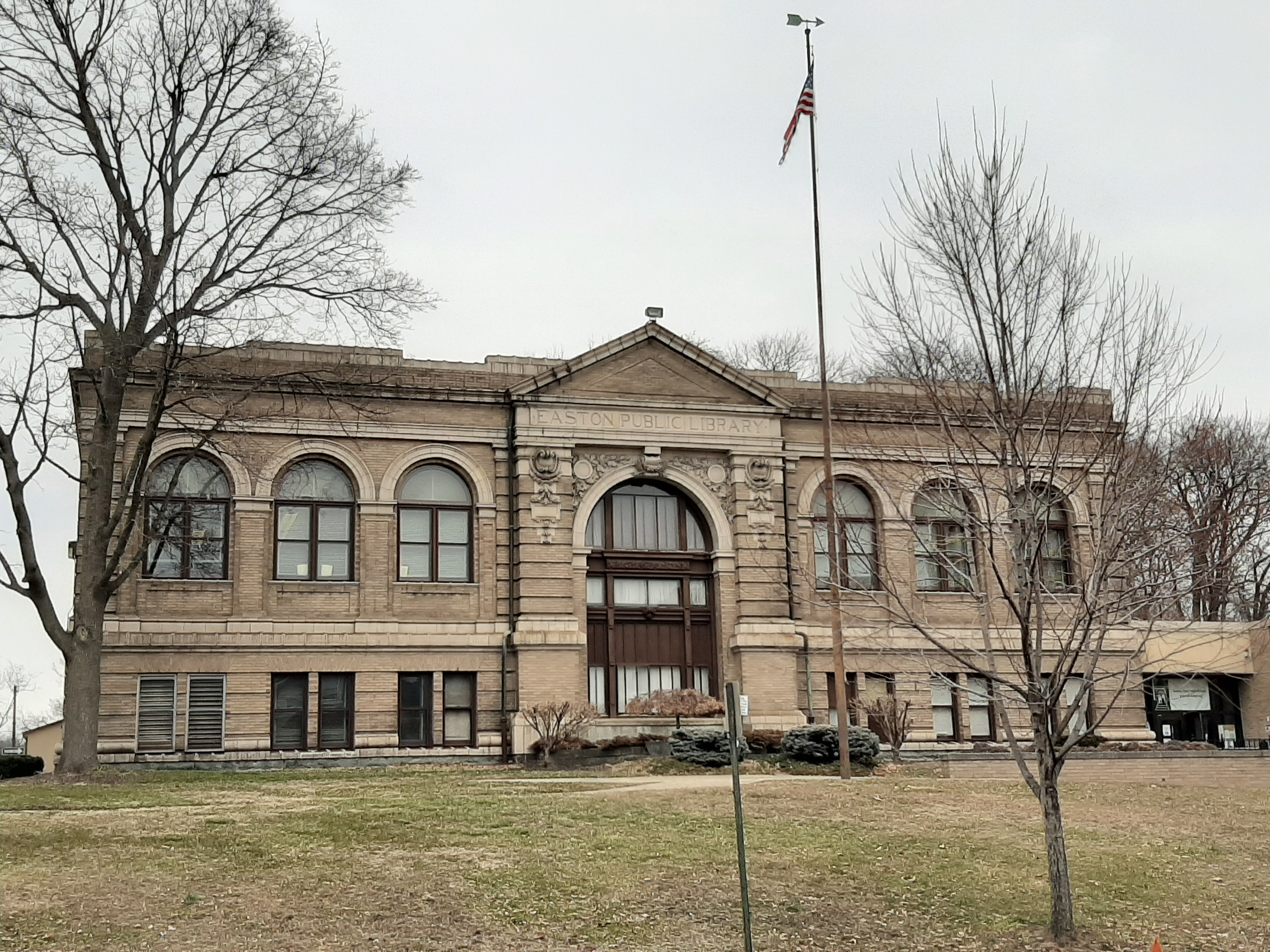
- Easton Area Public Library in Easton, Pennsylvania in January 2020
- 40°41′31″N 75°12′49″W
- Location: Easton, Pennsylvania, U.S.
- Established: 1811
- Branches: 2

Collection
- Size: 144,919 (2022)

Access and use
- Circulation: 176,711 (2022)
- Population served: 69,493 (2022)
- Members: 37,713 (2022)

Other information
- Budget: $2.64M (2022)
- Director: Jennifer Long
- Employees: 24
- Website: www.eastonpl.org

The Easton Area Public Library serves Easton, Pennsylvania in Northampton County, Pennsylvania. It is a Carnegie library and was predated by a community library constructed by the Easton Library Company in 1811. With a grant in 1901 for $57,000 by industrialist Andrew Carnegie a new library began construction at 515 Church Street and was completed in 1903.

The library system consists of the Main library serving as the headquarters and the Palmer Branch located at 1 Weller Place, Palmer Township which was constructed in 1986.

The main location in Easton, Pennsylvania includes the Marx Room, which was added in 1985 to serve as a local history room. This addition houses the largest collection of local history and genealogy in northeastern Pennsylvania with roughly 15,000 historical texts and materials about the Easton area and Northampton County.

The library holds the oldest known map of Easton, which dates back to the early 18th century, and the original Flag of Easton, which was hoisted during the first public reading of the Declaration of Independence in the Thirteen Colonies, which was read simultaneously in only three designated locations: Easton, Philadelphia, and Trenton, New Jersey, at noon on July 8, 1776, four days after its unanimous adoption by the Second Continental Congress.

== History ==
=== 19th century ===
The Easton Library Company was founded on January 16, 1811, when 100 shares of stock were offered to the public. The company was founded in order to provide books to the citizens of Easton, however only patrons who supported the library with a yearly subscription fee were allowed access to the collection. By 1815, the company had raised enough money to construct a building, known as Library Hall, on land donated by resident Samuel Sitgreaves. This location on the corner of North Second and Church Street was used for the next 90 years. During the Civil War, the subscription service suffered due to a high number of Easton citizens enlisting in the Union Army. To account for the decrease in library use, the Library Company deeded the building to the Easton School Board in 1864. When the school board took over operation of the library, high school students were permitted to borrow books without a subscription.

As the Easton Library Company restricted free library access to the general public, the women of Lehigh Valley founded the Easton Library Association in 1895, with the goal of establishing a free public library for those who could not afford an annual library subscription. Funding for the new library was financed by the school board and became open to all residents in the city, regardless of income.

On March 30, 1896, the Library Association opened their first library which was available for three hours every weekday afternoon from 2:00 pm to 5:00 pm including extra evening hours from 7:30 pm to 9:00 pm on Thursdays and Saturdays.

=== 20th century ===
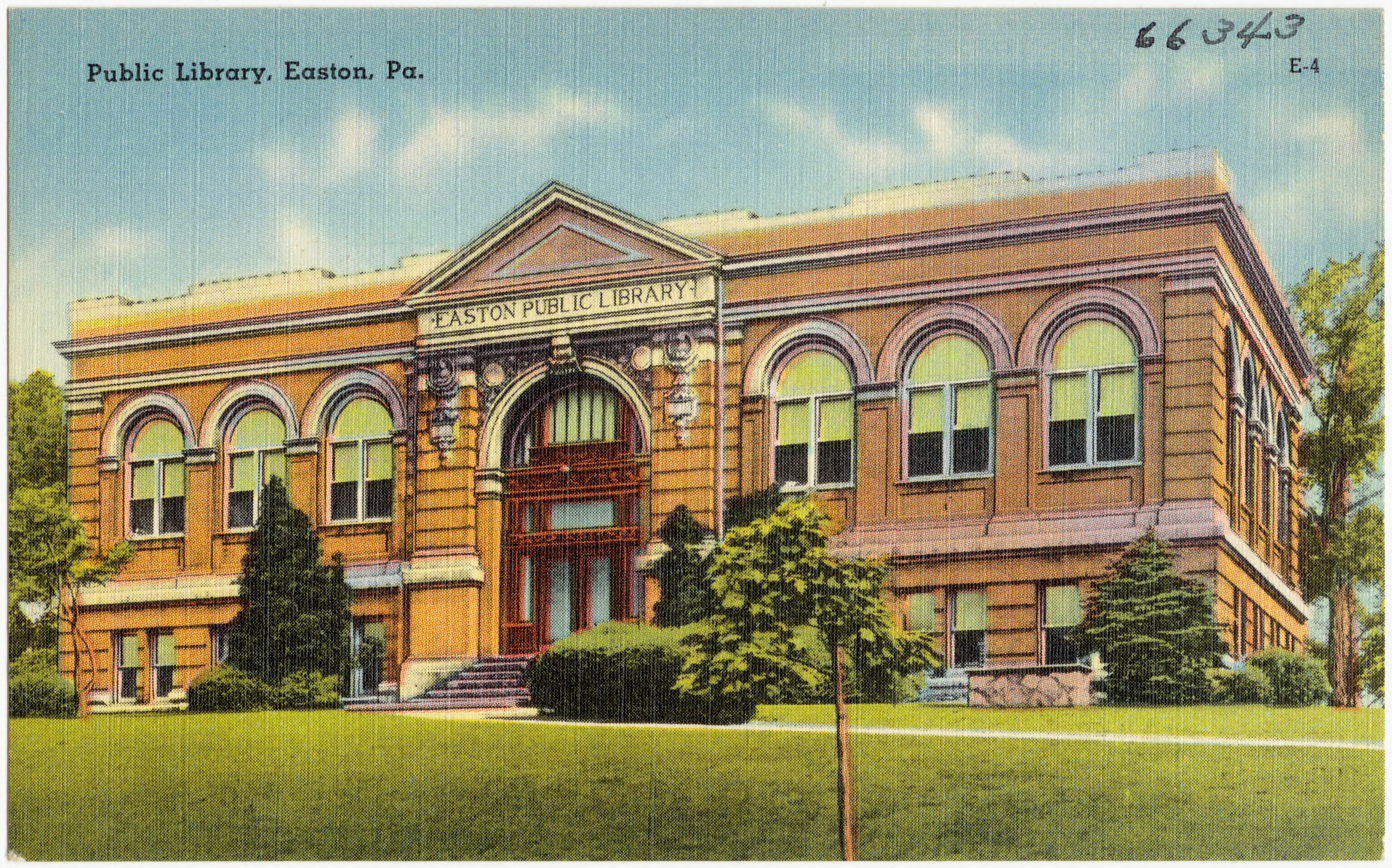
A postcard illustration of Easton Area Public Library drawn c. 1930–1945

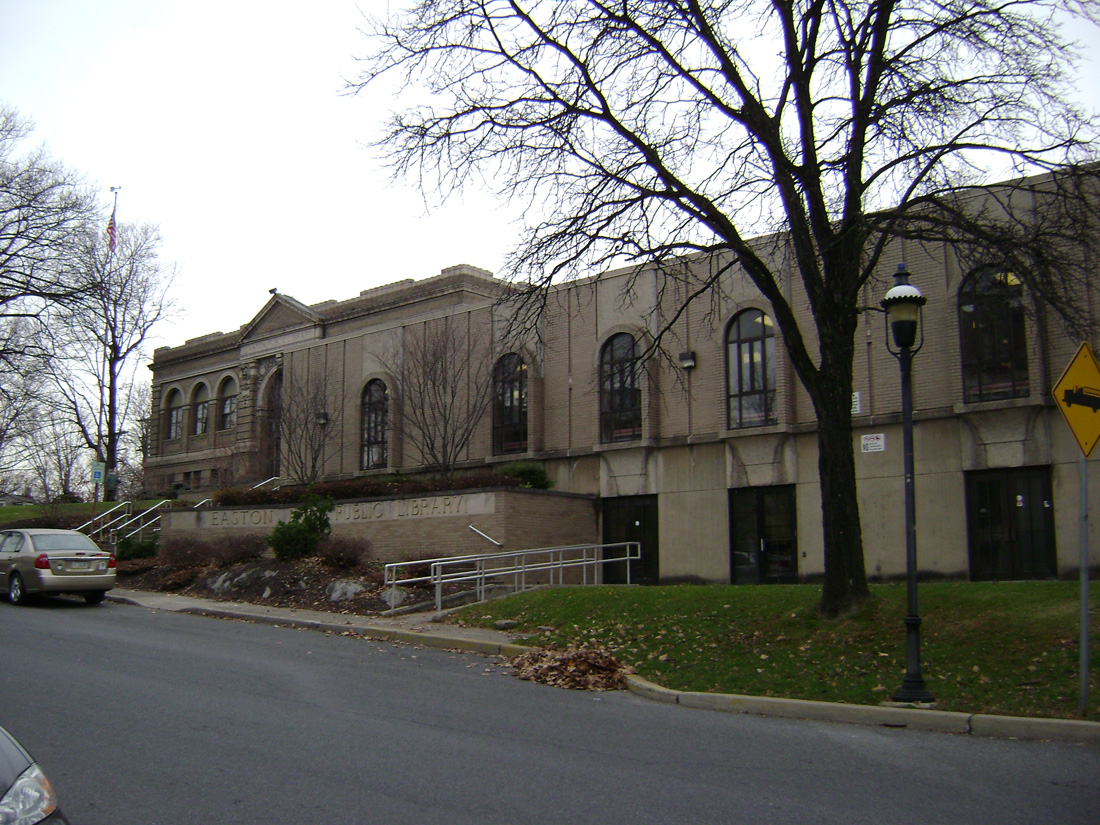
Easton Area Public Library in Easton, Pennsylvania in December 2009

In 1901, due to the library's high level of interest and increased number of visitors, the Easton Library Association and Easton Library Company combined their collections. Now as a singular free public library, this change made the city eligible to apply for a library grant from the state of Pennsylvania.

At the turn of the 20th century, industrialist Andrew Carnegie began funding dozens of public libraries in Pennsylvania. In 1901, the Carnegie Corporation received plans from the Easton Library Association asking for a donation for a new building to be constructed on Church Street. The committee sent plans for a two-story Modern Renaissance building, measuring 90 by 70 feet (27 by 21 m), on the best available piece of property in town, an old graveyard no longer in use. Included in the plans were a fireproof vault for the protection of books of rare and historic value, and an auditorium with a seating capacity of 400 to 500 people.

The final building proposal would be large enough to house 34,500 volumes. After reviewing the plans, Carnegie donated $50,000 (equivalent to $1.5 million in 2024 dollars), under the condition that the citizens of Easton provide land for the construction of the library, and allocate a $5,000 annual maintenance and upkeep fee (equivalent to $150,000 in 2024 dollars) through the city government. The city ultimately agreed to fund the daily expenses and construction began.

On October 28, 1903, the Carnegie library was completed and dedicated to the community as the Easton Public Library. At the time of opening the library contained 14,000 books and was served by librarian Henry F. Marx.

Due to rapid growth and great public interest the new library quickly found itself at full capacity and in need of additional space for a quickly growing book collection. In 1911, the Easton Library Association reached out to Carnegie again to petition for funding to add an addition to the main library and received a second grant for $10,500 (equivalent to $293,000 in 2024 dollars), to create additional storage space on the north side of the building. This renovation increased the capacity of the library to 80,000 volumes.

In 1941, the library underwent an additional renovation, which added lofted stacks to again increase the storage capacity for books.

In 1962, the Commonwealth of Pennsylvania passed legislation to create district library centers. These centers were prominent libraries chosen for their size and influence that could supplement library services and offer assistance to other smaller libraries operating in their regions while providing their own communities with access to a free public library.

By 1963, the Easton Area Public Library surpassed the minimum requirements to become designated as one of Pennsylvania's first district library centers, servicing Monroe and Northampton counties. Created by legislation in 1962, District Library Centers were designated libraries

In 1969, a further addition was made to the library, which added a large building to the east side to be used as additional floor space for offices, meeting areas, and book stacks.

In 1985, the Easton Library Association noticed their historic book collection was at risk of acidification and began a $300,000 (equivalent to $741,000 in 2024 dollars), campaign to renovate what was the bookmobile room into a climate controlled history room. To pay for the new room the Friends of the Library contacted the National Endowment for the Humanities and secured a $100,000 (equivalent to $567,000 in 2024 dollars), grant to assist in fundraising.

Due to its rich collection of books dating to the early 19th century and the library's historic role that dates back to the nation's founding, the National Endowment for the Humanities recognized Easton Area Public Library as "one of the most extensive research libraries in the East." The library was one of the few libraries across the country to secure a grant.

A renovation to the library, completed in 1987, included the building of the Marx Room, which is named after Easton Public Library first librarian, Henry F. Marx. The Marx Room holds many of Easton's most historic relics, including the oldest known map of the area dating back to the late 18th century, which was hand drawn by Charles de Krafft who surveyed the area for Thomas Penn, son of William Penn, founder of the colonial-era Province of Pennsylvania. The map outlines the original 1,000 acres (400 ha) of Easton which Thomas Penn received in 1736 in order to keep track of who was living on each plot of land, and as a resource for town lots to be rented out to farmers and other settlers moving to the region.

The Marx Room also holds what is widely considered the original Flag of Easton that was raised during one of the first public readings of the Declaration of Independence, which took place in Easton on July 8, 1776. The flag was also later given to Captain Abraham Horn's Company as they left to march tos Camp DuPont in Marcus Hook during the War of 1812. When the company returned at the end of the war, they presented the flag to the library for safekeeping, where it has since remained.

In 1986, Easton Area Public Library opened its second permanent branch, known as the Palmer Branch, located at 1 Weller Place on the opposite side of Easton. The Palmer Branch replaced a temporary service branch that had been run out of a trailer on Division Street. The plans for the new $400,000 (equivalent to $968,000 in 2024 dollars), library had been initiated in 1983, and money was raised by the township Business, Industrial and Professional Association Incorporated. The City of Easton additionally received $200,000 (equivalent to $528,000 in 2024 dollars), in funding from the federal library construction grant.

=== 21st century ===
In 2001, the Easton Library joined the neighboring Allentown Public Library, Bethlehem Public Library, and Moravian College Library at Moravian College to create the Lehigh Valley Library System. This consortium serves roughly 660,000 people in the Lehigh Valley.
