= Lists of centenarians =

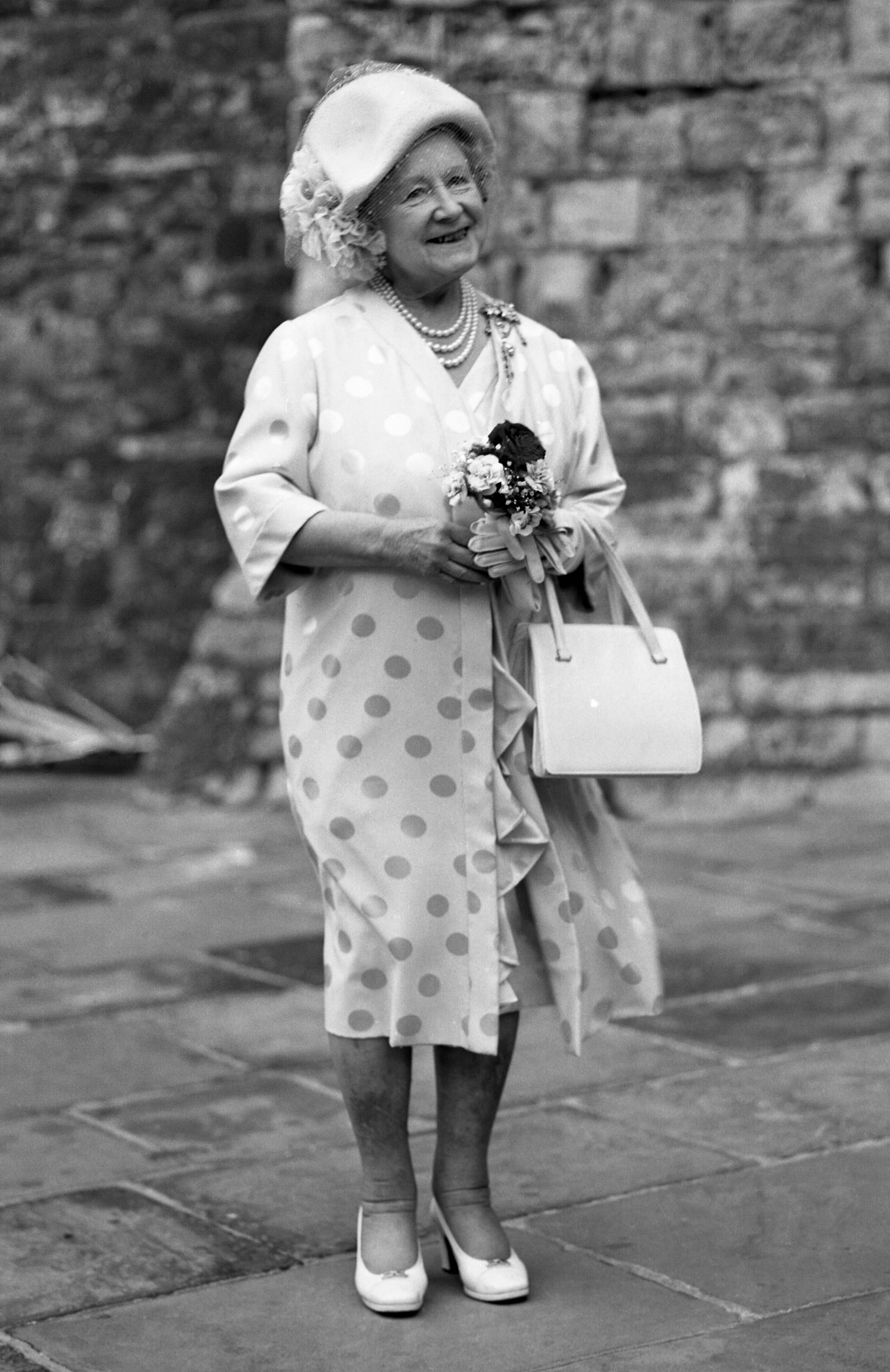
Queen Elizabeth the Queen Mother, pictured outside Dover Castle

The following is a list of lists of notable centenarians by categorized occupation (people who lived to be or are currently living at 100 years or more of age) that are known for reasons other than just longevity.

== Famous people by career ==
- List of centenarians (activists, nonprofit leaders and philanthropists)
- List of centenarians (actors, filmmakers and entertainers) (age 100–104)
  - List of semi-supercentenarians (actors, filmmakers and entertainers) (age 105–109)
- List of centenarians (artists, painters and sculptors)
- List of centenarians (authors, editors, poets and journalists)
- List of centenarians (businesspeople)
- List of centenarians (educators, school administrators, social scientists and linguists)
- List of centenarians (engineers, mathematicians and scientists)
- List of centenarians (explorers)
- List of centenarians (jurists and practitioners of law)
- List of centenarians (medical professionals)
- List of centenarians (military commanders and soldiers)
- List of centenarians (musicians, composers and music patrons)
- List of centenarians (philosophers and theologians)
- List of centenarians (politicians and civil servants)
- List of centenarians (religious figures)
- List of centenarians (royalty and nobility)
- List of centenarians (sportspeople)
  - List of centenarians (Major League Baseball players)
  - List of centenarians (National Football League players)
  - List of centenarian masters track and field athletes
  - List of centenarian masters track and field records
- List of centenarians (miscellaneous)

== Supercentenarians ==
The following is a list of lists of known supercentenarians (people who lived to be or are currently living at 110 years or more of age).

- List of supercentenarians
- List of supercentenarians (actors, filmmakers and entertainers)
- List of supercentenarians by continent
- List of American supercentenarians
- List of Argentine supercentenarians
- List of Belgian supercentenarians
- List of Brazilian supercentenarians
- List of British supercentenarians
- List of Canadian supercentenarians
- List of Colombian supercentenarians
- List of Danish supercentenarians
- List of Dutch supercentenarians
- List of Finnish supercentenarians
- List of French supercentenarians
- List of German supercentenarians
- List of Irish supercentenarians
- List of Italian supercentenarians
- List of Japanese supercentenarians
- List of Norwegian supercentenarians
- List of Portuguese supercentenarians
- List of Spanish supercentenarians
- List of Swedish supercentenarians
