= List of supercentenarians by continent =

People who have lived 110 years or longer

A supercentenarian (sometimes hyphenated as super-centenarian) is someone who has lived to or passed their 110th birthday. This age is achieved by about one in 1,000 centenarians. Anderson et al. concluded that supercentenarians live a life typically free of major age-related diseases until shortly before maximum human lifespan is reached (theoretically estimated to be 126 years).

== European supercentenarians ==
European supercentenarians are residents or emigrants from Europe who have attained or surpassed 110 years of age. By January 2015 the Gerontology Research Group (GRG) had validated the longevity claims of more than 600 European supercentenarians.

The oldest European and the world's oldest person ever recorded was Frenchwoman Jeanne Calment, who lived to the age of 122 years and 164 days. This has been disputed by some researchers. (Note: A November 2018 study by Nikolay Zak and Philip Gibbs advanced the hypothesis that Calment's daughter Yvonne usurped her identity upon her death in 1934 (but claimed it was Yvonne who died). Yvonne was born on 19 January 1898, which would have made her 99 years old upon her death in 1997. This suggestion has been rejected by the majority of credible longevity researchers.) The oldest European man ever was Christian Mortensen from Denmark, who emigrated to the United States where he died aged 115 years and 252 days. The oldest non-emigrant European man was Spaniard Joan Riudavets Moll, who lived 114 years and 81 days.

Beyond the 50 oldest Europeans in aggregate, there are more detailed lists of the oldest Belgian, British, Danish, Dutch, Finnish, French, German, Irish, Italian, Norwegian, Portuguese, Spanish and Swedish people.

=== 50 Oldest European residents ever ===
Below is a list of the oldest 50 supercentenarians who have died or are living in Europe. The list including all known and validated supercentenarians who died before 2015 was compiled by the Gerontology Research Group (GRG). Later cases were sourced from more recent GRG data, as indicated in the table.

Deceased Living

Rank	Name (Note: All entries are sourced to GRG "table B" as of 1 January 2015, unless otherwise noted.)	Sex	Birth date	Death date	Age	Country
1	Jeanne Calment	F	21 February 1875	4 August 1997	122 years, 164 days	France
2	Lucile Randon	F	11 February 1904	17 January 2023	118 years, 340 days	France
3	Maria Branyas	F	4 March 1907	19 August 2024	117 years, 168 days	Spain (Note: Branyas was born in the United States.)
4	Emma Morano	F	29 November 1899	15 April 2017	117 years, 137 days	Italy
5	Ethel Caterham	F	21 August 1909	Living	117 years, 93 days	United Kingdom
6	Jeanne Bot	F	14 January 1905	22 May 2021	116 years, 128 days	France
7	Maria Giuseppa Robucci	F	20 March 1903	18 June 2019	116 years, 90 days	Italy
8	Tekla Juniewicz	F	10 June 1906	19 August 2022	116 years, 70 days	Poland (Note: Juniewicz was born in Krupsko (near Lviv), then in Austria-Hungary, now in Ukraine.)
9	Ana María Vela Rubio	F	29 October 1901	15 December 2017	116 years, 47 days	Spain
10	Giuseppina Projetto	F	30 May 1902	6 July 2018	116 years, 37 days	Italy
11	Lucia Laura Sangenito	F	22 November 1910	Living	116 years, 0 days	Italy
12	Marie-Rose Tessier	F	21 May 1910	10 February 2026	115 years, 265 days	France
13	Charlotte Hughes	F	1 August 1877	17 March 1993	115 years, 228 days	United Kingdom
14	Magdalena Oliver Gabarró	F	31 October 1903	1 May 2019	115 years, 182 days	Spain
15	Maria de Jesus	F	10 September 1893	2 January 2009	115 years, 114 days	Portugal
16	Marie Josephine Gaudette	F	25 March 1902	13 July 2017	115 years, 110 days	Italy (Note: Gaudette was born in the United States.)
17	Valentine Ligny	F	22 October 1906	4 January 2022	115 years, 74 days	France
18	Hendrikje van Andel-Schipper	F	29 June 1890	30 August 2005	115 years, 62 days	Netherlands
19	Marie Brémont	F	25 April 1886	6 June 2001	115 years, 42 days	France
20	Annie Jennings	F	12 November 1884	20 November 1999	115 years, 8 days	United Kingdom
21	Eva Morris	F	8 November 1885	2 November 2000	114 years, 360 days	United Kingdom
22	Klavdiya Gadyuchkina	F	5 December 1910	29 November 2025	114 years, 359 days	Russia
23	Andrée Bertoletto	F	1 January 1911	16 October 2025	114 years, 288 days	France
24	Maria do Couto Maia	F	24 October 1890	25 July 2005	114 years, 274 days	Portugal
25	Charlotte Kretschmann	F	3 December 1909	27 August 2024	114 years, 268 days	Germany (Note: Kretschmann was born in Breslau, then in the German Empire, now Wrocław in Poland.)
26	Venere Pizzinato	F	23 November 1896	2 August 2011	114 years, 252 days	Italy (Note: Pizzinato was born in Ala, which was then part of Austria-Hungary. It is now in Italy.)
27	Ethel Lang	F	27 May 1900	15 January 2015	114 years, 233 days	United Kingdom
28	María Antonia Castro	F	10 June 1881	16 January 1996	114 years, 220 days	Spain
29	Anna Eliza Williams	F	2 June 1873	27 December 1987	114 years, 208 days	United Kingdom
30	Lydie Vellard	F	18 March 1875	17 September 1989	114 years, 183 days	France
31	Gabrielle des Robert	F	4 June 1904	3 December 2018	114 years, 182 days	France
32	Camille Loiseau	F	13 February 1892	12 August 2006	114 years, 180 days	France
33	Anne Primout	F	5 October 1890	26 March 2005	114 years, 172 days	France (Note: Primout was born in French Algeria.)
34	Geertje Kuijntjes	F	19 July 1905	24 December 2019	114 years, 158 days	Netherlands
35	Madeleine Dellamonica	F	23 July 1912	Living	114 years, 122 days	France
36	Lucy Jane Askew	F	8 September 1883	9 December 1997	114 years, 92 days	United Kingdom
37	María Carmen del López	F	3 April 1883	3 July 1997	114 years, 91 days	Spain
38	Honorine Rondello	F	28 July 1903	19 October 2017	114 years, 83 days	France
38	Silveria Martín Díaz	F	20 June 1910	11 September 2024	114 years, 83 days	Spain
40	Joan Riudavets Moll	M	15 December 1889	5 March 2004	114 years, 81 days	Spain
41	Claudia Baccarini	F	13 October 1910	24 December 2024	114 years, 72 days	Italy
42	Anne Brasz-Later	F	16 July 1906	2 September 2020	114 years, 48 days	Netherlands
42	Marie-Louise Taterode	F	17 July 1906	3 September 2020	114 years, 48 days	France
44	Florrie Baldwin	F	31 March 1896	8 May 2010	114 years, 38 days	United Kingdom
45	Luise Pompe	F	13 October 1908	11 November 2022	114 years, 29 days	Austria (Note: Pompe was born in Czernowitz, then capital of Bukovina in Austria-Hungary, today Chernivtsi in Ukraine.)
46	Amy Hulmes	F	5 October 1887	27 October 2001	114 years, 22 days	United Kingdom
47	Marie Liguinen	F	26 March 1901	2 April 2015	114 years, 7 days	France
48	Marie-Thérèse Bardet	F	2 June 1898	8 June 2012	114 years, 6 days	France
49	Virginia Dighero-Zolezzi	F	24 December 1891	28 December 2005	114 years, 4 days	Italy
50	Maria Redaelli-Granoli	F	3 April 1899	2 April 2013	113 years, 364 days	Italy

=== 50 Oldest European emigrants ever ===
Below is a list of the oldest supercentenarians born in Europe who emigrated to another continent and either died or are still living there.

Rank	Name	Sex	Birth date	Death date	Age	Country of birth	Country of death or residence
1	Dina Manfredini	F	4 April 1897	17 December 2012	115 years, 257 days	Italy	United States
2	Christian Mortensen	M	16 August 1882	25 April 1998	115 years, 252 days	Denmark	United States
3	Augusta Holtz	F	3 August 1871	21 October 1986	115 years, 79 days	Germany (Note: Holtz was born in the Province of Posen, which was at the time of her birth a part of the German Empire. It is now located in Poland.)	United States
4	Goldie Steinberg	F	30 October 1900	16 August 2015	114 years, 290 days	Moldova (Note: Steinberg was born in Kishinev, which had then been a part of the Russian Empire. It is now the capital of Moldova.)	United States
5	Grace Clawson	F	15 November 1887	28 May 2002	114 years, 194 days	United Kingdom	United States
6	Charlotte Benkner	F	16 November 1889	14 May 2004	114 years, 180 days	Germany	United States
7	Ilse Meingast	F	14 March 1912	23 August 2026	114 years, 162 days	Germany	United States
8	Phyllis Ridgway	F	10 March 1907	4 June 2021	114 years, 86 days	United Kingdom	Canada
9	Maria Jorge Esteves de Almeida	F	28 May 1912	8 July 2026	114 years, 41 days	Portugal	Brazil
10	Anna Natella	F	21 November 1912	Living	114 years, 1 day	Italy	United States
11	Miriam Carpelan	F	8 July 1882	22 June 1996	113 years, 350 days	United Kingdom	United States
12	Goldie Michelson	F	8 August 1902	8 July 2016	113 years, 335 days	Ukraine (Note: Michelson was born in Elizabethgrad, which was then a part of the Russian Empire. It is now part of Ukraine.)	United States
13	Israel Kristal	M	15 September 1903	11 August 2017	113 years, 330 days	Poland (Note: Born in Congress Poland, part of the Russian Empire, which is today Poland.)	Israel
14	Amalia Barone	F	6 October 1884	26 June 1998	113 years, 263 days	Italy	United States
15	Malka "Mollie" Horwitz	F	16 March 1913	Living	113 years, 251 days	Lithuania (Note: Horwitz was born in Vilkomir, Vilnius County, then part of the Russian Empire, now in Lithuania.)	United States
16	Margaret Romans	F	16 March 1912	25 October 2025	113 years, 223 days	Latvia (Note: Romans was born in Latvia, then part of the Russian Empire, now an independent country.)	Canada
17	Luzia Mohrs	F	23 March 1904	16 October 2017	113 years, 207 days	Germany	Brazil
18	Louise Schaaf	F	16 October 1906	25 April 2020	113 years, 192 days	Germany	United States
19	Amarillide Bufalini	F	27 November 1876	15 May 1990	113 years, 169 days	Italy	United States
20	Kathleen Snavely	F	16 February 1902	6 July 2015	113 years, 140 days	Ireland (Note: Ireland was then a part of the United Kingdom. It is now an independent country.)	United States
21	Mary Drymalski	F	22 July 1880	1 December 1993	113 years, 132 days	Germany (Note: Drymalski was born in Culm, then in the German Empire, now Chełmno in Poland.)	United States
22	Florence Finch	F	22 December 1893	10 April 2007	113 years, 109 days	United Kingdom	New Zealand
22	Irene Zito Ciuffoletti	F	19 January 1903	7 May 2016	113 years, 109 days	Italy	United States
24	Maria Aulenbacher	F	7 November 1909	8 February 2023	113 years, 93 days	Germany	United States
25	Adelheid Kirschbaum	F	29 September 1883	21 December 1996	113 years, 83 days	Germany	United States
26	Betsy Baker	F	20 August 1842	24 October 1955	113 years, 65 days	United Kingdom	United States
27	Rose Girone	F	13 January 1912	24 February 2025	113 years, 42 days	Ukraine (Note: Girone was born in Janów, which was then a part of the Austria-Hungary, now Ivano-Frankove in Ukraine.)	United States
28	Alice Sjöquist	F	25 October 1878	7 November 1991	113 years, 13 days	United Kingdom	Canada
29	Fanny Martland	F	19 November 1888	1 December 2001	113 years, 12 days	United Kingdom	Canada
30	Elizabeth Stefan	F	13 May 1895	9 April 2008	112 years, 332 days	Hungary (Note: Hungary was at that time part of Austria-Hungary.)	United States
31	Anna Bechler	F	28 September 1907	29 July 2020	112 years, 305 days	Germany	United States
32	Helen Obermayer	F	20 January 1879	20 November 1991	112 years, 304 days	Hungary	United States
33	Marietta Capizzi	F	30 January 1901	10 November 2013	112 years, 284 days	Italy	United States
34	Pearl Lutzko	F	15 February 1899	2 November 2011	112 years, 260 days	Ukraine (Note: Lutzko was born in Chortkiv, which was then a part of Galicia in the Austrian-Hungarian Empire. It is now part of Ukraine.)	Canada
35	Henrietta Irwin	F	27 May 1906	15 January 2019	112 years, 233 days	United Kingdom	Canada
36	Gertruda Gorecka	F	12 November 1911	25 June 2024	112 years, 226 days	Germany (Note: Gorecka was born in Kamlau, then in the German Empire, now Kębłowo in Poland.)	Canada
37	Delio Venturotti	M	25 October 1909	1 June 2022	112 years, 219 days	Italy	Brazil
38	Margaret Vivian	F	25 February 1906	20 September 2018	112 years, 207 days	United Kingdom	Australia
39	Louisa Delfino	F	10 December 1886	29 June 1999	112 years, 201 days	Italy	United States
40	Amelia England	F	15 May 1900	30 November 2012	112 years, 199 days	United Kingdom	United States
41	Jane Gray	F	1 December 1901	7 June 2014	112 years, 188 days	United Kingdom	Australia
42	Catherine Abate	F	15 November 1909	7 May 2022	112 years, 173 days	Italy	United States
43	Mary Roberts	F	5 October 1906	11 March 2019	112 years, 157 days	United Kingdom	Canada
44	Vincenza Balassone-Colucci	F	24 January 1903	26 June 2015	112 years, 153 days	Italy	United States
45	Berta Rosenberg	F	5 September 1896	28 January 2009	112 years, 145 days	Germany	United States
46	Martha Rein	F	17 August 1874	6 January 1987	112 years, 142 days	Germany	United States
47	Esther Ecklund	F	28 October 1901	12 March 2014	112 years, 135 days	Sweden	United States
48	Leonora Cox	F	30 December 1907	6 April 2020	112 years, 98 days	United Kingdom	United States
49	Salustiano Sanchez	M	8 June 1901	13 September 2013	112 years, 97 days	Spain	United States
50	Rosaria Caleca	F	5 February 1895	6 May 2007	112 years, 90 days	Italy	United States

== African supercentenarians ==
This is an incomplete list of people born in Africa who have lived at least 110 years. Most of the listed persons were born in former colonies that already maintained systematic birth records in the 19th century. Many other supercentenarian cases likely exist in Africa, but are not adequately documented.

Deceased Living

Rank	Name (Note: All entries are sourced to GRG "table B" as of 1 January 2015, unless otherwise noted.)	Sex	Birth date	Death date	Age	Country of birth	Country of death or residence
1	Adelina Domingues	F	19 February 1888	21 August 2002	114 years, 183 days	Cape Verde (Note: Domingues was born in Cape Verde, which was at that time a Portuguese colony. Now it is an independent country.)	United States
2	Anne Primout	F	5 October 1890	26 March 2005	114 years, 172 days	French Algeria (Note: Pied-Noir persons were born in colonial Algeria, and moved to mainland France upon Algeria's independence in 1962.)	France
3	Marcelle Narbonne	F	25 March 1898	1 January 2012	113 years, 282 days	French Algeria	France
4	Marie-Isabelle Diaz	F	22 February 1898	29 October 2011	113 years, 249 days	French Algeria	Réunion, France
5	Julia Sinédia-Cazour	F	12 July 1892	6 October 2005	113 years, 86 days	Réunion, France	Réunion, France
6	Suzanne Décélis	F	13 July 1909	6 January 2022	112 years, 177 days	French Algeria	France
7	Hélène Malfuson	F	29 June 1914	4 October 2026	112 years, 97 days	Tunisia (Note: Malfuson and Diliberto were born in Tunisia, which was at that time a French protectorate. Now it is an independent country.)	France
8	Consuelo Moreno-López	F	5 February 1893	13 November 2004	111 years, 282 days	Sultanate of Morocco	United States
9	Suzanne Faivre	F	13 August 1906	26 April 2018	111 years, 256 days	French Algeria	France
10	Johanna Adonis	F	5 August 1907	1 February 2019	111 years, 180 days	Cape Colony	South Africa
11	Émile Fourcade	M	29 July 1884	29 December 1995	111 years, 153 days	French Algeria	France
12	Camille Bensaïd	F	12 November 1909	19 November 2020	111 years, 7 days	French Algeria	France
13	Gabrielle Rambaud	F	14 March 1897	31 January 2008	110 years, 323 days	French Algeria	France
14	Jeanne Hue	F	2 October 1895	5 May 2006	110 years, 215 days	French Algeria	France
15	Rose Campos	F	9 May 1908	25 October 2018	110 years, 169 days	French Algeria	France
16	Rosalba Castro Bello	F	15 February 1907	17 July 2017	110 years, 152 days	Canary Islands, Spain	Canary Islands, Spain
17	Vita Italia Diliberto	F	1 January 1914	26 April 2024	110 years, 116 days	Tunisia	Italy
18	José Martins	M	7 March 1912	14 May 2022	110 years, 68 days	Madeira, Portugal	Madeira, Portugal

== Asian supercentenarians ==
This is an incomplete list of supercentenarians who were born or died in Asia, or are living there. According to the Gerontology Research Group, the verified oldest Asian person ever is Kane Tanaka of Japan, who died on 19 April 2022, aged 119 years and 107 days. The verified oldest man is Jiroemon Kimura, also from Japan, who died on 12 June 2013, aged 116 years and 54 days. As of 22 November 2026, the oldest living person in Asia is Fuyo Kishimoto of Japan.

The vast majority of verified Asian cases of supercentenarians come from Japan, which has kept birth records for more than a century, while other Asian countries have historically been less meticulous about keeping such records. According to The Washington Post, China and India have many supercentenarians, but nearly none are confirmed, as their governments did not track births prior to the early 1900s.

=== Notable supercentenarians from other Asian countries ===
Rank	Name	Sex	Birth date	Death date	Age	Country of birth	Country of death or residence
1	Israel Kristal	M	15 September 1903	11 August 2017	113 years, 330 days	Congress Poland, Russian Empire	Israel
2	Shi Ping	M	1 November 1911	29 June 2024	112 years, 241 days	Qing China	China

=== Oldest known Asian emigrants ===
Deceased Living

Rank	Name	Sex	Birth date	Death date	Age	Country of birth	Country of death or residence
1	Lucy Mirigian	F	15 August 1906	12 February 2021	114 years, 181 days	Ottoman Armenia (Note: Mirigian and Maloyan were born in Erzurum in Erzurum vilayet, which was then part of Western Armenia in the Ottoman Empire.)	United States
2	Lucy d'Abreu	F	24 May 1892	7 December 2005	113 years, 197 days	Mysore, British Raj	United Kingdom
3	Ito Konno Kinase	F	31 December 1889	24 January 2003	113 years, 24 days	Japan	United States
4	Ethel Farrell	F	27 November 1902	20 December 2015	113 years, 23 days	United Provinces, British Raj	Australia
5	Anonymous	F	6 July 1912	18 July 2025	113 years, 12 days	Japan	Brazil
6	Tameko Shijo	F	1 January 1904	25 June 2016	112 years, 176 days	Japan	United States
7	Masao Kōge	F	30 April 1913	20 April 2025	111 years, 355 days	Korea (Note: Kōge was born in the southern part of Korea, which was at that time part of a Japanese colony. Now it is an independent country.)	Japan
8	Chin-Tao Huang	F	15 May 1915	Living	111 years, 191 days	Taiwan (Note: Huang was born in Taiwan, which was at the time of her birth part of the Empire of Japan.)	Australia
9	Frank Simes	M	10 July 1905	18 September 2016	111 years, 70 days	Ottoman Empire	United Kingdom
10	Yoshi Matsumoto	F	7 April 1914	6 April 2025	110 years, 364 days	Japan	Brazil
11	Otoji Hasegawa	M	3 December 1915	Living	110 years, 354 days	Japan	Brazil
12	Shizuka LaGrange	F	30 October 1902	18 October 2013	110 years, 353 days	Japan	United States
13	Mabel Maloyan	F	26 December 1881	15 November 1992	110 years, 325 days	Ottoman Armenia	United States
14	Apolonia Malate	F	4 March 1899	4 December 2009	110 years, 275 days	Philippines, U.S. (Note: Malate was born in the Philippines, which was then a colony of the United States.)	United States
15	Rui Maruyama	F	20 August 1885	26 April 1996	110 years, 250 days	Japan	United States
16	Fuyu Miwa	F	12 January 1889	16 July 1999	110 years, 185 days	Japan	United States
17	Hanayo Kami	F	15 September 1894	18 January 2005	110 years, 125 days	Japan	United States
18	Yoki Koizumi	F	3 February 1895	8 March 2005	110 years, 33 days	Japan	United States
19	Rose Haddad	F	15 April 1901	29 April 2011	110 years, 14 days	Ottoman Syria	United States

== Oldest people from Oceania ever ==
Below is a list of the 50 oldest people who have died or are living in Oceania. The Gerontology Research Group (GRG) compiled a list in 2015 of supercentenarians they had validated up to then. Later cases are sourced from more recent GRG data, from administrative reports or from press coverage, as indicated in the table. All Australian supercentenarians born prior to 1 January 1901 with their birthplace listed as Australia were born in the British colonies of Australia. All supercentenarians listed with New Zealand as their place of birth who were born prior to 26 September 1907, were born in the British colony of New Zealand.

Deceased Living

Rank	Name	Sex	Birth date	Death date	Age	Country of birth	Country of death or residence
1	Christina Cock	F	25 December 1887	22 May 2002	114 years, 148 days	Australia	Australia
2	Beatrice Mears	F	4 March 1888	3 December 2001	113 years, 274 days	Australia	Australia
3	Florence Finch	F	22 December 1893	10 April 2007	113 years, 109 days	United Kingdom	New Zealand
4	Aileen Kars	F	12 September 1913	Living	113 years, 71 days	New Zealand	New Zealand
5	Ken Weeks	M	5 October 1913	Living	113 years, 48 days	Australia	Australia
6	Ito Konno Kinase	F	31 December 1889	24 January 2003	113 years, 24 days	Japan	Hawaii, United States
7	Ethel Farrell	F	27 November 1902	20 December 2015	113 years, 23 days	British India (Note: Farrell was born in India, which was at the time of her birth a British colony.)	Australia
8	Molly Yeomans	F	1 July 1888	30 May 2001	112 years, 333 days	Australia	Australia
9	Caroline Mockridge	F	11 December 1874	6 November 1987	112 years, 330 days	Australia	Australia
10	Myra Nicholson	F	14 December 1894	20 September 2007	112 years, 280 days	Australia	Australia
11	Violet "Vi" Robbins	F	28 February 1902	8 October 2014	112 years, 222 days	Australia	Australia
12	E. Beatrice Riley	F	13 October 1896	15 May 2009	112 years, 214 days	Australia	Australia
13	Margaret Vivian	F	25 February 1906	21 September 2018	112 years, 208 days	United Kingdom	Australia
14	Jane Gray	F	1 December 1901	7 June 2014	112 years, 188 days	United Kingdom	Australia
15	Marie-Louise L'Huillier	F	26 June 1895	28 December 2007	112 years, 185 days	New Caledonia, France	New Caledonia, France
16	Dorothy Imako Ikeda	F	14 September 1911	24 February 2024	112 years, 163 days	Territory of Hawaii, U.S.	Hawaii, United States
17	Lorna Henstridge	F	6 June 1914	7 September 2026	112 years, 93 days	Australia	Australia
18	Dora Caverson	F	10 September 1914	Living	112 years, 73 days	United Kingdom	Australia
19	Jessie Hurley	F	15 June 1890	6 August 2002	112 years, 52 days	Australia	Australia
20	Miriam Schmierer	F	20 August 1899	29 September 2011	112 years, 40 days	Australia	Australia
21	Gizella Simon	F	20 November 1914	Living	112 years, 2 days	Hungary (Note: Simon was born in Debrecen, which was at the time of her birth part of Austria-Hungary.)	Australia
22	Laurence Thompson	M	23 January 1887	24 October 1998	111 years, 274 days	Hawaiian Kingdom	United States
23	Myrtle Jones	F	18 April 1897	12 January 2009	111 years, 269 days	Australia	Australia
24	Linda Williams	F	3 March 1915	Living	111 years, 264 days	Australia	Australia
25	Stella Correll	F	23 December 1888	7 September 2000	111 years, 259 days	Australia	Australia
26	Jane Piercy	F	2 September 1869	3 May 1981	111 years, 243 days	Australia	Australia
27	Marjorie Cooke	F	5 January 1906	1 September 2017	111 years, 239 days	Australia	Australia
28	Bridget Grocke	F	18 November 1914	4 June 2026	111 years, 198 days	Australia	Australia
29	Chin-Tao Huang	F	15 May 1915	Living	111 years, 191 days	Taiwan (Note: Huang was born in Taiwan, which was at the time of her birth part of the Empire of Japan.)	Australia
30	Dexter Kruger	M	13 January 1910	20 July 2021	111 years, 188 days	Australia	Australia
31	Hanako Hashimoto	F	9 December 1909	22 May 2021	111 years, 164 days	Territory of Hawaii, U.S.	Hawaii, United States
32	Thelma McLeod	F	13 February 1907	19 July 2018	111 years, 156 days	Australia	Australia
33	Catherina van der Linden	F	26 August 1912	26 January 2024	111 years, 153 days	Netherlands	Australia
34	Beatrice Pollock	F	2 March 1881	30 July 1992	111 years, 150 days	Australia	Australia
35	Marie Weber	F	2 October 1893	27 February 2005	111 years, 148 days	United States	Hawaii, United States
36	Ina Reid	F	17 December 1910	13 May 2022	111 years, 147 days	Australia	Australia
37	Ada Stockdale	F	14 February 1885	24 June 1996	111 years, 131 days	United Kingdom	Australia
38	Jack Lockett	M	22 January 1891	25 May 2002	111 years, 123 days	Australia	Australia
39	Mary Gwendoline Moore	F	2 December 1911	31 March 2023	111 years, 119 days	United Kingdom	Australia
40	Mabel Crosby	F	7 September 1909	30 December 2020	111 years, 114 days	United Kingdom	Australia
41	Ivy Tate	F	19 August 1910	6 December 2021	111 years, 109 days	United Kingdom	Australia
42	Eva McConnell	F	5 May 1901	15 August 2012	111 years, 102 days	Australia	Australia
43	Alice Lindsay	F	31 March 1893	1 July 2004	111 years, 92 days	Australia	Australia
44	Mary Whitehurst	F	20 October 1905	2 January 2017	111 years, 74 days	United Kingdom	Australia
45	Mary Nixon	F	17 March 1871	10 May 1982	111 years, 54 days	Australia	Australia
46	Madeline Anderson	F	4 May 1907	19 June 2018	111 years, 46 days	New Zealand	New Zealand
47	Alice McNicholl	F	9 October 1915	Living	111 years, 44 days	United Kingdom	Australia
48	Bill Morgan	M	23 October 1915	Living	111 years, 30 days	Australia	Australia
49	Miyuki Iwaki	F	10 April 1911	7 May 2022	111 years, 27 days	Territory of Hawaii, U.S.	United States
50	Eileen Dinning	F	10 May 1890	2 June 2001	111 years, 23 days	Australia	Australia

== North American supercentenarians ==
=== Other North American countries and territories ever ===
Deceased Living

Rank	Name (Note: All entries are sourced to GRG "table B" as of 1 January 2015, unless otherwise noted.)	Sex	Birth date	Death date	Age	Country of birth	Country of death or residence
1	Violet Brown	F	10 March 1900	15 September 2017	117 years, 189 days	British West Indies	Jamaica (Note: Jamaica became independent in 1962.)
2	Emiliano Mercado del Toro	M	21 August 1891	24 January 2007	115 years, 156 days	Puerto Rico, Spain (Note: Spain ceded Puerto Rico to the United States in 1898.)	Puerto Rico, U.S.
3	Guillermina Acosta Bilbao	F	27 November 1901	13 February 2017	115 years, 78 days	Panama (Note: Before the formal secession in 1903, Panama was part of Gran Colombia.)	Panama
4	Antonia Gerena Rivera	F	19 May 1900	2 June 2015	115 years, 14 days	Puerto Rico, U.S.	United States
5	Ramona Trinidad Iglesias-Jordan	F	1 September 1889	29 May 2004	114 years, 271 days	Puerto Rico, Spain	Puerto Rico, U.S.
6	Eugénie Blanchard	F	16 February 1896	4 November 2010	114 years, 261 days	Saint Barthélemy, France	Saint Barthélemy, France
7	Faustina Sarmiento-Pupo	F	15 February 1905	16 September 2019	114 years, 213 days	Cuba	Cuba
8	Tomás Pinales Figuereo	M	31 March 1906	24 September 2020	114 years, 177 days	Dominican Republic	Dominican Republic
9	Dominga Velasco	F	12 May 1901	11 October 2015	114 years, 152 days	Mexico	United States
10	Sofia Mendoza Valencia	F	27 March 1907	21 August 2021	114 years, 147 days	Mexico	Mexico
11	Marita Camacho Quirós	F	10 March 1911	20 June 2025	114 years, 102 days	Costa Rica	Costa Rica
12	Serafina Herrera de Sugasti	F	21 May 1901	4 August 2015	114 years, 75 days	Panama	Panama
13	Soledad Mexia	F	13 August 1899	30 August 2013	114 years, 17 days	Mexico	United States
14	Merah Smith	F	9 November 1912	Living	114 years, 13 days	British West Indies	United Kingdom
15	Ida Stewart	F	13 November 1896	12 November 2010	113 years, 364 days	British West Indies	Jamaica
16	Mercedes Brenes Estrada	F	15 August 1910	5 July 2024	113 years, 325 days	Nicaragua	Nicaragua
17	Amalia López Celis	F	18 September 1900	16 July 2014	113 years, 301 days	Mexico	Mexico
18	Luce Maced	F	2 May 1886	25 February 2000	113 years, 299 days	Guadeloupe, France	Martinique, France
19	Eulalia Bravo Bravo	F	12 February 1913	Living	113 years, 283 days	Mexico	Mexico
20	Susana Gutiérrez Godoy	F	24 May 1910	4 January 2024	113 years, 225 days	Mexico	Mexico
20	Émilienne Bécarmin	F	4 June 1911	15 January 2025	113 years, 225 days	Guadeloupe, France	Guadeloupe, France
22	Dolores María Vázquez	F	1 May 1911	23 October 2024	113 years, 175 days	Panama	Panama
23	Clara Cedeño-Tello	F	12 August 1906	11 January 2020	113 years, 152 days	Panama	Panama
24	Mauro Ambriz Tapia	M	21 November 1897	18 April 2011	113 years, 148 days	Mexico	Mexico
25	Ursula Krigger	F	22 April 1902	10 September 2015	113 years, 141 days	Danish West Indies	U.S. Virgin Islands (Note: Denmark sold its Caribbean islands to the United States in 1917.)
26	Celmira Somoza Sotelo de Espinoza	F	21 August 1910	7 January 2024	113 years, 139 days	Nicaragua	Nicaragua
27	Lillian Anderson	F	28 February 1898	2 July 2011	113 years, 124 days	British West Indies	Jamaica
28	Julie Montabord	F	17 April 1906	18 July 2019	113 years, 92 days	Martinique, France	Martinique, France
29	James Sisnett	M	22 February 1900	23 May 2013	113 years, 90 days	British West Indies	Barbados (Note: Barbados became independent in 1966.)
29	Wenceslao Leyva González	M	28 September 1903	27 December 2016	113 years, 90 days	Mexico	Mexico
31	Domingo Villa Avisencio	M	26 August 1906	3 November 2019	113 years, 69 days	Mexico	Mexico
32	Bienvenida Vergara Jaen de Cano	F	6 April 1904	6 June 2017	113 years, 61 days	Panama	Panama
33	Antonia Valderrama-Ocampo	F	11 April 1907	9 June 2020	113 years, 59 days	Mexico	Mexico
34	Marthe Roch	F	19 August 1907	21 September 2020	113 years, 33 days	Guadeloupe, France	Guadeloupe, France
35	Zoraida Montezuma	F	31 October 1913	Living	113 years, 22 days	Costa Rica	Costa Rica
36	Cristina Collado Ramos	F	6 November 1885	22 November 1998	113 years, 16 days	Puerto Rico, Spain	United States
37	Emilio Flores Márquez	M	8 August 1908	12 August 2021	113 years, 4 days	Puerto Rico, U.S.	Puerto Rico, U.S.
38	Enriqueta Moreno Casares	F	15 July 1910	17 June 2023	112 years, 337 days	Mexico	Mexico
39	Marcelina Araúz de Maure	F	1 June 1909	26 March 2022	112 years, 298 days	Panama	Panama
40	María Mercedes Arrocha Graell	F	24 September 1905	3 July 2018	112 years, 282 days	Panama	Panama
41	Esperanza Mendoza Hermosillo	F	9 August 1909	21 April 2022	112 years, 255 days	Mexico	Mexico
42	Carmen Bonilla-Villanueva	F	6 July 1898	9 March 2011	112 years, 246 days	Mexico	United States
43	Manuela Peña Hernández	F	17 June 1907	31 January 2020	112 years, 228 days	Dominican Republic	Dominican Republic
44	Vertulie Giordani	F	18 March 1904	30 October 2016	112 years, 226 days	Haiti	United States
45	Lucía Chacón Hechavarría	F	13 December 1911	22 July 2024	112 years, 222 days	Cuba	Cuba
46	Modesta Rodriguez Carrasquillo	F	16 June 1890	12 January 2003	112 years, 210 days	Puerto Rico, Spain	Puerto Rico, U.S.
47	Santos Fierro	F	23 July 1913	14 February 2026	112 years, 206 days	Mexico	United States
48	Irénise Moulonguet	F	6 November 1900	28 May 2013	112 years, 203 days	Martinique, France	Martinique, France
49	María Isabel León Ramírez	F	17 June 1906	22 December 2018	112 years, 188 days	Mexico	Mexico
50	Ambrosia Acosta-Teran	F	21 February 1904	25 August 2016	112 years, 186 days	Mexico	Mexico

== South American supercentenarians ==
Beyond the 50 oldest South Americans in aggregate, there are more detailed lists of the oldest Argentine, Brazilian and Colombian people.

Deceased Living

Rank	Name	Sex	Birth date	Death date	Age	Country of birth	Country of death or residence
1	Francisca Celsa dos Santos	F	21 October 1904	5 October 2021	116 years, 349 days	Brazil	Brazil
2	María Capovilla	F	14 September 1889	27 August 2006	116 years, 347 days	Ecuador	Ecuador
3	Inah Canabarro Lucas	F	8 June 1908	30 April 2025	116 years, 326 days	Brazil	Brazil
4	Antonia da Santa Cruz	F	13 June 1905	23 January 2022	116 years, 224 days	Brazil	Brazil
5	Yolanda Beltrão de Azevedo	F	13 January 1911	Living	115 years, 313 days	Brazil	Brazil
6	Beatriz Ferreira Duarte	F	21 June 1911	Living	115 years, 154 days	Brazil	Brazil
7	Casilda Benegas Gallego	F	8 April 1907	28 June 2022	115 years, 81 days	Paraguay	Argentina
8	Sofia Rojas	F	13 August 1907	30 July 2022	114 years, 351 days	Colombia	Colombia
9	Maria Gomes Valentim	F	9 July 1896	21 June 2011	114 years, 347 days	Brazil	Brazil
10	Izabel Rosa Pereira	F	13 October 1910	24 September 2025	114 years, 346 days	Brazil	Brazil
11	Juan Vicente Pérez	M	27 May 1909	2 April 2024	114 years, 311 days	Venezuela	Venezuela
12	Eudoxie Baboul	F	1 October 1901	1 July 2016	114 years, 274 days	French Guiana (Note: French Guiana is an overseas department and region of France.)	French Guiana
13	Horacio Celi Mendoza	M	3 January 1897	25 September 2011	114 years, 265 days	Peru	Peru
14	Eleonora Camargo Veiga	F	14 August 1901	7 March 2016	114 years, 206 days	Brazil	Brazil
15	Maria Mercedes Diaz Quijano	F	27 June 1898	4 December 2012	114 years, 160 days	Chile	Chile
16	Ana Nogueira de Luca	F	21 June 1896	18 November 2010	114 years, 150 days	Brazil	Brazil
17	Maria Paschoalina de Castro	F	2 May 1911	5 August 2025	114 years, 95 days	Brazil	Brazil
18	Evangelista Luisa Lopez de Contarino	F	21 June 1907	28 August 2021	114 years, 68 days	Argentina	Argentina
19	Carmen Jaramillo-Chavarria	F	17 May 1906	15 July 2020	114 years, 59 days	Colombia	Colombia
20	João Marinho Neto	M	5 October 1912	Living	114 years, 48 days	Brazil	Brazil
21	Maria Jorge Esteves de Almeida	F	28 May 1912	8 July 2026	114 years, 41 days	Portugal	Brazil
22	Rosa Micaela Puertas Quiroga	F	29 September 1912	1 November 2026	114 years, 33 days	Argentina	Argentina
23	Angélica Tiscornia	F	22 August 1912	15 September 2026	114 years, 24 days	Argentina	Argentina
24	Placida Maria do Livramento	F	3 October 1895	24 October 2009	114 years, 21 days	Brazil	Brazil
25	Margarita Arriagada Cancino	F	17 December 1897	16 December 2011	113 years, 364 days	Chile	Chile
26	Juana Aritama de Fuentes	F	24 June 1907	21 May 2021	113 years, 331 days	Colombia	Colombia
27	Dolores Velez Bravo	F	21 November 1907	12 October 2021	113 years, 325 days	Ecuador	Ecuador
28	Efraín Antonio Ríos García	M	4 April 1910	11 January 2024	113 years, 282 days	Colombia	Colombia
29	Francisca Mangonez Martínez	F	4 July 1910	18 March 2024	113 years, 258 days	Colombia	Colombia
30	Isabel Barletta	F	12 September 1911	12 May 2025	113 years, 242 days	Argentina	Argentina
31	Luzia Mohrs	F	23 March 1904	16 October 2017	113 years, 207 days	Germany	Brazil
32	Alida Victória Grubba Rudge	F	10 July 1903	23 December 2016	113 years, 166 days	Brazil	Brazil
32	Mariana Penna Monteiro	F	2 September 1912	15 February 2026	113 years, 166 days	Brazil	Brazil
34	Ada Avila	F	14 January 1910	11 June 2023	113 years, 148 days	Ecuador	United States
35	Amalia Gomes Dantas	F	6 December 1908	18 April 2022	113 years, 133 days	Brazil	Brazil
36	Eusebio Quintero López	M	6 March 1910	16 July 2023	113 years, 132 days	Colombia	Colombia
37	Luisa Maggioni	F	19 July 1913	Living	113 years, 126 days	Brazil	Brazil
38	Rosa Laura Torres Barra	F	20 July 1913	Living	113 years, 125 days	Chile	Chile
39	Josepha Pomares Camargo	F	21 April 1911	18 June 2024	113 years, 58 days	Brazil	Brazil
40	Virginia Secundina Moyano	F	17 May 1904	20 June 2017	113 years, 34 days	Argentina	Argentina
41	Eudocia Barría Barrientos	F	10 February 1911	5 March 2024	113 years, 24 days	Chile	Chile
42	Anonymous	F	6 July 1912	18 July 2025	113 years, 12 days	Japan	Brazil
43	Josefina Neto de Assis Silveira	F	22 March 1902	24 March 2015	113 years, 2 days	Brazil	Brazil
44	Benilda Ospino Altamar	F	28 December 1897	28 December 2010	113 years, 0 days	Colombia	Colombia
45	Rosa Maria Barbosa	F	26 May 1902	4 May 2015	112 years, 343 days	Brazil	Brazil
46	G. M. de A. F.	F	12 April 1911	18 March 2024	112 years, 341 days	Brazil	Brazil
47	Natalia Villanueva Ruiz	F	24 February 1911	21 December 2023	112 years, 300 days	Colombia	Colombia
48	Azucena Lucía Suárez Wilde de Ricotti	F	1 July 1893	18 April 2006	112 years, 291 days	Argentina	Argentina
49	Maria Alaíde Menezes	F	5 July 1912	30 March 2025	112 years, 268 days	Brazil	Brazil
50	Izabel Emiliana de Oliveira	F	26 August 1900	4 May 2013	112 years, 251 days	Brazil	Brazil
50	Henriqueta Soares Marques	F	6 May 1911	12 January 2024	112 years, 251 days	Brazil	Brazil
