= Johanna Booyson =

- Born: Johanna Maria Magdalena Drotsky; January 17, 1857; Heidelberg, Sedibeng, South Africa
- Died: June 16, 1968 (aged 111); Belfast, South Africa
- Known for: Being a supercentenarian

Johanna Booyson (January 17, 1857 — June 16, 1968) was a disputed South African supercentenarian who lived to be 111 years and 151 days old.

== Biography ==
Johanna Maria Magdalena Booyson (née Drotsky) was born on January 17, 1857 in Heidelberg, Sedibeng, South Africa. She was the daughter of Marthinus Johannes Drotsky and his wife Francina Geertruida Elizabeth.

At the age of 16, she married her first husband, Joshua Andries Joubert, with whom she had 16 children. She had her first child at 18, a son, whom she would later outlive. She worked as a nurse and made sheepskin mats. According to an interview with a local newspaper, she had never left the Transvaal province of South Africa.

Her children with Joubert include:

- Gideon Johannes Joubert (born November 1, 1880)
- Jan Johannes Joubert (born 1884)
- Marthinus Johannes Joubert (born March 7, 1886)
- Josua Andries Joubert (born 1891)
- Gerhardus Francois Joubert (born November 02, 1892)
- Jacobus Johannes Joubert (born 1894)
- Pieter Willem Hendrik Joubert (born May 19, 1895)

During her later years, Booyson lived with her granddaughter Frances Coetzee, who herself had 9 children. She celebrated her 111th birthday by taking snuff. According to a newspaper article after her birthday, she still did not use glasses and read the Bible in High Dutch.

On March 21, 1968, Booyson became the oldest person in the world at the time, following the death of British supercentenarian John Mosley Turner. She was 111 years old.

== Legacy and disputes ==
Booyson died in Belfast, South Africa on June 16, 1968. She was the first verified supercentenarian from Africa, although her record was broken by Julia Sinédia-Cazour from Réunion in 2003. Booyson outlived both of her husbands, as well as 11 of her 16 children. Booyson was estimated to have 600 living descendants in 1968.

The Gerontology Research Group disputes Booyson's claims that she was born in 1857, instead proposing she was born in 1867, making her 101 years old upon her death. The website does not list Booyson on its list of South African supercentenarians. Jimmy Lindberg of LongeviQuest also disputes Booyson's story.
