= List of centenarians (explorers) =

The following is a list of centenarians – specifically, people who became famous as explorers – known for reasons other than their longevity. For more lists, see lists of centenarians.

Name	Lifespan	Age	Notability
Riccardo Cassin	1909–2009	100	Italian mountaineer
Marvin Creamer	1916–2020	104	American sailor
Hulda Crooks	1896–1997	101	American mountaineer
Alexandra David-Néel	1868–1969	100	French explorer, anarchist, spiritualist, Buddhist and writer
Ardito Desio	1897–2001	104	Italian explorer, mountain climber, geologist and cartographer
Alf Howard	1906–2010	104	Australian explorer, scientist and educator
Helge Ingstad	1899–2001	101	Norwegian explorer
Jean Malaurie	1922–2024	101	French explorer and anthropologist
Dame Freya Stark	1893–1993	100	British explorer and travel writer
Norman D. Vaughan	1905–2005	100	American Arctic explorer
Jean-Frédéric Waldeck	c. 1766–1875	109?	French explorer
Miroslav Zikmund	1919–2021	101	Czech explorer and travel writer
