= Lucile Randon =

French supercentenarian (1904–2023)

Lucile Randon DC
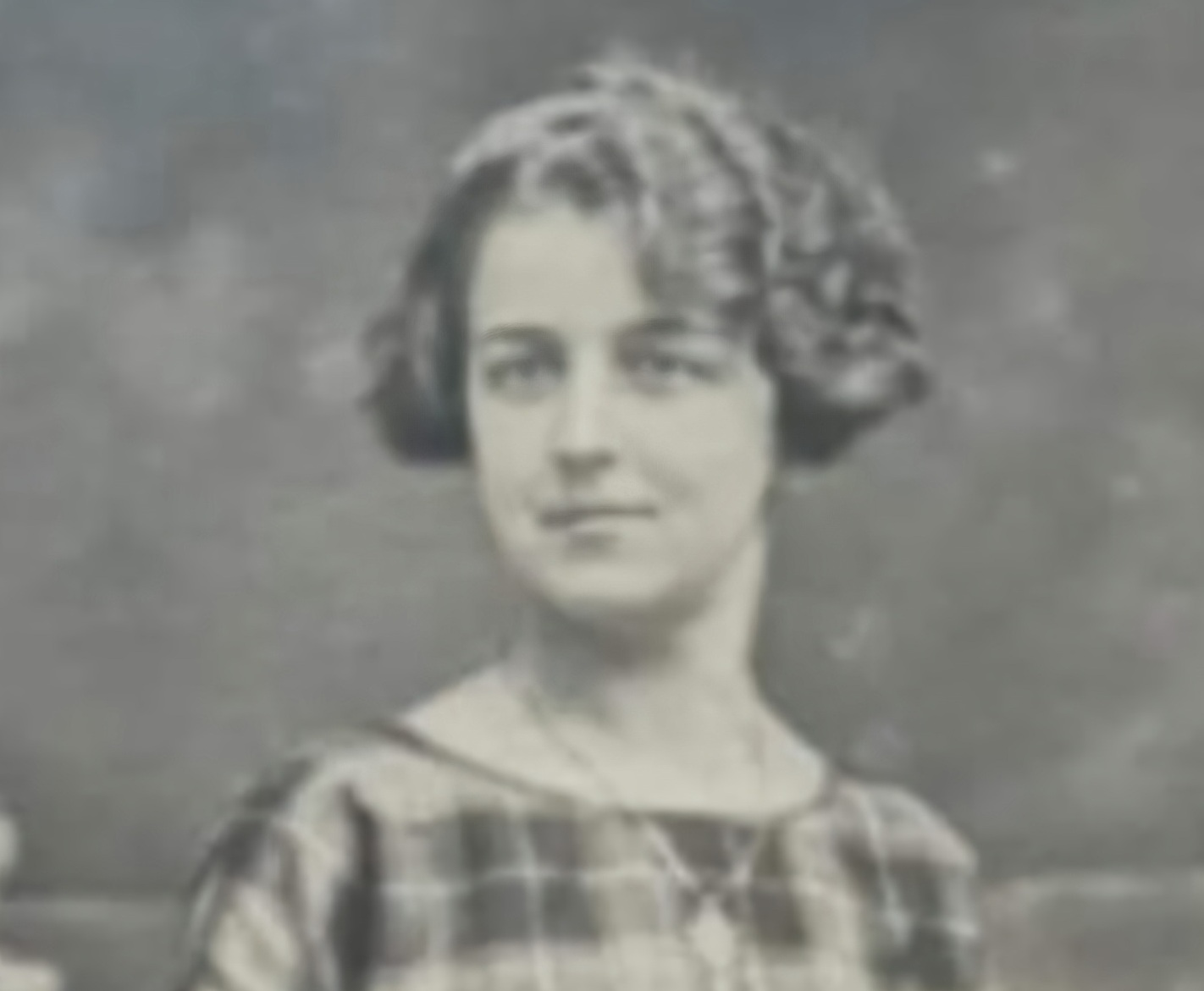
- Randon in 1924
- Born: 11 February 1904; Alès, France
- Died: 17 January 2023 (aged 118 years, 340 days); Toulon, France
- Other name: Sister André
- Occupation: Catholic nun
- Known for: Oldest known living person (19 April 2022 – 17 January 2023); Oldest confirmed survivor of the COVID-19 pandemic; Fourth oldest validated person ever

Lucile Randon DC (French: [ly.sil ʁɑ̃.dɔ̃]; 11 February 1904 – 17 January 2023), also known as Sister André (French: Sœur André), was a French supercentenarian who, until her death at the age of 118 years, 340 days, was the world's oldest verified living person following the death of Kane Tanaka on 19 April 2022. She is the fourth-oldest verified person ever, the oldest nun ever, the oldest person ever to have not had children, and the oldest confirmed survivor of the COVID-19 pandemic, having tested positive for SARS-CoV-2 a month before her 117th birthday. She is also the only person to date to have died at the age of 118.

As a young adult, Randon converted to Roman Catholicism and worked as a governess, teacher, nun, and missionary before retiring at the age of 75 in 1979. She lived in a nursing home in Toulon, France from 2009 until her death.

== Personal life ==
Randon was born on 11 February 1904 in Alès, France to Paul Randon and Alphonsine Delphine Yéta Soutoul. Her living siblings included three older brothers and a twin sister named Lydie, who died a year after they were born. Lucile became a governess to three children in Marseille when she was twenty years old in 1924. She took on more responsibility when she was hired as both a governess and teacher by a prominent family, the Peugeots, in Versailles in 1928. Her work as a governess and teacher at Versailles lasted until 1930 when she became governess for the Borionne family in Paris and then in Ardèche until 1944.

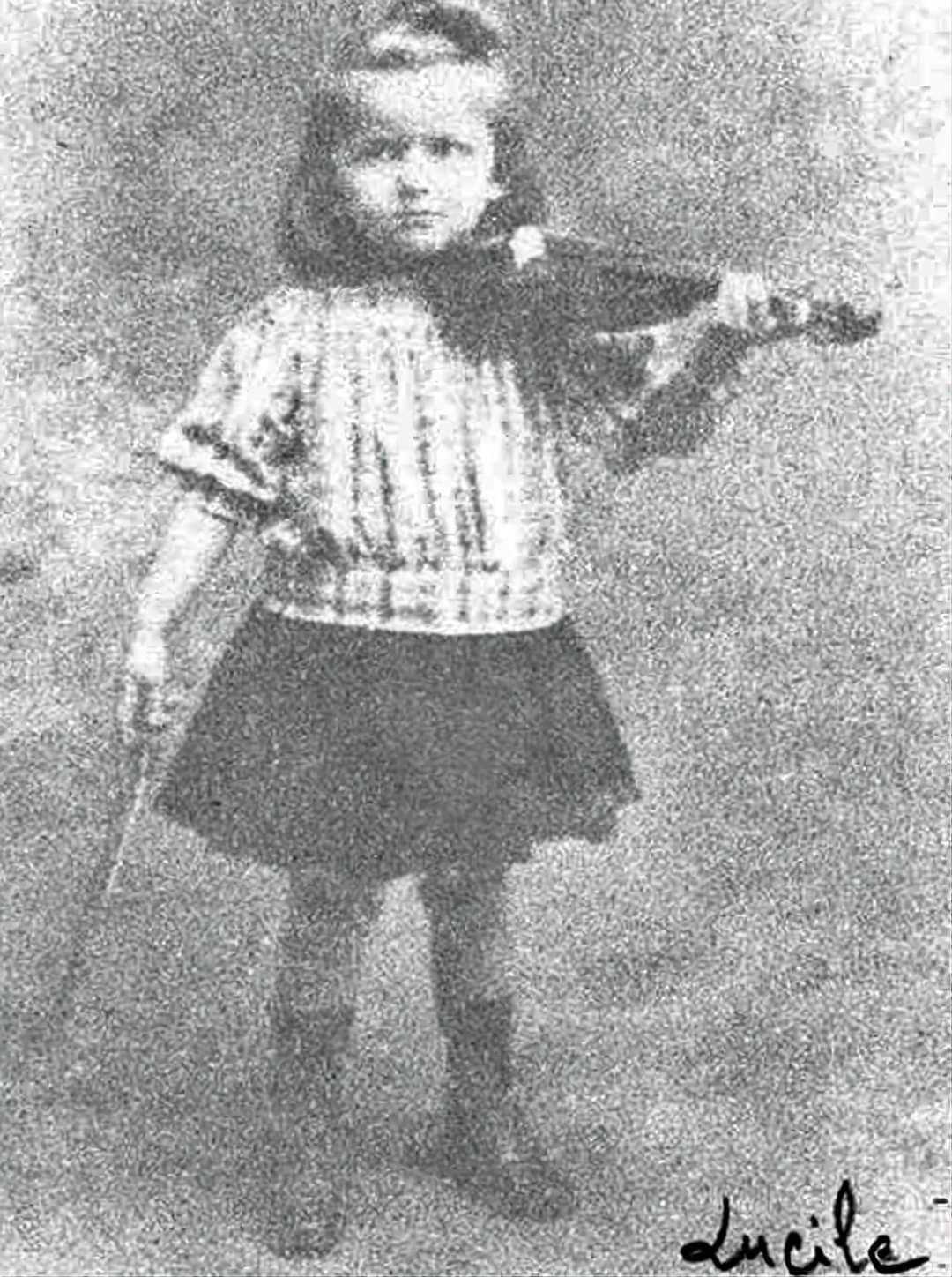
Randon as a young child c. 1907

Randon grew up in a Huguenot Protestant family and her paternal grandfather Casimir Randon (1822–1908) was a pastor. She converted to Catholicism in 1923 at the age of 19. In 1944 she joined the Catholic order Daughters of Charity, taking the name Sister André in honour of her elder brother. After World War II ended, Randon went on a mission to a hospital in Vichy, where she served orphans and elders. Her mission lasted 18 years until she was sent to another hospital at La Baume-d'Hostun, Drôme, for night duty in 1963. Randon retired from full-time work in 1979 and entered the EHPAD in the Marches at Savoie, where she continued to care for the elderly until she was 100 years old. She moved to the Ste. Catherine Labouré retirement home in Toulon on 25 October 2009, at the age of 105.

== Health and longevity ==
Randon was blind and used a wheelchair from the early 2010s. In January 2021, she tested positive for SARS-CoV-2 in an outbreak at her retirement home. She was asymptomatic and tested negative days before her 117th birthday, making her the oldest known survivor of the COVID-19 pandemic.

After the death of Honorine Rondello on 19 October 2017, she became the oldest living person in France. When she turned 115 in 2019, Pope Francis sent her a personal letter and blessed rosary. In 2021, she said she was happy at her home, although she wished to join her grandparents and brother André in heaven.

On her 118th birthday in February 2022, Randon received a birthday note from the French president, Emmanuel Macron. On 19 April 2022, she became the world's oldest verified living person after the death of Kane Tanaka. She felt this was a "sad honour", saying: "I feel I would be better off in heaven, but the good Lord doesn't want me yet." At that time, she was reported to still eat chocolate and drink a glass of wine each day.

Randon died in her sleep from natural causes at her nursing home on 17 January 2023 at the age of 118 years and 340 days as the fourth-oldest verified person ever. Following her death, Maria Branyas Morera became the world's oldest validated living person.

== See also ==
- List of French supercentenarians
- List of European supercentenarians
- Oldest people
