= Madeleine Dellamonica =

French egyptologist (born 1912)

- Born: Madeleine Fortin; 23 July 1912 (age 114 years, 117 days); Paris, France
- Known for: Oldest living person in France (since 10 February 2026)

Madeleine Dellamonica (née Fortin; born 23 July 1912) is a French supercentenarian, whose age has been confirmed by the Gerontology Research Group (GRG) and LongeviQuest (LQ). On 10 February 2026, following the death of Marie-Rose Tessier, she became the oldest living person in France. She is the third oldest living person in Europe and the seventh oldest living person in the world. Her age is 114 years, 117 days.

== Biography ==
Madeleine Fortin was born on 23 July 1912 in Paris, France, to Jean Fortin and Marguerite Moulinet. She attended the Janné secondary school in Le Vesinet, and then studied egyptology at the Ecole du Louvre.

On 25 April 1933, she married Rodolphe Dellamonica; they lived together for 58 years until his death on 7 January 1992. Dellamonica has been a member of the French Society of Egyptology since 1993.

She celebrated her 100th birthday in 2012 with two school friends: Lucie Desmoulins and Jeanne Papis. She resides in Le Vésinet, France.

== See also ==
- List of French supercentenarians
- List of oldest living people
- List of the verified oldest people
