= Christian Mortensen =

Danish supercentenarian and second-longest-lived man (1882–1998)

- Born: Thomas Peter Thorvald Kristian Ferdinand Mortensen; August 16, 1882; Skårup, Denmark
- Died: April 25, 1998 (aged 115 years, 252 days); San Rafael, California, U.S.
- Known for: First verifiable male to achieve the ages of 114 and 115; Second-oldest verifiable male ever; Oldest Danish and Nordic person ever; Oldest American man ever; Oldest living man (August 18, 1994 – April 25, 1998)

Thomas Peter Thorvald Kristian Ferdinand Mortensen (August 16, 1882 – April 25, 1998), known as Christian Mortensen, was a Danish-American supercentenarian who resided in California. When he died, his age of 115 years and 252 days was the longest verified male lifespan at the time, until Jiroemon Kimura surpassed him in 2012. Mortensen was baptized in Fruering Church on December 26, 1882. Besides his baptismal record, other records include the 1890 and 1901 census enumerations in Denmark, and church confirmation in 1896.

== Biography ==
Christian Mortensen was born to tailor Jens Karl Martinus Mortensen and his wife Maren Therkelsen Thybo in the village of Skårup in Fruering parish, near the city of Skanderborg, Denmark, on August 16, 1882. He began work as a tailor's apprentice in Skanderborg at age 16 in 1898, and later took work as a farmhand.

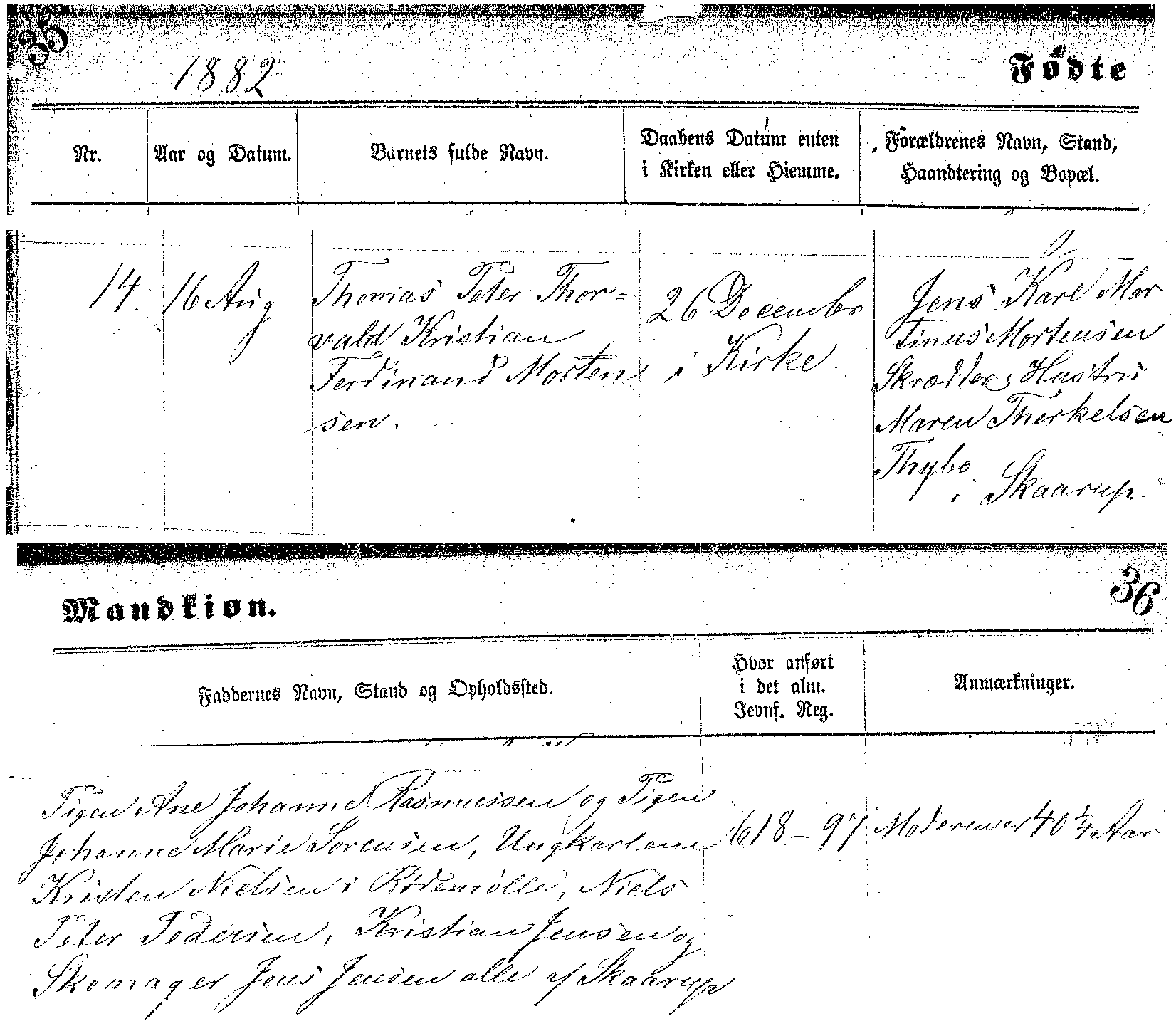
Birth record

Mortensen emigrated to Ellis Island in the New York Bay area, United States in 1903, then aged about 20 or 21 years old. He traveled while working as a tailor, but settled in Chicago, where he had relatives. Mortensen worked various trades, including as a milkman for Borden Dairy Company, as a restaurateur, and as a factory worker for the Continental Can Company.

He was married for less than ten years, divorced and had no children. He did not remarry.

In 1950, Mortensen retired near Galveston Bay, Texas. At the age of 96, he moved into Aldersly, a retirement community for Danish immigrants in San Rafael, California. Mortensen claimed he rode his bicycle to the retirement home, telling the staff that he was there to stay. Mortensen lived at Aldersly for almost 20 years until his death in 1998.

Mortensen was visited by American scientist James Vaupel and other longevity researchers on the occasion of his 113th birthday. He was particularly pleased with a box of Danish cigars that the researchers had brought him. Mortensen was completely blind towards the end of his life and spent much of his time in bed sleeping or in a wheelchair listening to the radio. He showed no signs of major degenerative disease or dementia. His memory and reasoning were described as largely intact. He could walk only with assistance.

== Lifestyle ==
Mortensen enjoyed cigars in moderation and drank lots of water. He led a simple and solitary life. He avoided red meat but was not a vegetarian. On his 115th birthday, Mortensen gave his advice for a long life: "Friends, a good cigar, drinking lots of good water, no alcohol, staying positive and lots of singing will keep you alive for a long time."

== See also ==
- Oldest people
- List of the oldest people by country
- List of the verified oldest people
- List of supercentenarians in the Nordic countries
- List of American supercentenarians
- List of Danish supercentenarians
- Shigechiyo Izumi, once believed verified to have reached age 120
