= List of centenarians (philosophers and theologians) =

The following is a list of centenarians – specifically, people who became famous as philosophers and theologians – known for reasons other than their longevity. For more lists, see Lists of centenarians.

Name	Lifespan	Age	Reason for Notability
Hans Albert	1921–2023	102	German philosopher
Ruth Nanda Anshen	1900–2003	103	American philosopher, author and editor
Harry Blamires	1916–2017	101	English Anglican theologian and literary critic
Mario Bunge	1919–2020	100	Argentinian-born Canadian philosopher of science
Konstantinos Despotopoulos	1913–2016	102	Greek philosopher
Gillo Dorfles	1910–2018	107	Italian philosopher, artist and art critic
Hans-Georg Gadamer	1900–2002	102	German philosopher
Sir Lloyd Geering	1918–2026	108	New Zealand theologian
Errol Harris	1908–2009	101	South African philosopher and author
Charles Hartshorne	1897–2000	103	American pioneer of process theology
Karl Holzamer	1906–2007	100	German philosopher and director general of ZDF
Benoît Lacroix	1915–2016	100	Canadian theologian and philosopher
Francisco Miró Quesada Cantuarias	1918–2019	100	Peruvian philosopher and professor
Sir William Mitchell	1861–1962	101	Australian philosopher, professor and author
Edgar Morin	1921–2026	104	French philosopher and sociologist
Teodor Oizerman	1914–2017	102	Soviet and Russian philosopher and academician
Alfred Vaucher	1887–1993	106	French theologian and church historian
Paul Weiss	1901–2002	101	American philosopher
