= Aarne Arvonen =

Finnish supercentenarian (1897–2009)

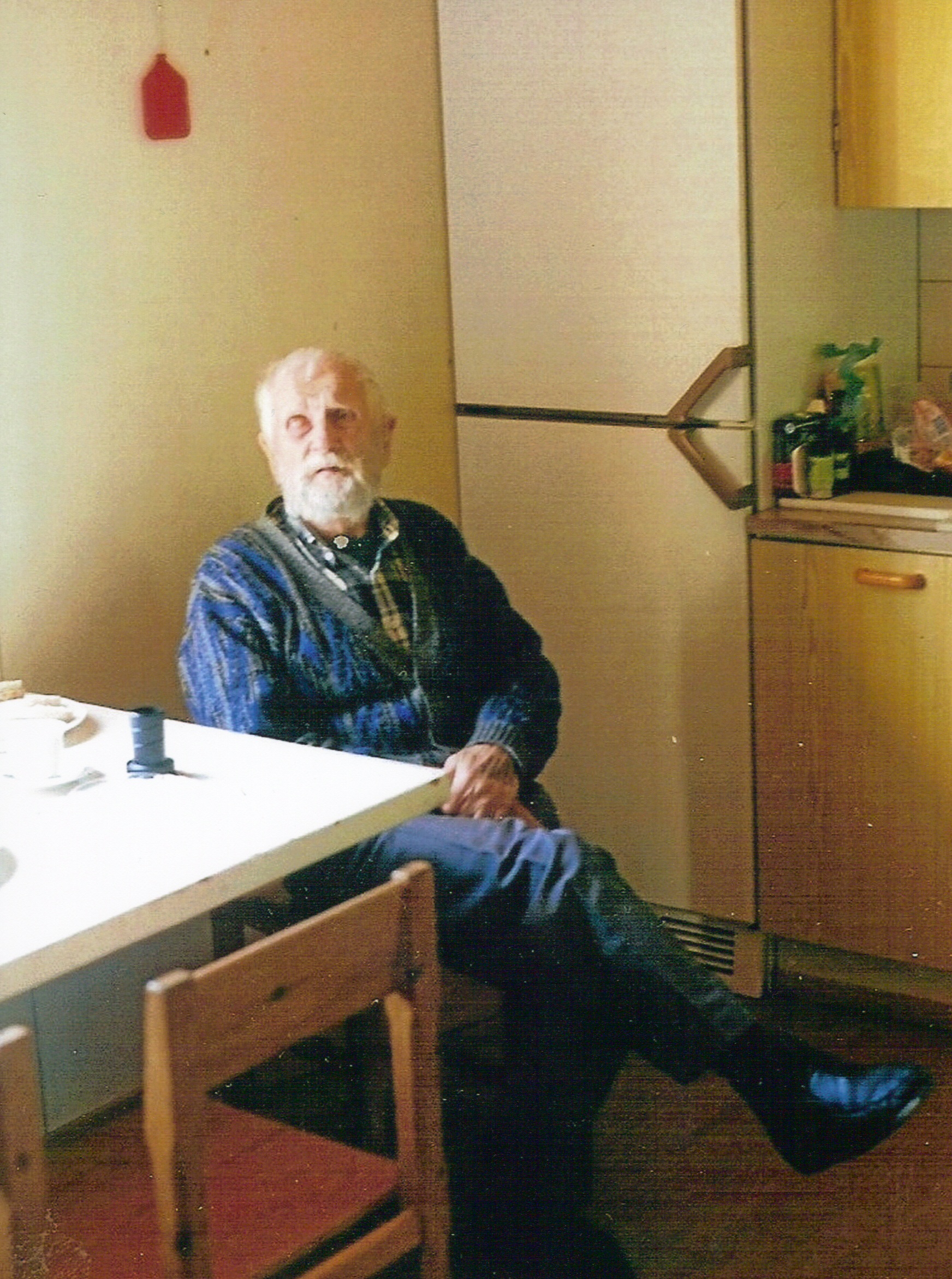
- Aarne Arvonen in 2006
- Born: 4 August 1897; Helsinki, Grand Duchy of Finland
- Died: 1 January 2009 (aged 111 years, 150 days); Järvenpää, Finland
- Military career
- Allegiance: Finland
- Branch: Red Guards
- Service years: 1918
- Conflicts: Finnish Civil War

Aarne Armas "Arska" Arvonen (4 August 1897 – 1 January 2009) was, at age 111 years, 150 days, a Finnish supercentenarian. He was born at a time when Finland was still an autonomous part of the Russian Empire. Arvonen was the last known living Finnish person to have been born in the 1800s.

== Biography ==
Aarne Arvonen was born in Helsinki and was the last surviving veteran of the Finnish Civil War of 1918 having served for the Red Guard. After the Civil War he spent a year at the Tammisaari prison camp. Arvonen later lived in Kallio, Helsinki, and had two daughters, Irma and Paula, with his wife Sylvi Emilia Salonen. At this time Arvonen was a smoker. His wife died in 1938, and that year he moved to Järvenpää, where he eventually lived in the Vanhankylänniemi rest home. In the summer of 2005, Arvonen was still living in a house he had built himself. Soon afterwards, however, he was hospitalized due to nephritis. He recovered from the inflammation, and his health was good still in 2008, but he had lost his sight and needed a hearing aid.

He was interested in astronomy from his childhood, and in 1921 he became a founding member of the Finnish amateur astronomy association Ursa. His membership lasted nearly 87 years. He visited London during his centenary celebrations in 1997, and celebrated his 111th birthday in 2008 with his family, but skipped his yearly trip to the local McArthur pub, making it a low key affair.

Arvonen died in Järvenpää on 1 January 2009, at the age of 111 years and 150 days.

== See also ==
- List of Finnish supercentenarians
- List of the verified oldest men
- List of last surviving World War I veterans
