= L. Stephen Coles =

Co-founder and executive director of the Gerontology Research Group (1941–2014)

- Born: Leslie Stephen Coles; January 19, 1941; New York City, U.S.
- Died: December 3, 2014 (aged 73); Scottsdale, Arizona, U.S.
- Education: Rensselaer Polytechnic Institute, B.S. Carnegie Mellon University, Ph.D. Stanford University School of Medicine, M.D.
- Occupation: Biogerontologist
- Known for: Cofounder and Executive Director of Gerontology Research Group

Leslie Stephen Coles (January 19, 1941 – December 3, 2014) was an American biogerontologist who was the co-founder and executive director of the Gerontology Research Group where he conducted research on supercentenarians and aging. He was also a visiting scholar in the computer science department at the University of California, Los Angeles and an assistant researcher in the Department of Surgery, at the David Geffen School of Medicine.

== Biography ==
Coles was born on January 19, 1941, in New York City. He received his B.S. in electrical engineering from Rensselaer Polytechnic Institute in Troy, New York, his Master's in mathematics from the Carnegie Institute of Technology, and his Ph.D. in systems and communication sciences from Carnegie Mellon University. After obtaining his M.D. at Stanford University School of Medicine, Coles completed his clinical internship in obstetrics and gynaecology at the Jackson Memorial Hospital of the Miller School of Medicine at the University of Miami.

Coles was treasurer of the Supercentenarian Research Foundation, as well as co-founder and system administrator of the Gerontology Research Group.

Coles died on December 3, 2014, in Scottsdale, Arizona, of pancreatic cancer. His brain was cryonically preserved by Alcor Life Extension Foundation as their 131st patient.

== Selected publications ==
=== Journal articles ===
- Coles LS (2005). "Validated worldwide supercentenarians for 2004". Rejuvenation Research. 8 (1): 69–71. doi:10.1089/rej.2005.8.69. PMID 15798378.
- Coles LS (June 2004). "Demography of human supercentenarians". The Journals of Gerontology. Series A, Biological Sciences and Medical Sciences. 59 (6): B579–86. doi:10.1093/gerona/59.6.B579. PMID 15215268.

=== Books ===
- L. Stephen Coles (2011) Extraordinary Healing: How the discoveries of Mirko Beljanski, the world's first green molecular biologist, can protect and restore your health. Freedom Press, Topanga, California; ISBN 9781893910898.
- L. Stephen Coles and David Steinman (1999) The IP-6 with Inositol Question and Answer Book: Nature's Ultimate Anti-Cancer Pill. Freedom Press, Topanga, California; ISBN 9781893910003
