= List of Swedish supercentenarians =

People from Sweden who have attained or surpassed the age of 110 years

Swedish supercentenarians are citizens, residents or emigrants from Sweden who have attained the age of at least 110 years. The Gerontology Research Group (GRG) has validated the age claims of 18 supercentenarians from Sweden (including 3 emigrants), the oldest of whom is Astrid Zachrison, who died the night after her 113th birthday (14 May 2008).

== Oldest Swedish people ever ==
Deceased Living

Rank	Name	Sex	Birth date	Death date	Age	Birthplace	Place of death or residence
1	Astrid Zachrison	F	15 May 1895	15 May 2008	113 years, 0 days	Kalmar	Jönköping
2	Agnes Boström	F	29 April 1912	16 November 2024	112 years, 201 days	Västernorrland	Västernorrland
3	Gunborg Hancock	F	20 April 1912	16 October 2024	112 years, 179 days	Finland (Note: Hancock was born in Helsinki, then part of the autonomous state Finland of the Russian Empire.)	Stockholm
4	Elsa Moberg	F	30 June 1889	20 November 2001	112 years, 143 days	Gothenburg and Bohus (Note: In 1998, Gothenburg and Borhus, Skaraborg, and Älvsborg were merged as Västra Götaland.)	Stockholm
5	Esther Ecklund	F	28 October 1901	12 March 2014	112 years, 135 days	Jönköping	United States
6	Hulda Johansson	F	24 February 1882	9 June 1994	112 years, 105 days	Gothenburg and Bohus	Gothenburg and Bohus
7	Flarid Lagerlund	F	8 February 1910	9 April 2022	112 years, 60 days	Stockholm	Stockholm
8	Carl Mattsson	M	9 March 1908	24 July 2019	111 years, 137 days	Gothenburg and Bohus	Västra Götaland
9	Anders Engberg	M	1 July 1892	6 November 2003	111 years, 128 days	Halland	Halland
10	Johanne Svensson	F	24 January 1892	29 May 2003	111 years, 125 days	Denmark	Skåne
11	Alice Östlund	F	8 December 1906	28 March 2018	111 years, 110 days	Gävleborg	Västra Götaland
12	Wilhelmine Sande	F	24 October 1874	21 January 1986	111 years, 89 days	Norway (Note: Sande was born in Norway, then part of the Union between Sweden and Norway.)	Stockholm
13	Ejra Grimstam	F	29 June 1912	25 September 2023	111 years, 88 days	Älvsborg	Västra Götaland
14	Ruth Engström	F	23 September 1902	2 December 2013	111 years, 70 days	Kalmar	Stockholm
15	Birgit Johansson	F	9 December 1915	Living	110 years, 339 days	Gothenburg and Bohus	Västra Götaland
16	Conrad Johnson	M	19 January 1904	23 December 2014	110 years, 338 days	Skaraborg	United States
17	Nanny Halvardsson	F	2 July 1906	26 May 2017	110 years, 328 days	Värmland	Stockholm
18	Hulda Källberg	F	16 January 1911	18 November 2021	110 years, 306 days	Kopparberg (Note: In 1997, Kopparberg was renamed as Dalarna.)	Dalarna
19	Maria Eriksson	F	27 March 1900	10 January 2011	110 years, 289 days	Uppsala	Uppsala
20	Jenny Karlsson	F	17 October 1891	13 July 2002	110 years, 269 days	Västmanland	Västmanland
21	Teresia Lindahl	F	10 June 1888	2 March 1999	110 years, 265 days	Kronoberg	Jönköping
22	Agnes Sultan	F	15 December 1889	4 September 2000	110 years, 264 days	Västerbotten	United States
23	Olga Nyman	F	6 April 1886	15 December 1996	110 years, 253 days	Västernorrland	Canada
24	Signe Lundqvist	F	9 February 1910	23 September 2020	110 years, 227 days	Uppsala	Uppsala
25	Dagmar Karlsson	F	26 April 1916	Living	110 years, 201 days	Halland	Halland
26	Dagny Olsson	F	14 May 1916	Living	110 years, 183 days	Jämtland	Västerbotten
27	Elvira Larsson	F	27 July 1908	16 January 2019	110 years, 173 days	Gävleborg	Gävleborg
28	Ellen Johansson	F	23 January 1887	6 July 1997	110 years, 164 days	Malmöhus (Note: In 1997, Malmöhus and Kristianstad were merged as Skåne.)	Skåne
29	Elin Karlsson	F	21 April 1900	27 September 2010	110 years, 159 days	Gothenburg and Bohus	Västra Götaland
30	Märta Mattsson	F	20 September 1906	18 February 2017	110 years, 151 days	Västernorrland	Västernorrland
31	Annie Sjöström	F	19 December 1914	23 April 2025	110 years, 125 days	Kalmar	Kalmar
32	Hanna Eriksson	F	26 February 1891	26 June 2001	110 years, 120 days	Kopparberg	Östergötland
33	Sanny Mattsson	F	17 February 1914	6 June 2024	110 years, 110 days	Västerbotten	Stockholm
34	Hulda Carlsson	F	2 February 1898	22 April 2008	110 years, 80 days	Halland	Västra Götaland
35	Hertha Åkerlind	F	28 April 1908	10 July 2018	110 years, 73 days	Örebro	Stockholm
36	Olga Johnson	F	31 August 1889	31 October 1999	110 years, 61 days	Östergötland	United States
37	Gulli Bergendahl	F	10 December 1904	3 February 2015	110 years, 55 days	Gothenburg and Bohus	Västra Götaland
38	Anna Silverdahl	F	30 April 1891	24 May 2001	110 years, 24 days	Jämtland	United States
39	Gerda Morton	F	11 January 1890	29 January 2000	110 years, 18 days	Malmöhus	United States
40	Hilda Grahn	F	10 June 1888	24 June 1998	110 years, 14 days	Malmöhus	Skåne
41	Karin Larsson	F	17 May 1904	24 May 2014	110 years, 7 days	Örebro	Örebro
41	Ingrid Svensson	F	23 February 1912	2 March 2022	110 years, 7 days	Jönköping	Jönköping
43	Lydia Åslund	F	14 November 1902	19 November 2012	110 years, 5 days	Västmanland	Stockholm

== See also ==
- List of supercentenarians in the Nordic countries
