= List of Belgian supercentenarians =

People from Belgium who have attained or surpassed the age of 110 years

Belgian supercentenarians are citizens, residents or emigrants from Belgium who have attained or surpassed 110 years of age. The Gerontology Research Group (GRG) has validated the longevity claims of 20 Belgian supercentenarians, including 18 residents and 2 emigrants.

The oldest known Belgian person was Joanna Deroover, who died in 2002 aged 112 years 186 days. The oldest Belgian man ever was Jan Machiel Reyskens, who lived 111 years and 241 days from 1878 to 1990.

== Oldest Belgian people ever ==
Deceased Living

Rank	Name	Sex	Birth Date	Death Date	Age	Birthplace	Place of Death or Residence
1	Joanna Deroover	F	3 June 1890	6 December 2002	112 years, 186 days	Flemish Brabant	Flemish Brabant
1	Yvonne Francier	F	28 February 1913	2 September 2025	112 years, 186 days	Brussels	France
3	Fanny Godin	F	27 May 1902	7 September 2014	112 years, 103 days	Liège	Flemish Brabant
4	Alicia Corveleyn	F	8 January 1905	31 January 2017	112 years, 23 days	West Flanders	West Flanders
5	Julia Van Hool	F	7 May 1909	29 April 2021	111 years, 357 days	Antwerp	Antwerp
6	Elisabeth De Proost	F	5 February 1908	25 January 2020	111 years, 354 days	Brussels	Brussels
7	Adele Rodenstein	F	3 September 1908	18 July 2020	111 years, 319 days	Liège (Note: Rodenstein and Wolf were born in what is today the Eupen-Malmedy region, this area was at the time of their births part of the German Empire.)	Germany
8	Maria Richard	F	28 November 1900	11 October 2012	111 years, 318 days	Luxembourg	France
9	Jan Machiel Reyskens	M	11 May 1878	7 January 1990	111 years, 241 days	Limburg	Netherlands
10	Marcelle Lévaz	F	18 March 1911	13 November 2022	111 years, 240 days	Liège	Liège
11	Germaine Degueldre	F	26 September 1900	11 May 2012	111 years, 228 days	Hainaut	Hainaut
12	Marietta Bouverne	F	25 December 1908	3 August 2020	111 years, 222 days	East Flanders	East Flanders
13	Adrienne Ledent	F	13 December 1899	23 June 2011	111 years, 192 days	Luxembourg	Luxembourg
14	Magda Janssens	F	16 March 1912	18 September 2023	111 years, 186 days	Antwerp	Antwerp
15	Jan Goossenaerts	M	30 October 1900	21 March 2012	111 years, 143 days	Antwerp	Antwerp
16	Anne de Sousberghe	F	7 November 1904	12 February 2016	111 years, 97 days	Brussels	England, UK
17	Mariette Barszczewicz	F	8 January 1909	4 April 2020	111 years, 87 days	Liège	Canada
18	Maria van Sprengel	F	30 January 1882	22 April 1993	111 years, 82 days	Antwerp	Antwerp
19	Renee Tardy	F	18 January 1910	21 February 2021	111 years, 34 days	Hainaut	Brussels
20	Bernardina van Dommelen	F	15 March 1899	16 April 2010	111 years, 32 days	Antwerp	Antwerp
21	Fernande Everaert-De Raeve	F	3 December 1906	6 December 2017	111 years, 3 days	East Flanders	East Flanders
22	Anna De Guchtenaere	F	10 April 1904	6 April 2015	110 years, 361 days	East Flanders	East Flanders
23	Madeleine Dullier	F	30 April 1907	20 April 2018	110 years, 355 days	Hainaut	Hainaut
24	Aimée Rensonnet	F	18 January 1900	15 December 2010	110 years, 331 days	Brussels	Hainaut
25	Gabrielle Mélard	F	31 July 1909	25 June 2020	110 years, 330 days	Brussels	Brussels
26	Romanie Pollet	F	21 December 1898	17 October 2009	110 years, 300 days	West Flanders	Brussels
27	Anne-Marie Vandermersch	F	14 December 1892	8 October 2003	110 years, 298 days	Namur	Brussels
28	Bertha Noë	F	22 March 1911	27 November 2021	110 years, 250 days	Flemish Brabant	Flemish Brabant
29	Gabriëlle Demets	F	26 August 1899	1 May 2010	110 years, 248 days	West Flanders	West Flanders
30	Lazarie Maes	F	24 July 1910	25 March 2021	110 years, 244 days	West Flanders	West Flanders
31	José Van Zandijcke	M	5 June 1912	28 December 2022	110 years, 206 days	Antwerp	France
32	Denise Waelbers	F	26 September 1915	16 April 2026	110 years, 202 days	Limburg	Antwerp
33	Eva Philippet	F	18 October 1905	6 May 2016	110 years, 201 days	Hainaut	Hainaut
34	Maria Pierson-Ledent	F	20 June 1899	6 January 2010	110 years, 200 days	Luxembourg	Namur
35	Jeanne Vandenplas	F	27 June 1916	Living	110 years, 148 days	Flemish Brabant	Flemish Brabant
36	Maria Irma Casteur-Vanderhaegen	F	26 June 1887	11 November 1997	110 years, 138 days	East Flanders	East Flanders
37	Martha Wolf	F	1 September 1904	18 December 2014	110 years, 108 days	Liège	Germany
38	Maria de Jaeger	F	15 January 1901	30 April 2011	110 years, 105 days	East Flanders	East Flanders
39	Catharina Ververs	F	27 October 1888	24 January 1999	110 years, 89 days	Flemish Brabant	Flemish Brabant
40	Louis Marion	M	10 October 1893	28 December 2003	110 years, 79 days	Namur	Namur
41	Rachel Neyt	F	14 June 1909	14 August 2019	110 years, 61 days	West Flanders	West Flanders
42	Elisabeth Vermont	F	12 October 1916	Living	110 years, 41 days	West Flanders	West Flanders
43	Jeanne Pirenne-Lempereur	F	8 April 1904	18 May 2014	110 years, 40 days	Liège	Liège
44	Marie de Ruyver	F	10 February 1889	14 March 1999	110 years, 32 days	East Flanders	East Flanders
45	Felicitas Van Oudenhove	F	6 December 1908	1 January 2019	110 years, 26 days	East Flanders	East Flanders
