= List of Danish supercentenarians =

People from Denmark who have attained or surpassed the age of 110 years

This list comprises Danish supercentenarians (people from Denmark who have attained the age of at least 110 years), according to the Gerontology Research Group (GRG). The oldest Dane is Christian Mortensen, who emigrated to the United States in 1903, where he died on 25 April 1998, aged 115 years, 252 days. The oldest person to be born and reside in Denmark is Kirsten Schwalbe, who is currently living at the age of 112 years, 218 days.

== Danish supercentenarians ==
Deceased Living

Rank	Name	Sex	Birth date	Death date	Age	Birthplace	Place of death or residence
1	Christian Mortensen	M	16 August 1882	25 April 1998	115 years, 252 days	Central Jutland	United States
2	Ursula Krigger	F	22 April 1902	10 September 2015	113 years, 141 days	Danish West Indies	U.S. Virgin Islands (Note: Denmark sold its Caribbean islands to the United States in 1917.)
3	Kirsten Schwalbe	F	10 March 1914	Living	112 years, 218 days	Central Jutland	Central Jutland
4	Karla Lindholm Jensen	F	7 May 1908	10 December 2020	112 years, 217 days	Central Jutland	Central Jutland
5	Ellen Brandenborg	F	7 January 1906	22 July 2017	111 years, 196 days	North Jutland	Central Jutland
6	Johanne Svensson	F	24 January 1892	29 May 2003	111 years, 125 days	Central Jutland	Sweden
7	Anne Matthiesen	F	26 November 1884	19 March 1996	111 years, 114 days	North Schleswig, Prussia	South Denmark (Note: Southern Jutland was conquered by Prussia in 1864 and its northern part was reunited with Denmark in 1920.)
8	Karen Jespersen	F	5 May 1889	4 August 2000	111 years, 91 days	Central Jutland	Central Jutland
9	Anna Nielsen	F	2 April 1904	19 June 2015	111 years, 78 days	North Jutland	Canada
10	Karen Egestad	F	14 September 1908	16 May 2019	110 years, 244 days	Central Jutland	Central Jutland
11	Marie Jensen	F	5 June 1904	30 January 2015	110 years, 239 days	Central Jutland	Central Jutland
12	Karen Rigmor Moritz	F	15 August 1913	4 April 2024	110 years, 233 days	North Jutland	North Jutland
13	Bertha Wallin	F	13 January 1874	5 August 1984	110 years, 205 days	Central Jutland	United States
14	Signe Højer	F	1 November 1905	18 March 2016	110 years, 138 days	North Jutland	Central Jutland
15	Agnes Steenstrup	F	24 November 1903	1 March 2014	110 years, 97 days	Capital Region	Capital Region
16	Jens Peter Westergaard	M	26 April 1914	23 July 2024	110 years, 88 days	South Denmark	South Denmark
17	Gerda Muff	F	16 March 1906	29 April 2016	110 years, 44 days	Capital Region	Capital Region
18	Ulla Lund	F	25 July 1907	23 August 2017	110 years, 29 days	Central Jutland	United States
