= List of Spanish supercentenarians =

People from Spain who have attained or surpassed the age of 110 years

Spanish supercentenarians are citizens, residents or emigrants from Spain who have attained or surpassed 110 years of age. As of January 2015, the Gerontology Research Group (GRG) had validated the longevity claims of 45 Spanish supercentenarians, including 42 residents and 3 emigrants. More supercentenarians were identified by other studies and by news reports. As of 22 November 2026, the oldest living Spaniard is Teresa Fernandez Casado born in Castile and León, aged 113 years, 116 days. The oldest verified Spanish person ever is Maria Branyas who emigrated from the United States in 1915 and died in Olot, Catalonia on 19 August 2024 at the age of 117 years, 168 days.

== 100 oldest known Spaniards ==
Deceased Living

Rank	Name	Sex	Birth date	Death date	Age	Birthplace	Place of death or residence
1	Maria Branyas Morera	F	4 March 1907	19 August 2024	117 years, 168 days	United States	Catalonia
2	Ana María Vela Rubio	F	29 October 1901	15 December 2017	116 years, 47 days	Andalusia	Catalonia
3	Magdalena Oliver Gabarró	F	31 October 1903	1 May 2019	115 years, 182 days	Catalonia	Catalonia
4	Emiliano Mercado del Toro	M	21 August 1891	24 January 2007	115 years, 156 days	Puerto Rico (Note: Mercado del Toro, Iglesias Jordan, Collado Ramos, Carrasquillo, Colón Aponte, Dearroyo, Reyes Ortiz, Hernández De Ramos, Caballero and Ramos Gonzales were born in Puerto Rico, then part of the Captaincy General of Puerto Rico, now an unincorporated territory of the United States.)	Puerto Rico
5	Ramona Trinidad Iglesias Jordan	F	1 September 1889	29 May 2004	114 years, 271 days	Puerto Rico	Puerto Rico
6	María Antonia Castro	F	10 June 1881	16 January 1996	114 years, 220 days	Andalusia	Andalusia
7	María del Carmen López	F	3 April 1883	3 July 1997	114 years, 91 days	Murcia	Murcia
8	Silveria Martín Díaz	F	20 June 1910	11 September 2024	114 years, 83 days	Extremadura	Extremadura
9	Joan Riudavets	M	15 December 1889	5 March 2004	114 years, 81 days	Balearic Islands	Balearic Islands
10	Juliana Teodora Artola Ondarra	F	22 April 1911	28 January 2025	113 years, 281 days	Basque Country	Basque Country
11	María del Carmen Figueiró	F	28 October 1883	25 May 1997	113 years, 209 days	Galicia	Galicia
12	Manuela Fernández Fojaco	F	18 June 1895	6 January 2009	113 years, 202 days	Asturias	Asturias
13	Juana “Jeanne” Lara	F	1 April 1906	16 October 2019	113 years, 198 days	Valencia	France
14	Teresa Fernandez Casado	F	29 July 1913	Living	113 years, 116 days	Castile and León	Castile and León
15	Josefa Santos Gonzalez	F	7 September 1906	22 December 2019	113 years, 106 days	Extremadura	Madrid
16	Felicidad Hernández Corredera	F	11 August 1913	Living	113 years, 103 days	Castile and León	Castile and León
17	Francisco Núñez Olivera	M	13 December 1904	29 January 2018	113 years, 47 days	Extremadura	Extremadura
18	Cristina Collado Ramos	F	6 November 1885	22 November 1998	113 years, 16 days	Puerto Rico	United States
19	Avelina Mouzo Leis	F	27 December 1904	28 December 2017	113 years, 1 day	Galicia	Galicia
20	Saturnino de la Fuente García	M	11 February 1909	18 January 2022	112 years, 341 days	Castile and León	Castile and León
21	María Concha Pérez Cidad	F	9 December 1901	30 September 2014	112 years, 295 days	Castile and León	Madrid
22	Virtudes Tomás Navarro	F	17 July 1907	20 April 2020	112 years, 278 days	Valencia	Valencia
23	Angelina Torres Vallbona	F	18 March 1913	11 November 2025	112 years, 238 days	Catalonia	Catalonia
24	Josefa Salas Mateo	F	14 July 1860	27 February 1973	112 years, 228 days	Andalusia	Andalusia
25	Teodora Cea Bermejo	F	1 April 1912	31 October 2024	112 years, 213 days	Madrid	Madrid
26	Modesta Rodríguez Carrasquillo	F	16 June 1890	12 January 2003	112 years, 210 days	Puerto Rico	Puerto Rico
27	Obdulia Carpena Gascón	F	29 November 1910	19 June 2023	112 years, 202 days	Murcia	Murcia
28	María Anastasia Colón Aponte	F	27 April 1891	28 October 2003	112 years, 184 days	Puerto Rico	Puerto Rico
29	José Armengol Jover	M	23 July 1881	20 January 1994	112 years, 181 days	Catalonia	Catalonia
30	María Esperanza Onieva	F	1 September 1889	15 February 2002	112 years, 167 days	Andalusia	Andalusia
31	Francisca García Torres	F	13 September 1901	25 February 2014	112 years, 165 days	Andalusia	Navarre
32	Josefa Llovet Llovet	F	25 February 1867	29 June 1979	112 years, 124 days	Catalonia	Catalonia
33	Salustiano Sanchez	M	8 June 1901	13 September 2013	112 years, 97 days	Castile and León	United States
34	Carme Noguera Falguera	F	22 August 1914	Living	112 years, 92 days	Catalonia	Catalonia
35	Brigida Dearroyo	F	7 October 1888	31 December 2000	112 years, 85 days	Puerto Rico	United States
36	Valentina Martín Giménez	F	14 February 1908	13 April 2020	112 years, 59 days	Castile and León	Madrid
37	Adelaida González Alonso	F	23 October 1902	20 November 2014	112 years, 28 days	Castile and León	Castile and León
38	Josefa San Roman Mateos	F	1 January 1910	25 January 2022	112 years, 24 days	Castile and León	Castile and León
39	Teresa Dosaigues Abella	F	13 February 1898	25 February 2010	112 years, 12 days	Catalonia	Catalonia
40	Berthe Budet	F	3 October 1909	10 October 2021	112 years, 7 days	Valencia	France
41	Maria Garcia	F	29 April 1908	15 April 2020	111 years, 352 days	Galicia	United States
42	Avelina Lorenzo Berian	F	11 November 1911	23 October 2023	111 years, 346 days	Castile and León	Castile and León
43	E.M.M.	F	20 July 1885	21 June 1997	111 years, 336 days	Andalusia	Andalusia
44	Concepcion Caselles Serra	F	18 November 1909	16 October 2021	111 years, 332 days	Catalonia	Catalonia
45	Vicenta Prieto Santos	F	22 January 1909	2 December 2020	111 years, 315 days	Castile and León	Castile and León
46	Consuelo Moreno-López	F	5 February 1893	13 November 2004	111 years, 282 days	Morocco (then Spanish)	United States
47	Ángeles de la Fuente Campo	F	24 March 1912	28 December 2023	111 years, 279 days	Castile and León	Castile and León
48	Agustín Reyes Ortiz	M	8 February 1887	6 November 1998	111 years, 271 days	Puerto Rico	Puerto Rico
49	Antonio Urrea Hernández	M	18 February 1888	15 November 1999	111 years, 270 days	Murcia	Catalonia
49	Maria Luisa Vázquez de Silva	F	29 March 1910	24 December 2021	111 years, 270 days	Galicia	Galicia
51	María de la O Soria Berbel	F	9 April 1898	23 December 2009	111 years, 258 days	Andalusia	Andalusia
51	Luis Carrasco-Muñoz y Pérez de la Isla	M	13 February 1914	29 October 2025	111 years, 258 days	Madrid	Madrid
53	Andresa Guerrero-Ortiz	F	30 November 1898	5 August 2010	111 years, 248 days	Aragon	Aragon
54	Jesús Mosteo	M	1 January 1908	28 August 2019	111 years, 239 days	Aragon	Aragon
55	Emilia Hernández de Ramos	F	9 June 1889	26 January 2001	111 years, 231 days	Puerto Rico	Puerto Rico
56	Carmen Romero	F	27 August 1895	8 April 2007	111 years, 224 days	Andalusia	Andalusia
57	Mercedes Cebrian Asin	F	3 April 1912	9 November 2023	111 years, 220 days	Madrid	Madrid
58	E.E.A.	F	18 August 1890	25 March 2002	111 years, 219 days	Castile and León	Castile and León
59	Josefa Álvarez Rodríguez	F	16 February 1906	19 September 2017	111 years, 215 days	Galicia	Galicia
60	Carmen Gómez González	F	23 January 1905	20 August 2016	111 years, 210 days	Cantabria	Castile and León
61	Julia Bascunana Herrada	F	7 February 1911	31 July 2022	111 years, 174 days	Castilla–La Mancha	Valencia
62	Jesús Redondo Bermejo	M	2 June 1915	Living	111 years, 173 days	Extremadura	Extremadura
63	Crescencia Galán Medina	F	13 October 1914	3 March 2026	111 years, 141 days	Castilla–La Mancha	Castilla–La Mancha
64	Angeles Alava Jimenez	F	3 August 1910	21 December 2021	111 years, 140 days	Navarre	Navarre
65	Pedro Zorrilla Caballero	M	24 April 1886	2 September 1997	111 years, 131 days	Puerto Rico	Puerto Rico
66	Antonia Díaz García	F	11 May 1870	13 September 1981	111 years, 125 days	Andalusia	Andalusia
67	Teresa Velazquez Andres	F	13 July 1909	8 November 2020	111 years, 118 days	Valencia	Valencia
68	Dolores Subirana	F	18 July 1897	9 November 2008	111 years, 114 days	Catalonia	Catalonia
68	Luciana Merino Larmet	F	6 December 1909	30 March 2021	111 years, 114 days	Andalusia	Andalusia
70	María Cruz Martínez	F	3 May 1911	24 August 2022	111 years, 113 days	Navarre	Navarre
71	Eulalia Hernández	F	28 July 1891	16 November 2002	111 years, 111 days	Andalusia	Madrid
72	Manolita Piña	F	24 February 1883	11 June 1994	111 years, 107 days	Catalonia	Uruguay
72	Remedios Company Ventura	F	10 February 1903	28 May 2014	111 years, 107 days	Catalonia	Catalonia
74	Mercedes Ribera Sanz	F	1 December 1914	13 March 2026	111 years, 102 days	Catalonia	Catalonia
75	Filomena Arán	F	4 May 1888	9 August 1999	111 years, 97 days	Catalonia	Catalonia
76	Petronila Ramos Gonzales	F	20 December 1882	9 March 1994	111 years, 79 days	Puerto Rico	Puerto Rico
76	Aurelia Rodríguez Gutiérrez	F	30 May 1892	17 August 2003	111 years, 79 days	Cantabria	Madrid
76	Inocencia Zofio Cajal	F	1 May 1910	19 July 2021	111 years, 79 days	Extremadura	Madrid
79	Adelaida Gonzalez Hernandez	F	13 April 1907	23 June 2018	111 years, 71 days	Castile and León	Castile and León
80	Dolores Moret Ferriol	F	10 January 1907	17 March 2018	111 years, 66 days	Catalonia	Catalonia
81	Pilar Prieto Rubio	F	29 November 1903	27 January 2015	111 years, 59 days	Basque Country	Castile and León
82	Lucía Madaria Vesga	F	13 December 1894	2 February 2006	111 years, 51 days	Castile and León	Andalusia
83	Francisco Fernández Fernández	M	24 July 1901	7 September 2012	111 years, 45 days	Castile and León	Castile and León
84	Josefa Aragonés Mayoral	F	5 October 1911	17 November 2022	111 years, 43 days	Catalonia	Catalonia
85	Celestina Penabad	F	2 August 1907	13 September 2018	111 years, 42 days	Galicia	Galicia
86	Francisca Barracel	F	18 June 1902	18 July 2013	111 years, 30 days	Galicia	Galicia
87	Generosa Sales Ferreres	F	4 January 1907	27 January 2018	111 years, 23 days	Valencia	Catalonia
88	A.P.L.	F	26 March 1884	12 April 1995	111 years, 17 days	Castile and León	Castile and León
89	Teresa Gauchía Simó	F	15 May 1906	25 May 2017	111 years, 10 days	Valencia	Valencia
90	Daniela Lopez de Lacalle	F	11 December 1909	13 December 2020	111 years, 2 days	Basque Country	Basque Country
91	Irene Fernández Becares	F	15 March 1911	14 March 2022	110 years, 364 days	Castile and León	Valencia
92	Josefina Villaverde Fontenla	F	19 November 1909	7 November 2020	110 years, 354 days	Galicia	Galicia
93	Joaquim Illas	M	26 July 1909	13 July 2020	110 years, 353 days	Catalonia	Catalonia
94	Victoria de la Cruz Garcia	F	24 June 1907	4 June 2018	110 years, 345 days	Andalusia	Japan
95	Plazida Insausti Lekuona	F	5 October 1896	12 September 2007	110 years, 342 days	Basque Country	Basque Country
95	María Carmen Nouche Porro	F	15 September 1911	23 August 2022	110 years, 342 days	Galicia	Galicia
97	María Rodríguez Sánchez	F	24 January 1913	21 December 2023	110 years, 331 days	Andalusia	Andalusia
98	Ramona Agudín Fernández	F	9 March 1870	12 January 1981	110 years, 309 days	Asturias	Asturias
99	U. H. R.	F	19 June 1891	21 April 2002	110 years, 306 days	Castile and León	Castile and León
99	Concepcion Gonzalez	F	20 January 1916	Living	110 years, 306 days	Asturias	Madrid

== Biographies ==
=== Galo Leoz ===
Galo Leoz (22 April 1879 – 23 January 1990) was a Spanish professor of ophtalmology at the Complutense University of Madrid. He performed pioneering studies on the degeneration and regeneration of optical nerves, and on cornea transplants. He received the Spanish gold medal for work merit and was president of the Spanish Ophtalmological Society. He was considered the world's oldest doctor, as he kept working until the age of 103. Leoz was Spain's oldest known living person when he died aged 110 years 276 days. His record was surpassed in 1992 by Josep Armengol Jover (23 July 1881 – 20 January 1994), who lived 112 years and 181 days.

=== Joan Riudavets ===
Joan Riudavets Moll (15 December 1889 – 5 March 2004) was born in Es Migjorn Gran, Menorca, where he lived until his death in 2004. His mother, Catalina Moll Mercadés, died at age 25 in December 1889; his father was a cobbler. Riudavets also worked as a cobbler until he retired in 1954 and was a former village councillor of Es Migjorn Gran. Riudavets married in 1917; his wife, also born in 1889, died at age 90.

When asked, Riudavets attributed his longevity to a life of moderation.

Riudavets died at the age of 114 years, 81 days after having a cold for a few days. He was survived by two younger half-brothers: Pere, who died in 2006 at the age of 105, and Josep, who died in 2009 at the age of 102. At the time of his death, Riudavets was believed to be the oldest Spanish person ever. However, subsequent research by the International Database on Longevity has revealed that two women had been older than Riudavets at the time of their deaths. He became the oldest recognized living person in Europe following Maria Teresa Fumarola Ligorio's death on 14 May 2003, and oldest recognized living man in the world following Yukichi Chuganji's death on 28 September 2003. After Riudavets' death, Fred Harold Hale became the world's oldest man.

=== Ana María Vela Rubio ===
Ana María Vela Rubio (29 October 1901 – 15 December 2017) was born in Puente Genil, Andalusia. She worked as a dressmaker in her youth. She never married her partner as her parents objected to him, but the two had several children. Her daughter, also named Ana, lived with her. Rubio became the oldest verified Spaniard ever on 6 June 2016, when she surpassed the age of María Antonia Castro who had died in 1996, aged 114 years, 220 days. She became the oldest living European upon the death of Emma Morano on 15 April 2017. She went on to live to 116 years and 47 days.

=== Francisco Núñez Olivera ===
Francisco Núñez Olivera (13 December 1904 – 29 January 2018) was born and lived his whole life in the village of Bienvenida in the Badajoz province of Extremadura. He fought in the Rif War and the Spanish Civil War. He was nicknamed "Marchena" after his resemblance to flamenco singer-songwriter/actor Pepe Marchena. His wife died in 1988, and he survived his two sons. In his later years as a pensioner, he lived with his elder daughter María Antonia. Olivera had his kidney removed when he was 90 and a cataract operation aged 98; he was otherwise in good health. He became the oldest living man after the death of Israel Kristal on August 11, 2017. Olivera lived to 113 years and 47 days. At the time of his death, he was the last surviving Spanish veteran of the Rif War and the oldest veteran of the Spanish Army.

=== Saturnino de la Fuente García ===
Saturnino de la Fuente García (11 February 1909 – 18 January 2022) was born in León. At the age of nine, he caught the Spanish flu. A passionate football fan, he co-founded his neighborhood's local team in 1927. He married Antonina Barrio Gutiérrez in 1933 and they had eight children, one of whom died as a child. In 1936 he was not drafted in the Civil War because of his height (1.50 m). A skilled craftsman, he would go on to establish a shoemaking business, eventually being commissioned to make boots for the army.

He became the oldest verified living man on 12 August 2021, following the death of Emilio Flores Marquez of Puerto Rico. He had 7 daughters, 14 grandchildren and 22 great-grandchildren. Upon his death in January 2022 at the age of 112 years and 341 days, Venezuelan supercentenarian Juan Vicente Pérez became the world's oldest man.
