= List of French supercentenarians =

Marie Brémont (1886–2001) is the sixth-oldest Frenchwoman ever and was the world's oldest living person from November 2000 to June 2001. Pictured in 1910, aged 23–24.

French supercentenarians are citizens, residents or emigrants from France who have attained or surpassed 110 years of age. As of January 2015, the Gerontology Research Group (GRG) had validated the longevity claims of 161 French supercentenarians. France was home to the oldest human being ever whose longevity is well documented, Jeanne Calment, who lived in Arles for her entire life of 122 years and 164 days. The oldest verified Frenchman ever is Georges Thomas (1911–2024), who lived for 112 years and 195 days. As of 22 November 2026, the oldest known living French person is Madeleine Dellamonica, born 23 July 1912 and aged 114 years, 122 days.

== 100 oldest French people ever ==
Deceased Living

Rank	Name	Sex	Birth date	Death date	Age	Birthplace	Place of Death or Residence
1	Jeanne Calment	F	21 February 1875	4 August 1997	122 years, 164 days	Provence-Alpes-Cote d'Azur	Provence-Alpes-Cote d'Azur
2	Lucile Randon	F	11 February 1904	17 January 2023	118 years, 340 days	Occitanie	Provence-Alpes-Cote d'Azur
3	Jeanne Bot	F	14 January 1905	22 May 2021	116 years, 128 days	Occitanie	Occitanie
4	Marie-Rose Tessier	F	21 May 1910	10 February 2026	115 years, 265 days	Pays de la Loire	Pays de la Loire
5	Valentine Ligny	F	22 October 1906	4 January 2022	115 years, 74 days	Hauts-de-France	Hauts-de-France
6	Marie Brémont	F	25 April 1886	6 June 2001	115 years, 42 days	Pays de la Loire	Pays de la Loire
7	Andrée Bertoletto	F	1 January 1911	16 October 2025	114 years, 288 days	Pays de la Loire	Pays de la Loire
8	Eudoxie Baboul	F	1 October 1901	1 July 2016	114 years, 274 days	French Guiana	French Guiana
9	Eugénie Blanchard	F	16 February 1896	4 November 2010	114 years, 261 days	Saint Barthélemy	Saint Barthélemy
10	Lydie Vellard	F	18 March 1875	17 September 1989	114 years, 183 days	Centre-Val de Loire	Centre-Val de Loire
11	Gabrielle des Robert	F	4 June 1904	3 December 2018	114 years, 182 days	Grand Est	Pays de la Loire
12	Camille Loiseau	F	13 February 1892	12 August 2006	114 years, 180 days	Ile-de-France	Ile-de-France
13	Anne Primout	F	5 October 1890	26 March 2005	114 years, 172 days	French Algeria	Occitanie
14	Madeleine Dellamonica	F	23 July 1912	Living	114 years, 122 days	Ile-de-France	Ile-de-France
15	Honorine Rondello	F	28 July 1903	19 October 2017	114 years, 83 days	Brittany	Provence-Alpes-Cote d'Azur
16	Marie-Louise Taterode	F	17 July 1906	3 September 2020	114 years, 48 days	Nouvelle-Aquitaine	Auvergne-Rhone-Alpes
17	Marie Liguinen	F	26 March 1901	2 April 2015	114 years, 7 days	Nouvelle-Aquitaine	Ile-de-France
18	Marie-Thérèse Bardet	F	2 June 1898	8 June 2012	114 years, 6 days	Brittany	Pays de la Loire
19	Olympe Amaury	F	19 June 1901	12 May 2015	113 years, 327 days	Bourgogne-Franche-Comte	Centre-Val de Loire
20	Luce Maced	F	2 May 1886	25 February 2000	113 years, 299 days	Guadeloupe	Martinique
21	Marcelle Narbonne	F	25 March 1898	1 January 2012	113 years, 282 days	French Algeria	Occitanie
22	Clémentine Solignac	F	7 September 1894	25 May 2008	113 years, 261 days	Auvergne-Rhone-Alpes	Auvergne-Rhone-Alpes
23	Huguette Masson	F	27 June 1904	5 March 2018	113 years, 251 days	Pays de la Loire	Pays de la Loire
24	Maria Diaz	F	22 February 1898	29 October 2011	113 years, 249 days	French Algeria	Réunion
25	Émilienne Bécarmin	F	4 June 1911	15 January 2025	113 years, 225 days	Guadeloupe	Guadeloupe
26	Élise Tavan	F	16 April 1909	7 November 2022	113 years, 205 days	Auvergne-Rhone-Alpes	Auvergne-Rhone-Alpes
27	Jeanne Lara	F	1 April 1906	16 October 2019	113 years, 198 days	Spain	Occitanie
28	Germaine Haye	F	10 October 1888	18 April 2002	113 years, 190 days	Normandy	Normandy
29	Marie-Florentine Jousseaume	F	17 June 1907	20 December 2020	113 years, 186 days	Pays de la Loire	Pays de la Loire
29	Marcelle Demorgny	F	10 March 1913	12 September 2026	113 years, 186 days	Nouvelle-Aquitaine	Nouvelle-Aquitaine
31	Marie-Simone Capony	F	14 March 1894	15 September 2007	113 years, 185 days	Auvergne-Rhone-Alpes	Provence-Alpes-Cote d'Azur
32	Marie-Louise Berthelot	F	29 July 1907	16 January 2021	113 years, 171 days	Pays de la Loire	Pays de la Loire
33	Mathilde Aussant	F	27 February 1898	23 July 2011	113 years, 146 days	Pays de la Loire	Centre-Val de Loire
34	Aline Blaïn	F	10 August 1911	27 December 2024	113 years, 139 days	Auvergne-Rhone-Alpes	Provence-Alpes-Cote d'Azur
35	Madeleine Chat	F	10 August 1907	14 December 2020	113 years, 126 days	Bourgogne-Franche-Comte	Bourgogne-Franche-Comte
36	Julie Montabord	F	17 April 1906	18 July 2019	113 years, 92 days	Martinique	Martinique
37	Julia Sinédia-Cazour	F	12 July 1892	6 October 2005	113 years, 86 days	Réunion	Réunion
38	Élisabeth Collot	F	21 June 1903	4 September 2016	113 years, 75 days	Grand Est	Auvergne-Rhone-Alpes
39	Juliette Bildé	F	30 September 1909	13 December 2022	113 years, 74 days	Nouvelle-Aquitaine	Nouvelle-Aquitaine
40	Marthe Roch	F	19 August 1907	21 September 2020	113 years, 33 days	Guadeloupe	Guadeloupe
41	Georgette Huard	F	24 November 1912	23 December 2025	113 years, 29 days	Normandy	Normandy
42	Mathilde Lartigue	F	24 March 1905	24 March 2018	113 years, 0 days	Occitanie	Occitanie
43	Pauline Chabanny	F	20 August 1881	13 August 1994	112 years, 358 days	Centre-Val de Loire	Auvergne-Rhone-Alpes
44	Thérèse Ladigue	F	15 February 1903	5 February 2016	112 years, 355 days	Auvergne-Rhone-Alpes	Auvergne-Rhone-Alpes
45	Jeanne Dumaine	F	19 March 1886	3 January 1999	112 years, 290 days	Ile-de-France	Ile-de-France
46	Jéromine Guiltat	F	26 June 1911	7 April 2024	112 years, 286 days	Corsica	Ile-de-France
47	Marie Mornet	F	4 April 1894	5 January 2007	112 years, 276 days	Nouvelle-Aquitaine	Nouvelle-Aquitaine
48	Marie-Louise André	F	16 October 1912	9 July 2025	112 years, 266 days	Provence-Alpes-Cote d'Azur	Provence-Alpes-Cote d'Azur
49	Henriette Bœuf	F	4 November 1903	23 July 2016	112 years, 262 days	Grand Est	Grand Est
50	Marie-Louise Pellet	F	7 March 1914	Living	112 years, 260 days	Bourgogne-Franche-Comte	Auvergne-Rhone-Alpes
51	Joséphine Choquet	F	6 June 1878	14 February 1991	112 years, 253 days	Brittany	Hauts-de-France
52	Irène Laroche	F	23 March 1914	Living	112 years, 244 days	Provence-Alpes-Cote d'Azur	Occitanie
53	Lucie Péré-Pucheu	F	13 August 1893	6 April 2006	112 years, 236 days	Nouvelle-Aquitaine	Nouvelle-Aquitaine
54	Marie-Thérèse Poulain	F	25 November 1911	16 July 2024	112 years, 234 days	Hauts-de-France	Auvergne-Rhone-Alpes
55	Gabrielle Ormand	F	24 February 1909	8 October 2021	112 years, 226 days	Pays de la Loire	Ile-de-France
56	Mélanie Leblais	F	4 September 1903	3 April 2016	112 years, 212 days	Pays de la Loire	Pays de la Loire
57	Irénise Moulonguet	F	6 November 1900	28 May 2013	112 years, 203 days	Martinique	Martinique
58	Georges Thomas	M	19 November 1911	1 June 2024	112 years, 195 days	Nouvelle-Aquitaine	Nouvelle-Aquitaine
59	Jeanne Chabbert	F	1 August 1909	10 February 2022	112 years, 193 days	Occitanie	Occitanie
60	Ilse Weiszfeld	F	16 October 1904	22 April 2017	112 years, 188 days	Austria	Ile-de-France
61	Yvonne Francier	F	28 February 1913	2 September 2025	112 years, 186 days	Belgium	Corsica
62	Marie-Louise L'Huillier	F	26 June 1895	28 December 2007	112 years, 185 days	New Caledonia	New Caledonia
63	Suzanne Décélis	F	13 July 1909	6 January 2022	112 years, 177 days	French Algeria	Ile-de-France
64	Samuèle Goustille	F	12 October 1913	3 April 2026	112 years, 173 days	Pays de la Loire	Provence-Alpes-Cote d'Azur
65	Andrée Guyon	F	6 June 1911	25 November 2023	112 years, 172 days	Centre-Val de Loire	Centre-Val de Loire
66	Marguerite Petit	F	3 July 1883	21 December 1995	112 years, 171 days	Lorraine (Note: Lorraine and Alsace were at that time parts of the German Empire, as the Alsace-Lorraine territory. They are now in France.)	Grand Est
67	Anna Roux	F	13 July 1895	25 December 2007	112 years, 165 days	Nouvelle-Aquitaine	Nouvelle-Aquitaine
68	Marcel Meys	M	12 July 1909	15 December 2021	112 years, 156 days	Auvergne-Rhone-Alpes	Auvergne-Rhone-Alpes
69	Marguerite Larmignat	F	9 February 1911	11 July 2023	112 years, 152 days	Centre-Val de Loire	Auvergne-Rhone-Alpes
70	Eugénie Roux	F	24 January 1874	20 June 1986	112 years, 147 days	Bourgogne-Franche-Comte	Auvergne-Rhone-Alpes
71	Yvonne Bory	F	14 March 1891	7 August 2003	112 years, 146 days	Nouvelle-Aquitaine	Centre-Val de Loire
72	Marie-Louise Delefortrie	F	18 May 1908	29 September 2020	112 years, 134 days	Hauts-de-France	Hauts-de-France
72	Denise Leroy	F	3 July 1913	14 November 2025	112 years, 134 days	Pays de la Loire	Pays de la Loire
74	Marguerite Lecourt	F	16 July 1914	Living	112 years, 129 days	Normandy	Normandy
75	Jeanne Colas	F	9 June 1886	15 October 1998	112 years, 128 days	Grand Est	Bourgogne-Franche-Comte
76	Suzanne Burrier	F	14 March 1901	14 July 2013	112 years, 122 days	Auvergne-Rhone-Alpes	Auvergne-Rhone-Alpes
76	Marie-Antoinette Radix	F	7 December 1904	8 April 2017	112 years, 122 days	Auvergne-Rhone-Alpes	Auvergne-Rhone-Alpes
78	Agnès Fagoo	F	19 December 1894	12 April 2007	112 years, 114 days	Hauts-de-France	Hauts-de-France
79	Constance Cariou	F	8 May 1895	29 August 2007	112 years, 113 days	Pays de la Loire	Provence-Alpes-Cote d'Azur
80	Mathilde Dupray	F	31 October 1903	18 February 2016	112 years, 110 days	Normandy	Brittany
81	Henriette Roques	F	8 September 1905	20 December 2017	112 years, 103 days	Occitanie	Occitanie
82	Marguerite Bailly	F	6 March 1907	12 June 2019	112 years, 98 days	Hauts-de-France	Grand Est
83	Camille Faget	F	18 July 1913	23 October 2025	112 years, 97 days	Nouvelle-Aquitaine	Nouvelle-Aquitaine
83	Hélène Malfuson	F	29 June 1914	4 October 2026	112 years, 97 days	French Tunisia	Provence-Alpes-Cote d'Azur
85	Estelle Zimmermann	F	18 September 1912	19 December 2024	112 years, 92 days	Pays de la Loire	Occitanie
86	Célestine Colombeau	F	17 February 1884	9 May 1996	112 years, 82 days	Pays de la Loire	Pays de la Loire
87	Marie-Louise Jeancard	F	5 September 1876	25 November 1988	112 years, 81 days	Provence-Alpes-Cote d'Azur	Provence-Alpes-Cote d'Azur
88	Giselle Riboust	F	11 February 1914	25 April 2026	112 years, 73 days	Ile-de-France	Ile-de-France
89	Elisabeth Frénoy	F	7 February 1907	20 April 2019	112 years, 72 days	Grand Est	Grand Est
90	Étiennette Bourouiba	F	14 September 1914	Living	112 years, 69 days	Nouvelle-Aquitaine	Nouvelle-Aquitaine
91	Marie-Louise Jaouen	F	17 September 1914	Living	112 years, 66 days	Brittany	Brittany
92	Augustine Teissier	F	2 January 1869	8 March 1981	112 years, 65 days	Occitanie	Occitanie
92	Anne-Marie Masse	F	21 July 1909	24 September 2021	112 years, 65 days	Hauts-de-France	Centre-Val de Loire
94	Paule Bronzini	F	7 July 1900	29 August 2012	112 years, 53 days	Provence-Alpes-Cote d'Azur	Provence-Alpes-Cote d'Azur
95	Mathilde Octavie Tafna	F	16 March 1895	1 May 2007	112 years, 46 days	Guadeloupe	Guadeloupe
96	Jeannette Laham	F	1 February 1914	12 March 2026	112 years, 39 days	Hauts-de-France	Occitanie
97	Augusta Oteiza	F	3 May 1912	10 June 2024	112 years, 38 days	Nouvelle-Aquitaine	Nouvelle-Aquitaine
98	Eugénie Dauzat	F	6 December 1900	12 January 2013	112 years, 37 days	Auvergne-Rhone-Alpes	Auvergne-Rhone-Alpes
99	Madeleine Désert	F	15 May 1907	15 June 2019	112 years, 31 days	Pays de la Loire	Ile-de-France
99	Jeanne Delétang	F	27 October 1909	27 November 2021	112 years, 31 days	Nouvelle-Aquitaine	Nouvelle-Aquitaine

== Biographies ==
=== Germaine Haye ===
Germaine Haye (née Germain; 10 October 1888 – 18 April 2002) was France's oldest living person for about a year, following the death of 115-year-old Marie Brémont on 6 June 2001 until her own death at age 113 years and 190 days. At the time of her death, she was the oldest living person in Europe.

Haye lived in the town of Mortagne-au-Perche in Orne, Normandy, western France, since she was 19 years old. She worked as a babysitter and a teacher until her three daughters grew up and left home. She then devoted herself to literature, publishing poems under the pseudonym Anne Moranget.

=== Camille Loiseau ===
Camille Blanche Loiseau (13 February 1892 – 12 August 2006) was the oldest living person in France until her death aged 114 years and 180 days.

Loiseau was born in Paris, the youngest of nine children, four boys and five girls. On 13 August 1910, she married René Frédéric Chadal, but divorced him 15 days later. Loiseau never married again, and had no children of her own, but helped raise her nephews. She worked as an accountant until 1957.

She was hospitalised in 1998 due to a fall and moved permanently to the Hôpital Paul-Brousse in Villejuif, Val-de-Marne in January 1999. In 2002, aged 110, she was taken on a trip to revisit her native Paris.

=== Marie-Isabelle Diaz ===
Marie-Isabelle Diaz (née Rodriguez; 22 February 1898 – 29 October 2011) was posthumously recognised as the oldest living French person from the death of Eugénie Blanchard on 4 November 2010, until her own death almost a year later. She is also the oldest person ever from the French possession of Réunion. Diaz was born in Sidi Bel Abbès, Algeria, then an overseas territory of France. She was married and had three children. Her husband died aged 60. After Algerian independence, Diaz left her homeland in 1962. She then settled in Spain with one of her sons and lived in Rouen for a few years. Diaz lived in Réunion from 1983 until her death. She was 113 years and 249 days old when she died.

=== Mathilde Aussant ===
Mathilde Aussant (née Gaudet; 27 February 1898 – 23 July 2011) was, until her death, believed to be the oldest verified person in France. However, she was later confirmed as having been the second oldest, when Marie-Isabelle Diaz was verified to have been born a few days earlier than her, on 22 February 1898, and died three months after her.

Aussant was born in Donges, the fifth of eleven children born to François Gaudet and Hélène Halgand. Following the death of her mother, she left Donges for Paris in 1923. She worked as a housekeeper and babysitter. She married a railway worker from Gare Saint-Lazare, who died in 1936. In 1946, she married another railway worker, René Aussant, who died in 1961. Their only child, a daughter, died in 2007, leaving Aussant without any immediate family. In 1999, she moved to a retirement home. In 2008, aged 110, Aussant was awarded the "Medal of the city of Donges". She died at a hospital in the Vendôme region on 23 July 2011, aged 113 years and 146 days.

=== André Ludwig ===
André Ludwig (6 June 1912 – 7 January 2024) was, at the time of his death, the oldest World War II veteran in the world. He was born in La Ferte-sous-Jouarre and never knew his parents, being raised by his grandmother. He trained as a painter and later worked as a fitter. He married Yvonne Ludwig in 1935 and they had one daughter. In 1939, Ludwig was mobilised to fight in the Second World War, but was captured by German forces in Épinal and deported to Poland. He escaped in 1942, was caught again, and was later sent to a labour camp in Germany, from which he also escaped. He served in the French resistance during the final stages of the war. Ludwig later worked as a middle manager and retired in 1972, moving to Longué-Jumelles, where he would spend the rest of his life. His wife died when he was 100. Shortly before his 109th birthday, he fractured a femur and underwent an operation; he had previously been in good health.

=== Henri Content ===
Henri Content (4 January 1916 – 15 February 2026) was, at the time of his death, the oldest man in France. He was born in Vault-de-Lugny, and worked as a teacher.
