= List of Portuguese supercentenarians =

Portuguese supercentenarians are citizens, residents or emigrants from Portugal or its former colonies who have attained or surpassed 110 years of age. As of January 2015, the Gerontology Research Group (GRG) had validated the longevity claims of 9 Portuguese supercentenarians, including 7 residents and 2 emigrants. Maria de Jesus was the oldest Portuguese citizen whose age was validated; she lived 115 years and 114 days, from 1893 to 2009.

== Oldest known Portuguese people ==
Deceased Living

Rank	Name	Sex	Birth date	Death date	Age	Birthplace	Place of Death or Residence
1	Maria de Jesus	F	10 September 1893	2 January 2009	115 years, 114 days	Santarém	Santarém
2	Maria do Couto Maia-Lopes	F	24 October 1890	25 July 2005	114 years, 274 days	Porto	Porto
3	Adelina Domingues	F	19 February 1888	21 August 2002	114 years, 183 days	Portuguese Cape; Verde	United States
4	Maria Jorge Esteves de Almeida	F	28 May 1912	8 July 2026	114 years, 41 days	Coimbra	Brazil
5	Maria da Conceição Brito	F	31 December 1912	22 August 2026	113 years, 234 days	Faro	Faro
6	Maria da Encarnação Nunes de Sousa	F	20 March 1909	20 July 2022	113 years, 122 days	Guarda	Coimbra
7	Maria Luíza Nunes da Silva	F	7 July 1898	26 September 2011	113 years, 81 days	Porto	Lisbon
8	Catarina Carreiro-Pascoal	F	9 January 1891	13 February 2004	113 years, 35 days	Castelo Branco	Castelo Branco
9	Lourdina Conceição Lobo	F	8 December 1908	3 November 2021	112 years, 330 days	Portuguese India	India
10	Maria da Conceição	F	7 December 1904	9 October 2017	112 years, 306 days	Coimbra	Braga
11	Clara Lopes dos Santos	F	26 March 1894	25 October 2006	112 years, 213 days	Viseu	Lisbon
12	Carmelina Augusta Delgado	F	8 November 1900	19 May 2013	112 years, 192 days	Bragança	Bragança
13	Augusto Moreira de Oliveira	M	6 October 1896	13 February 2009	112 years, 130 days	Aveiro	Porto
14	Matilda D'Souza	F	25 October 1911	17 September 2023	111 years, 327 days	Portuguese India	India
15	Mary Marques	F	11 February 1896	3 January 2008	111 years, 326 days	Leiria	United States
16	Elvira de Jesus Caldeira de Figueiredo	F	27 July 1886	5 June 1998	111 years, 313 days	Coimbra	Coimbra
17	Camilia Gonçalves	F	23 October 1911	21 August 2023	111 years, 302 days	Coimbra	Brazil
18	Joaquina Martins	F	13 January 1907	14 October 2018	111 years, 274 days	Lisbon	Lisbon
19	Ilda da Silva	F	16 April 1913	12 January 2025	111 years, 271 days	Faro	Lisbon
20	Benvinda Marques Matias	F	15 February 1906	23 September 2017	111 years, 220 days	Coimbra	Leiria
21	Albano Andrade	M	14 December 1909	29 June 2021	111 years, 197 days	Aveiro	Aveiro
22	Laurinda da Conceição	F	18 May 1904	9 November 2015	111 years, 175 days	Leiria	Leiria
23	Joaquim Varela	M	1 June 1915	Living	111 years, 173 days	Beja	Faro
24	Antonio Fernandes de Castro	M	6 January 1898	22 June 2009	111 years, 167 days	Braga	Braga
25	Joaquina Guilhermina	F	23 July 1915	Living	111 years, 121 days	Santarém	Santarém
26	Maria Virgínia de Abreu Ferreira de Almeida Pestana	F	3 April 1899	1 August 2010	111 years, 120 days	Porto	Coimbra
27	Susana Correia Conceição Silva Reis	F	23 April 1905	9 May 2016	111 years, 16 days	Lisbon	Lisbon
28	Maria Pereira	F	14 June 1868	24 June 1979	111 years, 10 days	Viseu	Lisbon
29	Maria Dolores Ferreira	F	22 July 1902	31 July 2013	111 years, 9 days	Braga	Braga
30	Rosa Quaresma Furtado	F	3 December 1915	Living	110 years, 353 days	Azores	United States
31	Maria d’Almeida	F	29 September 1899	11 September 2010	110 years, 347 days	Coimbra	Lisbon
32	Mariana Damas Romão de Almeida	F	22 February 1911	29 January 2022	110 years, 341 days	Aveiro	Porto
33	Romana Sousa Marques	F	22 July 1908	15 June 2019	110 years, 328 days	Leiria	Leiria
34	Celestina Rebelo	F	26 August 1914	20 June 2025	110 years, 298 days	Guarda	Guarda
35	Maria Felícia Roseiro Bento	F	8 April 1901	29 December 2011	110 years, 265 days	Coimbra	Coimbra
36	Adelaide Sofia	F	1 November 1913	12 July 2024	110 years, 254 days	Viseu	Viseu
37	Julia Rose	F	27 January 1902	21 September 2012	110 years, 238 days	Azores	United States
38	Deolinda Nazaré d'Almeida	F	20 February 1913	12 October 2023	110 years, 234 days	Lisbon	Aveiro
39	Alice Sanders	F	12 May 1897	7 November 2007	110 years, 179 days	Azores	United States
40	José Fernandes Morgado	M	10 January 1912	18 June 2022	110 years, 159 days	Leiria	Brazil
40	Fernanda da Costa	F	2 June 1914	8 November 2024	110 years, 159 days	Viseu	Viseu
42	Joaquim Valente	M	30 January 1911	10 May 2021	110 years, 100 days	Guarda	Guarda
43	Olinda Paulo Baeta	F	9 October 1911	7 January 2022	110 years, 90 days	Coimbra	Coimbra
44	Custódia Maria Inácia	F	26 April 1913	14 July 2023	110 years, 79 days	Beja	Faro
45	Ana Pires	F	28 July 1915	12 October 2025	110 years, 76 days	Viana do Castelo	Viana do Castelo
46	Herminia dos Santos Correa	F	17 July 1910	27 September 2020	110 years, 72 days	Bragança	Bragança
47	José Martins	M	7 March 1912	14 May 2022	110 years, 68 days	Madeira	Madeira
48	Maria Rosalina do Carmo Fernandes	F	23 January 1902	21 February 2012	110 years, 29 days	Castelo Branco	Castelo Branco
49	Maria José Rodrigues	F	14 January 1886	16 January 1996	110 years, 2 days	Leiria	Brazil
50	Carlota dos Anjos Guerra	F	9 October 1911	10 October 2021	110 years, 1 day	Bragança	Bragança

== Biographies ==
=== Maria do Couto Maia-Lopes ===
Maria do Couto Maia-Lopes (24 October 1890 – 25 July 2005) is the 2nd longest-lived person to be documented in Portugal. She was born and lived in Grijó, in Vila Nova de Gaia, which is near the city of Porto.

She had a total of eight daughters, seven grandchildren, ten great-grandchildren and five great-great-grandchildren. Her husband died in 1942. One of her great-granddaughters married a grandson of Portugal's oldest ever man, Augusto Moreira de Oliveira (1896 – 2009). Maia-Lopes died on 25 July 2005, aged 114 years 274 days.

=== Alice Sanders ===
Alice Sanders (São Jorge Island, 12 May 1897 – Merced, California, 7 November 2007) was one of the last survivors of the 1906 San Francisco earthquake. Alice Catarina Matos was born in the Azores archipelago. Her family emigrated to Half Moon Bay (California) in 1903, when Alice was six years old. In 1912, the Matos family moved to Gustine, where Alice met Clarence Leonard Sanders, whom she married in 1913.

=== Maria da Conceição Brito ===
Maria da Conceição Brito was born in São Romão (Seia) Faro, Portugal, on 31 December 1912. She worked as a farmer. She married and had at least one son. Da Conceição Brito was reported to be mentally sharp by staff at her nursing home. On 20 August 2023, following the death of Inacia Carmelino, Da Conceição Brito became Portugal's oldest living resident. She died on 22 August 2026, in Alportel, Portugal.
