= List of Argentine supercentenarians =

Argentine supercentenarians are citizens, residents or emigrants from Argentina who have attained or surpassed the age of 110. Organizations that specialize in extreme age verification, such as the Gerontology Research Group (GRG) and LongeviQuest (LQ), have validated the longevity claims of Argentine supercentenarians.

The oldest validated Argentine person ever is Casilda Ramona Benegas, who died in 2022, aged 115 years and 81 days. The oldest living Argentine person is Matilde Pedernera de Gnaden, who is aged 110 years, 354 days.

== Oldest Argentine people ever ==
Deceased Living

| Rank | Name | Sex | Birth date | Death date | Age | Birthplace | Place of Death or Residence |
|---|---|---|---|---|---|---|---|
| 1 | Casilda Ramona Benegas | F | 8 April 1907 | 28 June 2022 | 115 years, 81 days | Paraguay | Buenos Aires |
| 2 | Evangelista Luisa López | F | 21 June 1907 | 28 August 2021 | 114 years, 68 days | Santa Fe | Buenos Aires |
| 3 | Rosa Micaela Puertas | F | 29 September 1912 | 1 November 2026 | 114 years, 33 days | Buenos Aires | Buenos Aires |
| 4 | Angélica Tiscornia | F | 22 August 1912 | 15 September 2026 | 114 years, 24 days | Entre Ríos | Buenos Aires |
| 5 | Isabel Barletta | F | 12 September 1911 | 12 May 2025 | 113 years, 242 days | Buenos Aires | Buenos Aires |
| 6 | Virginia Moyano Ponce | F | 17 May 1904 | 20 June 2017 | 113 years, 34 days | Córdoba | La Rioja |
| 7 | Azucena Lucía Suárez Wilde de Ricotti | F | 1 July 1893 | 18 April 2006 | 112 years, 291 days | Jujuy | Jujuy |
| 8 | Luisa Roncoroni De Bizzozero | F | 30 June 1903 | 1 September 2015 | 112 years, 63 days | Buenos Aires | Buenos Aires |
| 9 | Onorina Apprato de Tagliaferro | F | 7 July 1913 | 10 August 2025 | 112 years, 34 days | Italy | Córdoba |
| 10 | Martina Rodríguez de Medina | F | 12 November 1892 | 31 October 2004 | 111 years, 354 days | Córdoba | Córdoba |
| 11 | Margherita Carossio Monti | F | 10 August 1905 | 30 June 2017 | 111 years, 324 days | Italy | Buenos Aires |
| 12 | María Teresa Bustos | F | 26 April 1912 | 13 February 2024 | 111 years, 293 days | Córdoba | Córdoba |
| 13 | Gisela Lamm de Altschul | F | 16 April 1878 | 13 June 1989 | 111 years, 58 days | Austria-Hungary (Note: Lamm de Altschul was born in Boskowitz, then part of Moravia in the Austrian part of Austria-Hungary, today Boskovice in the Czech Republic.) | Buenos Aires |
| 14 | Matilde Pedernera de Gnaden | F | 26 November 1915 | Living | 110 years, 354 days | Córdoba | Córdoba |
| 15 | Carmen Góngora De Yaggi | F | 21 September 1857 | 3 June 1968 | 110 years, 256 days | Santa Fe | Santa Fe |
| 16 | María Gabriela Calderón | F | 22 February 1912 | 29 September 2022 | 110 years, 219 days | Buenos Aires | Buenos Aires |
| 17 | Marie Clavié | F | 23 July 1897 | 15 February 2008 | 110 years, 207 days | Santa Fe | France |
| 18 | Modesta Vivas | F | 24 May 1914 | 14 December 2024 | 110 years, 204 days | Mendoza | France |
| 19 | Silvia Angélica Sánchez Martínez | F | 31 July 1916 | Living | 110 years, 107 days | Córdoba | Tucumán |
| 20 | Noemí Bisso de Zanetta | F | 15 April 1901 | 19 July 2011 | 110 years, 95 days | Buenos Aires | Buenos Aires |
| 21 | Severa Balcarce de Cruz | F | 8 November 1914 | 21 January 2025 | 110 years, 74 days | Jujuy | Jujuy |
| 22 | Natividad Ramos Fernández | F | 25 December 1903 | 21 February 2014 | 110 years, 58 days | Unknown | Spain |
