= List of Colombian supercentenarians =

People from Colombia who have attained or surpassed the age of 110 years

This list comprises Colombian supercentenarians (people from Colombia who have attained the age of at least 110 years). Organizations that specialize in extreme age verification, such as the Gerontology Research Group (GRG) and LongeviQuest, have validated the longevity claims of Colombian supercentenarians.

The oldest validated Colombian person ever is Sofía Rojas, who died in 2022, aged 114 years and 351 days. The oldest validated Colombian man ever is Efraín Antonio Ríos García, who died in 2024, aged 113 years and 282 days.

== Colombian supercentenarians ==
Deceased Living

Rank	Name	Sex	Birth date	Death date	Age	Birthplace	Place of death or residence
1	Sofía Rojas	F	13 August 1907	30 July 2022	114 years, 351 days	Santander	Santander
2	Carmen Jaramillo Chavarria	F	17 May 1906	15 July 2020	114 years, 59 days	Antioquia	Antioquia
3	Juana Aritama	F	24 June 1907	21 May 2021	113 years, 331 days	Magdalena	Magdalena
4	Efraín Antonio Ríos García	M	4 April 1910	11 Jan 2024	113 years, 282 days	Antioquia	Antioquia
5	Francisca Mangonez Martínez	F	4 July 1910	18 March 2024	113 years, 258 days	Sucre	Sucre
6	Eusebio Quintero López	M	6 March 1910	16 July 2023	113 years, 132 days	Valle del Cauca	Valle del Cauca
7	Benilda Ospino Altamar	F	28 December 1897	28 December 2010	113 years, 0 days	Magdalena	Magdalena
8	Natalia Villanueva Ruiz	F	24 February 1911	21 December 2023	112 years, 300 days	Boyaca	Antioquia
9	Alicia Castillo	F	28 January 1906	25 September 2018	112 years, 240 days	Cundinamarca	Valle del Cauca
10	Tránsito Ayala	F	13 August 1896	09 October 2008	112 years, 57 days	Santander	Bogotá
11	Claudina Higuita de Robledo	F	30 October 1910	20 December 2022	112 years, 51 days	Antioquia	Antioquia
12	Ana Sara Márquez de Ramírez	F	25 July 1904	27 August 2016	112 years, 33 days	Caldas	Quindio
13	Isabel Castaño Restrepo	F	11 January 1906	6 February 2018	112 years, 26 days	Caldas	United States
14	Magdalena Hernández	F	13 July 1900	20 July 2012	112 years, 7 days	Santander	Santander
15	Aurora Soto Rubio	F	2 February 1903	8 February 2015	112 years, 6 days	Antioquia	Antioquia
16	Julio Saldarriaga Hernández	M	3 November 1913	10 October 2025	111 years, 341 days	Antioquia	Antioquia
17	Ana Faustina Tejada	F	9 February 1915	Living	111 years, 277 days	Cauca	Bogotá
18	Candelaria Padilla	F	4 October 1911	22 June 2023	111 years, 261 days	Córdoba	Bolívar
19	Luis Cano	M	9 December 1914	15 June 2026	111 years, 188 days	Antioquia	United States
20	Sixta Tulia Aguinaga de Posada	F	22 April 1907	6 October 2018	111 years, 167 days	Antioquia	United States
21	Ana María Urrea Solano	F	26 June 1915	Living	111 years, 140 days	Valle del Cauca	Valle del Cauca
22	Elena Torres	F	17 October 1908	18 February 2020	111 years, 124 days	Bolívar	Bolívar
23	Daniel Guzmán García	M	6 February 1897	21 May 2008	111 years, 105 days	Tolima	Valle del Cauca
24	Carmen Tulia Congote	F	3 November 1911	14 February 2023	111 years, 103 days	Antioquia	Antioquia
25	María Teresa Madrid	F	18 April 1914	11 June 2025	111 years, 54 days	Antioquia	Antioquia
26	Guillermo Antonio Mesa Sierra	M	6 August 1910	20 September 2021	111 years, 45 days	Antioquia	Antioquia
27	Isabel Brito Guarín	F	15 May 1905	18 June 2016	111 years, 34 days	Quindio	Risaralda
28	Alfonso María Rojas Perdomo	M	31 May 1913	29 June 2024	111 years, 29 days	Huila	Huila
29	Elvira Montoya Ordóñez	F	13 July 1904	16 July 2015	111 years, 3 days	Nariño	Nariño
30	Delia María Solano	F	13 January 1914	5 December 2024	110 years, 327 days	Atlántico	Atlántico
31	Ana Felisa David García	F	15 February 1897	29 November 2007	110 years, 287 days	Antioquia	Antioquia
32	Adolfo Camacho Ripoll	M	13 April 1915	23 December 2025	110 years, 254 days	Bolívar	Bolívar
33	Lucio Chiquito Caicedo	M	22 May 1916	13 November 2026	110 years, 175 days	Valle del Cauca	Antioquia
34	Ana Joaquina Rivera de Muriel	F	5 September 1910	11 February 2021	110 years, 159 days	Antioquia	Antioquia
35	Ana Rita Rojas	F	31 March 1910	23 August 2020	110 years, 145 days	Antioquia	Risaralda
36	Martha Castañeda	F	16 October 1911	3 February 2022	110 years, 110 days	Caldas	Valle del Cauca
37	Mélida Tascón de Holguín	F	12 July 1911	26 October 2021	110 years, 106 days	Valle del Cauca	Valle del Cauca
38	Herminia Rosa López	F	21 January 1912	19 April 2022	110 years, 88 days	Antioquia	Antioquia
39	Anonymous	F	8 January 1914	29 March 2024	110 years, 81 days	Bolívar	Bolívar
40	María Agustina Reyes de Flórez	F	8 August 1909	18 October 2019	110 years, 71 days	Córdoba	Córdoba
41	Carmen Porras Flórez	F	2 April 1906	2 May 2016	110 years, 30 days	Bolívar	Atlántico
42	Graciela Quintero	F	22 August 1914	14 September 2024	110 years, 23 days	Antioquia	Antioquia
43	Pastora Castro	F	11 May 1908	30 May 2018	110 years, 19 days	Antioquia	Antioquia
44	María del Carmen Valencia	F	23 April 1909	23 April 2019	110 years, 0 days	Caldas	Cundinamarca
