= List of Finnish supercentenarians =

People from Finland who have attained or surpassed the age of 110 years

Finnish supercentenarians are citizens, residents or emigrants from Finland who have attained the age of at least 110 years. The oldest person ever from Finland was Maria Rothovius, who died in 2000, aged 112 years 259 days. All Finnish supercentenarians were born at a time when Finland was an autonomous state of the Russian Empire.

== Finnish supercentenarians ==
Deceased Living

Rank	Name	Sex	Birth date	Death date	Age	Birthplace	Place of death or residence
1	Maria Rothovius	F	2 October 1887	17 June 2000	112 years, 259 days	Uusimaa	Pirkanmaa
2	Gunborg Hancock	F	20 April 1912	16 October 2024	112 years, 179 days	Uusimaa	Sweden
3	Suoma Korkee	F	30 May 1886	1 August 1998	112 years, 63 days	Satakunta	United States
4	Hilda Häkkinen	F	18 March 1894	31 December 2005	111 years, 288 days	South Ostrobothnia	South Ostrobothnia
5	Selma Tuominen	F	19 July 1903	12 April 2015	111 years, 267 days	Southwest Finland	Southwest Finland
6	Aarne Arvonen	M	4 August 1897	1 January 2009	111 years, 150 days	Uusimaa	Uusimaa
7	Fanny Nyström	F	30 September 1878	31 August 1989	110 years, 335 days	Southwest Finland	Southwest Finland
8	Sirkka Nieminen	F	28 April 1912	13 January 2023	110 years, 260 days	Southwest Finland	Uusimaa
9	Helvi Kissala	F	26 October 1913	12 June 2024	110 years, 230 days	Pirkanmaa	Pirkanmaa
10	Saara Ahonen	F	24 November 1909	29 May 2020	110 years, 187 days	Pirkanmaa	Kanta-Häme
11	Astrid Qvist	F	6 March 1912	18 July 2022	110 years, 134 days	Ostrobothnia	Ostrobothnia
12	Helfrid Eriksson	F	23 June 1908	23 October 2018	110 years, 122 days	Uusimaa	Ostrobothnia
13	Anna Hagman	F	27 December 1895	18 April 2006	110 years, 112 days	Åland	Åland
14	Elsa Tilkanen	F	26 September 1896	5 December 2006	110 years, 70 days	Southwest Finland	Southwest Finland
14	Gunnel Stenbäck	F	21 September 1914	30 November 2024	110 years, 70 days	Åland	Uusimaa
16	Helvi Kärki	F	7 December 1906	23 January 2017	110 years, 47 days	Pirkanmaa	Kanta-Häme
