= Gerontology Research Group =

Global researcher group

Gerontology Research Group (GRG)
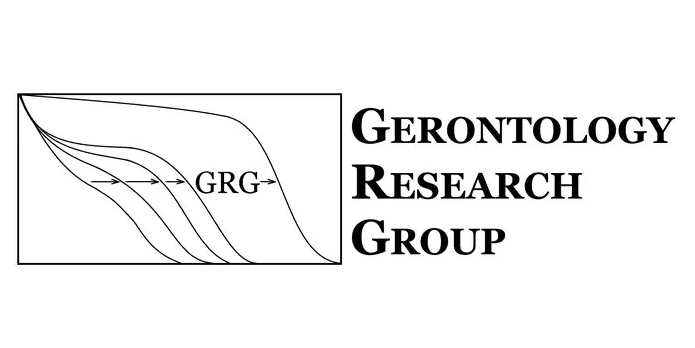
- Formation: 1990; 36 years ago as LA-GRG (original chapter)
- Founder: L. Stephen Coles; Stephen M. Kaye
- Founded at: Los Angeles, California, United States
- Type: Nonprofit
- Purpose: Gerontology research
- Headquarters: Los Angeles. California, US
- Region served: Worldwide
- Products: Recordkeeping and analysis, meetings, website, online forum
- Services: Recording the Verified oldest people list, tracking supercentenarians, research in ageing
- Fields: Gerontology
- Owner: John M. Adams
- Director: John M. Adams
- Key people: L. Stephen Coles, Stephen M. Kaye (founders)
- Website: grg.org
- Mission: Slow and ultimately reverse age related decline

The Gerontology Research Group (GRG) based in Los Angeles, California, US, is a global non-profit scientific organization of researchers in various fields of gerontology, primarily concerned with validating the ages of, recording and researching supercentenarians (people who are at least 110 years old).

The group endeavors to further gerontology research with a goal of slowing and reversing aging. Many of its worldwide correspondents are respected scientists and PhD holders.

== History ==
The GRG was founded in 1990 by L. Stephen Coles and Stephen M. Kaye. The original chapter of the LA-GRG holds meetings each month, though the organization has members worldwide who meet via online forums and video meetings.

The GRG's current director, upon the death of L. Stephen Coles, is John (Johnny) M. Adams. Lead in supercentenarian research for the GRG is Robert Douglas Young.

The GRG validates the ages of supercentenarians by finding proof-of-age documents. People that have attained supercentenarian status are required to supply the organization documents that prove the persons birth date, change of name (if applicable), and date of death (if applicable), along with another piece of official government identification. Researchers from the GRG then verify that these documents are true and correct and if they are, the claimant is included in the GRG's official tables of validated supercentenarians.

The GRG also conducts research on aging by interviewing supercentenarians and collecting blood and DNA samples.

To 2015, the Gerontology Research Group found proofs of supercentenarian age for more than 2,000 people.

== See also ==
- Longevity
- New England Centenarian Study
