= Ethel =

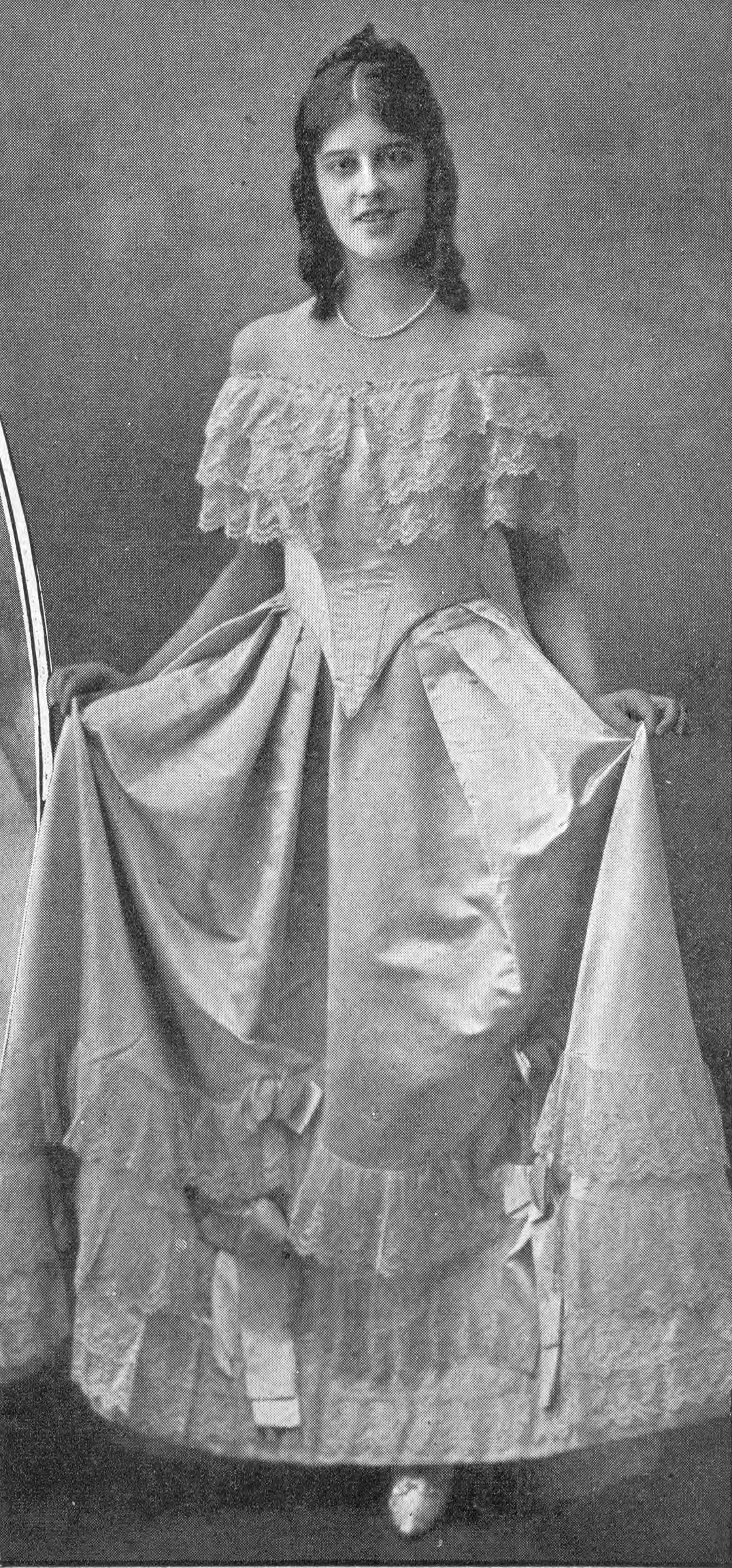
- Actress Elsie Mackay played Ethel Newcome in the play Colonel Newcome. The character inspired greater usage of the name Ethel.
- Gender: female

Origin
- Origin: Anglo-Saxon
- Meaning: noble

Ethel (also æthel) is an Old English word meaning "noble", today often used as a feminine given name.

== Etymology and historic usage ==
The word comes from the Old English word æthel, meaning "noble".

It is frequently attested as the first element in Anglo-Saxon names, both masculine and feminine, e.g. Æthelhard, Æthelred, Æthelwulf; Æthelburh, Æthelflæd, Æthelthryth (Audrey). It corresponds to the Adel- and Edel- in continental names, such as Adolf (Æthelwulf), Albert (Adalbert), Adelheid (Adelaide), Edeltraud and Edelgard.

Some of the feminine Anglo-Saxon names in Æthel- survived into the modern period (e.g. Etheldred Benett 1776–1845). Ethel was in origin used as a familiar form of such names, but it began to be used as a feminine given name in its own right beginning in the mid-19th century, gaining popularity due to characters so named in novels by William Makepeace Thackeray (The Newcomes – 1855) and Charlotte Mary Yonge (The Daisy Chain whose heroine Ethel's full name is Etheldred – 1856); the actress Ethel Barrymore – born 1879 – was named after The Newcomes character.

Notes & Queries published correspondence about the name Ethel in 1872 because it was in fashion.

The feminine name's popularity peaked in the 1890s. In the United States, it was the 7th most commonly given name for baby girls in the year 1894. Its use gradually declined during the 20th century, falling below rank 100 by 1940, and below rank 1000 in 1976.

Ethel was also occasionally used as a masculine given name during the 1880s to 1910s, but never with any frequency (never rising above rank 400, or 0.02% in popularity).

== People ==
- Ethel Afamado (born 1940), Uruguayan composer, poet, guitarist, and singer-songwriter
- Ethel D. Allen (1929–1981), the first African-American woman to serve on Philadelphia City Council
- Ethel Anderson (1883–1958), Australian poet, essayist, novelist and painter
- Ethel Percy Andrus (1884–1967), educator and founder of AARP
- Ethel Armes (1876–1945), American journalist and historian
- Ethel Armitage (1873–1957), British archer and 1908 Olympic competitor
- Ethel Arnold (1865–1930), English journalist and suffrage lecturer
- Ethel Ayler (1934–2018), American stage and film actress
- Ethel Azama (1934–1984), American jazz and popular singer
- Ethel Barrymore (1879–1959), American stage and screen actress
- Ethel Bentham (1861–1931), English doctor, politician and suffragette
- Ethel Blondin-Andrew (born 1951), Canadian politician and parliamentarian
- Ethel Booba (born 1976), Filipino comedian, TV personality, singer and author
- Ethel Branch, American attorney and politician
- Ethel Cain (born 1998), American singer-songwriter
- Ethel Carrick (1872–1952), English Post-Impressionist painter
- Ethel Caterham (born 1909), English supercentenarian, oldest British person ever, oldest living person
- Ethel Catherwood (1908–1987), Canadian high jump gold medalist in the 1928 Olympics
- Ethel Clay Price (1874–1943), American nurse and socialite
- Ethel Clayton (1882–1966), American silent-film actress
- Ethel Cox (born 1888), British suffragette
- Ethel Evans (1866–1929), American impressionist painter
- Ethel Harriet Comyns-Lewer (1861–1946), British ornithologist and periodical editor, publisher and owner
- Ethel Dovey (1882–1920), American stage actress and singer
- Ethel McGhee Davis (1899–1990), American educator, social worker, and college administrator
- Ethel Roosevelt Derby (1891–1977), younger daughter of U.S. president Theodore Roosevelt
- Ethel de Fraine (1879–1918), British botanist
- Ethel Gilbert, American expert in the risks of radiation-induced cancer
- Ethel Hillyer Harris (1859–1931), American author
- Ethel Mary Hartland (1875–1964), Welsh magistrate and activist
- Ethel Hatch (1869–1975), British muse of Lewis Carroll
- Ethel Hays (1892–1989), American cartoonist and illustrator
- Ethel Haythornthwaite (1894–1986), English environmental campaigner and a pioneer of countryside protection
- E. Ann Hoefly (1919–2003), American brigadier general
- Ethel Johnson (athlete) (1908–1964), English sprinter
- Ethel Johnson (wrestler) (1935–2018), American professional wrestler
- Ethel Kennedy (1928–2024), American widow of Robert F. Kennedy
- Ethel Lang (actress) (1902–1995), Australian actress
- Ethel Lang (supercentenarian) (1900–2015), British supercentenarian and the last Victorian
- Ethel Leach (1850 or 1851–1936), British politician
- Ethel Lote (1920–2024), British World War II nurse and yoga instructor
- Ethel MacDonald (1909–1960), Scottish anarchist, activist and propagandist
- Ethel Merman (1908–1984), American actress and singer
- Ethel Isabel Moody (1905–1941), American mathematician
- Ethel Moore (1872–1920), American civic, education, and national defense work leader
- Ethel Moustacchi (1933–2016), Egyptian-born French chemist and geneticist
- Ethel Rogers Mulvany (1904–1992), Canadian social worker and educator
- Ethel L. Payne (1911–1991), African-American journalist
- Ethel Pye (1882–1960), British sculptor and jewellery designer
- Ethel Rosenberg (1915–1953), American executed for espionage
- Ethel Ryan (1886–1971), American politician
- Ethel Schwabacher (1903–1984), American abstract expressionist painter
- Ethel Shannon (1898–1951), American silent-film actress
- Ethel Smith (organist) (1902–1996), American organist and recording artist
- Ethel Smyth (1858–1944), English composer and women's-suffrage leader
- Ethel Snowden (1881–1951), English socialist feminist and suffragist
- Ethel Spowers (1890–1947), Australian artist
- Ethel Teare (1894–1959), American silent-film actress
- Ethel Grey Terry (1882–1931), American silent-film actress
- Ethel L. M. Thorpe (1908–2001), British-Canadian nurse
- Ethel Turner (1872–1958), Australian novelist and children's writer
- Ethel Lilian Voynich (1864–1960), English novelist and musician
- Ethel Walker (1861–1951), Scottish painter
- Ethel Warwick (1882–1951), British actress and artist's model
- Ethel Waters (1896–1977), American vocalist and actress
- Ethel Wilson (1888–1980), Canadian writer

== Fictional characters ==
- Ethel Ambrewster, in the sitcom The Ropers
- Ethel Beavers, in the sitcom Parks and Recreation
- Ethel Blackmore, in the webcomic Subnormality
- Ethel Cain, from Ethel Cain's story.
- Ethel Hallow, in The Worst Witch book series by Jill Murphy
- Ethel Janowski, in the film Criminally Insane
- Ethel Mertz, in the television program I Love Lucy
- Ethel Mertz, from The Howard Stern Show
- Ethel Muggs, nicknamed Big Ethel, in Archie Comics
- Ethel Rogers, in Agatha Christie's novel And Then There Were None
- Ethel Skinner, in the British soap opera EastEnders
- Ethel Sprocket, in the Canadian animated sitcom Ricky Sprocket: Showbiz Boy
- Ethel Thayer, in the play On Golden Pond
- Silvercoat Ethel, in Xenoblade Chronicles 3
- Auntie Ethel, in Baldur's Gate 3
- Ethel, in the animated film The Garfield Movie

== See also ==
- Ætheling
- Odal (rune)
- Odal (disambiguation)
- Eth of The Glums on Take It From Here
- Ethell, a surname
- Ethelbari, a village in West Bengal, India
