= Traute =

- Gender: Female

Origin
- Origin: Old Norse
- Meaning: strength
- Region of origin: Germany and German-speaking countries

Other names
- Related names: Traudl, Trud, Trudi, Thrude, Waltraud, Edeltraud, Gertrud

Traute is a Germanic feminine given name derived from "trud" meaning "strength". The name is now most commonly found in Germany and German-speaking countries. It is often used as a diminutive of the given names ending in -traud, -traut and -trud, such as Waltraud, Edeltraud and Gertrud.

== Notable people named Traute ==
- Traute, Princess of Lippe (1925–2023), born Traute Becker, German princess
- Traute Carlsen (1882–1968), German actress
- Traute Foresti (1915–2015), Austrian poet and actress
- Traute Lafrenz (1919–2023), German-American physician and anthroposophist and member of the White Rose anti-Nazi group during World War II
- Traute Schäfer (born 1942), German volleyball player
