= Audra =

Audra may refer to:

- Audra (given name)
- Audra, West Virginia, an unincorporated community on the Middle Fork River in Barbour County, West Virginia, United States
- Audra State Park, a West Virginian state park located on 355 acres (1.44 km^{2}) of land in southwestern Barbour County, adjacent to the town of Audra
- Audra (band), an Arizona-based American musical band
