= Audrey =

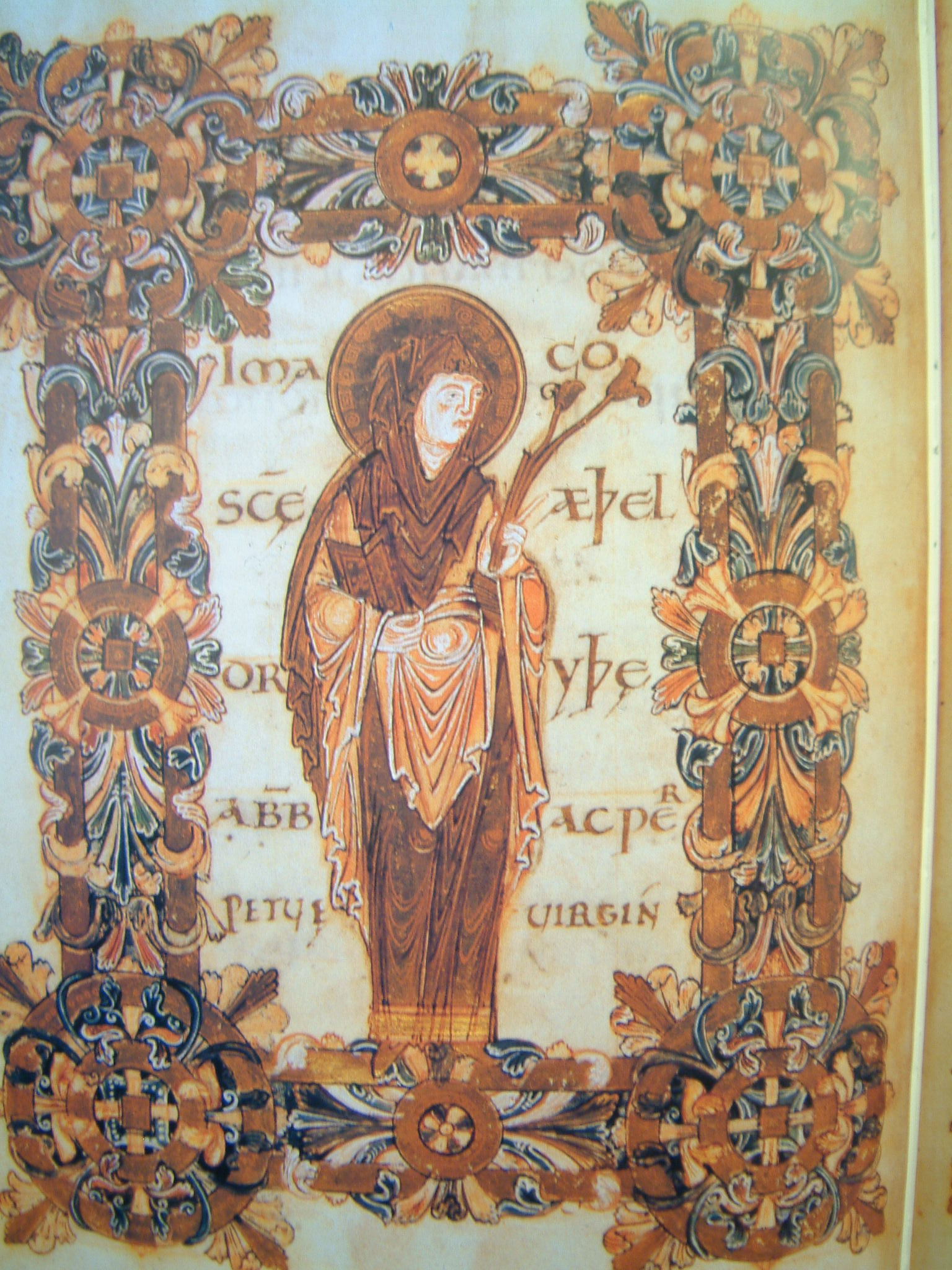
- St. Audrey, from the 10th-century Benedictional of St Æthelwold
- Pronunciation: /ˈɔːdri/
- Gender: Female, rarely male
- Language: English

Origin
- Language: Old English
- Origin: Æðelþryð
- Derivation: æðel + þryð
- Meaning: "noble strength"

Other names
- Related names: Etheldreda, Ethel, Audie, Audra, Audre, Audrea, Edeltraud

Audrey is a feminine given name. It is rarely a masculine given name. Audrey is the Anglo-Norman form of the Anglo-Saxon name Æðelþryð, composed of the elements æðel "noble" and þryð "strength". The literal definition of the word is “noble strength” or “strength from nobility”. The Anglo-Norman form of the name was applied to Saint Audrey (died 679), also known by the historical form of her name as Saint Æthelthryth. The same name also survived into the modern period in its Anglo-Saxon form, as Etheldred, e.g. Etheldred Benett (1776–1845) and Etheldred Browning (1869–1946).

In the 17th century, the name of Saint Audrey gave rise to the adjective tawdry "cheap and pretentious; cheaply adorned". The lace necklaces sold to pilgrims to Saint Audrey fell out of fashion in the 17th century, and so tawdry was reinterpreted as meaning cheap or vulgar. As a consequence, use of the name declined, but it was revived in the 19th century. Popularity of the name in the United States peaked in the interbellum period, but it fell below rank 100 in popularity by 1940 and was not frequently given in the latter half of the 20th century; Audrey was the 173rd most common name for females in the United States in the 1990 census. Its popularity has again been on the rise since the 2000s, reaching rank 100 in 2002 and rank 41 in 2012. It was also ranked in the top 100 most common names for girls in France, Belgium, and Canada in the 2000s.

== People ==
- Audrey Marie Anderson (born 1975), American actress and model
- Audrey Assad (born 1983), American contemporary Christian musician
- Audrey Amiss (1933–2013), British artist
- Audrey Azoulay (born 1972), French civil servant and politician
- Audrey Backeberg, American formerly missing person
- Audrey Bates (1922–2001), Welsh international in four sports: table tennis, tennis, squash, and lacrosse
- Audrey Bates (1928–2014), British-American computer programmer
- Audrey Brown (athlete) (1913–2005), British Olympic sprinter
- Audrey Brown (journalist), South African broadcast journalist
- Audrey Alexandra Brown (1904–1998), Canadian poet
- Audrey Cameron, polymer chemist working at the University of Edinburgh
- Audrey Chapman (1899–1993), American actress
- Audrey Crowley (born 2007), American para-alpine skier
- Audrey De Montigny (born 1985), French-Canadian singer
- Audrey Donnithorne (1922–2020), British missionary and political economist
- Audrey Dufeu-Schubert (born 1980), French politician
- Audrey Dwyer, Canadian actor and playwright
- Audrey Emerton, Baroness Emerton (1935–2026), British nursing administrator and politician
- Audrey Emery (1904–1971), American socialite and wife of Grand Duke Dmitri Pavlovich of Russia
- Audrey Fagan, Australian police officer
- Audrey Flack (1931–2024), American artist
- Audrey Fleurot (born 1977), French actress
- Audrey Girouard, Canadian computer scientist and professor
- Audrey Gordon, Canadian politician
- Audrey Gregory, Jamaican healthcare administrator
- Audrey Hannah (born 1982), German-Canadian presenter, singer-songwriter and ballet dancer
- Audrey Hepburn (1929–1993), Belgian-born British actress and fashion model
- Audrey Marie Hilley (1933–1987), American murderer
- Audrey Mika (born 2000), American singer and songwriter
- Audrey Hochberg (1933–2005), New York politician
- Audrey Evelyn Jones (1929–2014), British teacher and women's rights campaigner
- Audrey Kennedy, Irish camogie player
- Audrey Kitching (born 1985), American model, fashion designer, and fashion blogger
- Audrey Landers (born 1956), American actress
- Audrey Lawson-Johnston (1915–2001), last survivor of the shipwreck Lusitania
- Audrey Linkenheld (born 1973), French politician
- Audrey Long (1922–2014), American actress
- Audrey Luna, American operatic soprano
- Audrey McMahon (1898–1981), Federal Art Project, NY director
- Audrey Maleka, South African politician
- Audrey Malte, a name used to refer to Ethelreda Malte (died 1559), alleged illegitimate daughter of Henry VIII
- Audrey McLaughlin (born 1936), Canadian politician, former leader of the New Democratic Party
- Audrey Meadows (1922–1996), American actress
- Audrey Meaney (1931–2021), British archaeologist
- Audrey Mestre (1974–2002), French athlete
- Audrey Morris (1928–2018), American jazz singer
- Audrey Munson (1891–1996), American model and actress
- Audrey Niffenegger (born 1963), American novelist
- Audrey Nuna (born 1999), American singer
- Audrey Ong Pei Ling (born 1980), Singaporean criminal and accomplice of British convicted killer Michael McCrea
- Audrey Osborne, Duchess of Leeds, British aristocrat
- Audrey Pascual (born 2004), Spanish para-alpine skier
- Audrey Patterson (1926–1996), American athlete
- Audrey Penn (born 1947), American author
- Audrey Prime (1915–2001), British trade unionist
- Audrey Richards (1899–1984), British anthropologist
- Audrey Riley, English cellist and string arranger
- Audrey Shin (born 2004), American figure skater
- Audrey Spiry (born 1983), French animator, illustrator, and comic strip author
- Audrey Stevens, American politician
- Audrey Stevens Niyogi (1932–2010), American biochemist
- Audrey Stuckes (1923–2006), British material scientist
- Audrey Sutherland (1921–2015), American traveler, kayaker, teacher, and author
- Audrey Tang (born 1981), Taiwanese software programmer
- Audrey Tautou (born 1976), French actress
- Audrey Terras (born 1942), American mathematician
- Audrey Totter (1918–2013), American actress
- Audrey Wasilewski (born 1967), American voice actress
- Audrey Wells (1960–2018), American film director and screenwriter
- Audrey Williamson (1926–2010), British athlete
- Audrey Willis, American politician
- Audrey Whitby, American actress
- Audrey White (1927–2014), British model
- Audrey Zubiri, Filipino politician

== Fictional characters ==
- Audrey Fulquard, protagonist of Little Shop of Horrors
- Audrey fforbes-Hamilton, in the BBC television sitcom To the Manor Born
- Audrey Hanson, in the television series Heroes
- Audrey Hope, in the 2021 revival of Gossip Girl
- Audrey Horne, on the television series Twin Peaks
- Audrey Liddell, main character in the teen drama show Dawson's Creek
- Audrey Parker-Nichols, mother of the title characters' in the Nickelodeon sitcom Drake & Josh
- Audrey Raines, in television series 24
- Audrey Reede, in the film Liar Liar
- Audrey Rocio Ramirez, a character in the 2001 animated film Atlantis: The Lost Empire
- Audrey Roberts, on the British soap opera Coronation Street
- Little Audrey, a cartoon character who was mainly popular during the 1950s and 1960s
- Audrey Rose, in the musical fantasy film franchise Descendants
- Audrey Sharma, in the 2012 Disney Channel film Radio Rebel
- Audrey, Ted Wiggins' love interest in the animated film The Lorax

== See also ==
- Aubrey (name)
- Audre Lorde (1934–1992), Caribbean-American writer
- Audre Trupin, birth name of Pinny Cooke (1923–2004), New York politician
- Æthelred
- Aldred
- Atomic Weapons Detection Recognition and Estimation of Yield ( AWDREY)
