= Boulder, West Virginia =

Unincorporated community in West Virginia, United States

Boulder
- Unincorporated community
- Location within the state of West Virginia Boulder (the United States)
- Coordinates: 39°4′7″N 80°6′12″W
- Country: United States
- State: West Virginia
- County: Barbour
- Elevation: 1,378 ft (420 m)
- Time zone: UTC-5 (Eastern (EST))
  - Summer (DST): UTC-4 (EDT)
- GNIS feature ID: 1536249

Boulder is an unincorporated community in Barbour County, West Virginia, United States. It is located on county route 11 along the Buckhannon River, about three miles from the community of Audra. While the official name of the community is Boulder, by which it is usually known, the town's now-defunct post office assumed the name of Rangoon due to confusion with the town of Boulder, Colorado.

The community takes its name from natural boulders along the nearby Buckhannon River.

== See also ==
- Audra, West Virginia
- Audra State Park
