= Audra (given name) =

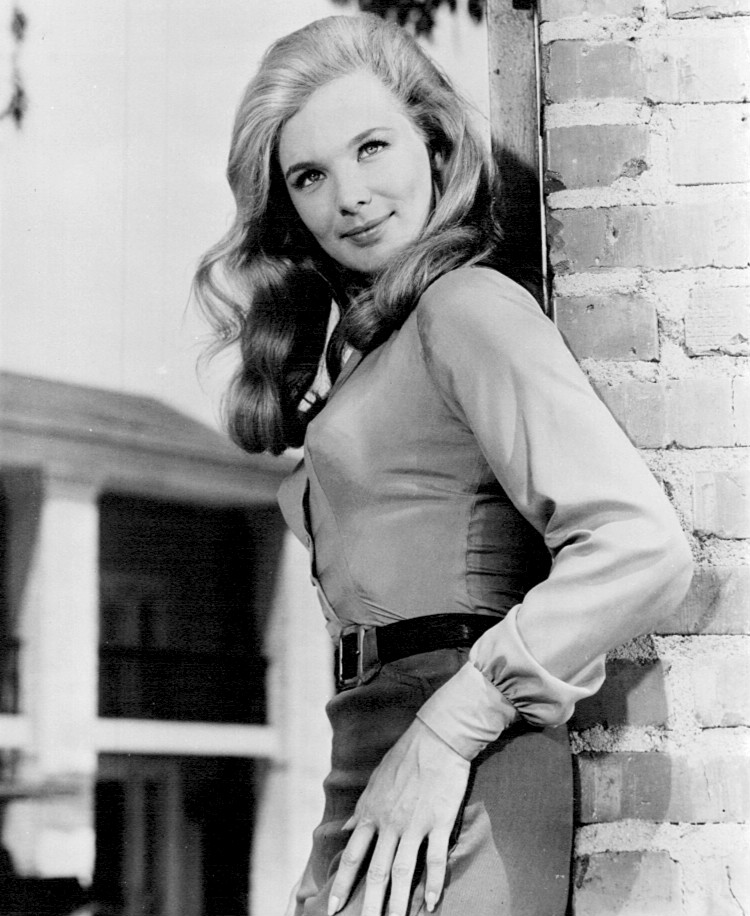
- Linda Evans portrayed Audra Barkley in the American television series The Big Valley.
- Gender: Female
- Language: English

Origin
- Meaning: noble strength

Other names
- Related names: Audrey

Audra is an English feminine given name, a modern variant of the name Audrey, which evolved from the Anglo-Saxon name Æðelþryð, which was derived from æðel, meaning noble, and þryð, meaning strength. Usage of the name Audra increased after the name was used in 1965 for the character Audra Barkley on the American television western series The Big Valley.

== People ==
- Audra Cohen (born 1986), American professional tennis player from Plantation, Florida
- Audra Levi (born 1974), American actress, singer, producer, and writer
- Audra Lindley (1918–1997), American actress, most famous for her role as landlady Helen Roper on the sitcom Three's Company
- Audra Lynn (born 1980), American model and television guest star who was Playboy magazine's Playmate of the Month for October 2003
- Audra Mae (born 1985), American singer-songwriter from Oklahoma City, Oklahoma, and the grandniece of Judy Garland
- Audra Mari (born 1994), American model and television host who was crowned Miss World America 2016
- Audra McDonald (born 1970), American actress and singer
- Audra Smith (born 1970), the head women's basketball coach at South Carolina State University
- Audra Smoke-Conner (born 1968), Cherokee politician
- Audra Strickland (born 1974), Republican politician who was a member of the California State Assembly for the 37th district from 2004 to 2010
- Audra Thomas, Northern Irish television presenter who is currently a continuity announcer and newsreader on UTV

== See also ==
- Audra (disambiguation)
