= Eva Circuit =

Cryptanalyst, SOE agent, and supercentenarian

Eva Annie Circuit MBE
- Eva Circuit in 1940
- Born: Eva Annie Thomas; 1 August 1916 (age 110 years, 113 days); Pontrhydyrun, Monmouthshire, Wales
- Education: Somerville College, University of Oxford (BA)
- Spouse: Reginald Circuit (m. 1938; died 1995)
- Children: 1
- Military career
- Allegiance: United Kingdom
- Branch: GC&CS (1940–1942); SOE (1942–1945)
- Service years: 1940–1945
- Nickname: Maretta
- Units: Bletchley Park Research Section (1940–1942); SOE F Section (1942–1945)
- Known for: Codebreaker at Bletchley Park (1940–1942); SOE Agent (1942–1945); Last living SOE Agent (since 7 October 2023); Oldest verified living Welsh-born person (since 17 December 2024); British supercentenarian (since 1 August 2026)
- Conflicts: Second World War
- Awards: Member of the Order of the British Empire; Mentioned in dispatches

Eva Annie Circuit, MBE (née Thomas; born 1 August 1916) is a British supercentenarian and former British intelligence officer. During the Second World War, she worked as a codebreaker at Bletchley Park, where she was involved in the decipherment of Italian naval and German Abwehr Enigma communications. She subsequently served as an agent of the Special Operations Executive (SOE), operating undercover in occupied France as a wireless operator and intelligence liaison with the French Resistance. In recognition of her wartime service, she was appointed a Member of the Order of the British Empire (MBE) in 1946 for services in France during the German occupation.

Her age has been validated by validated by Guinness World Records (GWR), the Gerontology Research Group (GRG), LongeviQuest (LQ), and the European Supercentenarian Organisation (ESO) She is the oldest living Welsh-born person in the world and the last surviving SOE agent. She is also among the last surviving wartime personnel of Bletchley Park and one of the last three surviving Welsh people alive during the First World War.

== Early life ==
Eva Annie Thomas was born on Tuesday, 1 August 1916 at Brook Manor, Pontrhydyrun, Monmouthshire, Wales to George James Thomas (1879–1967) and Lily Thomas (née Coles; 1886–1951). Her birth was not registered until 5 September 1916, as her parents were unsure whether she would survive or not after she caught pneumonia shortly after birth. Her father was a wealthy landowner and owned several sheet mills across Wales. Eva was the sixth of ten children, comprising of five daughters and five sons.

There is a notable history of longevity within Eva's family, with several relatives reaching advanced ages. Among her siblings, two of her brothers lived to 93, her eldest sister reached 95, and her youngest sister is still living at the age of 97. Longevity was similarly evident among her extended family: two of her uncles lived to 95 and 97, while two of her aunts reached 100 and 104. Perhaps the most remarkable examples were her maternal great-great-grandparents, Robert Coles (1806–1914) and Susanah Coles (née Thomas; 1809–1914), who lived to the ages of 107 and 105 respectively.

Eva as an infant (third from right) with her siblings in 1917.

Eva spent her early childhood at her family home, Brook Manor, in Pontrhydyrun, during the final years of the First World War and its immediate aftermath. Although too young to comprehend the conflict, she experienced its wider effects through the adults around her and the changing circumstances of wartime Britain. Following the Armistice of November 1918, the country entered a period of social and economic adjustment, compounded by the influenza pandemic of 1918–19. Eva later recalled that her earliest childhood memory is of the 1919 London Victory Parade, held on 19 July 1919 to commemorate the Allied victory in the First World War. Aged just two weeks shy of her third birthday, she recalled witnessing the thousands of Allied servicemen march through central London before enormous crowds. The procession included representatives of the British and Allied armed forces and passed the newly constructed Cenotaph in Whitehall, where the troops paid tribute to the fallen.

Eva's early education began in 1921, at the age of five, when she commenced private tuition under the family's governess, Miss Emmeline Lancaster. She continued her education at home until 1927, when, aged eleven, she was sent to Cheltenham Ladies' College, one of Britain's leading independent girls' schools. She remained there for seven years, completing her schooling in 1934. In the autumn of 1934, Eva matriculated at the University of Oxford, where she became a student of Somerville College. Specialising in Modern Languages, she pursued French and German, graduating in 1937.

Following her graduation from the University of Oxford in 1937, Eva moved to Manchester, where she established a hotel in the vicinity of the railway station. Demonstrating a considerable aptitude for business, she proved herself a capable entrepreneur at a relatively young age. It was during this period that she met her future husband, Reginald Circuit (1912–1995), who came from a prosperous farming family in Bedfordshire. His father was also a substantial investor in the railway industry.

On 27 April 1938, at the age of 21, Eva married Reginald at St Martin's Church, Fenny Stratford, Buckinghamshire.Eva later recalled that her engagement was, by her own description, "a decidedly unromantic affair". During a walk together, her future husband, apparently having given the matter some consideration, turned to her and remarked: "I'm thinking of getting married next Spring, what do you think?" Following their marriage, the couple established their home at Barnard Castle, County Durham.

== Second World War Service ==
=== Cryptanalyst at Bletchley Park ===
==== Recruitment ====
In 1940, following the outbreak of the Second World War, Eva was approached by a representative of the Government Code and Cypher School (GC&CS) and invited to undertake intelligence work at Bletchley Park, Buckinghamshire. Her academic qualifications, mathematical aptitude and fluency in French, German and Latin (which allowed her to have a basic understanding of Italian) made her a promising candidate for cryptanalytic work. Having successfully completed the necessary assessments, she was recruited as a codebreaker in May 1940 and assigned to the team of Alfred Dillwyn 'Dilly' Knox, one of Britain's leading cryptanalysts and a former classical scholar at King's College, Cambridge.

==== Italian Naval Enigma ====
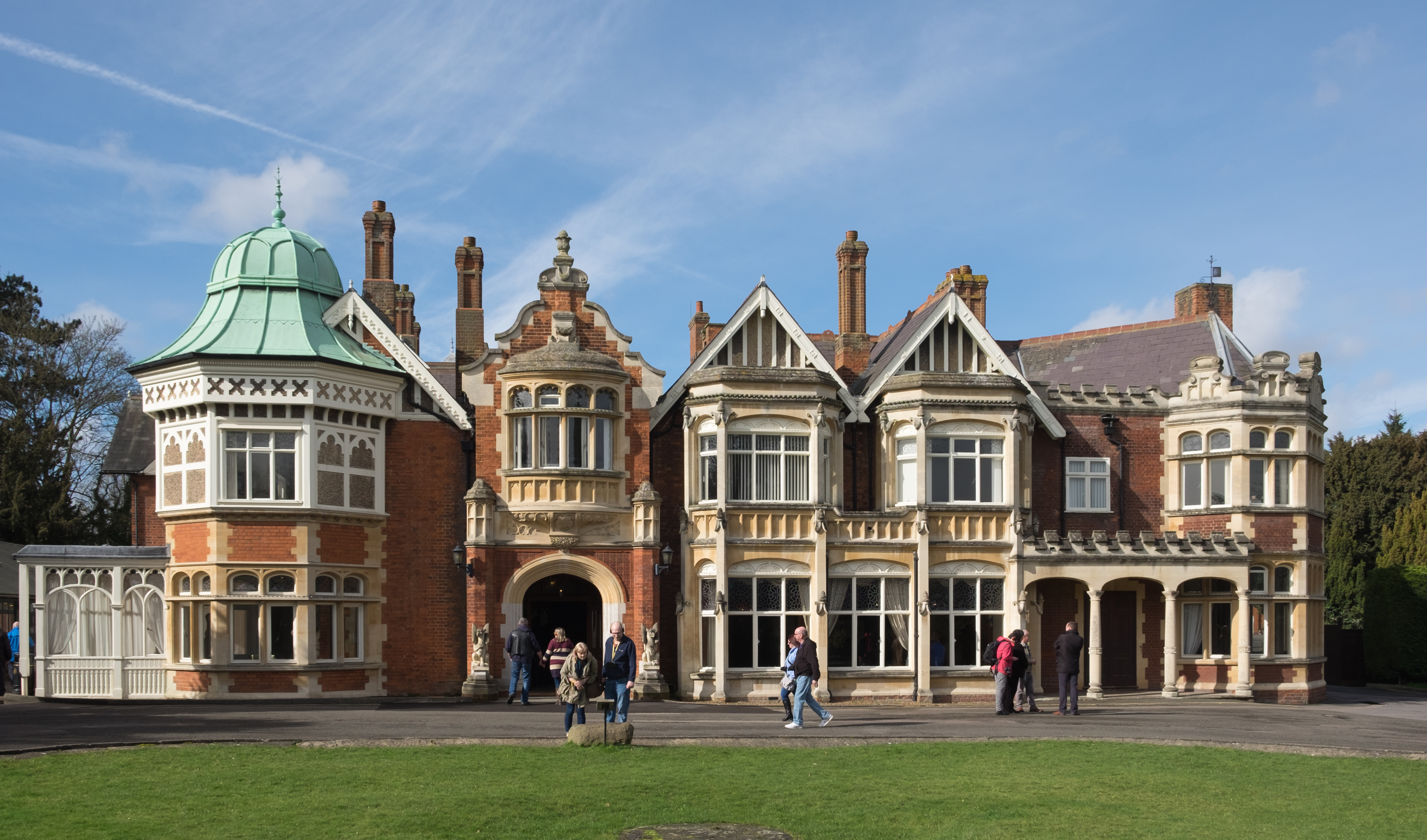
Bletchley Park Mansion, the wartime headquarters of the Government Code and Cypher School (GC&CS), where Eva served as a codebreaker between 1940 and 1942.

Eva was based at 'the Cottage', where Knox directed a small team of predominantly female codebreakers, informally known as 'Knox and his girls' or 'Dilly's Fillies'. Among her colleagues were Mavis Lever and Margaret Rock, both of whom would become prominent figures in the history of British wartime cryptanalysis. Working as an assistant to Knox, Eva helped examine intercepted encrypted communications, identify recurring patterns and linguistic clues, and test possible solutions to the Italian Navy's Enigma cipher, known as Naval Cipher D. The system was a variation of the commercial Enigma machine, notably lacking a plugboard, which made it more susceptible to cryptanalysis. The team employed techniques including 'rodding' and 'cribbing', the latter involving the identification of probable words or phrases within intercepted messages to establish possible solutions to the cipher.

==== The Battle of Cape Matapan ====
One of the team's most significant achievements came in March 1941, when its work contributed to the Allied victory at the Battle of Cape Matapan. Working alongside Lever, Rock and their other colleagues, Eva participated in the intensive decipherment of Italian naval communications, including messages containing the term 'SUPERMARINA', referring to the Italian Naval High Command. The intercepted communications revealed that the Italian fleet intended to attack a British convoy transporting supplies from Egypt to Greece. After three days and nights of intensive work, the team succeeded in deciphering messages which disclosed the detailed plans for an intended Italian operation. The intelligence was forwarded directly to Admiral Sir Andrew Cunningham, Commander-in-Chief of the Mediterranean Fleet, in Alexandria. British forces subsequently intercepted the Italian fleet in the eastern Mediterranean, inflicting substantial losses including three cruisers and two destroyers. The victory was among the earliest major demonstrations of the strategic importance of Bletchley Park's codebreaking operations. The naval historian Vincent O'Hara described the Battle of Matapan as "Italy's greatest defeat at sea, subtracting from its order of battle a cruiser division, but the battle was hardly decisive." When next in England, Admiral Cunningham visited Bletchley Park to thank Knox, and his team of code-breakers for making his victory possible.

==== Abwehr Enigma and later work ====
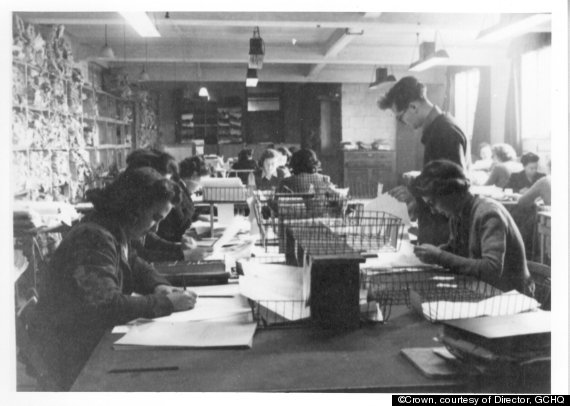
Women working at Bletchley Park.

In December 1941, Knox's team also achieved a significant breakthrough against the German Abwehr's Enigma cipher, used by the German military intelligence service. The team succeeded in deciphering an intercepted message between Belgrade and Berlin, enabling the cryptanalysts to establish the machine's internal wiring. Further breakthroughs against Abwehr Enigma subsequently allowed British intelligence to read communications concerning German assessments of Allied deception operations and the activities of double agents. Eva continued her work on these and other intelligence projects throughout 1942, as Bletchley Park's operations expanded.

Like all personnel employed at Bletchley Park, Eva signed the Official Secrets Act and was subject to strict confidentiality requirements. Staff were forbidden from discussing their work outside the establishment, and many were instructed not even to disclose their particular duties to colleagues working in other sections. Eva consequently maintained complete silence about the details of her wartime employment, including with her husband, and the rest of her family. Prime Minister Winston Churchill famously praised the codebreakers as "the geese that laid the golden eggs and never cackled", reflecting their extraordinary contribution and discretion. Eva remained largely silent about her involvement for several decades, only beginning to discuss her wartime experiences in the mid-1990s, following the gradual public disclosure of Bletchley Park's wartime achievements (beginning in 1975).

=== Special Operations Executive Agent ===
==== Recruitment ====
By the latter part of 1942, Eva's work at Bletchley Park had attracted the attention of the Special Operations Executive (SOE), particularly its French Section (F Section), headquartered in London. On 11 December 1942, she formally joined the organisation after being identified as a promising candidate for clandestine operations in occupied Europe.Her impeccable, idiomatic command of French and German, together with her mathematical abilities, academic background and previous intelligence experience, made her an unusually valuable recruit. Such a high standard of spoken French and German was relatively uncommon among the British, and her "energetic personality" further persuaded her superiors that she was well suited to the demands of undercover work.

Her initial training began in December 1942 at Winterfold House, Cranleigh, Surrey. She subsequently undertook paramilitary training at Meoble Lodge, Morar, Inverness-shire, before proceeding to wireless operator training at Thame Park, Oxfordshire, during February and March 1943. Her training covered the operation of clandestine wireless equipment, Morse code, communications security, the use of codes and ciphers, physical fitness and the practical requirements of working undercover in enemy-occupied territory. Eva distinguished herself through her determination, resourcefulness and willingness to undertake difficult assignments. Her instructors regarded her as particularly energetic and adventurous, noting an "unmistakable disregard for personal danger". Her previous experience in intelligence work also gave her a considerable advantage over many newly recruited agents.

==== Pregnancy ====
Her preparations for deployment were interrupted by an unplanned pregnancy. On 9 October 1943, she gave birth to her only child, a daughter named Janet, at the family home at Barnard Castle, County Durham. Despite the interruption to her service, Eva remained determined to return to active duty, believing that her contribution to the war effort was not yet complete. Following her recovery, she resumed preparations for an overseas assignment, undertaking further assessments and the additional training required for parachute insertion into occupied territory. Her determination to return to France eventually resulted in her being approved for an operational assignment in the spring of 1944.

==== Parachute insertion and arrival in the Sarthe ====
Westland Lysander Mk III (SD), the type used for special missions into occupied France during World War II.

On the night of 9 May 1944, Eva parachuted into occupied France as part of an SOE operation, landing in the Sarthe department of north-western France, in the countryside surrounding Le Mans. Her deployment formed part of the wider preparations for the anticipated Allied invasion of western Europe. She was assigned to assist a local F Section resistance circuit, where her principal responsibility was to establish and maintain wireless communications between the French Resistance and SOE headquarters in London. Her arrival came at a particularly important moment in the war. By the spring of 1944, Allied preparations for the invasion of Normandy were well advanced, and the British and American authorities were increasingly dependent upon intelligence gathered by resistance organisations operating throughout occupied France. The Germans maintained extensive military installations, transport networks and communications infrastructure across the country, and the Allies needed accurate information about their movements and defensive arrangements before the invasion began.

Following her landing, Eva was received by local Resistance contacts who helped her leave the drop zone and reach a temporary safe house. Her equipment and supplies had been delivered as part of the parachute operation. She was subsequently introduced to the members of the local circuit with whom she would work, including its organiser and several trusted couriers and resistance representatives.

For security reasons, Eva operated under an assumed French identity, supported by forged identification papers and a carefully constructed cover story. Her cover story was that she was a French clerical assistant from La Flèche who had returned to the Sarthe following the disruption of her employment during the occupation. Her forged documents said her name was Madeleine Delaunay. Her command of French allowed her to speak naturally with the local population and avoid the linguistic difficulties that sometimes exposed British agents. Her German was equally valuable, particularly when interpreting information concerning the occupation authorities and understanding conversations, notices and announcements made by German personnel.

==== Establishing communications with London ====
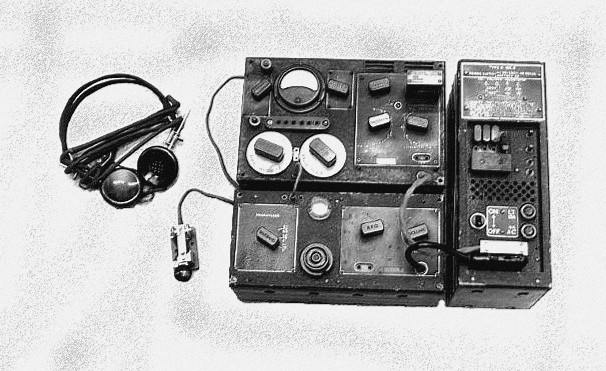
B MK II receiver and transmitter (also known as the B2 radio set).

One of Eva's first responsibilities was to establish a clandestine wireless station. She was equipped with a portable SOE transmitter and receiver, a Type 3 Mark II, commonly known as the B2 suitcase wireless set, which was widely used by British agents operating in France. The equipment allowed her to communicate with British receiving stations using Morse code. Messages were encrypted before transmission, and she was responsible for ensuring that information could be transmitted accurately and securely. The wireless set required a suitable power supply and aerial, meaning that its operation involved considerable practical difficulties. The station had to be concealed in a location that offered sufficient privacy while allowing her to transmit reliably to Britain. Her code name was Maretta.

Eva initially operated from a safe house in the rural countryside outside Le Mans, where the inhabitants were sympathetic to the Resistance. Her wireless equipment was kept concealed when not in use, and transmissions were undertaken with considerable caution. She was required to keep her messages brief, avoid establishing predictable transmission patterns and change locations whenever there was reason to suspect that German security personnel had detected her signals. The danger was considerable. German counter-intelligence services employed radio direction-finding equipment to locate clandestine transmitters, and an operator who remained at one location for too long risked exposing both herself and the entire resistance circuit. The discovery of her wireless equipment could also provide the Germans with access to encryption material, operational instructions and the identities of other agents.

Her principal task was to maintain the communications link between the local Resistance and SOE headquarters. She received instructions from London, acknowledged messages, transmitted intelligence reports and communicated requests for supplies and equipment. Her previous experience at Bletchley Park gave her a particular appreciation of the importance of coded communications, accuracy and intelligence security.

==== Intelligence gathering before D-Day ====
During May 1944, Eva concentrated on establishing her network of contacts and gathering information about German military activity in the Sarthe. The area surrounding Le Mans was of considerable strategic importance because the city was a major railway and road junction, connecting western France with central and northern regions of the country.German military formations and supplies moved through the wider transport network, making information about railway traffic and road movements valuable to Allied planners.

Working with local Resistance members, Eva helped collect intelligence from railway employees, farmers, tradesmen and other inhabitants whose occupations allowed them to observe German activity without attracting immediate suspicion.Information was gathered about the movement of military trains, the presence of German vehicles, the requisitioning of buildings, military installations and changes in transport arrangements. Railway workers were particularly valuable informants. Their knowledge of timetables, railway infrastructure and the movement of military trains could provide information that would otherwise be difficult for British intelligence to obtain. Eva helped collate these reports and prepare them for transmission to London, distinguishing between directly observed activity and information that required further confirmation. The Le Mans railway network was especially relevant. German forces depended upon rail transport to move personnel, equipment and supplies throughout occupied France. Any disruption to these routes could complicate military movements and delay the arrival of reinforcements at strategically important locations. Eva therefore helped gather information about railway junctions, bridges, sidings and the frequency of military traffic.

Her circuit also monitored road movements, particularly the passage of German military convoys and supply vehicles.Local contacts reported the direction of travel, approximate size and composition of convoys, where this could be established, and the roads being used. Such information was transmitted to London and contributed to the wider Allied intelligence picture. The information gathered was not limited to military transport. Eva also helped collect reports concerning German occupation personnel, communications facilities, defensive preparations and the location of military installations. Her ability to speak German was particularly useful when interpreting German notices and documents obtained by local contacts.

==== D-Day and the intensification of Resistance activity ====
Normandy Invasion, June 1944. USS Augusta (CA-31) off French Invasion coast, probably Omaha Beach, during landing operations.

On 6 June 1944, the Allied invasion of Normandy began. The landings marked the opening of the liberation of western Europe, and SOE's work with the French Resistance became increasingly important. In the days immediately preceding the invasion, the BBC had broadcast a series of coded messages intended for Resistance organisations throughout France. These messages instructed agents and resistance groups to implement previously arranged sabotage plans. Among the principal Allied plans were Plan Vert, directed against railway infrastructure, Plan Violet, concerned with long-distance telephone communications, and Plan Bibendum, which targeted road transport.

Following the invasion, Eva's responsibilities intensified. She helped maintain the wireless link with London, transmitting reports about German military movements and the activities of local Resistance groups. The information was particularly important as German formations attempted to reinforce their positions in Normandy and respond to the advancing Allied armies.

The Resistance was encouraged to disrupt German transport and communications wherever possible. Eva assisted in coordinating the passage of instructions to local groups and transmitting information about railway movements, telephone communications and other infrastructure. Resistance members undertook sabotage against railway lines, telecommunications cables and transport facilities, making it more difficult for the Germans to move reinforcements and maintain communications. Eva was not herself responsible for commanding sabotage operations or selecting military targets. Her role was principally one of intelligence and communications, ensuring that information gathered by local groups could reach the appropriate Allied authorities and that instructions from London could be passed to those who needed them.

She also helped coordinate the movement of weapons, ammunition and other supplies delivered to the Resistance through clandestine Allied air drops. These operations required suitable landing and dropping areas, reliable local reception parties and secure communications with the British authorities. Eva's wireless training made her particularly useful in arranging communications surrounding supply operations, although the authorisation and organisation of individual drops remained the responsibility of SOE headquarters and the relevant circuit leadership.

==== Life undercover and the dangers of clandestine service ====
Eva's existence in occupied France was characterised by secrecy, frequent movement and the constant possibility of arrest. She could not openly acknowledge her British nationality, her association with SOE or the purpose of her activities. Her assumed identity had to withstand ordinary questioning and scrutiny by German soldiers, French police and collaborators. She travelled between safe houses, meeting places and Resistance contacts, often using a bicycle or public transport. Her movements had to appear entirely ordinary, and she avoided repeatedly visiting the same locations or establishing routines that might attract suspicion. She relied upon trusted local inhabitants for accommodation, food and information, frequently staying in private homes and rural properties rather than commercial hotels.

Her wireless equipment was particularly difficult to conceal. Although the B2 transmitter was designed to be portable, the complete apparatus weighed approximately 13.5–15 kg and consisted of several separate components, including a receiver, transmitter, power supply and accessories. Its discovery would have provided the Germans with potentially devastating evidence of her activities. She therefore had to take precautions when transporting it and operating her station. The threat of capture was ever-present, particularly because German security services actively investigated and arrested members of the Resistance. British agents could face interrogation, imprisonment and torture if discovered. Eva was trained to protect the identities of her contacts and to disclose as little operational information as possible if arrested.

Her linguistic abilities were an important advantage. She could converse naturally in French and German and was capable of understanding Italian, allowing her to respond more convincingly to questioning and recognise potentially dangerous situations. Nevertheless, even a fluent speaker could not eliminate the risk of discovery, particularly when carrying false papers or operating clandestine radio equipment. Her earlier intelligence work had also taught her the importance of compartmentalisation: knowing only what was necessary for her own assignment and avoiding unnecessary knowledge of other agents' activities. This was particularly important in France, where the arrest of one individual could expose an entire network.

==== The liberation of the Sarthe ====
During July 1944, Eva continued to support the Resistance as Allied forces consolidated their position in Normandy and began advancing further into France. The local circuit remained involved in intelligence gathering and communications, while the wider Resistance campaign continued to disrupt German transport and military activity.

By early August, the Allied advance had reached the Sarthe. On 5 August, Allied forces entered the department from the west, liberating several communities as they advanced towards Le Mans. German forces began withdrawing from the area, while Allied aircraft and ground forces placed increasing pressure on their movements. During the night of 7–8 August, German forces destroyed bridges in Le Mans in an attempt to impede the Allied advance. Five young Frenchmen succeeded in saving the Pont Gambetta by removing its demolition charges. At approximately 3 p.m. on 8 August, the French tricolour was raised over Le Mans Cathedral, marking the liberation of the city. American troops were subsequently welcomed by the population in the Place de la République.

The changing military situation brought Eva's original assignment towards its conclusion. With the German occupation of the region collapsing, the clandestine network that had operated under occupation conditions could increasingly emerge into the open. Resistance members who had spent months working secretly were increasingly able to assist the advancing Allied forces directly, providing local intelligence, identifying German positions, protecting important installations and helping restore security in liberated communities. Eva's wireless work remained important during the transition, as communications continued to be required to report the changing situation and pass information concerning German movements and the condition of local infrastructure. Once the immediate operational requirements of her circuit had diminished, she could make contact with Allied personnel and account for her activities, although the precise timing and circumstances of her withdrawal would depend on the orders issued by SOE headquarters.

==== Return to Britain ====
Eva following her return to Britain from occupied France, in 1944.

Following the liberation of Le Mans on 8 August 1944, Eva's work in the Sarthe entered its final phase. With German forces retreating and the local Resistance increasingly able to operate openly, the circumstances that had made her clandestine wireless mission necessary were rapidly changing. Having spent the preceding months maintaining communications with London, gathering information on German activity and supporting the local Resistance, her original assignment was gradually brought to a close. The withdrawal of SOE agents and circuits was generally determined by operational requirements and orders from London, rather than following an automatic procedure upon the liberation of a particular area.

In October 1944, with most of France liberated, Eva returned to England through the appropriate Allied and SOE arrangements. Before leaving France, she ensured that the remaining information gathered during her mission had been passed on to the relevant authorities and that responsibility for any outstanding operational matters had been handed over. Agents returning from the field could be required to provide detailed accounts of their experiences and activities, forming part of SOE's wider assessment of its operations.

Eva had completed her assignment without being captured by German forces. Her survival was notable given the dangers faced by SOE personnel in occupied France, where agents and their Resistance contacts were exposed to surveillance, wireless detection, betrayal, arrest and execution. Although the precise circumstances of her departure and return would be recorded in her individual service and operational files, her time in France marked the conclusion of a demanding period of clandestine service.

==== Later wartime service ====
Upon her return, Eva underwent an extensive debriefing by F Section, during which she provided an account of her activities in France, her dealings with the local Resistance, the intelligence she had transmitted to London and the security arrangements surrounding her wireless operations. Particular attention was paid to the information she had gathered concerning German military movements, railway traffic and communications infrastructure, as well as the condition of the Resistance network in the Sarthe. Her experience provided valuable insight into the practical difficulties encountered by wireless operators working behind enemy lines.

After a period of recuperation, Eva was retained by F Section and returned to work in London in January 1945. Rather than being sent on another overseas mission, she was assigned to intelligence and communications duties at SOE headquarters. Her experience as a field wireless operator, combined with her earlier work at Bletchley Park, made her particularly useful in this capacity. She assisted with the examination and assessment of intelligence reports received from agents operating in occupied Europe, helped interpret German-language material and contributed to the preparation of operational briefings. She also advised on wireless security and the practical challenges of maintaining communications with London while working under the constant threat of German radio direction-finding.

During the final months of the European war, Eva continued to serve with the organisation, assisting with the assessment of intelligence as Allied forces advanced through occupied Europe and into Germany. The liberation of France and the subsequent collapse of German occupation across much of Western Europe fundamentally altered the nature of SOE's work. Increasingly, its attention turned towards the conclusion of existing operations, the recovery and identification of missing agents, and the collection of intelligence concerning German military and security organisations. Eva's linguistic abilities and familiarity with German communications made her well suited to this work.

Following Germany's unconditional surrender in May 1945, Eva remained involved in the final stages of wartime intelligence work, assisting with the examination of information gathered during the conflict and the processing of German-language material. She continued in this capacity until the summer of 1945, when her active service with the SOE came to an end as the organisation began winding down its wartime operations.

== Postwar life ==
=== After the War ===
Following the conclusion of the Second World War in 1945, Eva and her husband, Reginald, settled into civilian life in the village of Launton, Oxfordshire, where they established their family home at the Old Rectory. Having spent much of the preceding years engaged in intelligence work, first at Bletchley Park and subsequently in occupied France with the Special Operations Executive, Eva chose not to pursue a further professional career. Instead, she devoted herself to family life and the upbringing of their young daughter, Janet. After years in which her movements, correspondence and daily activities had been governed by the requirements of wartime secrecy, the relative tranquillity of domestic life represented a considerable change of pace.

Reginald, who had served with the 10th Royal Hussars during the war, embarked on a career as a solicitor, specialising in commercial law, following his return to civilian life. He continued this for the remainder of his professional career, eventually rising to the position of senior partner. His work provided the family with a comfortable and secure standard of living, allowing Eva considerable freedom to pursue her own interests without the necessity of paid employment.

The Old Rectory became the centre of Eva's domestic and social life. She employed several domestic servants, benefiting from assistance with the running of the household and allowing her to devote much of her time to family, friends and leisure. She enjoyed a comfortably privileged country lifestyle, dividing her time between the house and garden, social engagements and occasional visits to London. She was particularly fond of gardening, taking an interest in the maintenance and appearance of the grounds surrounding the Old Rectory. The house also provided a setting for entertaining friends and relatives, and remained her principal home for the next 77 years.

Eva maintained a remarkably varied range of interests. Among her pastimes were fencing, cycling, tennis, swimming and gardening, while she also enjoyed playing the piano. She particularly appreciated outdoor activities and retained an enthusiasm for keeping active throughout much of her adult life. Her interests reflected a combination of physical recreation and more traditional pursuits, and she was rarely short of something with which to occupy herself.

She also developed a considerable enthusiasm for travel, undertaking numerous journeys both with her daughter, Janet, and with friends. Between 1963 and 2005, her travels took her across Europe and further afield, including visits to Belgium, Spain, Portugal, Denmark, Romania, Brazil, Liechtenstein and Malta. She enjoyed experiencing different countries, their customs and their cultures, and continued travelling well into later life.

In 1985, Eva was appointed President of her local Women's Institute (WI), an organisation with which she became closely associated. She held the position for an extraordinary 33 years, remaining in office until 2018. During this time, she became a familiar and longstanding figure within the local organisation, taking part in its activities and community initiatives and helping to maintain its social character. The Women's Institute provided her with a regular opportunity to meet others, participate in village life and maintain friendships within the local community.

Eva also possessed a number of personal habits that remained with her for decades. She was a smoker for much of her adult life, but eventually gave up during the 1980s, reportedly deciding that cigarettes had become too expensive to justify the continued habit.She also developed a fondness for a glass of champagne in the evening, which has become something of a daily ritual before retiring for the night. Dark chocolate is another particular favourite.

On 8 February 1995, Reginald passed away from leukaemia, aged 82, just two months shy of their 57th wedding anniversary. Through Janet, Eva became a grandmother to two grandchildren and subsequently a great-grandmother to three great-grandchildren.

=== Centenarian Years ===
Eva celebrated her 100th birthday on 1 August 2016, becoming a centenarian. In September 2023, having lived on her own until the age of 107, she moved into a nursing home in Cheltenham to be closer to her daughter after suffering a serious fall at her home.

Eva at age 102 in 2018.

On 7 October 2023, following the death of 102-year-old Phyllis Latour (1921–2023), Eva became the last surviving SOE agent, aged 107 years, 67 days. Following the death of 112-year-old Mary Keir (1912–2024) on 17 December 2024, Eva, aged 108 years, 138 days, became the oldest living Welsh-born person in the world.

On 1 August 2026, Eva celebrated her 110th birthday, becoming a supercentenarian. Her age has subsequently been validated by Guinness World Records (GWR), the Gerontology Research Group (GRG), LongeviQuest (LQ),and the European Supercentenarian Organisation (ESO), four organisations involved in the verification and documentation of exceptional human longevity. Reaching the age of 110 placed her among a particularly small group of people worldwide to have attained supercentenarian status. Only 1 in 1000 centenarians live to their 110th birthday.

As of 22 November 2026, aged 110 years, 113 days, Eva is the thirty-eighth-oldest living person in Europe, the twelfth-oldest living person in the United Kingdom, the oldest living Welsh-born person in the world and the last surviving SOE agent. She is also one of the last surviving individuals who worked at Bletchley Park during the Second World War, alongside fellow codebreaker Patricia Davies (b. 19 June 1923). Additionally, she is one of the last three surviving Welsh citizens alive during World War I, alongside Bessie Fisher (b. 30 August 1917) and Beryl Gratton (b. 19 July 1918), and the second-oldest ever holder of an MBE, behind 111-year-old Anne Baker (1914–2025).

== Honours and awards ==
On 19 February 1946 Eva was appointed a Member of the Order of the British Empire (MBE) by King George VI for "services in France during the enemy occupation". She also received a Mention in Dispatches (MiD).

Order of the British Empire (Member)	1939–1945 Service Star	War Medal with Mentioned in Dispatches

== See Also ==
- Supercentenarian
- List of British Supercentenarians
- List of European Supercentenarians
- Women in Bletchley Park
- Special Operations Executive
- Order of the British Empire
