= Ethel Lang =

Ethel Lang may refer to:

- Ethel Lang (actress), (1902-1995) Australian actress
- Ethel Lang (supercentenarian) (1900-2015) British supercentenarian
