= Etheldreda (given name) =

- Gender: female
- Language: English

Origin
- Language: Old English
- Meaning: noble strength

Other names
- Related names: Audrey, Audra, Audie
- See also: Etheldred

Etheldreda is an English feminine given name of Old English origin, Æðelþryð, signified ''noble, strength''.

Notable people named Ethelreda, Etheldreda or Etheldritha include:

- Æthelthryth (c. 636–679), also known as Ethelreda, Anglo-Saxon saint, East Anglian princess, a Fenland and Northumbrian queen and Abbess of Ely
- Ælfthryth of Crowland (died c. 835), also known as Etheldritha, Anglo-Saxon saint, daughter of King Offa of Mercia
- Ethelreda (daughter of Gospatric), 11th century daughter of Gospatric, Earl of Northumbria, and wife of Duncan II of Scotland
- Ethelreda Ethel Baxter (1883–1963), Scottish cook and businesswoman
- Etheldreda Laing (1872–1960), British photographer
- Ethelreda Leopold (1914–1998), American film actress
- Ethelreda Malte (c. 1527/35–c. 1559), English courtier reputed to be an illegitimate daughter of King Henry VIII
- Etheldreda Nakimuli-Mpungu (born 1974), Ugandan professor, researcher, epidemiologist and psychiatrist
- Etheldreda Townshend (1708–1788), English society hostess
- Etheldreda, a character in the Demonbane visual novel, anime and manga series Demonbane

== See also ==
- Æthelred
