= Shipton Bellinger =

Village and parish in Hampshire, England

Coordinates: 51.207°N 1.669°W

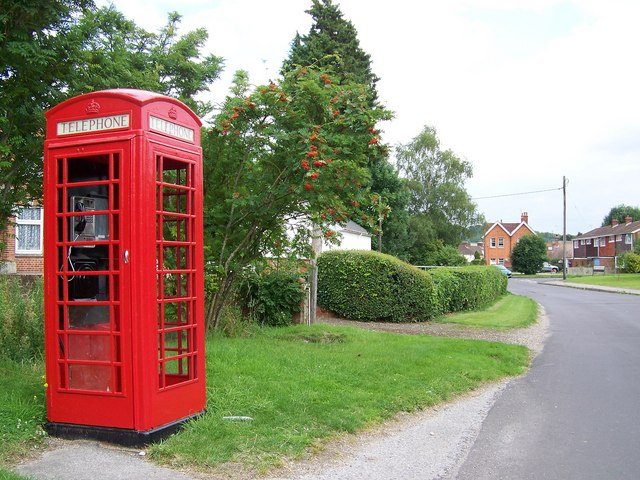

- Location within Hampshire
- Population: 1,504 (2011 Census)
- OS grid reference: SU231454
- Civil parish: Shipton Bellinger
- District: Test Valley
- Shire county: Hampshire
- Region: South East
- Country: England
- Sovereign state: United Kingdom
- Post town: TIDWORTH
- Postcode district: SP9
- Dialling code: 01980
- Police: Hampshire and Isle of Wight
- Fire: Hampshire and Isle of Wight
- Ambulance: South Central
- UK Parliament: Romsey and Southampton North
- Website: Parish council

Shipton Bellinger is a village and civil parish in Hampshire, England. It is about 5 miles (8 km) north-east of Amesbury and 12 miles (19 km) north-east of Salisbury, situated on the A338 road near its junction with the A303 road. The village lies within the Test Valley district, but its post town is Tidworth in Wiltshire. It is located on the edge of Salisbury Plain and close to Tidworth Camp.

A number of British Army families live in the village due to its proximity to military facilities. Notable features include the Norman Church of England parish church of Saint Peter and the nearby River Bourne.

Village amenities include a public house, a sports and social club, a village shop with a visiting mobile post office, a primary school, a village hall, and a garage.

== Notable people ==
- Ethel Caterham (born 1909), supercentenarian, oldest Briton ever, current oldest living person and last surviving Edwardian. Born in Shipton Bellinger.
