= Hilda Clulow =

British supercentenarian (1908–2019)

- Born: Hilda May Heath; 15 March 1908; Selly Park, Birmingham, United Kingdom
- Died: 24 December 2019 (aged 111); Redditch, Worcestershire, United Kingdom
- Citizenship: United Kingdom
- Occupation: Dressmaker
- Known for: Oldest living person in the United Kingdom (October - December 2019)
- Spouse: Arthur Clulow (m. 1937)
- Children: 1

Hilda May Clulow (née Heath; 15 March 1908 – 24 December 2019) was a British supercentenarian who was the oldest known living person in the United Kingdom from October to December 2019.

== Biography ==
Hilda May Heath was born on 15 March 1908 in Selly Park, Birmingham, England, and was one of six siblings. She began working as a dressmaker at the Balsall Heath Factory at the age of 16 and continued there until her retirement at 60.

In 1937, she married Arthur Clulow, with whom she had one son, Barry. She had two grandchildren and six great-grandchildren. In later life, she resided at Bowood Court & Mews Care Home in Redditch, Worcestershire.

=== Longevity ===
Clulow became the oldest known living person in the United Kingdom in October 2019, following the death of 112-year-old Gwen Payne. She celebrated her 111th birthday in March 2019 with a 1940s-themed party. Clulow died on 24 December 2019 in Redditch at the age of 111 years and 284 days. Her age was validated by the Gerontology Research Group in 2024.

== See also ==
- List of British supercentenarians
