= Æthelred =

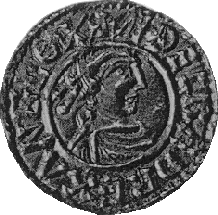
- circa 870
- Pronunciation: [ˈæːðelræːd]
- Gender: Unisex (mostly masculine)
- Languages: Old Latin, Old German, Old English, Danish

Origin
- Language: Anglo-Saxon
- Origin: Conquest
- Meaning: "noble counsel"
- Region of origin: Celtic and Saxon

Other names
- Related names: Ethelred, Aethelred, Aelred, Aðalráðr

Æthelred (/ˈæθəlrɛd/; Old English: Æþelræd [ˈæðelræːd]) or Ethelred (/ˈɛθəlrɛd/) is an Old English personal name (a compound of æþele and ræd, meaning "noble counsel" or "well-advised") and may refer to:

== Anglo-Saxon England ==
- Æthelred and Æthelberht, legendary princes of Kent
- Æthelred of Mercia (fl. 645–709), King of Mercia
- Æthelred I (disambiguation), several kings
- Æthelred II (disambiguation), several kings
- Æthelred Mucel (fl. 840–895), father of King Alfred the Great's wife, Ealhswith
- Æthelred (archbishop) (fl. 870–888), Archbishop of Canterbury
- Æthelred, Lord of the Mercians (fl. 881–911)
- Æthelred of Cornwall (fl. 1001), Bishop of Cornwall
- Æthelred the Unready (978–1016), King of England

== Post-Conquest ==
- Ethelred of Scotland (fl. 1093), son of Malcolm III and Saint Margaret
- Aelred of Rievaulx (1110–1167), English writer, saint and abbot of Rievaulx
- Ethelred Taunton (1857–1907), English Roman Catholic priest and historical writer
- Aethelred Eldridge (1930–2018), American academic and painter

== See also ==
- Ethelreda (given name)
