= Florence Pannell =

British supercentenarian (1868–1980)

- Pannell on Money-Go-Round (1977)
- Born: Florence Ada Bethia Neate; December 26, 1868; Kensington London, England
- Died: October 20, 1980 (aged 111 years, 299 days); Kensington, London, England
- Occupation: Businesswoman
- Title: Britain's oldest living person
- Predecessor: Lilias Williams
- Successor: Jeanetta Thomas
- Spouse: Robert Henry Pannell (m. 1898; died 1905)
- Children: 1

Florence Ada Bethia Pannell (née Neate; December 26, 1868 – October 20, 1980) was a British beauty care businesswoman and supercentenarian, whose age of 111 years and 299 days has been validated by the European Supercentenarian Organisation and the Gerontology Research Group. At the time of her death, she was the oldest living person in Britain and in Europe overall.

Her only public appearance recorded on tape was a 1977 interview by Joan Shenton on Thames Television's Money-Go-Round.

== See also ==
- List of British supercentenarians
