= Charlotte Hughes (supercentenarian) =

British supercentenarian (1877–1993)

- Born: Charlotte Marion Milburn; 1 August 1877; Hartlepool, County Durham, England
- Died: 17 March 1993 (aged 115 years, 228 days); Redcar, North Yorkshire, England
- Known for: Oldest British person ever (26 February 1992 — 7 April 2025); Oldest living person in the United Kingdom (5 September 1988 — 17 March 1993)
- Spouse: Noel Hughes (m. 1940; died 1979)

Charlotte Marion Hughes (née Milburn; 1 August 1877 – 17 March 1993) was a British supercentenarian who, at the age of 115 years, 228 days, is the second longest-lived person ever documented from the United Kingdom.

== Biography ==
Born in Hartlepool, she lived under the rule of six monarchs and 24 UK Prime Ministers. Hughes grew up in Middlesbrough in Yorkshire, where her father ran a music shop. She worked as a teacher in a primary school from the age of thirteen and married Noel Hughes, a retired army captain, after she retired aged 63. They remained married until his death in 1979 at the age of 88. Her father, Herbert Milburn, died at age 93, while her mother, Annie, died at 92. She had three younger brothers, all of whom pre-deceased her.

She remained in good health into extreme old age and achieved public recognition for her longevity, including tea with then-UK Prime Minister Margaret Thatcher, in 1985, whom she jokingly admonished against cuddling up to her, as Hughes was a Labour Party supporter. Thatcher replied by saying "Oh well, never mind, let's have a cup of tea." However, Hughes admitted to personally liking Thatcher, and she described the Prime Minister as "a very nice woman." For her 110th birthday, she flew on Concorde to New York City, one of only two supercentenarian air passengers ever recorded. She stayed at The Waldorf-Astoria Hotel for four days, on an all-expenses-paid visit, and met then-Mayor Ed Koch.

Hughes became the oldest living person in the United Kingdom when Kate Begbie of Scotland died in 1988, and she broke the national longevity record, held until then by Anna Eliza Williams, in early 1992. Hughes lived in her own home in Marske-by-the-Sea until 1991, when she moved to a nursing home in Redcar due to her becoming too frail to look after herself. She also spent her final years in a wheelchair, although she remained mentally alert and sharp to the end of her life. She was described by relatives as "extremely domineering, outspoken, and sharp; but also as friendly and witty."

Hughes was never interviewed by demographers or other longevity researchers, though the historian Peter Laslett went through the documentation pertaining to her case.

Her record as the United Kingdom's oldest ever person stood for 33 years before being broken by Ethel Caterham, currently the world's oldest living person, on 7 April 2025.
