= Waltraud =

Waltraud or Waltraut is a German feminine given name. Notable people with the name include:

== People named Waltraud ==
- Waltraud Dietsch (born 1950), German sprinter who specialized in the 400 metres
- Waltraud Kretzschmar (1948–2018), East German handball player
- Waltraud Meier (born 1956), Grammy Award-winning German dramatic soprano and mezzo-soprano singer
- Waltraud Pöhlitz (born 1942), German middle-distance runner who specialized in the 800 metres
- Waltraud Schale, East German slalom canoeist who competed in the late 1950s
- Waltraud Schoppe, (born 1942) German politician
- Waltraud Strotzer (born 1952), German middle-distance runner who specialized in the 800 metres

== People named Waltraut ==
- Waltraut Cooper (born 1937), Austrian artist
- Waltraut Grassl, Czechoslovak luger, active in the late 1930s
- Waltraut Haas (1927–2025), Austrian actress and singer
- Waltraut Peck-Repa (1940–1998), Austrian foil fencer and academic artist
- Waltraut Schälike (1927–2021), Soviet-Russian scientist of German origin, historian and philosopher
- Waltraut Seitter (1930–2007), German astronomer

== Fictional characters ==
- Waltraud Nowotny, a fictional character from Strike Witches
