= Mary Keir =

Welsh supercentenarian (1912–2024)

- Born: 3 March 1912; St Davids, Pembrokeshire, Wales
- Died: 17 December 2024 (aged 112 years, 289 days); Llandeilo, Carmarthenshire, Wales
- Occupation: Nurse
- Known for: Oldest living person in Wales (9 September 2021 – 17 December 2024)
- Children: 1

Mary Keir (3 March 1912 – 17 December 2024) was a Welsh supercentenarian who, until her death, was the oldest living person in Wales and the second oldest living person in the United Kingdom, after Ethel Caterham.

== Biography ==
Keir was born in St Davids, Pembrokeshire.

At age 21 she moved to Cardiff to work at Llandough Hospital where she worked as a ward sister. She worked in the hospital during World War II and survived the Cardiff Blitz. After meeting her husband Douglas, she moved to Llansteffan, Carmarthenshire, where she worked as a ward sister and district nurse. She lived in Llansteffan independently until just before her 100th birthday.

Keir lived at Awel Tywi Residential Home in Llandeilo, Carmarthenshire for 12 years until her death. She enjoyed music and was a pianist. She was survived by her son.

== See also ==
- List of British supercentenarians
