= Adolph, West Virginia =

Unincorporated community in West Virginia, United States

- Unincorporated community
- Location within West Virginia Location within the United States
- Coordinates: 38°44′40″N 80°2′44″W
- Country: United States
- State: West Virginia
- County: Randolph
- Elevation: 2,313 ft (705 m)
- Time zone: UTC-5 (Eastern (EST))
  - Summer (DST): UTC-4 (EDT)
- GNIS feature ID: 1553697

Adolph is an unincorporated community in Randolph County, West Virginia, United States. Originally known as West Huttonsville, Adolph was named by the Board on Geographic Names in 1977. The first settlement at Adolph was made in the early 1880s. Adolph is located on Helvetia-Adolph Road, at the confluence where Kittle Creek and Birch Fork join to form the Middle Fork River.
