= Æthelred I (disambiguation) =

Æthelred I or Ethelred I may refer to:

- Æthelred I of Wessex, King of Wessex from 865 to 871
- Æthelred I of Northumbria, King of Northumbria from 774 to 779 and again from 788 or 789 until his murder in 796
- Æthelred I of East Anglia, King of East Anglia

== See also ==
- Æthelred (disambiguation)
