= Ethell =

Ethell is a surname. Notable people with this surname and occasional given name include:

- Donald Ethell (born 1937), 17th Lieutenant Governor of Alberta
- Jeffrey Ethell (1947–1997), American aviation author and pilot
- Patricia Ethell McDonald (1921–1990), Australian actress

== See also ==
- Ethel, a given name
