= Odal =

Odal (oþal, Anglo-Saxon éðel, German uodal-, adel) is a Germanic word which relates to property, heritability or nobility. It can refer to the following:

- Othala, a Germanic rune
  - after the rune, the Œ ligature
  - derived from the rune, the Odal (SS-rune), used by far-right groups
- Ethel-, Aethel-, Uodal- as an element in Germanic names, see Ethel
- Allodium:
  - Odelsrett, a traditional Scandinavian law
  - Udal law, the Shetland, Orkney and Manx derivative of the Odelsrett
- Odal, Norway, a traditional district in Norway

== See also ==
- Aetheling
- Auður (disambiguation)
