= Aethelred Eldridge =

American academic and painter (1930–2018)

Eldridge in his office at Ohio University, c.1967

Aethelred Eldridge (born James Edward Leonard Eldridge; April 21, 1930 – November 15, 2018) was an academic and avant-garde painter. He was associate professor at the Ohio University School of Art from 1957 until 2014 and is best known for his black-and-white art accompanied by esoteric writings inspired by William Blake, and the founding of a "Church of William Blake" not far from his home in Athens, Ohio. The church eventually burned down; Eldridge claimed arson.

== Biography ==
Prior to teaching, he was a college football player at the University of Michigan, an officer in the U.S. Navy.

His classes were hard to define and almost function as performance pieces. According to Ron Kroutel, professor emeritus of art at Ohio University: "the School of Art gave him his own curriculum. His style does not cleanly fit into any specific category of art." Students at Ohio University will know his 50 by 80-ft mural on a wall on Seigfred Hall.

Eldridge is listed in the Dictionary of the Avant-Gardes, which characterizes his works as "self-described 'invective pamphlets' are both cryptically pedantic, and at times autobiographical, all within his own mythopoeia. ... Similar to the texts accompanying his images, his class lectures are themselves works of art. Aethelred weaves playful, sometimes invective speech tapestries with outlandish word associations, electrically charged phonetics and scrambled catchphrases that succeed or fail with his often baffled listeners."

== Ohio University mural ==
Eldred created a large mural on the exterior of Seigfred Hall on the campus of Ohio University. He finished painting it in 1987. It was repeatedly vandalized and underwent a restoration in 2015. In 2016 the mural was vandalized again.
