= List of British supercentenarians =

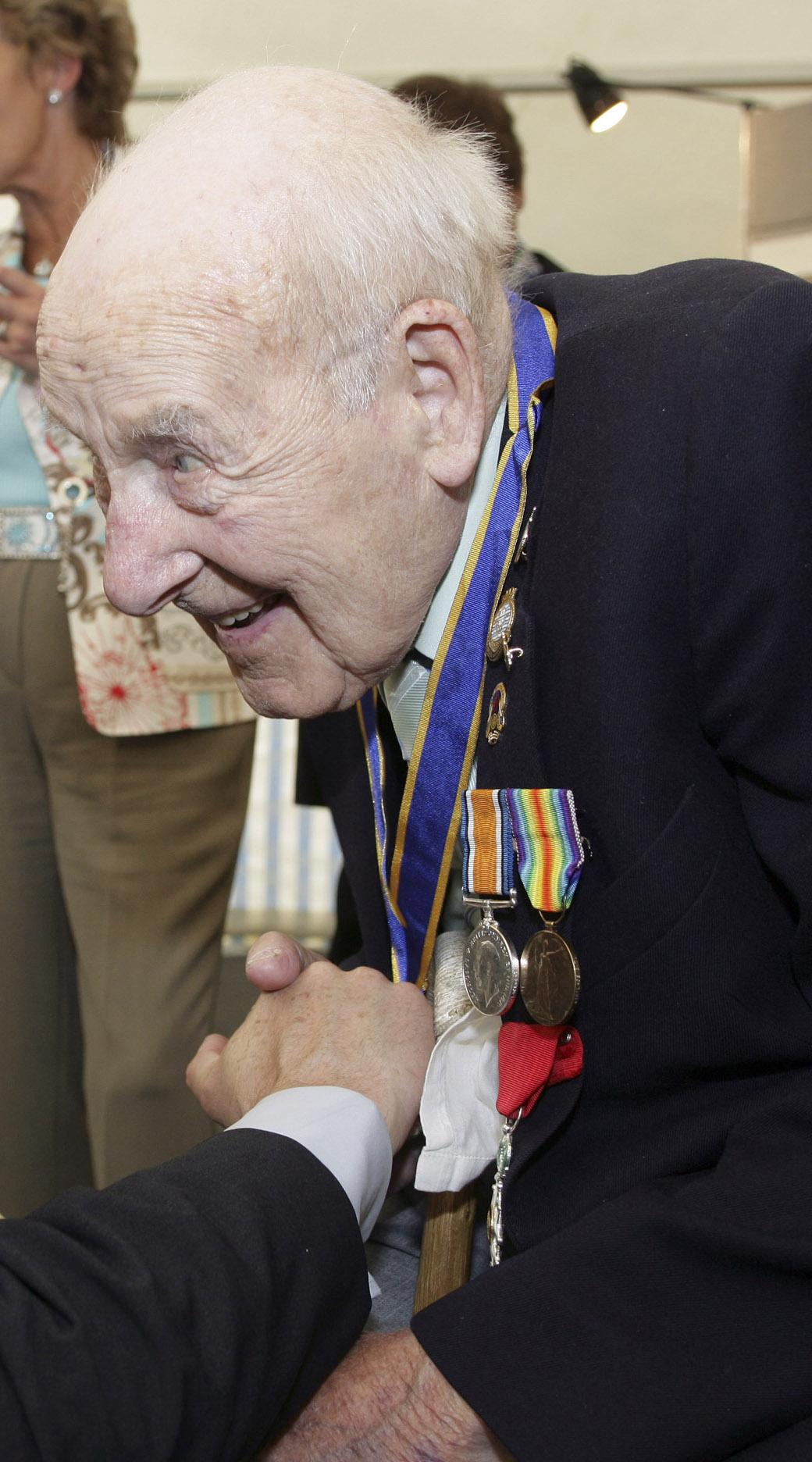
Henry Allingham (1896–2009) was a First World War veteran and is the longest-lived British man ever, at 113 years and 42 days. Pictured in 2006, aged 110.

As of January 2015, the Gerontology Research Group had validated the longevity claims of 154 British persons who have become "supercentenarians", attaining or surpassing 110 years of age. This number includes emigrants who died in other nations. The oldest known British person ever is Ethel Caterham, who is currently living at the age of 117 years, 92 days, and is additionally the oldest living person in the world. The oldest man from the United Kingdom is Henry Allingham, who died in 2009 at the age of 113 years and 42 days.

== 100 oldest British people ever ==
Deceased Living

Rank	Name	Sex	Birth date	Death date	Age	Birthplace	Place of death or residence
1	Ethel Caterham	F	21 August 1909	Living	117 years, 92 days	England	England
2	Charlotte Hughes	F	1 August 1877	17 March 1993	115 years, 228 days	England	England
3	Annie Jennings	F	12 November 1884	20 November 1999	115 years, 8 days	England	England
4	Eva Morris	F	8 November 1885	2 November 2000	114 years, 360 days	England	England
5	Ethel Lang	F	27 May 1900	15 January 2015	114 years, 233 days	England	England
6	Anna Eliza Williams	F	2 June 1873	27 December 1987	114 years, 208 days	England	Wales
7	Grace Clawson	F	15 November 1887	28 May 2002	114 years, 194 days	England	United States
8	Lucy Askew	F	8 September 1883	9 December 1997	114 years, 92 days	England	England
9	Phyllis Ridgway	F	10 March 1907	4 June 2021	114 years, 86 days	England	Canada
10	Florrie Baldwin	F	31 March 1896	8 May 2010	114 years, 38 days	England	England
11	Amy Hulmes	F	5 October 1887	27 October 2001	114 years, 22 days	England	England
12	Merah Smith	F	9 November 1912	Living	114 years, 12 days	Jamaica (Note: Jamaica was then a British colony.)	England
13	Miriam Carpelan	F	8 July 1882	22 June 1996	113 years, 350 days	England	United States
14	Grace Adelaide Jones	F	7 December 1899	14 November 2013	113 years, 342 days	England	England
15	Olive Boar	F	29 September 1904	28 August 2018	113 years, 333 days	England	England
16	Bessie Camm	F	20 June 1904	11 May 2018	113 years, 325 days	England	England
17	Rosa Comfort	F	21 January 1879	6 November 1992	113 years, 290 days	England	England
18	Lucy d'Abreu	F	24 May 1892	7 December 2005	113 years, 197 days	British Raj (Note: d'Abreu was born in Dharwar, which was then part of the British Raj. It is now in India.)	Scotland
19	Gladys Hooper	F	18 January 1903	9 July 2016	113 years, 173 days	England	England
20	Daisy Adams	F	30 June 1880	8 December 1993	113 years, 161 days	England	England
21	Florence Finch	F	22 December 1893	10 April 2007	113 years, 109 days	England	New Zealand
22	Betsy Baker	F	20 August 1842	24 October 1955	113 years, 65 days	England	United States
23	Rose Eaton	F	23 August 1909	7 October 2022	113 years, 45 days	England	England
24	Henry Allingham	M	6 June 1896	18 July 2009	113 years, 42 days	England	England
25	Annie Scott	F	15 March 1883	21 April 1996	113 years, 37 days	Ireland (Note: Government of Ireland Act 1920: The whole of the island of Ireland was part of the United Kingdom before 1921.)	Scotland
26	Ruby Gilliam	F	21 September 1885	22 October 1998	113 years, 31 days	England	England
27	Mary Florence Walker	F	28 August 1911	12 September 2024	113 years, 15 days	England	England
28	Alice Sjöquist	F	25 October 1878	7 November 1991	113 years, 13 days	England	Canada
29	Fanny Martland	F	19 November 1888	1 December 2001	113 years, 12 days	England	Canada
30	Mollie Walker	F	5 February 1909	22 January 2022	112 years, 351 days	Wales	England
31	Rachel Wieselberg	F	23 June 1883	6 June 1996	112 years, 349 days	Russian Empire (Note: Wieselberg was born in Riga, which was then part of the Russian Empire. It is now the capital of Latvia.)	England
32	Rebecca Hewison	F	19 October 1881	22 September 1994	112 years, 338 days	England	England
33	Edna Strickland	F	6 March 1911	16 January 2024	112 years, 316 days	England	England
34	John Evans	M	19 August 1877	10 June 1990	112 years, 295 days	Wales	Wales
35	Mary Keir	F	3 March 1912	17 December 2024	112 years, 289 days	Wales	Wales
36	Hilda Luck	F	19 February 1914	Living	112 years, 275 days	England	England
37	Grace Catherine Jones	F	16 September 1906	7 June 2019	112 years, 264 days	England	England
38	Marjorie Hodnett	F	1 April 1914	Living	112 years, 234 days	England	England
39	Henrietta Irwin	F	27 May 1906	15 January 2019	112 years, 233 days	Ireland	Canada
40	Alice Ducat	F	8 May 1905	22 December 2017	112 years, 228 days	Scotland	England
41	Lilian Priest	F	7 November 1908	6 June 2021	112 years, 211 days	Wales	England
42	Margaret Cryer	F	25 November 1913	23 June 2026	112 years, 210 days	England	England
43	Joan Hocquard	F	29 March 1908	24 October 2020	112 years, 209 days	England	England
44	Margaret Vivian	F	25 February 1906	20 September 2018	112 years, 207 days	Scotland	Australia
45	Amelia England	F	15 May 1900	30 November 2012	112 years, 199 days	England	United States
46	Jane Gray	F	1 December 1901	7 June 2014	112 years, 188 days	Scotland	Australia
47	Nellie Bradley	F	12 September 1889	11 March 2002	112 years, 180 days	England	England
47	Violet Wood	F	2 September 1899	29 February 2012	112 years, 180 days	England	England
49	Gertrude Kingston	F	1 February 1909	28 July 2021	112 years, 177 days	England	England
50	Esther Dalton	F	5 June 1914	Living	112 years, 169 days	England	England
51	Mary Roberts	F	5 October 1906	11 March 2019	112 years, 157 days	Wales	Canada
52	Gladys Hawley	F	18 December 1891	28 April 2004	112 years, 132 days	England	England
53	Annie Butler	F	4 June 1897	28 September 2009	112 years, 116 days	England	England
54	Ada Thompson	F	28 November 1910	13 March 2023	112 years, 105 days	England	England
55	Leonora Cox	F	30 December 1907	6 April 2020	112 years, 98 days	England	United States
56	John Tinniswood	M	26 August 1912	25 November 2024	112 years, 91 days	England	England
57	Q. M. L.	F	31 October 1909	22 January 2022	112 years, 83 days	England	England
58	Kathleen McManners	F	6 July 1901	20 September 2013	112 years, 76 days	England	England
59	Dora Caverson	F	10 September 1914	Living	112 years, 72 days	Scotland	Australia
60	Gwen Payne	F	5 August 1907	15 October 2019	112 years, 71 days	England	England
61	Florence Pittaway	F	15 October 1902	21 December 2014	112 years, 67 days	England	England
62	Adela Harrison	F	2 January 1913	6 March 2025	112 years, 63 days	England	England
63	Bob Weighton	M	29 March 1908	28 May 2020	112 years, 60 days	England	England
64	Mary Ann Hebden	F	4 October 1893	30 November 2005	112 years, 57 days	England	England
65	Edith Ingamells	F	12 January 1894	1 March 2006	112 years, 48 days	England	England
66	Mary Ellen Swan	F	24 June 1892	10 August 2004	112 years, 47 days	England	Canada
67	Alice Stevenson	F	10 July 1861	18 August 1973	112 years, 39 days	England	England
68	Violet Davies-Evans	F	30 March 1908	5 May 2020	112 years, 36 days	England	England
69	Jeanetta Thomas	F	2 December 1869	5 January 1982	112 years, 34 days	Wales	Wales
70	Margaret Fish	F	7 March 1899	12 March 2011	112 years, 5 days	England	England
71	Annie Price	F	12 January 1886	26 December 1997	111 years, 348 days	Wales	England
72	Annie Turnbull	F	21 September 1898	3 September 2010	111 years, 347 days	Scotland	Scotland
73	Ellen Watson	F	3 January 1900	15 December 2011	111 years, 346 days	England	England
74	Ellaline Redmond	F	20 March 1901	27 February 2013	111 years, 344 days	England	England
75	Margaret Taylor	F	21 April 1875	30 March 1987	111 years, 343 days	Scotland	United States
76	Ada Roe	F	6 February 1858	11 January 1970	111 years, 339 days	England	England
77	Helen Haward	F	24 November 1884	23 October 1996	111 years, 334 days	England	England
78	Eunice Bowman	F	23 August 1898	16 July 2010	111 years, 327 days	England	England
78	Dorothy Baldwin	F	8 February 1902	1 January 2014	111 years, 327 days	England	England
80	R. H.	F	16 February 1909	6 January 2021	111 years, 325 days	England	England
81	Mary Fewster	F	6 February 1878	26 December 1989	111 years, 323 days	England	England
82	Jennie Howell	F	11 February 1845	16 December 1956	111 years, 309 days	England	United States
83	Arthur Nash	M	7 January 1885	4 November 1996	111 years, 302 days	England	Canada
83	Nellie Brown	F	2 August 1913	31 May 2025	111 years, 302 days	Jamaica (Note: Jamaica was then a British colony.)	England
85	Florence Pannell	F	26 December 1868	20 October 1980	111 years, 299 days	England	England
85	Edith Kaufmann	F	12 December 1903	7 October 2015	111 years, 299 days	Austria-Hungary (Note: Kaufmann was born in Děčín, then part of Austria-Hungary, now in the Czech Republic.)	England
87	Matilde Coulter	F	30 March 1909	19 January 2021	111 years, 295 days	Italy	England
87	Zenda Wilcoxon	F	8 August 1914	30 May 2026	111 years, 295 days	England	England
89	Rose Hart	F	20 March 1878	5 January 1990	111 years, 291 days	England	England
90	Ivy Frampton	F	22 November 1903	5 September 2015	111 years, 287 days	England	England
91	Elsie Steele	F	6 January 1899	18 October 2010	111 years, 285 days	England	England
92	Hilda Clulow	F	15 March 1908	24 December 2019	111 years, 284 days	England	England
93	John Mosley Turner	M	15 June 1856	21 March 1968	111 years, 280 days	England	England
94	Lizzie Beevers	F	7 November 1884	4 August 1996	111 years, 271 days	England	England
95	Dorothy Peel	F	28 September 1902	24 June 2014	111 years, 269 days	England	England
96	Anna Tocher	F	24 November 1873	1 August 1985	111 years, 250 days	Scotland	United States
97	Avice Clarke	F	17 May 1900	17 January 2012	111 years, 245 days	England	United States
97	Irene Pearce	F	5 January 1901	6 September 2012	111 years, 245 days	England	England
99	Daisy Bastin	F	3 May 1908	2 January 2020	111 years, 244 days	England	England
100	Kate Begbie	F	9 January 1877	5 September 1988	111 years, 240 days	England	Scotland

== Biographies ==
=== Betsy Baker ===
Betsy Ann Baker (née Russell; born 20 August 1842 – 24 October 1955) was born in Great Brington, Northamptonshire in England, immigrated to the United States, settled in Nebraska, and became the world's oldest person. She lived for 65 years in Johnson County, where she was called "the Queen mother of the Johnson County Fair" in 1953. At age 107, she received a congratulatory letter from president Harry S. Truman. On her 112th birthday, she was featured in the US Army magazine Stars and Stripes. She died in Tecumseh, aged 113 years and 65 days.

Baker was the first supercentenarian listed by Guinness World Records as the world's oldest person. In 2002, researchers confirmed that she had been the world's oldest living person by modern verification standards. Baker would hold the title of world's oldest living person from Nancy Merriman's death on 14 January 1954 until her own death in 1955. She was the second well-documented person in the world to have reached the age of 113, after Delina Filkins.

=== Lucy Jane Askew ===
Lucy Jane Askew (8 September 1883 – 9 December 1997) was the oldest person in Europe at the time of her death, aged 114 years and 92 days. She was born in Loughton, Essex, to Arthur George Askew and Susan Elizabeth Askew née Ellis. Her parents were prosperous cartage contractors, cab proprietors, and landowners. She had five siblings, of whom three also lived past 100. Askew lived all her life in Loughton, and never married. She was a devout Christian, attending the Loughton Union Church. She moved into a nursing home at 106 and survived a knee operation at 108. She remained in good health and died peacefully in her sleep. She attributed her longevity to a modest lifestyle.

=== Rita Farmer ===
Rita Farmer (24 June 1914 – 30 November 2025) was the oldest person in Norfolk at the time of her death, aged 111 years and 159 days. She was born in Tonbridge, Kent, and resided in Gorleston-on-Sea. She never married, or had children.
