= Edeltraud =

Trude
- Gender: Female
- Name day: 23 June

Origin
- Origin: Germanic
- Meaning: noble strength
- Region of origin: Germany and German-speaking countries

Other names
- Related names: Edeltraut, Adeltraud, Adeltrud, Traudl, Trude, Audrey

Edeltraud is a Germanic feminine given name derived from two Old High German elements: "aþalaz" ("adal") meaning "noble", and "þrūþiz" ("trud") meaning "strength". Edeltraud is most commonly found in German-speaking countries.

== Notable people named Edeltraud ==
- Edeltraud Brexner (1927–2021), Austrian ballet dancer
- Edeltraud Günther (born 1965), German economist
- Edeltraud Hanappi-Egger (born 1964), Austrian academic
- Edeltraud Koch (born 1954), German swimmer
- Edeltraud Roller (1957–2020), German political scientist
- Edeltraud Schramm (1923–2002), Austrian gymnast
- Edeltraud Schubert (1917–2013), German actress
