= Audrey Sutherland =

American adventurer and author (1921–2015)

Audrey Sutherland (February 11, 1921 – February 23, 2015) was an American solo adventure traveler, kayaker, teacher, and author. She was best known for her solo adventure boating and swimming feats which she documented in her books titled Paddling My Own Canoe, Paddling Hawaii and Paddling North. She has been described as a "pioneer" among women doing solo adventure travel.

One of her better known books was Paddling North, which documented her 850-mile solo kayak journey in Alaska at age 60.

== Early life and career ==
Sutherland was born Audrey Helen Schufeldt in Canoga Park, California, in 1921. As a child, she spent her summers in a cabin built by her father in the San Bernardino Mountains. There, she would explore the surrounding woods, ride horses, and learn about the local flora and fauna. In her book, Paddling My Own Canoe, Sutherland described her childhood summers at the cabin: “I stalked deer at dusk and fireflies at night, ran wet and exultant in cloudbursts and thunderstorms, and climbed to the tops of young pine trees to swing them in whipping circles."

When she was sixteen, Sutherland began classes at the University of California, Los Angeles and graduated with an international relations degree. Along with her sisters, Sutherland worked as a riveter building airplanes during World War II. In 1942, she married John Lauren Sutherland, a United States Coast Guard officer and commercial fisherman, with whom she had four children. The couple moved to Hawaii from California in 1952 and later divorced. In Hawaii, Sutherland was a substitute elementary school teacher, swimming instructor, school counselor, and United States Army employee. She became an avid sea kayaker and a veteran of paddling Molokai's north coast. One of Audrey's sons is the surfer Jock Sutherland.

== Adventuring and travel writing ==
Sutherland was a resourceful traveler. Before purchasing her inflatable kayak — which Sutherland used as her exclusive mode of transportation for future trips — she explored the 20-mile stretch along the northern coast of Molokai by solo swimming. Sutherland used rope to tow her gear and sustenance behind her, including wine stored in 35-millimeter film cans and food in a Styrofoam box. She purchased her kayak so she could pack more gear and take longer trips. To avoid attention, Audrey often disguised herself as a man.

In 1980, Sutherland paddled alone 850 miles from Ketchikan to Skagway in Alaska in an inflatable kayak. Sutherland had quit her job to make the trip, after her request for temporary leave was denied. In her book, Paddling North, Sutherland wrote about her decision: "I walked into the bathroom and looked at the familiar person in the mirror...'Getting older, aren’t you lady? Better do the physical things now. You can work at a desk later.'"

Sutherland was also a continuing education teacher at the University of Hawaii. The final exam for her course on adventuring was to spend the night on one of Hawaii's outer islands, according to her former student Rusty Lillico. Inspired by the experience, Lillico helped launch the Hui Wa’a Kaukahi Kayak Club of Hawaii, now Hawaii's oldest and largest recreational kayak club. Sutherland met regularly with members of the club to share her experiences and teach kayaking skills.

Sutherland created a list for her children called, "What Every Kid Should Be Able to Do by Age Sixteen," which includes "swim 400 yards easily;" "change a diaper, and a tire;" and "be happy and comfortable alone for ten days, ten miles from the nearest other person."

When asked in an interview why she preferred to travel solo, Sutherland replied: "It’s so much simpler alone, you don’t have to worry about whether somebody is hungry, or tired, or angry, or whatever. You just go alone, it’s so much simpler that way. When you’re by yourself you can stop and look at something; learn a flower, watch an animal or a bird, or whatever it is."

== Death ==
Sutherland continued to live in her sea-front home near Haleiwa, where she had lived since 1954, through her early 90s. She died shortly after her 94th birthday due to dementia-related symptoms.

== Publications ==
Sutherland's first book, Paddling My Own Canoe, was published in 1978 by the University of Hawaii Press. It describes several of Sutherland's solo adventure experiences, including swimming, paddling, and hiking and camping on the north shore of Molokai. The title of the book was inspired by Louisa May Alcott's journal, in which she wrote: "I’d rather be a free spinster and paddle my own canoe."

Her second book, Paddling Hawaii, was published in 1988 and is an instructional text on how to island paddle and forage food. Sutherland's third and final book, Paddling North, was published by Patagonia Books in 2012 and describes her paddling trips to islands in Southeast Alaska, including encounters with wildlife such as whales, wolves, and bears. It is based on her personal journals from adventures in Alaska, most of which were made alone.
