= Waltraut Cooper =

Austrian artist

- Born: 21 December 1937 (age 88); Linz, Austria
- Known for: Light sculpture
- Movement: Art and Science Concept Art Digital Art Light Art

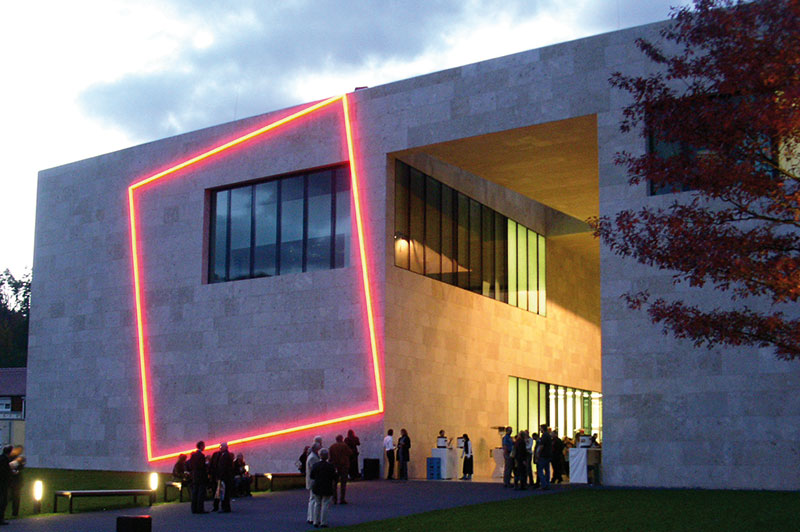
„Light Square“ at the Museum Ritter in Waldenbuch near Stuttgart from Waltraut Cooper's work series „Rainbow“. Commissioned for the exhibition „Movement in the Square“ 2006. Photograph: Dietmar Guderian

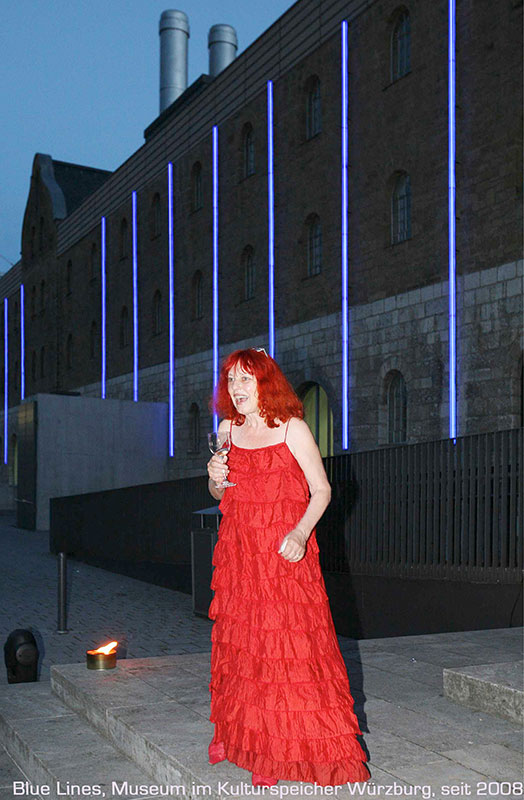
„Blue Lines“ at the Museum im Kulturspeicher Würzburg, a computer regulated light installation from Waltraut Cooper's work series „Digital Poetry“. Commissioned for the exhibition „Calculated…. Mathematics and Concrete Art“ 2008. Photograph: Dietmar Guderian

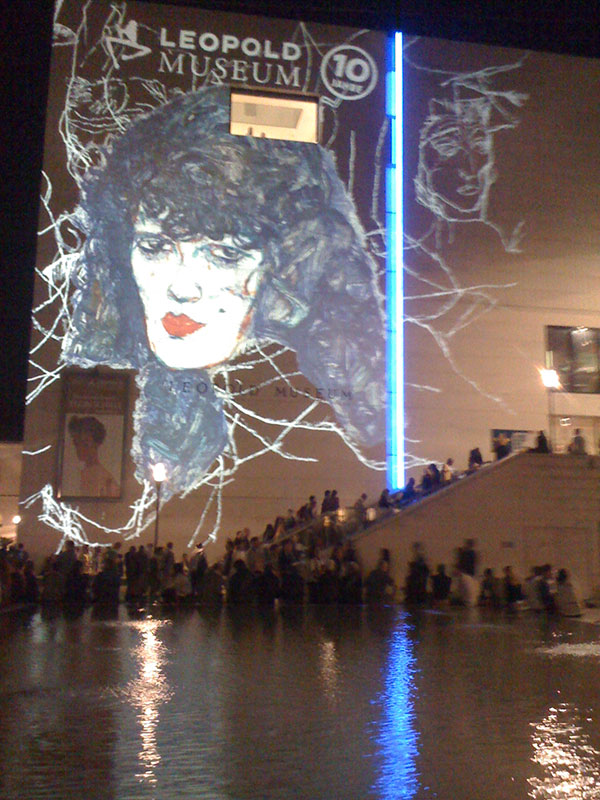
„Eclair Léopold“ at the Leopold Museum Vienna, a computer regulated light installation by Waltraut Cooper. Commissioned for the 10th anniversary of the museum 2011. Photograph: Cooper

Waltraut Cooper (born 1937, Linz, Austria), is an Austrian artist, generally described as Light Artist, primarily concerned with Art and Science, Concept Art, Digital Art.

Waltraut Cooper studied mathematics and theoretical physics at the University of Vienna and the Paris-Sorbonne. After teaching at the University of California, Santa Barbara, she began a career as an artist and studied painting and graphic arts in Lisbon and Frankfurt am Main, followed by teaching at the University of Arts in Linz. She speaks German, Latin, English, French, Italian, Spanish, Portuguese, Polish and Russian.

Works on the theme of art and science as well as large-scale light installations were presented at the Venice Biennale 1986 / Art and Science, at the Venice Bienniale 1995, at a project of the City of Venice for the 2009 Biennale, Time Space Existence / Venice Architecture Biennale 2014 and Time Space Existence / Venice Architecture Biennale 2016. Further works were created in Vienna, Berlin, Rome, Paris, Montreal, Boston, Washington, New York and Peking.

Waltraut Cooper is regarded as a pioneer of digital art, and her Klangmikado (based on the game of “pickup sticks”), a commissioned work of Ars Electronica in 1984, as a classic of digital art. She has worked regularly with her husband, the mathematician James Bell Cooper, and her daughter Angela Cooper.

Her work, which focuses on media, light and architecture, has received numerous prizes [4]. She is a member of the International Women's Forum, member of the board of trustees of the Austrian Society for Cultural Policy, member of the International Kepes Society, Hungary, and corresponding member of the Académie Européenne des Sciences, des Arts et des Lettres, Paris. On May 18, 2010, the Ministry of Culture awarded her the honorary title of professor.

Cooper began her series of space installations in the mid 70's and progressed from traditional techniques to concentrate on light as the central medium for the development of her creativity. She now illuminates façades and whole buildings with computer controlled light and sound installations, which create an intensive connection to the public space. "Scarcely any artist has explored the tension between poetry and computer, between light and color as much as she has".

For her large project RAINBOW TRILOGY 1999–2015, a series of historically significant buildings in selected metropolises were flooded by colored light. This project had three components:

- RAINBOW ACROSS AUSTRIA 1999 at the end of a century darkened by two World War
- RAINBOW FOR EUROPE 2004 on the occasion of the entry of ten new member states to the EU as the end of the wars in Europe
- WORLDWIDE RAINBOW 2015, 70 years after the end of the World Wars as a gesture of hope for world peace, the greatest challenge of today.

Together, they stretched a rainbow across Austria, Europe, and finally, in 2015, over the whole planet, highlighting an iconic building on each continent. The project "Rainbow Trilogy" was presented at the Venice Architecture Biennale 2014.

She currently resides in Vienna, Austria.

== See also ==
- Light sculpture
- Light art
- Lumino kinetic art

== Exhibitions (selection) ==
- 1986 Venice Biennale / Art and Science, light installation
- 1987 Wilhelm-Hack-Museum, Ludwigshafen, Mathematics in the Art of the Last 30 Years
- 1987 Amsterdam: Stedelijk Museum: The Art Machine
- 1988 Montreal: Images du Futur
- 1988 Linz: Ars Electronica
- 1988 Toulouse: F.A.U.S.T.
- 1989 Boston: SIGGRAPH
- 1991 New York Bronx Museum: Third Emerging Expressions Biennale
- 1995 Arte Laguna / Venice Biennale
- 1996 Bonn Kunst- und Ausstellungshalle of the Federal Republic of Germany: Art from Austria 1896–1996
- 1999 Paris Medienfestival: Pour une ecologie des media
- 1999 Rainbow across Salzburg
- 1999 Rainbow across Austria
- 2001 Rome Galleria d´Arte Moderna: Diario
- 2002 Kopenhagen, Lux Europae
- 2004 Warsaw, Berlin, Rome, Vienna, Brussels, Moscow: Rainbow for Europe
- 2005 Karlsruhe, ZKM, Museum of Contemporary Art: Waterfall
- 2006 Waldenbruch: Museum Ritter: Lichtquadrat
- 2007 Würzburg, Museum im Kulturspeicher: Blue Lines
- 2007 Vienna, Austrian Parliament: Donaustrom
- 2008 Austrian Ministry of Foreign Affairs: EUR0 08
- 2008 Peking: Olympic Fine Arts
- 2009 Venedig, Isola Sant´Erasmo: The Light of Sant’ Erasmo.
- 2010 Istanbul: Europäische Kulturhauptstadt: Light Fleet
- 2011 Wien: Leopold Museum: Eclairs Léopold
- 2012 Budapest: Vasarely Museum: Chance as Strategy
- 2012 Wels: Museum Angerlehner, Museum Bridge
- 2014 Time Space Existence / Venice Architecture Biennale
- 2014 Washington: Strathmore Fine Arts: WHAT’S UP: New Technologies in Art
- 2015 Vienna, Cairo, Beijing, Sydney, New York, Curitiba: Worldwide Rainbow
- 2015 Vienna Rainbow: Hofburg, Kunsthistorisches Museum, Natural History Museum
- 2016 Time Space Existence / Venice Architecture Biennale

== Awards (selection) ==
- 2010 Conferment of the title professor by the Culture Ministry
- 2008 Nomination for the German Bridge Building Award for the pedestrian bridge over the Inn River,
- 1991 Award of the Great Golden Medal (Künstlerhaus Wien)
- 1990 Recognition, Prix Ars Electronica
- 1988 The Art Prize of the City of Linz
- 1985 State Scholarship for Fine Arts
- 1976 Theodor Körner Prize
- 1975 Landeskulturpreis for Upper Austria
