= Audrey Hannah =

German-Canadian presenter, singer-songwriter, dancer

- Born: Miriam Audrey Hannah; 4 May 1982 (age 44); Saarbrücken, Germany
- Genre: Pop
- Occupations: Presenter, singer-songwriter, dancer
- Instruments: Vocals
- Years active: 1996–present
- Labels: Edel Records (1999–01); EMI / Capitol (2002–03)

Miriam Audrey Hannah (born May 4, 1982), better known as Audrey Hannah, is a German-Canadian presenter, singer-songwriter, and ballet dancer. She is known for the Christmas song "It's December (And I'll Be Missing You)".

== Early life ==
Miriam Hannah was born in Saarbrücken, Germany, to a Canadian mother and a German father. Her father played trumpet in an orchestra. As a child, she learned music and began singing and dancing lessons. At age 14, she graduated as ballet dancer.

== Career ==
In 1996, Hannah signed with a manager and became presenter of Das Ding, a children's program on SR 1 station. In 1998, she presented the Live Attack also in SR 1. The following year, Hannah signed with Edel Records. On November 26, she released her debut single "It's December (And I'll Be Missing You)", a Christmas song that peaked at number 27 on the German charts. On May 15, 2000, she released another single, "Waiting For... (Serenade Of Love)", which did not chart. Hannah signed to EMI and Capitol Records in 2002, and she announced a forthcoming debut album. On November 11, she released the first single from the album. The single, "Liquid Touch", peaked at number 67. However, the album was never released. In 2003, Hannah departed from EMI and Capitol Records and announced she was taking a hiatus.

In 2004, she joined the dance school Euschen-Gebhardt in Saarbrücken, and became an instructor there. In 2011, she returned to her artistic career as a presenter of the Big FM radio program Miri's Promi-Ecke.

Since July 29, 2017, she has moderated the drawing of the German lottery numbers, alternating with Chris Fleischhauer.

== Musical influences ==
Hannah cited Kylie Minogue, Britney Spears, Holly Valance, Rachel Stevens, and Madonna as her biggest musical influences.

== Radio work ==
Year	Title	Role	Station
1996–97	Das Ding	Presenter	SR 1
1998–99	Live Attack	Presenter	SR 1
2011–present	Miri's Promi-Ecke	Presenter	Big FM
2012–present	Liedergut - Music Made in Germany	Presenter	RPR1

== Discography ==
=== Singles ===
List of singles, with selected chart positions
Title	Year	Peak chart positions		Album
Title	Year	GER	GER Dance	Album
"It's December (And I'll Be Missing You)"	1999	27	93	—N/a
"Waiting For... (Serenade Of Love)"	2000	—	—	—N/a
"Liquid Touch"	2002	76	—	—N/a
"—" denotes releases that did not chart or were not released in that territory.

=== Music videos ===
List of music videos, showing director
Title	Year	Director
"It's December (And I'll Be Missing You)"	1999	—N/a
"Liquid Touch"	2002	—N/a
