= Æthelred II (disambiguation) =

Æthelred II, known as Æthelred the Unready (c. 968 – 1016), was King of the English from 978 to 1013 and again from 1014 to 1016.

Æthelred II or Ethelred II may also refer to:

- Æthelred II of East Anglia, king 870s
- Æthelred II of Northumbria, king 840s/850s
