= Ethel L. M. Thorpe =

Canadian nurse

Ethel Lily May Thorpe OBE (1908 – December 4, 2001) was a British-Canadian nurse.

== Early life and education ==
Thorpe was born and raised in Norwich, England. During World War II, she served as a nursing sister for the British army.

== Career ==
After the war, Thorpe was appointed Matron of the County Hospital at Shanghai, China. She later traveled to Jamaica where she established a training program for psychiatric nurses. By 1950, she was appointed Matron of Bellevue Hospital, Jamaica. Thorpe also sat on the General Nursing Council of Jamaica. In honour of her contributions, she was the recipient of the 1956 Order of the British Empire.

In 1962, Thorpe was sent further into Jamaica by the Colonel Office to help them gain independence. In 1963, Thorpe immigrated to Canada to take a position as Nursing Consultant for the Sanatorium Board of Manitoba. She also served as co-ordinator for five hospitals.

In 1974, she was honoured by the Canadian Tuberculosis and Respiratory Disease Association as a lifetime member. A few years later, she was the recipient of the 1977 Queen Elizabeth II Silver Jubilee Medal and was awarded the 1981 Florence Nightingale Medal by the International Committee of the Red Cross Society.

Thorpe died on December 4, 2001.
