= Audra Thomas =

Northern Irish television presenter

- Born: Audra Cunningham
- Presenting career
- Station: UTV
- Country: Northern Ireland
- Previous show: UTV Live

Audra Thomas (née Cunningham) is a Northern Irish television presenter. She is a continuity announcer and newsreader on UTV.

== Career ==
Thomas appeared on UTV as a continuity announcer and newsreader between 1998 and 2007, mainly covering weekday and weekend shifts. She returned to work for the UTV presentation department in 2008.

Thomas presented two documentaries with UTV mascots Barney and Busker in the early 2000s. She was also a regular weather presenter on UTV Live.
