= Ethel Evans =

American painter

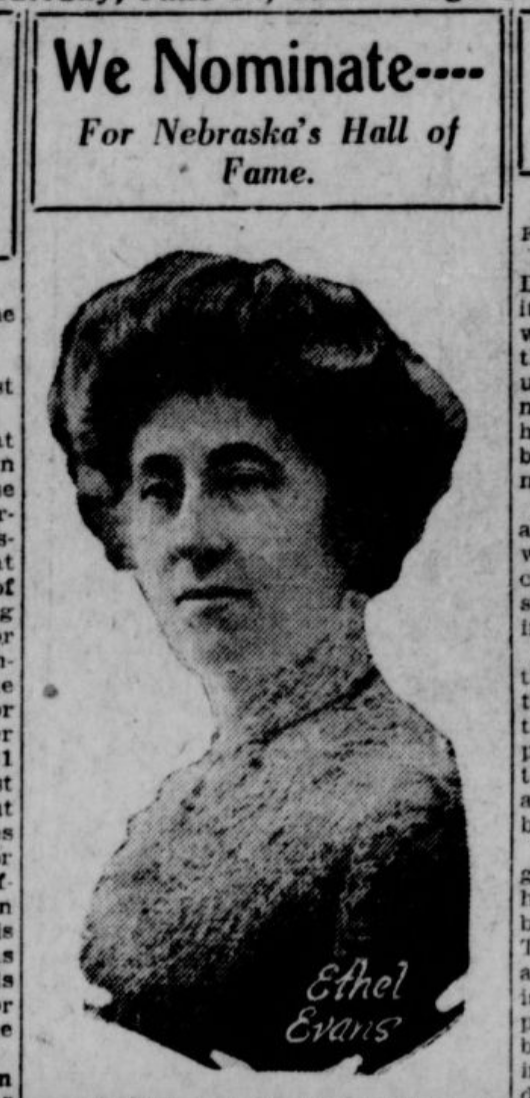
Portrait published with the Omaha Bee's nomination of her for Nebraska's Hall of Fame in 1923.

Ethel Wisner Evans (1866–April 22, 1929) was an American impressionist painter who, in the nineteenth century, supervised art instruction for the Omaha Public Schools, wrote art criticism for the Omaha Bee, and exhibited in Paris.

== Personal life ==
Evans was born in Mount Pleasant, Iowa, to banker William D. Evans. She grew up in Malvern, Iowa, to whose public library her sister Edith 1930 donated her painting Florida Pines. She stayed in the Midwest until travelling to Paris in 1895, where she both studied and exhibited art. In 1910, she had a near-death experience when a gas explosion occurred underneath the New York streetcar she was riding in, and she lost an eye. From 1917 to 1928, she travelled to locations including Cuba, Florida, and Puerto Rico. She died in 1929 in New York City and was buried in Malvern, leaving an estate of over $5000. Attending the funeral was Fannie Green, Evans's life-long friend, with whom she lived in New York City, and who donated Evans's painting La Lecon to the Joslyn Art Museum in Omaha in 1935.

== Career ==
Evans graduated from Western College, Oxford, Ohio, and later attended the Art Students League of New York and the Philadelphia School of Design for Women, later named Moore College of Art. In 1891, Evans exhibited with one of Omaha's earliest art organizations, the Western Art Association. She also exhibited for the Art Club in Lincoln, Nebraska, at the same time, and later was Treasurer of Omaha's Art Workers Society. From 1892 to 1895, Ethel was the Omaha Public Schools Supervisor of Drawing, and in 1898-1903, became their Teacher of Mechanical Drawing. She also taught drawing at Bryant High School in New York City. She wrote for the Omaha Daily Bee multiple reviews of the art at the Trans-Mississippi International Exposition, and designed the 1895 May Day column logo for the Bee, which had been turned over to women editors for the holiday.

Evans was in Paris for instruction from 1895 to 1898, where she lived at 11 rue Bara. She studied at the Merson Academy, and her teachers included Charles Guerin, Raphael Collin and Augustus Koopman. While in Paris, she exhibited a portrait of Miss Kirchner of Detroit at the Paris Salon of 1897. She returned to Paris in 1911 and exhibited in the February 1914 American Woman's Art Association show at rue de Chevreuse, before leaving due to World War I. In 1920, she returned to Europe. Her memberships included the National Association of Women Painters and Sculptors and the Pen and Brush Club of New York.
