= Audra, West Virginia =

Unincorporated community in West Virginia, United States

Audra
- Unincorporated community
- Location within the state of West Virginia Audra (the United States)
- Coordinates: 39°2′31″N 80°4′0″W
- Country: United States
- State: West Virginia
- County: Barbour
- Elevation: 1,742 ft (531 m)
- Time zone: UTC-5 (Eastern (EST))
  - Summer (DST): UTC-4 (EDT)
- GNIS feature ID: 1535079

Audra is an unincorporated community in Barbour County, West Virginia, United States.

Audra State Park is located at Audra on the Middle Fork River.

== Notable person ==
- William Smith O'Brien (1862–1948), U.S. Congressman, was born in Audra.

== See also ==
- Audra State Park
