= Traute Schäfer =

German volleyball player (born 1942)

Personal information
- Nationality: German
- Born: 20 September 1942 (age 82); Hanover, Germany

Sport
- Sport: Volleyball

Traute Schäfer (born 20 September 1942) is a German volleyball player. She competed in the women's tournament at the 1972 Summer Olympics.
