= Traudl =

Traudl is a given name and a diminutive form of Gertraud. Notable people with the name include:

- Traudl Ebert (born 1936), Austrian fencer
- Traudl Hächer (born 1962), retired German alpine skier
- Traudl Hecher (1943–2023), Austrian former alpine skier and Olympic medalist
- Traudl Junge (1920–2002), Adolf Hitler's youngest personal private secretary, from December 1942 to April 1945
- Traudl Kulikowsky (born 1943), German film actress
- Traudl Maurer (born 1961), German ski mountaineer and long-distance runner
- Traudl Ruckser (1925–2018), Austrian former gymnast
- Traudl Stark (1930–2021), German actress
- Traudl Treichl (born 1950), German skier
- Traudl Wallbrecher (1923–2016), German theologian
