= Audra State Park =

State park in Barbour County, West Virginia

- IUCN category III (natural monument or feature)
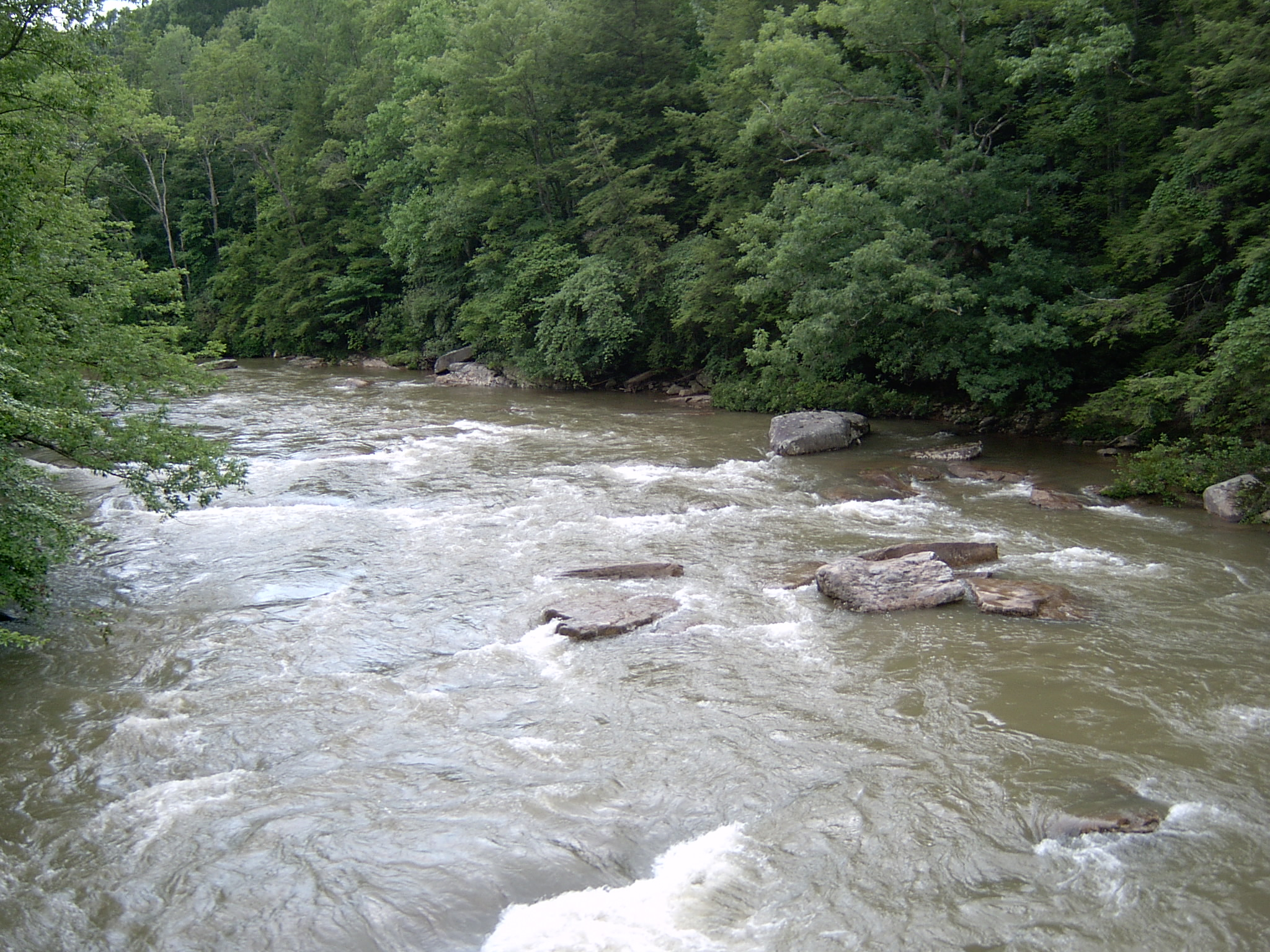
- Middle Fork River

- Location within West Virginia
- Location: Barbour & Upshur, West Virginia, United States
- Coordinates: 39°02′25″N 80°03′55″W
- Area: 355 acres (144 ha)
- Elevation: 1,811 ft (552 m)
- Established: 1950
- Named for: Audra, West Virginia
- Governing body: West Virginia Division of Natural Resources
- Website: wvstateparks.com/park/audra-state-park/

Audra State Park is a West Virginia state park located on 355 acres (1.44 km^{2}) in southwestern Barbour County. It was established around the remnants of an early 19th-century gristmill and the tiny community of Audra. A gristmill spillway is still visible in the river.

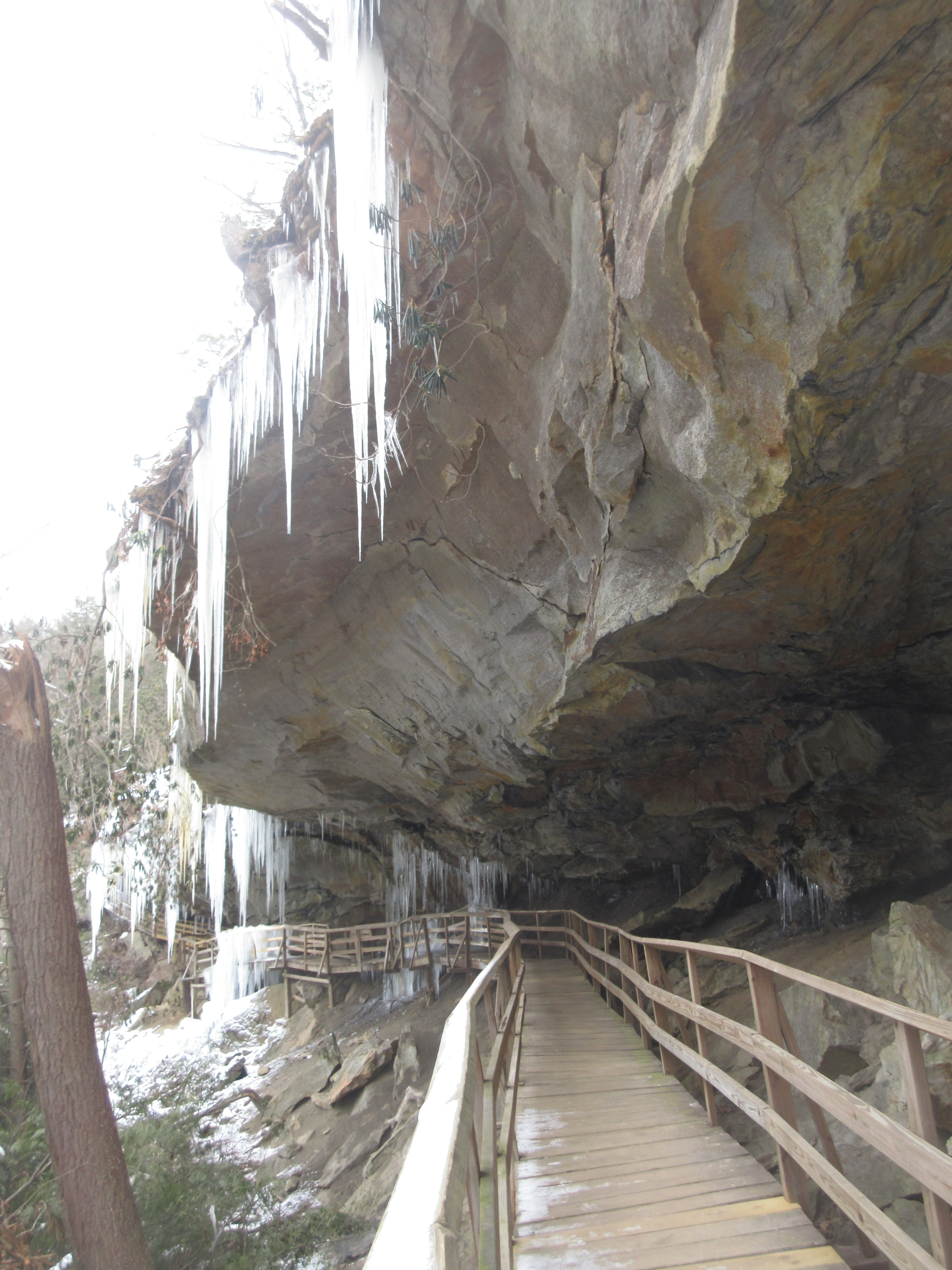
Icicles drape Alum Cave on a winter afternoon

The park is a hilly, secondary forest area bisected by the Middle Fork River. The deep pools, large, flat rocks, and riverside beach have provided generations of campers, local teens and college students a place to swim or work on their tans. Audra State Park is the site of Alum Cave, which is accessible by a boardwalk built along this overhanging sandstone ledge.

The park serves as the put-in point for a 6.6 mile kayak run along about 2.8 miles the Middle Fork River and about 3.8 miles of the Tygart Valley River to the confluence of the latter with the Buckhannon River.

== Features ==
- 67 camp sites
- Swimming in the Middle Fork River
- Hiking trails
- Kayaking in the Middle Fork River
- Picnic area

== Accessibility ==
Accessibility for the disabled was assessed by West Virginia University. The assessment found the campground, picnic area, and park offices to be accessible. The main swimming hole (just below the site of the former gristmill), with wet, slippery rocks and unpaved approaches is not considered accessible.

== See also ==
- List of West Virginia state parks
