= Ethel Caterham =

World's oldest verified living person (born 1909)

- Born: Ethel May Collins; 21 August 1909 (age 117 years, 90 days); Shipton Bellinger, Hampshire, England
- Known for: Oldest verified living person (since 30 April 2025); Oldest verified British person ever (since 7 April 2025); Last surviving subject of Edward VII; Last surviving person born in the 1900s decade
- Spouse: Norman Caterham (m. 1933; died 1976)
- Children: 2 (both deceased)

Ethel May Caterham (née Collins; born 21 August 1909) is an English supercentenarian who, at the age of 117 years, 90 days, has been the world's oldest verified living person since the death of Inah Canabarro Lucas on 30 April 2025. She is also the oldest British person in recorded history (nobody else from the United Kingdom having reached the age of 116), the last surviving validated person born in the 1900s decade, the 10th oldest validated person ever, and the last surviving subject of King Edward VII.

== Biography ==
=== Early life and family ===
Ethel May Collins was born on 21 August 1909 in Shipton Bellinger, Hampshire, England, as the second youngest of eight siblings. She spent her early years in the nearby town of Tidworth. Her sister, Gladys Babilas, reached the age of 104. In 1927, at 18 years old, Caterham travelled to British India, where she worked as an au pair for a military household until the age of 21.

In 1931, following her return to England, she met Norman Caterham at a dinner party. The couple were married at Salisbury Cathedral in 1933, where Norman had previously sung as a choirboy. He went on to serve as a lieutenant colonel in the Royal Army Pay Corps. They lived in Harnham, Salisbury, before postings in Hong Kong and Gibraltar. During their time in Hong Kong, she established a nursery school focused on English language, crafts and recreational activities. While stationed in Gibraltar, the couple had two daughters, Gem and Anne, whom they later raised in England. Norman died in 1976, and Gem died in the early 2000s.

=== Later years ===
Caterham drove until she was 97 and enjoyed playing contract bridge in her centenarian years. Both of her daughters have predeceased her, but she has three grandchildren and five great-grandchildren. She had lived in an annex within the home of her younger daughter, Anne, until Anne's death in February 2020 at the age of 82. Following this, Caterham relocated to a care facility in Ash Vale, Surrey, and later moved to another home in Lightwater.

In 2020, at the age of 110, Caterham contracted and recovered from COVID-19. Shortly before her 111th birthday, she was interviewed by BBC Radio Surrey, where she attributed her longevity to "taking everything in my stride, the highs and the lows." On her 111th birthday in August 2020, she was visited by the mayor of Surrey Heath, having been the oldest living resident of Surrey since January 2019.

On 18 September 2025, aged 116, Caterham met King Charles III, with whom she exchanged pleasantries and recalled his investiture in 1969.

== Longevity ==
On 22 January 2022, following the death of Mary "Mollie" Walker, Caterham became the oldest living person in the United Kingdom. On 7 October 2022, after the death of Rose Eaton, she became the last known surviving subject of Edward VII. She became Europe's oldest living person on 19 August 2024, upon the death of Maria Branyas of Spain. Two days later, she became the third British person verified to turn 115, the first to do so since Annie Jennings in 1999.

On 7 April 2025, Caterham surpassed the age of Charlotte Hughes to become the oldest person ever from the United Kingdom. 23 days later on 30 April, following the death of Inah Canabarro Lucas of Brazil, she became both the world's oldest living person and the last known person born in the 1900s decade.

On 21 August 2025, Caterham marked her 116th birthday, becoming the first person in British history to reach this age. She received a congratulatory message from João Marinho Neto of Brazil (born 5 October 1912), the world's oldest living man – reportedly the first documented exchange between the world's oldest verified woman and oldest verified man.

Upon her 117th birthday on 21 August 2026, she once again received a congratulatory message from Marinho Neto, as well as fellow English supercentenarian Hilda Luck, and Welshman Owen Filer, who is recognised as the current oldest known living man in Wales. Looking back over the recent past, she observed that "even at 117, I have had many firsts this year, from stroking a llama to holding hands with the king." She went on to say that her secret to long life is "never arguing with anyone; I listen, and I do what I want".

== See also ==
- List of oldest people
- List of the verified oldest people
