= Ethel Lang (supercentenarian) =

British supercentenarian (1900–2015)

- Born: Ethel Lancaster; 27 May 1900; Worsbrough, West Riding of Yorkshire, England
- Died: 15 January 2015 (aged 114 years, 233 days); Barnsley, South Yorkshire, England
- Known for: Oldest living person in the United Kingdom (14 November 2013 — 15 January 2015)
- Spouse: William Lang (m. 1922; died 1988)
- Children: 1

Ethel Lang (née Lancaster; 27 May 1900 – 15 January 2015) was a British supercentenarian who, until her death, was the oldest living person in the United Kingdom. She was the last living British person to have been born during the reign of Queen Victoria.

== Biography ==
Lang was born in Worsbrough, near Barnsley, West Riding of Yorkshire, to miner Charles Lancaster and his wife Sarah. Her mother lived to the age of 91, one of her sisters lived to be 104 and her great-grandmother died in 1848 aged 92. At the time of Lang's death, her daughter Margaret was still alive at 91 years old.

Lang left school at age 13 to work in a shirt factory. She married William Lang, the son of an alderman and councillor in 1922 and their daughter Margaret was born in 1923. William died in 1988 at age 92. She lived independently until the age of 105. Lang became the United Kingdom's oldest living person upon the death of Grace Jones on 14 November 2013.

Lang died on 15 January 2015 in Barnsley, at 114 years, 233 days old. After her death, Gladys Hooper became the United Kingdom's oldest living person.

== See also ==
- List of European supercentenarians
- List of the verified oldest people
- List of the verified oldest women
- Oldest people
