= Middle Fork River =

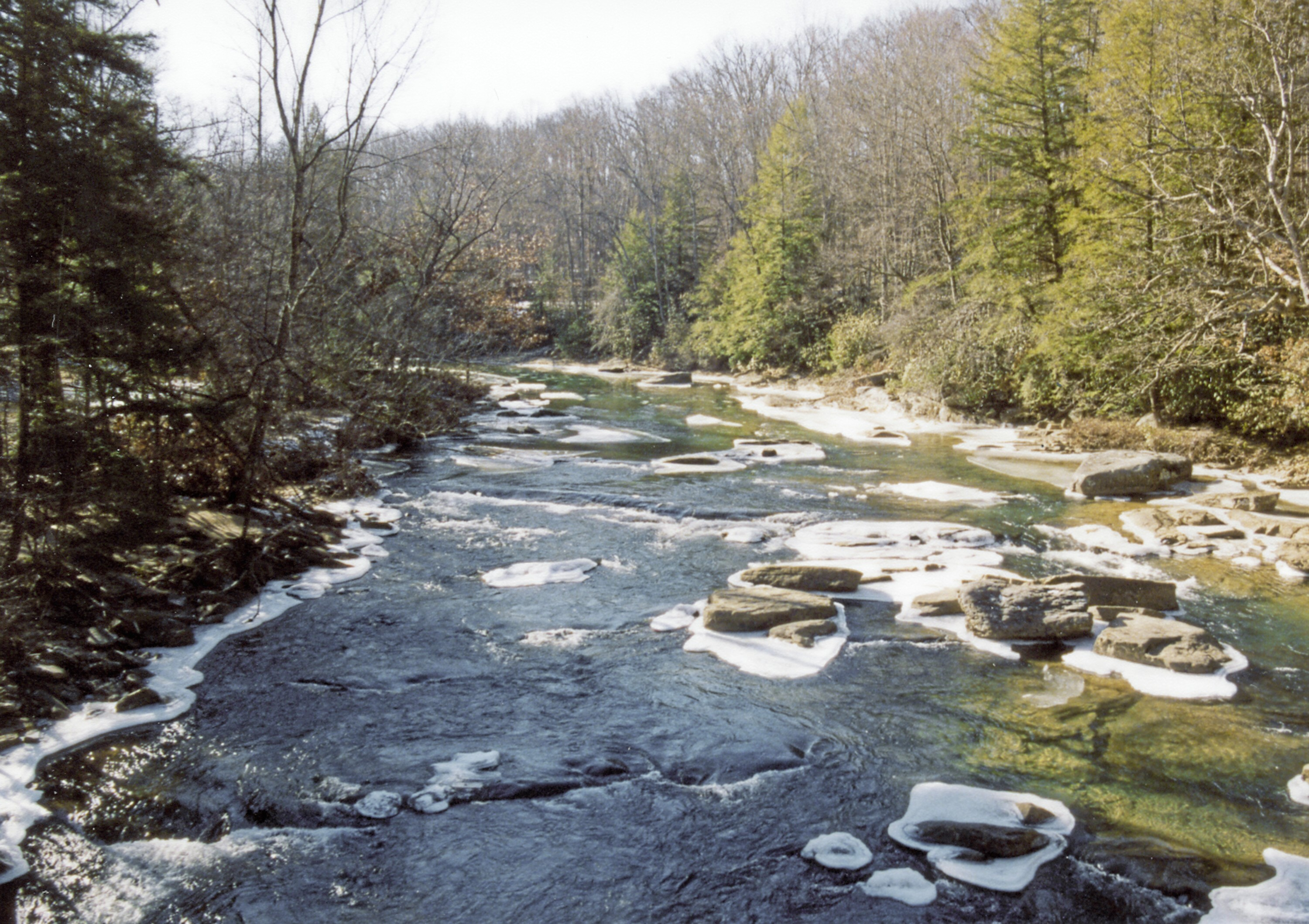
- The Middle Fork River in Audra State Park in 2005

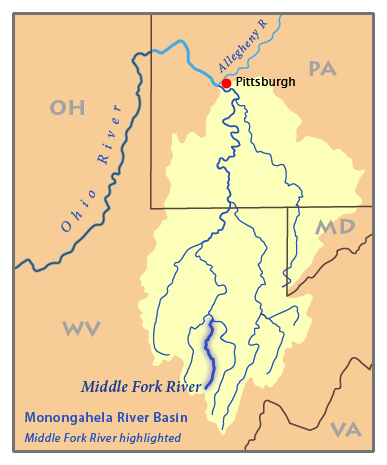
- Map of the Monongahela River basin, with the Middle Fork River highlighted

Location
- Country: United States
- State: West Virginia

Physical characteristics
- Source: Kittle Creek
  - location: Rich Mountain, Randolph County
  - coordinates: 38°40′03″N 80°04′45″W
  - elevation: 3,639 ft (1,109 m)
- 2nd source: Birch Fork
  - location: Rocky Ridge, Randolph County
  - coordinates: 38°40′47″N 80°05′58″W
  - elevation: 3,493 ft (1,065 m)
- Source confluence
  - location: Adolph, West Virginia, Randolph County
  - coordinates: 38°44′44″N 80°02′47″W
  - elevation: 2,303 ft (702 m)
- Mouth: Tygart Valley River
  - location: Barbour County
  - coordinates: 39°03′41″N 80°02′51″W
  - elevation: 1,483 ft (452 m)
- Length: 35 mi (56 km)
- Basin size: 152 mi^{2} (390 km^{2})
- Discharge
  - location: Audra State Park
  - average: 356 cu ft/s (10.1 m^{3}/s)
  - minimum: 0.2 cu ft/s (0.0057 m^{3}/s)
  - maximum: 16,700 cu ft/s (470 m^{3}/s)

The Middle Fork River is a 35.4-mile-long (57.0 km) tributary of the Tygart Valley River in north-central West Virginia, USA. Via the Tygart Valley, Monongahela and Ohio rivers, it is part of the watershed of the Mississippi River, draining an area of 152 square miles (390 km^{2}) on the easternmost part of the unglaciated portion of the Allegheny Plateau. According to the Geographic Names Information System, the Middle Fork River has also been known simply as "Middle Fork" and as "Middlefork."

== Geography ==
The Middle Fork River is formed at the community of Adolph in western Randolph County by the confluence of the headwaters tributaries Kittle Creek and Birch Fork, each approximately 6.5 miles (10.5 km) in length, which rise just north of Kumbrabow State Forest and flow northwardly. Kittle Creek rises on the western slope of Rich Mountain, considered to be part of the westernmost ridge of the Allegheny Mountains and the eastern boundary of the Allegheny Plateau.

From Adolph, the Middle Fork River flows generally northwardly, roughly in parallel to Rich Mountain. The river's course defines part of the boundary between Randolph and Upshur counties, and then between Upshur and Barbour counties, before flowing into southern Barbour County, where it joins the Tygart Valley River, approximately 5 miles (8 km) south of Philippi and a few miles upstream of the mouth of the Buckhannon River. Near its mouth it passes through Audra State Park, which was established in the mid-20th century and provides campsites and a swimming beach along the river. In Upshur County it collects a tributary known as the Right Fork Middle Fork River, which rises in southwestern Randolph County and flows northwardly into eastern Upshur County.

For most of its course, the Middle Fork forms whitewater rapids of Class I to Class IV on the International Scale of River Difficulty. From Audra State Park downstream to its mouth, it forms Class IV rapids. According to the West Virginia Department of Environmental Protection, approximately 94% of the Middle Fork River's watershed is forested, mostly deciduous, and approximately 4% is used for agriculture and pasture.

== Flow rate ==
At the United States Geological Survey's stream gauge in Audra State Park, the annual mean flow of the river between 1942 and 2005 was 356 cubic feet per second (10.1 m^{3}/s). The highest recorded flow during the period was 16,700 cu ft/s (470 m^{3}/s) on May 17, 1996. The lowest recorded flow was 0.2 cu ft/s (0.0057 m^{3}/s) on several days in October 1953.

== See also ==
- List of West Virginia rivers
