= List of living centenarians =

The following is a list of living centenarians (living people who have attained the age of at least 100 years) who are recognized for reasons other than their longevity. For more specific lists of people (living or deceased) who are known for these reasons, see lists of centenarians.

For living people who achieved recognition for their longevity, see list of oldest living people.

== List of oldest notable living people ==
Supercentenarians (above 110 years old)

Name	Sex	Birth	Age	Nationality	Reason for notability
Madeleine Dellamonica	F	July 23, 1912	114 years, 122 days	French	Egyptologist
Vera Korolyova	F	September 30, 1914	112 years, 53 days	Russian	Agricultural worker and Hero of Socialist Labour
Dorothy Burnham	F	March 22, 1915	111 years, 245 days	American	Civil rights activist, educator and widow of Louis E. Burnham
James Clayton Flowers	M	December 25, 1915	110 years, 332 days	American	Military pilot and Tuskegee Airman
Hélène Guisan-Démétriadès	F	November 16, 1916	110 years, 6 days	Swiss	Writer, poet and teacher
Whang-od	F	February 17, 1917	109 years, 278 days	Filipino	Mambabatok or tattoo artist
Mirjam Bolle-Levie	F	March 20, 1917	109 years, 247 days	Dutch-Israeli	Holocaust survivor
Yang You	M	October 17, 1917	109 years, 36 days	Chinese	Scientist
Jean Turco	M	December 19, 1917	108 years, 338 days	French	Politician
Ilmari Koppinen	M	January 8, 1918	108 years, 318 days	Finnish	Military officer
Brenda Milner	F	July 15, 1918	108 years, 130 days	British-Canadian	Neuropsychologist
Alfons Tomke	M	July 16, 1918	108 years, 129 days	Polish	Activist
Hortense McClinton	F	August 27, 1918	108 years, 87 days	American	Professor of social work
Herbert I. Stern	M	December 24, 1918	107 years, 333 days	American	Holocaust liberator, World War II battalion commander and oldest living West Point graduate
Gerd Göran	F	January 5, 1919	107 years, 321 days	Swedish	Artist
Soekartini Djojohadikoesoemo	F	March 19, 1919	107 years, 248 days	Indonesian	Lecturer of English Letters at University of Indonesia and relatives of Prabowo Subianto
Maj-Britt Håkansson	F	March 29, 1919	107 years, 238 days	Swedish	Actress
Caren Marsh Doll	F	April 6, 1919	107 years, 230 days	American	Actress and dancer
Osman Nuhu Sharubutu	M	April 23, 1919	107 years, 213 days	Ghanaian	Islamic cleric
Nancy Stratford	F	June 12, 1919	107 years, 163 days	American	Aviator
Virginia Claudon Allen	F	July 26, 1919	107 years, 119 days	American	Radio broadcaster and Red Cross volunteer
E. Gerald Meyer	M	November 2, 1919	107 years, 20 days	American	Emeritus professor of chemistry
Maria Ehrenberg	F	November 4, 1919	107 years, 18 days	German	Botanist
Klaus Obermeyer	M	December 2, 1919	106 years, 355 days	German-born American	Businessman
Simone Rozès	F	March 29, 1920	106 years, 238 days	French	Judge
Ismet Elezi	M	April 5, 1920	106 years, 231 days	Albanian	World War II veteran and academician
Kim Hyung-suk	M	April 23, 1920	106 years, 213 days	North Korean-born South Korean	Writer, philosopher and emeritus professor
Magdalena Álvarez de Seminario	F	May 10, 1920	106 years, 196 days	Argentine	Politician
Sonja de Lennart	F	May 21, 1920	106 years, 185 days	German	Fashion designer
Alice Shepard Cary	F	June 2, 1920	106 years, 173 days	American	Physician
Diana Armfield	F	June 11, 1920	106 years, 164 days	British	Artist
Thomas Franklin Vaughns	M	July 7, 1920	106 years, 138 days	American	Military pilot and Tuskegee Airman
Christian Lamb	F	July 19, 1920	106 years, 126 days	British	World War II veteran
Klaus Ruedenberg	M	August 25, 1920	106 years, 89 days	German-born American	Chemist
Li Dak-sum	M	October 9, 1920	106 years, 44 days	Hong Konger	Entrepreneur and philanthropist
Zou Yu	M	October 10, 1920	106 years, 43 days	Chinese	Politician
Ivan Mišković	M	October 24, 1920	106 years, 29 days	Croatian	Army general
Jang Bahadur Singh	M	December 10, 1920	105 years, 347 days	Indian	Folk singer and wrestler
Yavar Abbas	M	December 15, 1920	105 years, 342 days	British-Indian	Cameraman, film producer and World War II veteran
Franca Pilla	F	December 18, 1920	105 years, 339 days	Italian	First Lady of Italy; widow of president Carlo Azeglio Ciampi
Norbert Schücking	M	January 15, 1921	105 years, 311 days	Austrian-born German	World War II flying ace
Louis Witten	M	April 13, 1921	105 years, 223 days	American	Theoretical physicist
Margaret Vardell Sandresky	F	April 28, 1921	105 years, 208 days	American	Composer, organist and teacher
Beulah Garrick	F	June 12, 1921	105 years, 163 days	British	Actress
Edmund Gordon	M	June 13, 1921	105 years, 162 days	American	Psychologist and professor
Pierre Labric	M	June 30, 1921	105 years, 145 days	French	Organist, pedagogue and composer
Patricia Wright	F	July 5, 1921	105 years, 140 days	American	Actress, dancer, weather presenter, announcer and commercial spokeswoman
Ella Blumenthal	F	July 25, 1921	105 years, 120 days	Polish	Holocaust survivor
Eddy Goldfarb	M	September 5, 1921	105 years, 78 days	American	Toy inventor
Ernst Gerhardt	M	September 10, 1921	105 years, 73 days	German	Politician
Gaylen Hansen	M	September 21, 1921	105 years, 62 days	American	Artist
John F. Gonge	M	November 5, 1921	105 years, 17 days	American	Lieutenant general
Walther Weißauer	M	November 10, 1921	105 years, 12 days	German	Jurist
José de Jesús Sahagún de la Parra	M	January 1, 1922	104 years, 325 days	Mexican	Roman Catholic bishop
Ray Anthony	M	January 20, 1922	104 years, 306 days	American	Bandleader, trumpeter, songwriter and actor; last living member of the Glenn Miller Orchestra
Rhoda Wurtele	F	January 21, 1922	104 years, 305 days	Canadian	Olympic skier
Jan Ihnatík	M	March 1, 1922	104 years, 266 days	Czech	World War II veteran
Ingelene Rodewald	F	March 26, 1922	104 years, 241 days	German	Author
Alexandra Myšková	F	April 4, 1922	104 years, 232 days	Czech-born Norwegian	Actress
Milisav Lukić	M	April 23, 1922	104 years, 213 days	Serbian	Politician and World War II veteran
Deborah Szekely	F	May 3, 1922	104 years, 203 days	American	Writer, activist and philanthropist
Wu Liangyong	M	May 7, 1922	104 years, 199 days	Chinese	Architect and urban planner
Gerald Holton	M	May 23, 1922	104 years, 183 days	German-born American	Physicist, historian of science and educator
Judy Hall	F	July 2, 1922	104 years, 143 days	Australian	Pianist and musician
Manos Zacharias	M	July 9, 1922	104 years, 136 days	Greek	Film director, writer and actor
Annette Warren	F	July 11, 1922	104 years, 134 days	American	Vocalist and jazz stylist
Rachel Robinson	F	July 19, 1922	104 years, 126 days	American	Professor, nurse, widow of baseball player Jackie Robinson and founder of the Jackie Robinson Foundation
Maria Helena Andrés	F	August 2, 1922	104 years, 112 days	Brazilian	Artist
William de Rham	M	August 22, 1922	104 years, 92 days	Swiss	Olympic equestrian
Annabel Maule	F	September 8, 1922	104 years, 75 days	British	Actress
Sir Sydney Kentridge	M	November 5, 1922	104 years, 17 days	South African-born British	Lawyer and judge
María Isabel Rodríguez	F	November 5, 1922	104 years, 17 days	Salvadoran	Physician, academician and government official
Dieter Gruen	M	November 21, 1922	104 years, 1 day	German-born American	Scientist
Jacqueline White	F	November 27, 1922	103 years, 360 days	American	Actress
Albertine Baclet	F	December 1, 1922	103 years, 356 days	Guadeloupean	Politician
Tatiana Leskova	F	December 6, 1922	103 years, 351 days	French-born Brazilian	Ballerina and choreographer
Steve Wochy	M	December 25, 1922	103 years, 332 days	Canadian	Ice hockey player
Boris Kravtsov	M	December 28, 1922	103 years, 329 days	Russian	Politician and jurist
Phan Wannamethee	M	January 30, 1923	103 years, 296 days	Thai	Diplomat and sixth secretary general of ASEAN
María Victoria	F	February 26, 1923	103 years, 269 days	Mexican	Actress, singer and comedian
Pedro Geiger	M	March 1, 1923	103 years, 266 days	Brazilian	Geographer
Russell Freeburg	M	March 4, 1923	103 years, 263 days	American	Journalist
Anthony Eyton	M	May 17, 1923	103 years, 189 days	British	Artist
Mohammad Ali Movahed	M	May 24, 1923	103 years, 182 days	Iranian	Historian
Françoise Sullivan	F	June 10, 1923	103 years, 165 days	Canadian	Painter, sculptor, dancer, choreographer and photographer
Kari Polanyi Levitt	F	June 14, 1923	103 years, 161 days	Austrian-born Canadian	Economist
Mitsuye Yamada	F	July 5, 1923	103 years, 140 days	Japanese-American	Poet, essayist, feminist and human rights activist
James H. Harvey	M	July 13, 1923	103 years, 132 days	American	Air Force pilot and Tuskegee Airman
Fred Strachan	M	August 17, 1923	103 years, 97 days	New Zealander	Rowing coach
Aileen Adams	F	September 5, 1923	103 years, 78 days	British	Consultant anaesthetist
Hilma Nerep-Mossin	F	September 18, 1923	103 years, 65 days	Swedish-Estonian	Pianist and conductor
Merlin Hulse	M	September 21, 1923	103 years, 62 days	American	Politician and farmer
Du Daozheng	M	September 22, 1923	103 years, 61 days	Chinese	Journalist
Socorro Ramos	F	September 23, 1923	103 years, 60 days	Filipino	Businesswoman
Shubert Spero	M	September 23, 1923	103 years, 60 days	American	Rabbi and author
Richard M. Baughn	M	September 26, 1923	103 years, 57 days	American	Air Force brigadier general
Henry Young	M	September 26, 1923	103 years, 57 days	Australian	World War II veteran and tennis player
Surindra Nath Sharma	M	October 3, 1923	103 years, 50 days	Indian	Army general and military engineer
Robert Kuok	M	October 6, 1923	103 years, 47 days	Malaysian	Business magnate, investor and philanthropist
V. P. Appukutta Poduval	M	October 9, 1923	103 years, 44 days	Indian	Independence and social activist
Ida Vitale	F	November 2, 1923	103 years, 20 days	Uruguayan	Poet, translator, essayist, lecturer and literary critic
Guillermo Rodríguez	M	November 4, 1923	103 years, 18 days	Ecuadorian	Politician, acting president (1972–1976) and military leader
Józef Hen	M	November 8, 1923	103 years, 14 days	Polish	Novelist, essayist, playwright, screenwriter and reporter of Jewish origin
Louis Danziger	M	November 17, 1923	103 years, 5 days	American	Graphic designer and educator
Bentsion Fleishman	M	November 21, 1923	103 years, 1 day	Russian-American	Mathematical scientist
Jiří Švenger	M	November 28, 1923	102 years, 359 days	Czech	Aviation radio operator
Vincent Ball	M	December 4, 1923	102 years, 353 days	Australian	Actor
Johnny Pate	M	December 5, 1923	102 years, 352 days	American	Jazz musician
Jacqueline Fleury	F	December 12, 1923	102 years, 345 days	French	Member of the French Resistance
Grégoire Maertens	M	January 1, 1924	102 years, 325 days	Belgian	Esperantist
Walter Bingham	M	January 5, 1924	102 years, 321 days	German-born British-Israeli	Holocaust survivor, journalist, actor and businessman
Glenys Cour	F	January 6, 1924	102 years, 320 days	Welsh	Artist
Anne Vernon	F	January 9, 1924	102 years, 317 days	French	Actress
Ivan Martynushkin	M	January 18, 1924	102 years, 308 days	Russian	Holocaust liberator and World War II veteran
Richard Rohmer	M	January 24, 1924	102 years, 302 days	Canadian	Aviator, lawyer, advisor, author and historian
Wu Chengzhang	M	February 8, 1924	102 years, 287 days	Chinese	Olympic basketball player
Woody Woodbury	M	February 9, 1924	102 years, 286 days	American	Comedian, actor, television personality and talk show host
Jose Petrick	F	February 14, 1924	102 years, 281 days	British-born Australian	Historian and community advocate
Andrew Bruce, 11th Earl of Elgin	M	February 17, 1924	102 years, 278 days	British	Peer
Zheng Tuobin	M	February 24, 1924	102 years, 271 days	Chinese	Politician
I. Leo Glasser	M	April 6, 1924	102 years, 230 days	American	Judge
Seiji Fujishiro	M	April 17, 1924	102 years, 219 days	Japanese	Artist
Jiří Pavel Kafka	M	May 2, 1924	102 years, 204 days	Czech	World War II veteran
Gerald Westheimer	M	May 13, 1924	102 years, 193 days	Australian	Scientist
Sir Thomas Baird	M	May 17, 1924	102 years, 189 days	British	Admiral
Clifford DeBaptiste	M	May 19, 1924	102 years, 187 days	American	Politician and funeral director
Jacques Dixmier	M	May 24, 1924	102 years, 182 days	French	Mathematician
Marshall Allen	M	May 25, 1924	102 years, 181 days	American	Jazz saxophonist, leader of The Sun Ra Arkestra and Buffalo Soldier
Torsten Wiesel	M	June 3, 1924	102 years, 172 days	Swedish	Neurophysiologist and recipient of the 1981 Nobel Prize in Physiology or Medicine
Luvsanjamtsyn Tsogzolmaa	F	June 15, 1924	102 years, 160 days	Mongolian	Actress and singer
Lin Jiamei	F	June 21, 1924	102 years, 154 days	Chinese	First Lady of China; widow of president Li Xiannian
David W. Torrance	M	June 22, 1924	102 years, 153 days	British	Church minister
László Fuchs	M	June 24, 1924	102 years, 151 days	Hungarian-born American	Mathematician
Roberto Ledesma	M	June 26, 1924	102 years, 149 days	Cuban-born American	Bolero singer
Amos Horev	M	June 30, 1924	102 years, 145 days	Israeli	Military official and expert
Gwen Moffat	F	July 3, 1924	102 years, 142 days	British	Mountaineer and writer
Roy Gibson	M	July 4, 1924	102 years, 141 days	British	Aerospace engineer
Ip Chun	M	July 10, 1924	102 years, 135 days	Chinese	Martial artist
Nikos Valsamakis	M	July 17, 1924	102 years, 128 days	Greek	Architect and academic
Manolis Daponte	M	July 21, 1924	102 years, 124 days	Greek	Writer, folklorist, inventor and member of the Greek Resistance
Thích Thanh Từ	M	July 24, 1924	102 years, 121 days	Vietnamese	Zen Buddhist monk
Alice Toen	F	July 25, 1924	102 years, 120 days	Belgian	Actress
Arnold Harberger	M	July 27, 1924	102 years, 118 days	American	Economist
Betty Brussel	F	July 28, 1924	102 years, 117 days	Dutch-Canadian	Swimmer
Daniel Verstraete	M	July 31, 1924	102 years, 114 days	Belgian-born South African	Bishop
Magdalena Gamayo	F	August 13, 1924	102 years, 101 days	Filipino	Weaver
Lee Adams	M	August 14, 1924	102 years, 100 days	American	Lyricist
Qian Liren	M	August 20, 1924	102 years, 94 days	Chinese	Politician, diplomat and translator
Bill Greason	M	September 3, 1924	102 years, 80 days	American	Baseball player
Antonin Rolland	M	September 3, 1924	102 years, 80 days	French	Racing cyclist
Chen Ziyuan	M	September 7, 1924	102 years, 76 days	Chinese	Agricultural scientist and nuclear physicist
Maharaja Krishna Rasgotra	M	September 11, 1924	102 years, 72 days	Indian	Politician and academician
Şükrü Elekdağ	M	September 29, 1924	102 years, 54 days	Turkish	Politician, diplomat and academician
Manuel Edmilson da Cruz	M	October 3, 1924	102 years, 50 days	Brazilian	Prelate of Roman Catholic Church
Terry Gibbs	M	October 13, 1924	102 years, 40 days	American	Jazz vibraphonist and band leader
Teresa Cunillé	F	October 22, 1924	102 years, 31 days	Spanish	Actress
Susana Richa	F	October 22, 1924	102 years, 31 days	Panamanian	Politician, educator and essayist
Birgit Rausing	F	October 26, 1924	102 years, 27 days	Swedish	Art historian, philanthropist and billionaire heiress
He Jingzhi	M	November 5, 1924	102 years, 17 days	Chinese	Politician and poet
Victorinus Youn Kong-hi	M	November 8, 1924	102 years, 14 days	South Korean	Prelate of the Catholic Church
Shmuel Kamenetsky	M	November 12, 1924	102 years, 10 days	American	Haredi Rabbi
Wang Zhenyi	M	November 30, 1924	101 years, 357 days	Chinese	Patophysiologist and hematologist
Fernando de Mendonça	M	December 2, 1924	101 years, 355 days	Brazilian	Electronic engineer, researcher, founder and first director of National Institute for Space Research
Jakub Tomasz Nowakowski	M	December 4, 1924	101 years, 353 days	Polish	Zoologist, participant of the Warsaw Uprising and retired major of the Polish Armed Forces
Gaetano Bonicelli	M	December 13, 1924	101 years, 344 days	Italian	Prelate of the Catholic Church
Ali Mohammad Afghani	M	January 1, 1925	101 years, 325 days	Iranian	Writer
Achille Muller	M	January 1, 1925	101 years, 325 days	French	Military
Hal Gurnee	M	January 25, 1925	101 years, 301 days	American	Television director and producer
Ginette Kolinka	F	February 4, 1925	101 years, 291 days	French	Holocaust survivor
Rose Marie Dähncke	F	February 10, 1925	101 years, 285 days	German	Mycologist and author
Thomas Bernhard Seiler	M	February 10, 1925	101 years, 285 days	German	Psychologist
Julius Binder	M	February 12, 1925	101 years, 283 days	Swiss	Politician
Elizabeth Altino Teixeira	F	February 13, 1925	101 years, 282 days	Brazilian	Rural worker, militant and activist
Colette Fanara	F	February 15, 1925	101 years, 280 days	French	Artistic gymnast
Christa Meves	F	March 4, 1925	101 years, 263 days	German	Psychotherapist and writer
Jacques Heyman	M	March 8, 1925	101 years, 259 days	British	Construction engineer and professor
Duncan Ndegwa	M	March 11, 1925	101 years, 256 days	Kenyan	Civil servant
Leo Esaki	M	March 12, 1925	101 years, 255 days	Japanese	Physicist and recipient of the 1973 Nobel Prize in Physics
William Ferguson Reid	M	March 18, 1925	101 years, 249 days	American	Politician, physician and civil rights activist
Hossein Noori Hamedani	M	March 21, 1925	101 years, 246 days	Iranian	Marja
Thelma Ruby	F	March 23, 1925	101 years, 244 days	British	Actress
Janette Bertrand	F	March 25, 1925	101 years, 242 days	Canadian	Journalist, actress, educator and writer
Tobie Steinhouse	F	April 1, 1925	101 years, 235 days	Canadian	Painter and printmaker
Royce Williams	M	April 4, 1925	101 years, 232 days	American	Naval aviator
Brigitte Auber	F	April 27, 1925	101 years, 209 days	French	Actress
George Judge	M	May 2, 1925	101 years, 204 days	American	Econometrician and professor
Maurice R. Greenberg	M	May 4, 1925	101 years, 202 days	American	Business executive, former chairman and CEO of American International Group
Stanisław Aronson	M	May 6, 1925	101 years, 200 days	Polish-born Israeli	War veteran
Ricardo Primitivo González	M	May 12, 1925	101 years, 194 days	Argentine	Basketball player
Berta Jereb	F	May 25, 1925	101 years, 181 days	Slovenian	Oncologist and radiotherapist
Arnald Gabriel	M	May 31, 1925	101 years, 175 days	American	Commander
José Torres	M	June 4, 1925	101 years, 171 days	Venezuelan	Actor
Lester Crown	M	June 7, 1925	101 years, 168 days	American	Businessman
Günther Haase	M	June 11, 1925	101 years, 164 days	German	Olympic diver
J. P. Cross	M	June 21, 1925	101 years, 154 days	British-born Nepalese	Author and former British Army officer
Krishen Khanna	M	July 5, 1925	101 years, 140 days	Indian	Painter
Gloria Struck	F	July 7, 1925	101 years, 138 days	American	Motorcyclist
Ewa Krasnodebska	F	July 9, 1925	101 years, 136 days	Polish	Actress
Mahathir Mohamad	M	July 10, 1925	101 years, 135 days	Malaysian	Politician, prime minister (1981–2003; 2018–2020)
Eduardo Sued	M	July 10, 1925	101 years, 135 days	Brazilian	Painter
Anita Lasker-Wallfisch	F	July 17, 1925	101 years, 128 days	German-British	Holocaust survivor and cellist
Mohammad Hasan Sharq	M	July 17, 1925	101 years, 128 days	Afghan	Politician, head of government (1988–1989)
Adele Addison	F	July 24, 1925	101 years, 121 days	American	Soprano
Lidija Doroņina-Lasmane	F	July 28, 1925	101 years, 117 days	Latvian	Dissident
S. D. Phadnis	M	July 29, 1925	101 years, 116 days	Indian	Cartoonist and illustrator
Arturo Estrada Hernández	M	July 30, 1925	101 years, 115 days	Mexican	Painter
Giacomo Mosele	M	July 30, 1925	101 years, 115 days	Italian	Olympic skier
Peter Neuhof	M	July 30, 1925	101 years, 115 days	German	Journalist
Marv Levy	M	August 3, 1925	101 years, 111 days	American	Football coach
Marina Latorre	F	August 14, 1925	101 years, 100 days	Chilean	Writer and journalist
Abolghasem Saeedi	M	August 15, 1925	101 years, 99 days	Iranian	Painter
Kirke Mechem	M	August 16, 1925	101 years, 98 days	American	Composer
Angela Mary Doyle	F	August 19, 1925	101 years, 95 days	Irish-born Australian	Nun
Junior Bounous	M	August 24, 1925	101 years, 90 days	American	Skier
Wang Hanbin	M	August 28, 1925	101 years, 86 days	Chinese	Politician
Ludwig Sebus	M	September 5, 1925	101 years, 78 days	German	Singer and composer
Andreas Weissenbach	M	September 9, 1925	101 years, 74 days	German	Painter
Dick Lucas	M	September 10, 1925	101 years, 73 days	British	Anglican cleric
Martha Firestone Ford	F	September 16, 1925	101 years, 67 days	American	Businesswoman and former chairwoman of the Detroit Lions
Jan Vítek	M	September 16, 1925	101 years, 67 days	Czech	Civil engineer
Pete Murray	M	September 19, 1925	101 years, 64 days	British	Radio and television presenter
Angelo Acerbi	M	September 23, 1925	101 years, 60 days	Italian	Cardinal of the Catholic Church
Eve Brenner	F	September 24, 1925	101 years, 59 days	American	Actress
Bobby Shantz	M	September 26, 1925	101 years, 57 days	American	Baseball player
Mariya Gambaryan	F	October 1, 1925	101 years, 52 days	Russian	Pianist
Stanisław Zalewski	M	October 1, 1925	101 years, 52 days	Polish	Soldier
DeLoris Doederlein	F	October 6, 1925	101 years, 47 days	American	Politician and educator
André-Jacques Marie	M	October 14, 1925	101 years, 39 days	French	Hurdler
Egon Schöpf	M	October 16, 1925	101 years, 37 days	Austrian	Alpine skier
Theodore R. Britton Jr.	M	October 17, 1925	101 years, 36 days	American	Government official
Jiro Ono	M	October 27, 1925	101 years, 26 days	Japanese	Chef
Kenneth Onyeneke Orizu III	M	October 30, 1925	101 years, 23 days	Nigerian	Spiritual leader
Lee Grant	F	October 31, 1925	101 years, 22 days	American	Actress
Sara Estévez	F	November 4, 1925	101 years, 18 days	Spanish	Football journalist
Kevin O'Neill	M	November 14, 1925	101 years, 8 days	Australian	Soccer player
Johanna Quaas	F	November 20, 1925	101 years, 2 days	German	Gymnast
Chukka Ramaiah	M	November 20, 1925	101 years, 2 days	Indian	Educationist
Jacques de Saint-Blanquat	M	November 21, 1925	101 years, 1 day	French	Roman Catholic prelate
Tanko Yakasai	M	December 5, 1925	100 years, 352 days	Nigerian	Politician
G. Homer Harding	M	December 7, 1925	100 years, 350 days	American	Politician
Stanislav Kolíbal	M	December 11, 1925	100 years, 346 days	Czech	Artist and sculptor
Dick Van Dyke	M	December 13, 1925	100 years, 344 days	American	Actor and comedian
Cao Peng	M	December 22, 1925	100 years, 335 days	Chinese	Conductor
Roger F. Harrington	M	December 24, 1925	100 years, 333 days	American	Electrical engineer and professor
Maud von Rosen	F	December 24, 1925	100 years, 333 days	Swedish	Equestrian
Mario Arnello Romo	M	December 25, 1925	100 years, 332 days	Chilean	Politician
Carla Cordua	F	December 25, 1925	100 years, 332 days	Chilean	Philosopher
Leon Weintraub	M	January 1, 1926	100 years, 325 days	Polish-born Swedish	Holocaust remembrance activist and physician
W. Michael Blumenthal	M	January 3, 1926	100 years, 323 days	German-born American	Politician, businessman and secretary of the treasury (1977–1979)
Ninel Krutova	F	January 3, 1926	100 years, 323 days	Russian	Olympic diver
Margaret E. Bradshaw	F	January 4, 1926	100 years, 322 days	British	Botanist and conservationist
Hermann Klenner	M	January 5, 1926	100 years, 321 days	German	Jurist
Padma Charana Nayak	M	January 30, 1926	100 years, 296 days	Indian	Gandhian and columnist
Vladimir Zamansky	M	February 6, 1926	100 years, 289 days	Russian	Actor
Trude Klecker	F	February 7, 1926	100 years, 288 days	Austrian	Alpine skier
Georg Malin	M	February 8, 1926	100 years, 287 days	Liechtensteiner	Sculptor, artist, historian and politician
Nicolás Sánchez-Albornoz	M	February 11, 1926	100 years, 284 days	Spanish	Historian
Moshe Sternbuch	M	February 15, 1926	100 years, 280 days	British-born Israeli	Rabbi
David Frankham	M	February 16, 1926	100 years, 279 days	British	Actor
György Kurtág	M	February 19, 1926	100 years, 276 days	Romanian-born Hungarian	Composer
Sasa Ntario	F	February 21, 1926	100 years, 274 days	Greek	Dancer of the Greek National Opera, dance critic, and actress
Micheline Desmazières	F	February 23, 1926	100 years, 272 days	French	Olympic alpine skier
Vasile Constantin Niculae Ionescu-Galbeni	M	February 24, 1926	100 years, 271 days	Romanian	Politician
Ibrahim Abi-Ackel	M	March 2, 1926	100 years, 265 days	Brazilian	Politician
Giorgio Bongiovanni	M	March 4, 1926	100 years, 263 days	Italian	Olympic basketball player
Josef Svoboda	M	March 9, 1926	100 years, 258 days	Czech	World War II veteran
Aleksandr Zatsepin	M	March 10, 1926	100 years, 257 days	Russian	Composer
Elaine LaLanne	F	March 19, 1926	100 years, 248 days	American	Fitness expert and author
Ray Verhaeghe	M	March 19, 1926	100 years, 248 days	Belgian	Actor
Michel Rabinovitch	M	March 22, 1926	100 years, 245 days	Brazilian	Academic researcher, hematologist, professor and member of Brazilian Academy of Sciences
Roland Petersen	M	March 31, 1926	100 years, 236 days	Danish-born American	Painter
Tseng Wen-hui	F	March 31, 1926	100 years, 236 days	Taiwanese	First Lady of Taiwan; widow of president Lee Teng-hui
Shirley Ardener	F	April 1, 1926	100 years, 235 days	British	Anthropologist
Alix, Princess Napoléon	F	April 4, 1926	100 years, 232 days	French	Spouse of the head of the House of Bonaparte
Erik Bruun	M	April 7, 1926	100 years, 229 days	Finnish	Graphic designer
František Vnuk	M	April 8, 1926	100 years, 228 days	Slovak	Writer
Mavis Gilmour	F	April 13, 1926	100 years, 223 days	Jamaican	Politician and medical practitioner
Irmgard Edle von Traitteur	F	April 15, 1926	100 years, 221 days	German	Politician
Montserrat Torrent	F	April 17, 1926	100 years, 219 days	Spanish	Organist
Marilyn Erskine	F	April 24, 1926	100 years, 212 days	American	Actress
Bambi Linn	F	April 26, 1926	100 years, 210 days	American	Actress and dancer
Lamberto Pignotti	M	April 26, 1926	100 years, 210 days	Italian	Poet and writer
Grete Balle	F	April 26, 1926	100 years, 210 days	Danish	Painter
Andrey Moiseyenko	M	May 1, 1926	100 years, 205 days	Belarusian	Holocaust survivor
Allan Martin	M	May 2, 1926	100 years, 204 days	Australian	Television producer
Calvin W. Schuneman	M	May 7, 1926	100 years, 199 days	American	Politician
Sir David Attenborough	M	May 8, 1926	100 years, 198 days	British	Writer, broadcaster, environmentalist and naturalist
Philip Springer	M	May 12, 1926	100 years, 194 days	American	Composer
Antanas Juozas Gendrolis	M	May 14, 1926	100 years, 192 days	Lithuanian	Professor
Margaret Barton	F	May 27, 1926	100 years, 179 days	British	Actress
Abdoulaye Wade	M	May 29, 1926	100 years, 177 days	Senegalese	Politician and third president of Senegal (2000–2012)
Dagmar Nick	F	May 30, 1926	100 years, 176 days	German	Poet
Roscoe Bartlett	M	June 3, 1926	100 years, 172 days	American	Politician
Mina Kolb	F	June 7, 1926	100 years, 168 days	American	Actress and comedian
Sara Montes	F	June 7, 1926	100 years, 168 days	Mexican	Actress
David Cairns	M	June 8, 1926	100 years, 167 days	British	Journalist
Félix Revello de Toro	M	June 10, 1926	100 years, 165 days	Spanish	Painter
Krishnammal Jagannathan	F	June 16, 1926	100 years, 159 days	Indian	Social activist
Hildebrando Mendes Costa	M	June 16, 1926	100 years, 159 days	Brazilian	Prelate of Roman Catholic Church
Ivanka Mežan	F	June 18, 1926	100 years, 157 days	Slovenian	Actress
Gisela Schöbel-Graß	F	June 18, 1926	100 years, 157 days	German	Swimmer
Erna Schneider Hoover	F	June 19, 1926	100 years, 156 days	American	Mathematician, software engineer and inventor
Jô Clemente	F	June 20, 1926	100 years, 155 days	Brazilian	Philanthropist and founder of APAE
Yvette Lévy	F	June 21, 1926	100 years, 154 days	French	Holocaust survivor and educator
Fernando Mönckeberg Barros	M	June 26, 1926	100 years, 149 days	Chilean	Surgeon, doctor, professor, researcher and economist
Galina Vecherkovskaya	F	June 27, 1926	100 years, 148 days	Russian	Rower
Mel Brooks	M	June 28, 1926	100 years, 147 days	American	Actor, filmmaker, comedian, songwriter and playwright
Syed Babar Ali	M	June 30, 1926	100 years, 145 days	Pakistani	Businessman, philanthropist and politician
Günter Graulich	M	July 2, 1926	100 years, 143 days	German	Church musician and music publisher
Anthony Purssell	M	July 5, 1926	100 years, 140 days	British	Olympic rower, brewing executive and businessman
Teddy Reno	M	July 11, 1926	100 years, 134 days	Italian	Singer
David Steindl-Rast	M	July 12, 1926	100 years, 133 days	Austrian-born American	Benedictine monk, author and lecturer
Hyacinth Walters	F	July 15, 1926	100 years, 130 days	Jamaican	Olympic sprinter
Olusola Ajolore	M	July 24, 1926	100 years, 121 days	Nigerian	Academician
Heitor de Araújo Sales	M	July 29, 1926	100 years, 116 days	Brazilian	Prelate of Roman Catholic Church
Jacek Bocheński	M	July 29, 1926	100 years, 116 days	Polish	Writer
Annie Geeraerts	F	August 2, 1926	100 years, 112 days	Belgian	Actress
Betsy Jolas	F	August 5, 1926	100 years, 109 days	French-American	Composer
Doug McClelland	M	August 5, 1926	100 years, 109 days	Australian	Politician
Anthony E. Russo	M	August 8, 1926	100 years, 106 days	American	Politician
Heinz Fortak	M	August 11, 1926	100 years, 103 days	German	Meteorologist
Dave Lee	M	August 12, 1926	100 years, 102 days	British	Pianist
Everardo Zapata Santillana	M	August 15, 1926	100 years, 99 days	Peruvian	Teacher and author
Inger Exner	F	August 20, 1926	100 years, 94 days	Danish	Architect
Raúl López Mayorga	M	August 24, 1926	100 years, 90 days	Ecuadorian	Prelate of Roman Catholic Church
Saparinah Sadli	F	August 24, 1926	100 years, 90 days	Indonesian	Psychologist and activist
John Peoples	M	August 26, 1926	100 years, 88 days	American	Educator
René Depestre	M	August 29, 1926	100 years, 85 days	Haitian-French	Poet and political activist
Richard T. Spooner	M	September 10, 1926	100 years, 73 days	American	Marine Corps officer and restaurant proprietor
Jean-Pierre Serre	M	September 15, 1926	100 years, 68 days	French	Mathematician
Mohamed Chafik	M	September 17, 1926	100 years, 66 days	Moroccan	Writer
Bob Toski	M	September 18, 1926	100 years, 65 days	American	Golfer
Mischa Schwartz	M	September 21, 1926	100 years, 62 days	American	Electrical engineer
Kay Sekimachi	F	September 30, 1926	100 years, 53 days	American	Fiber artist and weaver
Gursaran Talwar	M	October 2, 1926	100 years, 51 days	Indian	Medical researcher
Gullbrand Sjöström	M	October 6, 1926	100 years, 47 days	Swedish	Javelin thrower
Opal Lee	F	October 7, 1926	100 years, 46 days	American	Teacher, counselor and activist
Pierre Castel	M	October 17, 1926	100 years, 36 days	French	Businessman and founder of Castel Group
Ken Smith	M	October 19, 1926	100 years, 34 days	American	Politician
Dorothy Rupert	F	October 20, 1926	100 years, 33 days	American	Politician
Lotte Schädle	F	October 23, 1926	100 years, 30 days	German	Operatic soprano
Dusan Sidjanski	M	October 23, 1926	100 years, 30 days	Swiss-Serbian	Political scientist
Milan Grygar	M	October 24, 1926	100 years, 29 days	Czech	Painter and artist
Claude Perdriel	M	October 25, 1926	100 years, 28 days	French	Publisher
Hilary Knight	M	November 1, 1926	100 years, 21 days	American	Illustrator
Oldřich Jelínek	M	November 2, 1926	100 years, 20 days	Czech	Designer and inventor
Valdas Adamkus	M	November 3, 1926	100 years, 19 days	Lithuanian	Politician, president (1998–2003; 2004–2009)
Laurence Rosenthal	M	November 4, 1926	100 years, 18 days	American	Film composer
Lola Fernández	F	November 15, 1926	100 years, 7 days	Colombian-born Costa Rican	Abstract painter
Ladislav Legenstein	M	November 19, 1926	100 years, 3 days	Croatian-born Austrian	Tennis player
Judith Magre	F	November 20, 1926	100 years, 2 days	French	Actress

== See also ==
- List of supercentenarians
