= List of supercentenarians =

People who have lived 110 years or longer

The following is a list of notable people who have attained the age of at least 110 years and are known for reasons other than just longevity. As such, this list does not include every person who has reached this age. For more specific lists of people (living or deceased) who are known for these reasons, see lists of centenarians.

For living people known just for their longevity, see List of oldest living people.

== List of supercentenarians, the oldest and most notable living people (110+) ==
Validated (Living)
Unvalidated

Name	Sex	Birth	Death	Age	Nationality	Continent	Reason for notability
Madeleine Dellamonica	F	23 July 1912	Living	114 years, 120 days	French	Europe	Egyptologist
Marita Camacho Quirós	F	10 March 1911	20 June 2025	114 years, 102 days	Costa Rican	North America	First Lady of Costa Rica and widow of President of Costa Rica Francisco Orlich Bolmarcich
Leila Denmark	F	1 February 1898	1 April 2012	114 years, 60 days	American	North America	Pediatrician who helped develop the pertussis vaccine
Virginia McLaurin	F	12 March 1909	14 November 2022	113 years, 247 days	American	North America	Community volunteer, seamstress, manager of a laundry and farmworker: Note: McLaurin's birth date is disputed. Several sources have claimed she was 105 at the time of her death.
Teresa Hsu	F	7 July 1898	7 December 2011	113 years, 153 days	Chinese-Singaporean	Asia	Charity worker, social worker, yoga teacher and nurse
Ruth Apilado	F	30 April 1908	15 August 2021	113 years, 107 days	American	North America	Newspaper editor, novelist, anti-racism campaigner for African-American civil rights, magazine founder and teacher
Ilie Ciocan	M	10 June 1913	27 May 2026	112 years, 351 days	Romanian	Europe	Soldier and World War II veteran
Shi Ping	M	1 November 1911	29 June 2024	112 years, 241 days	Chinese	Asia	Academic and political administrator
Luisa Sánchez	F	14 February 1884	5 October 1996	112 years, 234 days	Cuban-American	North America	Mother of Elvera Sanchez, former mother-in-law of Sammy Davis Sr. and grandmother of Sammy Jr.
Alphaeus Philemon Cole	M	12 July 1876	25 November 1988	112 years, 136 days	American	North America	Artist, engraver and etcher
Lawrence Brooks	M	12 September 1909	5 January 2022	112 years, 115 days	American	North America	Longest-lived American World War II veteran
Vera Korolyova	F	30 September 1914	Living	112 years, 51 days	Russian	Asia	Agricultural worker and Hero of Socialist Labour
Stanisław Kowalski	M	14 April 1910	5 April 2022	111 years, 356 days	Polish	Europe	Masters athlete
Theresa Bernstein	F	1 March 1890	13 February 2002	111 years, 349 days	Polish-American	Europe-North America	Artist and writer
Katherine Plunket	F	22 November 1820	14 October 1932	111 years, 327 days	Anglo-Irish	Europe	Aristocrat, botanical illustrator and the oldest person ever to die in Ireland
Shivakumara Swami	M	1 April 1907	21 January 2019	111 years, 295 days	Indian	Asia	Humanitarian, spiritual leader and educator
Maria Pogonowska	F	30 October 1897	15 July 2009	111 years, 258 days	Polish-Israeli	Europe-West Asia	Scientist
Dorothy Burnham	F	22 March 1915	Living	111 years, 243 days	American	North America	Civil rights activist and microbiologist
Juliana Young Koo	F	26 September 1905	24 May 2017	111 years, 240 days	Chinese-American	Asia-North America	Diplomat
Herman Smith-Johannsen	M	15 June 1875	5 January 1987	111 years, 204 days	Norwegian-Canadian	Europe-North America	Cross-country skier
Viola Fletcher	F	10 May 1914	24 November 2025	111 years, 198 days	American	North America	Longest-lived known survivor of the Tulsa race massacre
Frederica Sagor Maas	F	6 July 1900	5 January 2012	111 years, 183 days	American	North America	Screenwriter, playwright, memoirist and author
Qin Hanzhang	M	19 February 1908	15 August 2019	111 years, 177 days	Chinese	Asia	Engineer and scientist
Edith Renfrow Smith	F	14 July 1914	2 January 2026	111 years, 172 days	American	North America	First African-American woman to graduate from Grinnell College
Emma Didlake	F	13 March 1904	16 August 2015	111 years, 156 days	American	North America	Soldier (Women's Army Auxiliary Corps)
Anne Baker	F	14 May 1914	23 September 2025	111 years, 132 days	British	Europe	Writer and fundraiser
Alexander Imich	M	4 February 1903	8 June 2014	111 years, 124 days	Polish	Europe	Chemist, parapsychologist, zoologist and writer
Manolita Piña	F	24 February 1883	11 June 1994	111 years, 107 days	Spanish-Uruguayan	Europe-South America	Painter and widow of Joaquín Torres-García
Ruthie Tompson	F	22 July 1910	10 October 2021	111 years, 80 days	American	North America	Camera technician and animation checker
Cecilia Seghizzi	F	5 September 1908	22 November 2019	111 years, 78 days	Italian	Europe	Composer, painter and teacher
Ram Nath Sharma	M	5 November 1904	1 December 2015	111 years, 26 days	Indian	Asia	Judge
Luís Torras	M	29 December 1912	14 January 2024	111 years, 16 days	Spanish	Europe	Painter
Silas Simmons	M	14 October 1895	29 October 2006	111 years, 15 days	American	North America	Longest-lived American semi-professional and professional baseball player
Zhou Youguang	M	13 January 1906	14 January 2017	111 years, 1 day	Chinese	Asia	Economist, banker, linguist, sinologist, Esperantist, publisher and "father of Pinyin"
James Clayton Flowers	M	25 December 1915	Living	110 years, 330 days	American	North America	Tuskegee Airman
Nicholas Kao Se Tseien	M	15 January 1897	11 December 2007	110 years, 330 days	Chinese	Asia	Trappist priest and oldest person ever to have a cataract operation
Leopold Vietoris	M	4 June 1891	9 April 2002	110 years, 309 days	Austrian	Europe	Mathematician and World War I veteran
Zoltan Sarosy	M	23 August 1906	19 June 2017	110 years, 300 days	Hungarian-Canadian	Europe-North America	Chess master
Huang Mulan	F	9 July 1906	7 February 2017	110 years, 213 days	Chinese	Asia	Spy
Laura Scales	F	13 November 1879	12 June 1990	110 years, 211 days	American	North America	Educator and Smith College dean
Carla Porta Musa	F	15 March 1902	10 October 2012	110 years, 209 days	Italian	Europe	Essayist and poet
Donald Rose	M	24 December 1914	11 July 2025	110 years, 199 days	British	Europe	World War II veteran
Lucio Chiquito Caicedo	M	22 May 1916	13 November 2026	110 years, 175 days	Colombian	South America	Engineer and degree holder
Muazzez İlmiye Çığ	F	20 June 1914	17 November 2024	110 years, 150 days	Turkish	Asia	Archaeologist, sumerologist, assyriologist and writer
Morrie Markoff	M	11 January 1914	3 June 2024	110 years, 144 days	American	North America	Blogger, writer, artist and oldest known active blogger in the world
Bhante Dharmawara	M	12 February 1889	26 June 1999	110 years, 134 days	Cambodian	Asia	Theravada monk and educator
Zhang Lixiong	M	21 November 1913	2 April 2024	110 years, 133 days	Chinese	Asia	Military officer and politician
Elza Brandeisz	F	18 September 1907	6 January 2018	110 years, 110 days	Hungarian	Europe	Teacher, artist and humanitarian for Righteous Among the Nations
Anita Mackey	F	1 January 1914	16 April 2024	110 years, 106 days	American	North America	Social worker
Lois Holden	F	2 February 1910	5 May 2020	110 years, 93 days	American	North America	Singer and member of the Gospel Stars, who released the first Motown album in the label's history
Bruno Kant	M	26 February 1916	29 May 2026	110 years, 92 days	German	Europe	Priest
Alice Herz-Sommer	F	26 November 1903	23 February 2014	110 years, 89 days	Czech	Europe	Classic pianist, music teacher and one of the oldest Holocaust survivors
Abby Crawford Milton	F	6 February 1881	2 May 1991	110 years, 85 days	American	North America	Suffragist
Zheng Ji	M	6 May 1900	29 July 2010	110 years, 84 days	Chinese	Asia	Nutritionist and biochemist
Eileen Ash	F	30 October 1911	3 December 2021	110 years, 34 days	British	Europe	Cricketer and spy
Moon Fun Chin	M	13 April 1913	9 May 2023	110 years, 26 days	Chinese-American	Asia-North America	Chinese-American aviator, businessman and China National Aviation Corporation pilot
Yakup Satar	M	11 March 1898	2 April 2008	110 years, 22 days	Turkish	Asia	Last surviving Turkish veteran of World War I
Eileen Kramer	F	8 November 1914	15 November 2024	110 years, 7 days	Australian	Oceania	Dancer, artist, performer and choreographer
Hélène Guisan-Démétriadès	F	16 November 1916	Living	110 years, 4 days	Swiss	Europe	Writer, poet and teacher
Norman Spencer	M	13 August 1914	16 August 2024	110 years, 3 days	British	Europe	Film producer, production manager and screenwriter
Jane Ising	F	2 February 1902	2 February 2012	110 years, 0 days	German-American	Europe-North America	Economist

== See also ==
- List of living centenarians
- List of oldest living people
- List of the verified oldest people
