= Yang You (scientist) =

Chinese scientist (born 1917)

- 杨槱
- Born: October 17, 1917 (age 108); Beijing, China
- Education: University of Glasgow
- Scientific career
- Fields: Naval Architecture
- Workplaces: Shanghai Jiao Tong University
- Notable students: Huang Xuhua, Xu Qinan, Zhu Yingfu

Chinese name
- Traditional Chinese: 楊槱
- Simplified Chinese: 杨槱
Transcriptions
Standard Mandarin
- Hanyu Pinyin: Yáng Yǒu
- Wade–Giles: Yang Yu

Yang You (Chinese: 杨槱; born 17 October 1917) is a Chinese scientist and former president of Sanda University between 1992 and 1997. Yang is the teacher of Huang Xuhua (father of China's nuclear submarines), Xu Qinan (general designer of Jiaolong), Zhu Yingfu (general designer of Chinese aircraft carrier Liaoning), and Zeng Hengyi (designer of China's first offshore oil drilling vessel).

Yang is a member of the Jiusan Society, he was a member of its 6th Central Committee, a member of its 7th Standing Committee, vice-president of its 8th and 9th Central Committee, and honorary vice-president of its 10th Central Committee. He was a delegate to the 5th and 6th National People's Congress. He was a member of the 7th and 8th Standing Committee of the Chinese People's Political Consultative Conference.

== Name ==
Yang's first name, You, was given by Sun Bingwen (one of the early leaders of the Chinese Communist Party), who adapted it from the sentence 芃芃棫朴，薪之槱之 in the Classic of Poetry.

== Biography ==
Yang was born in Beijing on October 17, 1917. His father Yang Zongjiong was a senior statesman of the Kuomintang. His ancestral home is in Jurong, Jiangsu. He primarily studied at Sun Yat-sen University Primary School and Jinling Middle School. In 1930 he entered Peizheng High School, where he began to like shipbuilding. In 1935 he arrived in the United Kingdom at the age of 18 to begin his education at the University of Glasgow. Every summer in university, he went to Kerr Shipyard to train as an apprentice and a draftsman.

Yang returned to China in May 1940, in the midst of the Second Sino-Japanese War, and became a lecturer at Tongji University and Shanghai Jiao Tong University, then exiled in Chongqing because of the war. He served as an engineer of Chongqing Minsheng Machinery Factory between 1940 and 1944. In November 1944 he was sent to shipyards and schools across the East Coast of the United States to study ship design and construction, production planning management, and engine repair. He returned to China in January 1946 and successively served as engineer of the Navy Jiangnan Shipbuilding Bureau, Navy Qingdao Shipbuilding Bureau and Shanghai Naval Machinery College.

After the establishment of the People's Republic of China in 1949, he successively served as professor at Tongji University and Dalian Institute of Technology, director of Dalian Shipyard, assistant chief engineer of the Sino-Soviet Shipbuilding Company. In 1955, Dalian Institute of Technology was merged into Shanghai Jiao Tong University, Yang moved to Shanghai with the institute. Yang became the founding director of the Institute of its Ship and Marine Engineering in September 1978. In May 1980 he concurrently served as vice-president of Zhenjiang Shipping College. In November 1981 he was elected as a member of the Chinese Academy of Sciences (CAS). In December 1992 he was appointed president of Sanda University, and held that office until December 1997.
