= Weintraub =

Weintraub is a German Jewish surname meaning "wine grape". It is cognate with the Yiddish name Vayntrub. Notable people with the surname include:

- Jacqueline Vayntrub, American biblical scholar
- Milana Vayntrub, American actress
- Aharon Ze'ev Weintraub, birth name of Aharon Ze'ev, Israeli writer, editor, and educator
- Abraham Weintraub, Brazilian banker and politician
- Annette Weintraub, American artist and writer
- Amir Weintraub, Israeli tennis player
- Carl Weintraub, American actor
- David Weintraub (official), American politician
- E. Roy Weintraub, American economist
- Fred Weintraub, American producer
- Harold M. Weintraub, American biological scientist
- Jerry Weintraub, American film producer
- Jessica Weintraub, Australian rhythmic gymnast
- Joseph Weintraub, American judge
- Karl Weintraub, Historian
- Leon Weintraub, Polish-born Swedish physician and Holocaust survivor
- Maia Weintraub, American fencer
- Phil Weintraub, American baseball player
- Russell J. Weintraub, American lawyer
- Scott Weintraub, cast member of Big Brother 4 (U.S.)
- Sidney Weintraub (economist born 1914), American economist
- Sidney Weintraub (economist born 1922), American economist
- Stanley Weintraub, American historian
- Sy Weintraub, American producer and an owner of Panavision

== See also ==
- Weinrib (surname)
- Weinreb (surname)
- Weinraub
