= Quaas =

Quaas is a surname. Notable people with the surname include:

- Johanna Quaas (born 1925), German gymnast
- Tom Quaas (born 1965), German actor
