= Weinraub =

Weinraub, an Ashkenazi Jewish variant of Weintraub

- Bernard Weinraub
- Leilah Weinraub
- Munio Weinraub

== See also ==
- Weinrib
