= Richard Spooner =

Richard Spooner may refer to:

- Richard Spooner (MP) (1783–1864), British Member of Parliament and businessman
- Richard Spooner (equestrian), American show jumping rider
- Richard T. Spooner (born 1925), former United States Marine Corps officer
- Dick Spooner (Richard Thompson Spooner, 1919–1997), English cricketer
