= James Flowers =

James Flowers may refer to:

- James Clayton Flowers (born 1915), member of the Tuskegee Airmen
- J. Christopher Flowers, American private equity investor and investment manager
