= Weinreb =

Weinreb is a Yiddish surname. Notable people with the surname include:

- Joseph Weinreb (1869–1943), first chief rabbi of Toronto, Canada.
- Daniel Weinreb (1959–2012), American programmer
- Friedrich Weinreb (1910–1988), Jewish theologian
- Lloyd Weinreb (1936–2021), Harvard Law School Professor
- Steven M. Weinreb (born 1941), Penn State University Chemistry Professor
- Tzvi Hersh Weinreb (born 1940), Rabbi and Executive Vice President of the Orthodox Union

== See also ==
- Weinrib
