= Nahman ben Samuel ha-Levi =

Naḥman ben Samuel ha-Levi (Hebrew: נחמן בן שמואל הלוי 1721 – 1792) was a Frankist rabbi, who lived in Busk, Galicia, in the first part of the eighteenth century. When Mikulski, the administrator of the archbishopric of Lemberg, invited the representatives of Judaism to a disputation with the Frankists on July 16, 1759, Naḥman was one of the Frankist delegates. On his baptism into the Christian faith he took the name of Piotr Jacobski.
