= Busk, Ukraine =

City in Lviv Oblast, Ukraine

Busk Буськ
- City
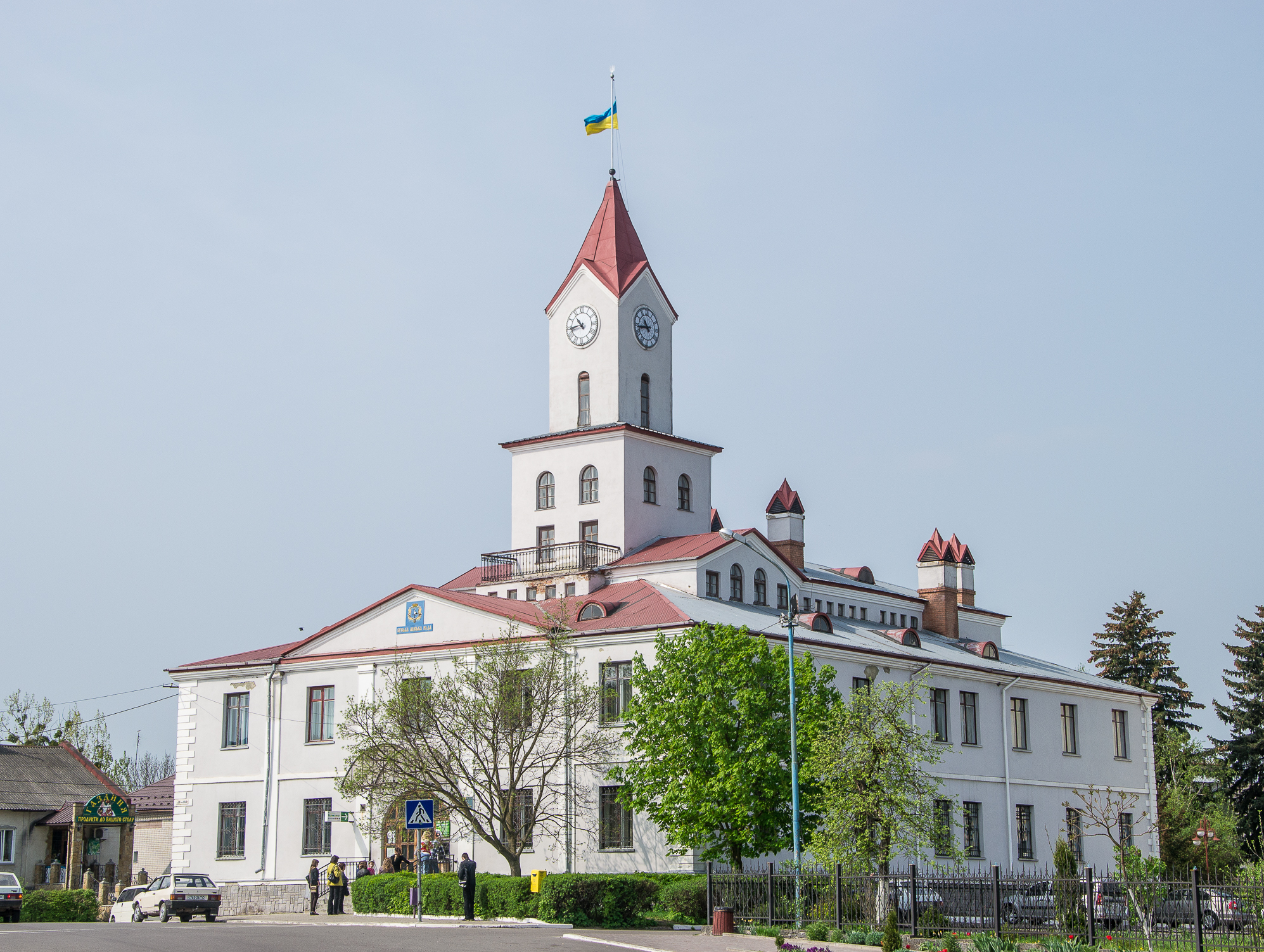
- Busk City Hall

- Coat of arms

- Location within Lviv Oblast Location within Ukraine
- Coordinates: 49°58′0″N 24°37′0″E
- Country: Ukraine
- Oblast: Lviv Oblast
- Raion: Zolochiv Raion
- Hromada: Busk urban hromada

Area
  - Total: 9.0 km^{2} (3.5 sq mi)

Population (2022)
  - Total: 8,662
  - Density: 960/km^{2} (2,500/sq mi)
- Time zone: UTC+2 (EET)
  - Summer (DST): UTC+3 (EEST)
- Postal code: 80500—80505
- Area code: +380-3264
- Sister cities: Ropczyce

Busk (Ukrainian: Буськ, IPA: [busʲk]; Polish: Busk) is a city located in Zolochiv Raion in Lviv Oblast (region) of western Ukraine. It hosts the administration of Busk urban hromada, one of the hromadas of Ukraine. Population: 8,662 (2022 estimate). 8,355 (2023 estimate).

Until 18 July 2020 it was the administrative center of the Busk Raion, which has since been disestablished.

Busk was the birthplace of Yevhen Petrushevych, the president of the West Ukrainian National Republic.

== History ==
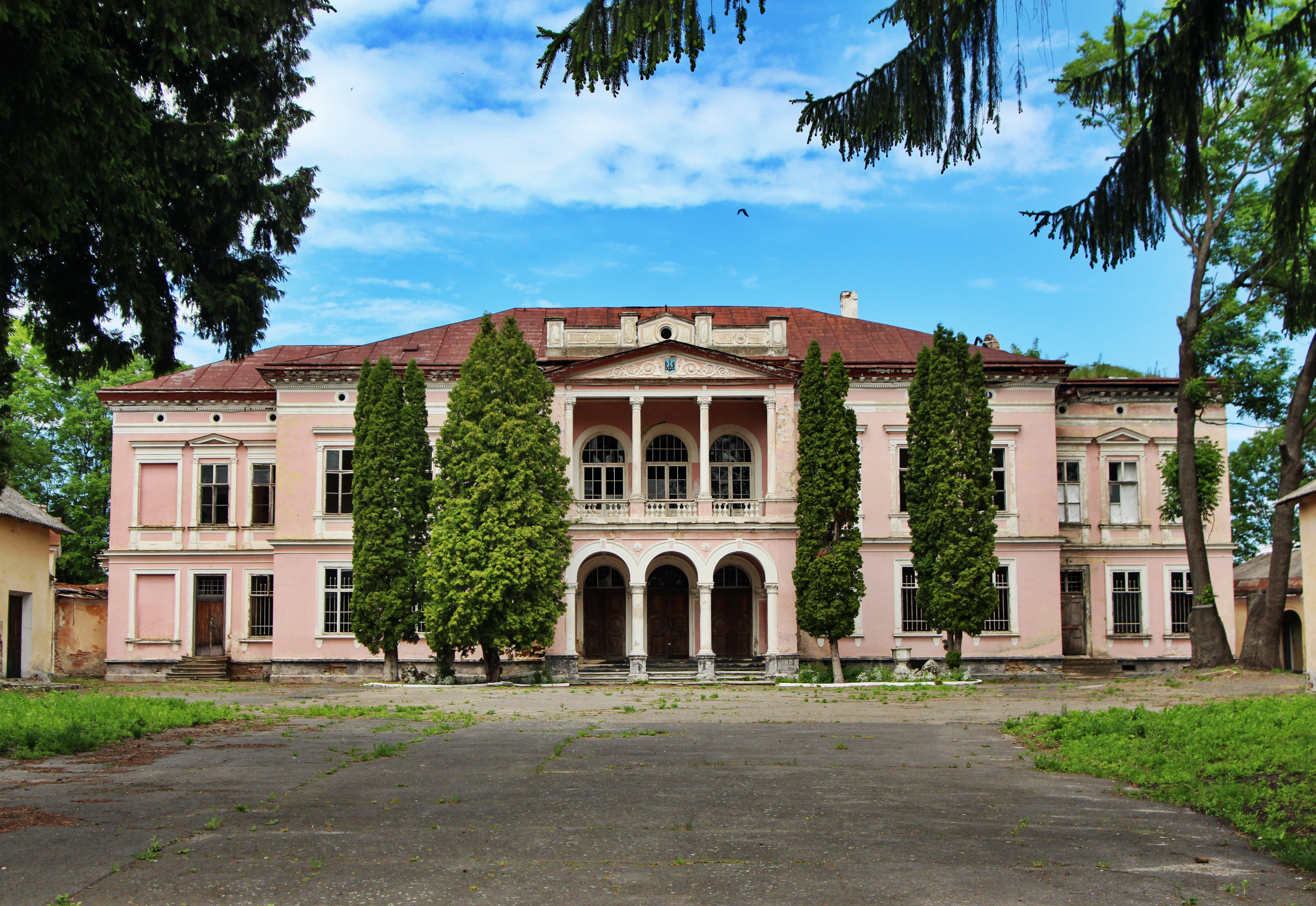
Badeni Palace

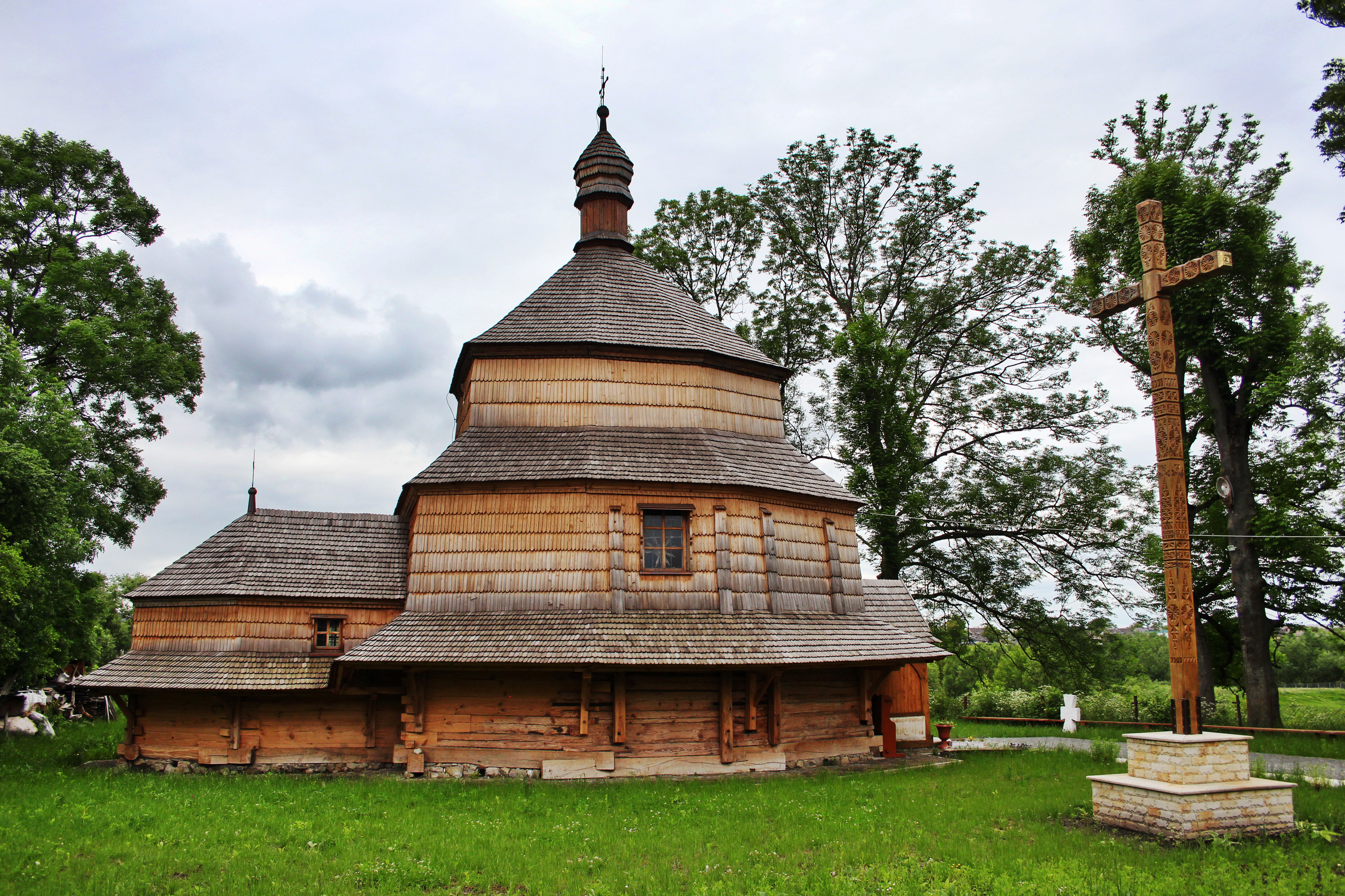
Wooden church of St. Paraskeva

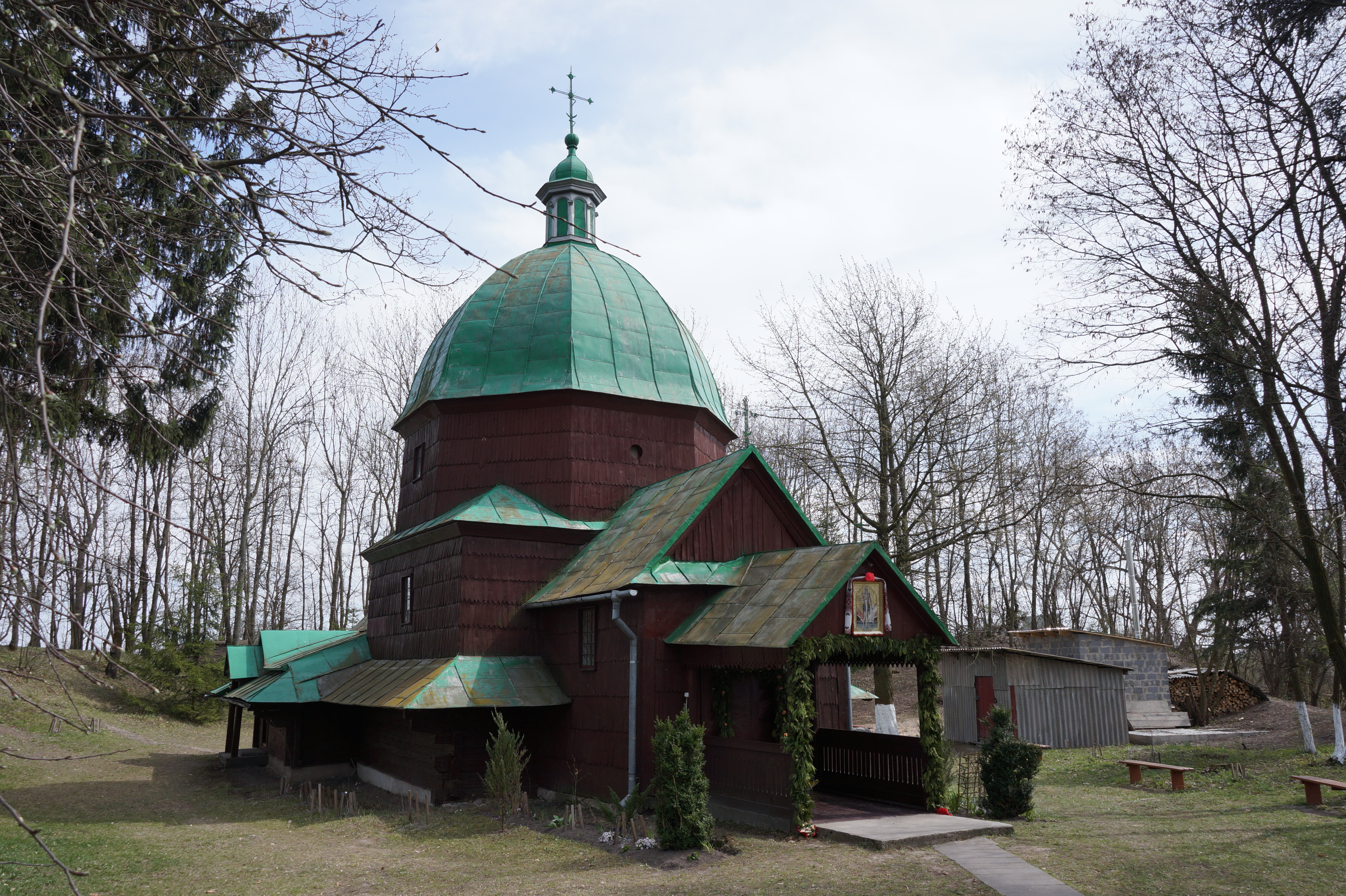
Church of St. Onuphrius

Busk has a long history. It was first mentioned in the 1097 Primary Chronicle as Bug city (Old East Slavic: бужьсъкъ городъ), in the context of a dispute between Rus' princes for the border area between the principalities of Halych and Volhynia. The city was named due to its location near the Western Bug river, which is locally known as the Bug river.

Busk was granted a town charter in 1411 by Siemowit IV, Duke of Masovia. In the Polish–Lithuanian Commonwealth, it belonged to the Belz Voivodeship in the Lesser Poland Province, and was the seat of a separate administrative unit, the Land of Busk. The town remained part of Poland until the First Partition of Poland (1772), when it was seized by the Habsburg Empire, and remained in Austrian Galicia until 1918. In 1913, the population of Busk was 8,000, including 3,500 Poles, 2,700 Jews and 1,800 Ukrainians. In the interwar period, Busk belonged to Kamionka Buska County, Tarnopol Voivodeship, until the Soviet invasion of Poland in September 1939.

Historical population
Year	Pop.	±%
1921	6,148	—
1931	7,010	+14.0%
2022	8,662	+23.6%

Busk had a very active Jewish community before World War II. The first synagogue was built in 1502. The old Jewish cemetery was renowned. On July 1, 1941, German forces occupied Busk. The Jewish population was transferred to a ghetto, and then murdered on May 21, 1943. 1500 Jews perished during this operation. A witness recalled of the executions of the Jews: "All middle-aged Jews were gathered to work. Then, they were taken to the execution site...while others dug the pits." From May to November 1943, the Germans operated a forced labour camp for Jews in the town. Raisel Meltzak, a Jewish child from Busk, was among the first Holocaust survivors to have her testimony recorded when she was interviewed by David P. Boder at a home for displaced Jewish orphans in France on September 8, 1946.

Until 18 July 2020, Busk was the administrative center of Busk Raion. The raion was abolished in July 2020 as part of the administrative reform of Ukraine, which reduced the number of raions of Lviv Oblast to seven. The area of Busk Raion was merged into Zolochiv Raion.

== International relations ==
=== Twin towns – Sister cities ===
Busk is twinned with

- Ropczyce in Poland

== Notable people ==
- Alice Habsburg
- Yevhen Petrushevych
- Chanoch Dov Padwa
- Moritz Szeps
- Ilarion Svientsitskyi
- Joseph Weinreb
- Nahman ben Samuel ha-Levi
