= Joseph Weinreb =

Chief rabbi of Toronto in early 20th century

Rabbi Joseph (Yosef) Weinreb
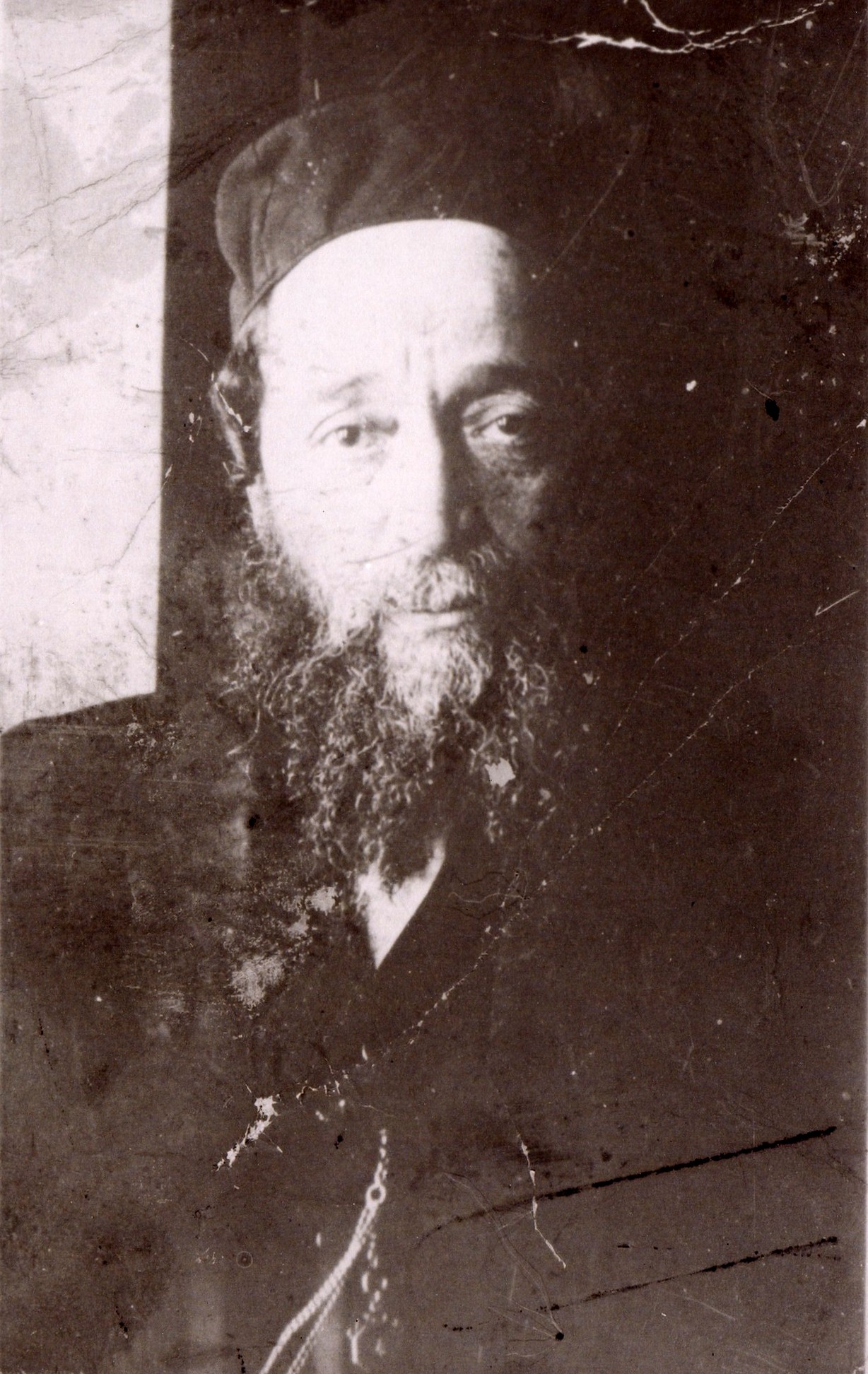
- Rabbi Joseph Weinreb, c. 1917
- Title: Rabbi

Personal life
- Born: Yosef Weinreb; 1869 Busk, Galicia
- Died: 1942 (aged 72–73) Toronto
- Buried: Jones Avenue Cemetery, Toronto

Religious life
- Religion: Judaism
- Denomination: Orthodox

Jewish leader
- Successor: Gedalia Felder
- Organisation: Shomrai Shabbos congregation
- Began: 1900
- Ended: 1942

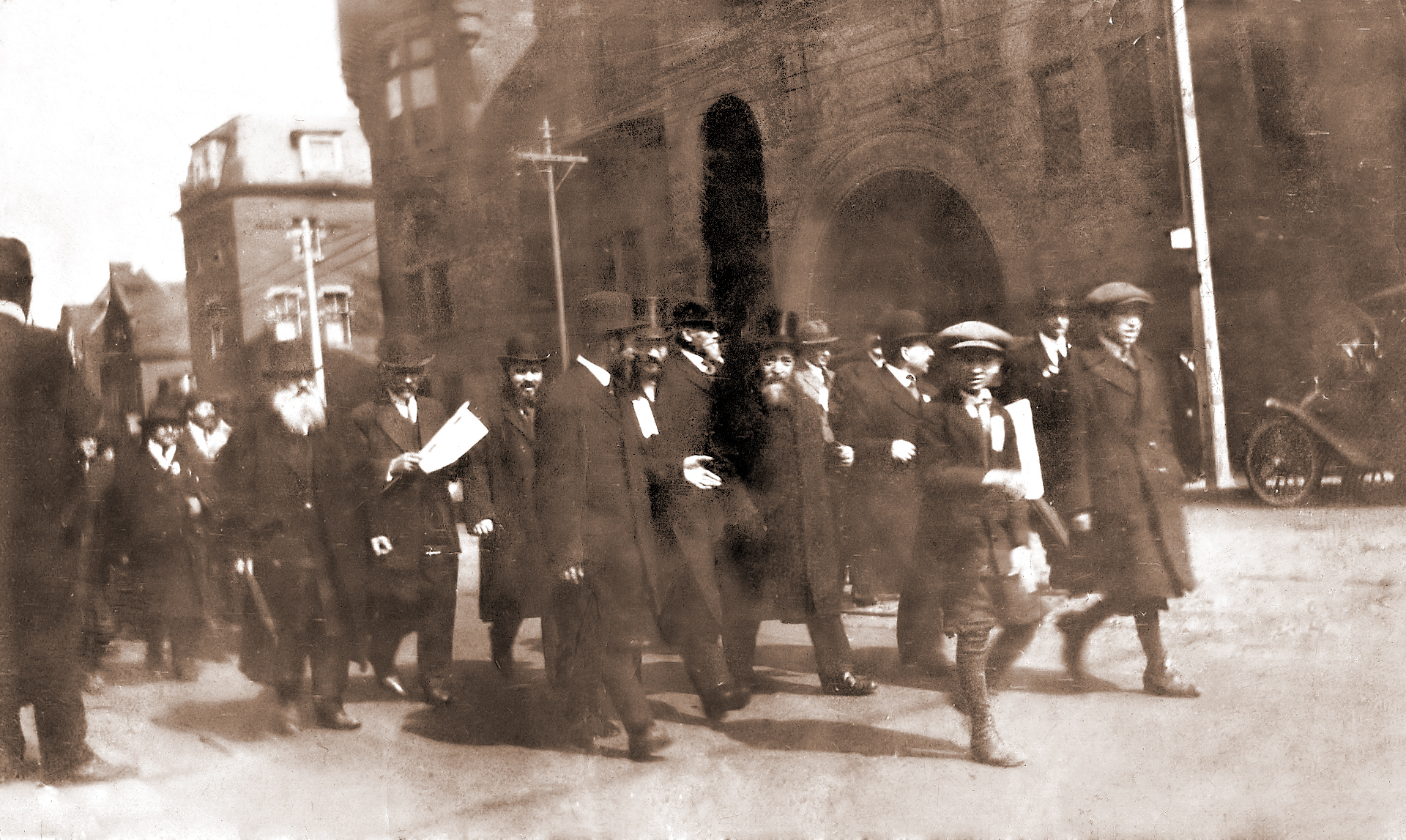
A march in support of the Balfour Declaration in 1917, in front of the parliament building in Toronto, Canada. The man in the shiny black top hat is Rabbi Joseph Weinreb, the chief rabbi of Toronto at the time.

Joseph (Yosef) Weinreb (1869–1943), also known as the "Galitzianer Rav," was the first chief rabbi of Toronto, Canada.

== Biography ==
Joseph Weinreb was born in Busk, Galicia, son of Rabbi Baruch Shlomo Weinreb and his wife Soore Ratze.

== Rabbinic career ==
He worked as a rabbi in Iași, Romania after receiving his smicha (rabbinical ordination) from the Brejaner Rebbe. Around the year 1900, he received an invitation at the suggestion of his brother-in-law, Binyamin Kurtz, who was living in Toronto at that time, to serve as the rabbi of Toronto's Shomrai Shabbos congregation. The congregation had just purchased a building on Chestnut Street. Weinreb moved to Toronto with his two daughters, Malka and Lil, after his wife, Ethel, died in childbirth. In Toronto, he married his niece, Freyda, with whom he had three more children, Soore Ratze, Sol and Ruth. The rabbi purchased a home on Henry Street across from the Poilishe Shul, and continued to head the congregation for more than 40 years. After an ideological split in the congregation, a new synagogue was built on Terauley Street, on land donated by Zelig Shapira.

Weinreb died on October 15, 1943, in Toronto. His successor was Rabbi Gedalia Felder.

== See also ==
- History of the Jews in Toronto
