= Klaus Obermeyer =

German-American businessman

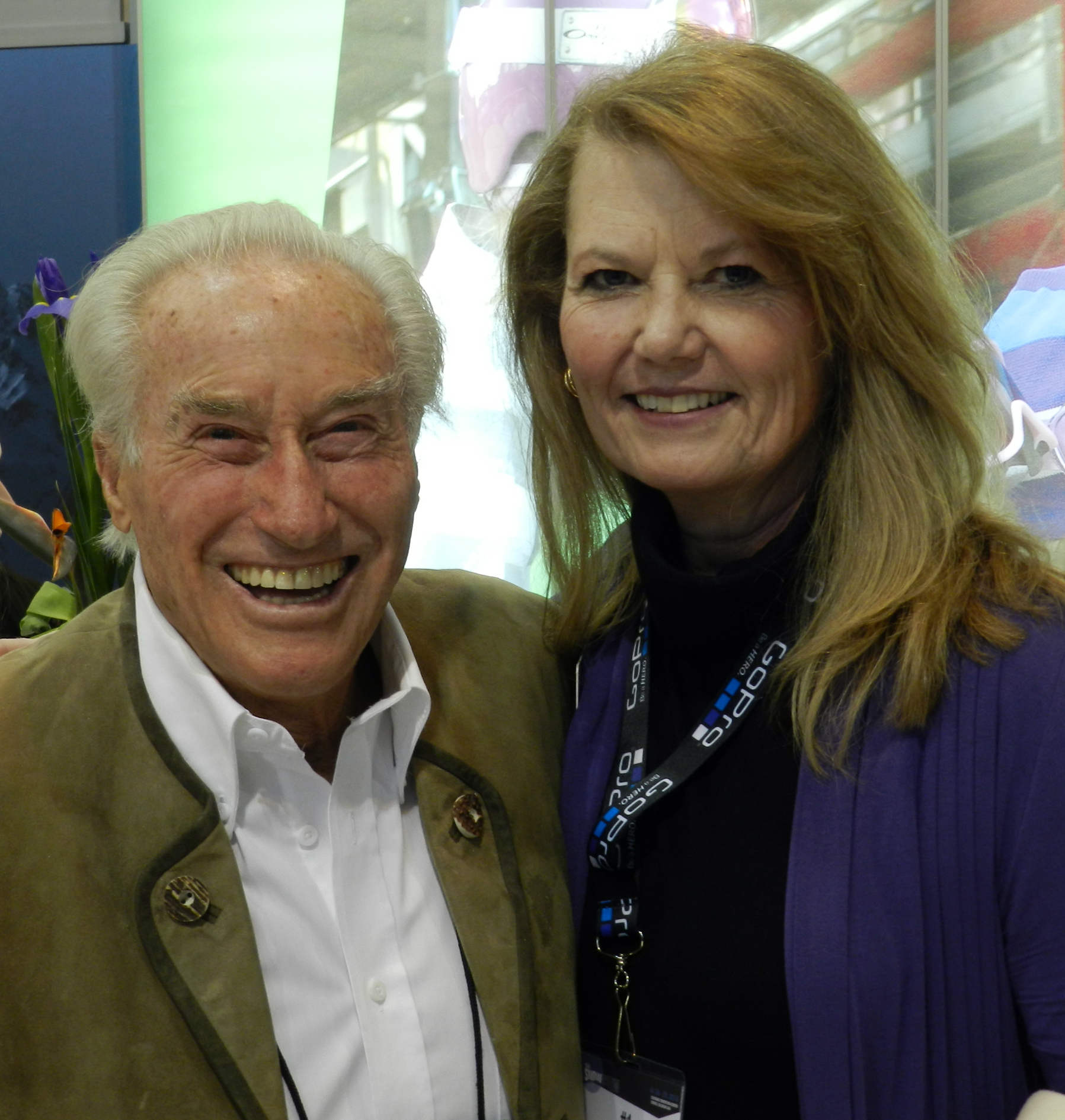
- Obermeyer (left) with former Colorado State Senator Jean White in 2011
- Born: Klaus F. Obermeyer; December 2, 1919 (age 106); Oberstaufen, Germany
- Website: obermeyer.com

Klaus F. Obermeyer (born December 2, 1919) is a German-born American businessman who is the founder of Sport Obermeyer, Ltd.

== Biography ==
In 1947, Klaus arrived in Aspen, Colorado, where his friend Friedl Pfeiffer had opened the Aspen Ski School. Over the next twelve years, he spent his days working as a ski instructor on Aspen Mountain. He founded Sport Obermeyer based on insights he had gained about skiwear while working as an instructor and started the business in the attic of his home. There, one of the first of many innovations was born in the form of a down ski parka stitched together from his goose down comforter. After that came high-altitude suntan lotion, turtlenecks, nylon wind-shirts, mirrored sunglasses, the Boot Fit Press and more. In 1961, the first Sport Obermeyer factory warehouse opened in Aspen, and the innovations continued with “soft-shell” jackets, double lens goggles, the first waterproof, breathable fabrics, a built-in ski boot canting system and fashion-conscious skiwear.

== Awards ==
Klaus was inducted into the U.S. National Ski and Snowboard Hall of Fame in 1997. He was also inducted into the Colorado Business Hall of Fame in 2015 by Junior Achievement-Rocky Mountain and the Denver Metro Chamber of Commerce. In a news story published in early December, 2017, The Aspen Times reported that Obermeyer continues to work as his company's CEO and had just celebrated his 98th birthday.

== Innovations ==
Among Klaus's many innovations, some of the most notable are:

- The quilted down parka, stitched together from his own down comforter.
- The first mirrored ski sunglasses from vaporized metal.
- The first nylon windshirt.
- With Friedl Pfeiffer, the first high-altitude suntan lotion.
- A dual-layer ski boot, the first with a warm liner and rigid exterior shell.
- The first turtlenecks with elasticized collars.
- The 2-prong ski brakes.

== 100th birthday celebration ==
On Obermeyer's 100th birthday, on December 2, 2019, the City of Aspen threw a large birthday party in his honor. Held in the ballroom of the Hotel Jerome, the celebration began with a private party at 1:00 PM followed by a party open to the public at 3:00. At the party, according to the Aspen Times, "Women showered him with kisses. Men gave hearty handshakes. Tons of people took selfies with Obermeyer, one of the original ski instructors on Aspen Mountain ...".
