= Dieter Gruen =

German-born American scientist (born 1922)

Dieter Martin Gruen
- Born: November 21, 1922 (age 103); Germany
- Known for: Actinide radioactive elements research; Safer nuclear reactor design research; Sputtered species research; Fusion research; Metal hydride research; Diamond films research; Graphene Solar Cells research
- Spouse: Dolores Gruen (died 2015)

Dieter Martin Gruen (born November 21, 1922) is a German-born American scientist, who was a senior member of the Materials Science Division at Argonne National Laboratory. He received B.S. (1944, cum laude) and M.S. (1947) degrees in chemistry from Northwestern University and the Ph.D. (1951) in chemical physics from the University of Chicago.

Gruen made contributions in a broad range of topics in the chemistry of materials: the definitive establishment of the 5f character of the actinides by the measurement and ligand field interpretation of magnetic moments at low temperatures; the creation of a solution chemistry in fused salts using spectroscopy to determine oxidation states, complex ions, and coordination equilibrium of transition metal ions; the elucidation of the interactions of reactive molecular and atomic species with noble gas matrixes; the rational design of metal alloy hydrides for energy storage and heat pump applications; the determination of the energetic and depth of origin of sputtered species; ultra sensitive detection of atoms and molecules using laser fluorescence and resonance ionization mass spectrometry; the discovery and development of a new chemical vapor deposition process for the synthesis of phase-pure nano-crystalline diamond films and the development of graphene-based photovoltaic cells.

Gruen worked at Argonne National Laboratory for over 60 years, retiring in 2012. The following provides more detail on his lifetime of work as a scientist in chemistry, materials science and energy science.

== Research ==
=== Manhattan project ===
Member of the scientific team at the Oak Ridge site that developed the Uranium bomb dropped on Hiroshima. Gruen's work focused on the development of a novel chemical method to separate the U235 from the U238 Uranium isotopes. U-235 was then concentrated for use in the Atomic bomb.

=== Actinide radioactive elements research ===
Gruen's work over 15 years led to these element's definitive characterization as 5F in the Periodic Table. This was crucial to their use in nuclear reactors and nuclear power packs used in cardiac pacemakers.

=== Safer nuclear reactor design research ===
Gruen's work enabled the creation of designs for safer nuclear reactors. Instead of producing trans-plutonium waste, much less toxic U233 would be produced. As opposed to Chernobyl and Fukushima, these newer reactors, using Thorium as fuel, would be much safer and the radioactive waste disposal would be much easier. New research is once again underway using this approach.

=== Sputtered species research ===
Gruen developed ultra-sensitive ion measurement techniques using laser spectroscopy, the method still used today to determine meteorite isotopic composition. Meteorite composition analysis contributes to the formulation of theories about the evolution of the universe including the stellar nuclear-synthesis theory.

=== Fusion research ===
Gruen used ultra-sensitive ion measurement techniques for his research on nuclear fusion reactors. Plasma cloud containment remains a fundamental hurdle in fusion research. Gruen developed an approach for coating the cloud containment vessel walls with a self-removing copper/lithium compound. This enables the plasma cloud to remain contained longer, a key step toward eventually enabling a fusion reaction to occur.

=== Metal hydride research ===
Gruen performed heat pump technology research including a solar powered heat pump. This technology is commercialized and is currently being used for hydrogen “getters,” which absorb hydrogen produced in various industrial processes.

=== Material research ===
==== Diamond films ====
Gruen invented a radically new method for making diamond films by chemical vapor deposition (CVD). He researched and patented this process for deposition from a plasma cloud of very smooth, very thin (mono-atomic layers) aligned carbon atoms in a diamond molecular structure. This is known as an Ultrananocrystalline diamond (UNCD) film. These films are doped to make them semi-conductors. They form a structure similar to silicon and can be made as either P or N types for use in diodes to conduct electricity. Applications include improved micro-electronics which has been commercially developed for medical applications including as an electrode in an artificial retina. These diamond films can also be used for mechanical processes that require low friction and low wear such as ultra-long-lasting pump seals. This has been commercially developed for water purification pumps. In addition, UNCD is used for a process that produces hydrogen for use in a fuel cell.

==== Graphene Solar Cells ====
Gruen's current research involves creating a revolutionary graphene-based photovoltaic (PV) cell. He has now produced, using laboratories within the University of Illinois, Chicago, a prototype graphene PV that has the highest voltage of any PVs available today (2021). He holds the US and foreign patents for the development and use of these graphene PVs. The most recent and most comprehensive US patent, entitled "High efficiency graphene/wide band-gap semiconductor heterojunction solar cells," was granted on November 10, 2020. These cells will have significant advantages over today's silicon-based PVs because, 1) based upon their atomic characteristics, they have a theoretical efficiency of approximately 50%, three time that of today's silicon cells, 2) they will be produced using inexpensive, readily available, nontoxic materials, and 3) unlike silicon, they will be flexible, similar to a sheet of aluminum foil, making their application to irregular surfaces, much easier. These graphene cells will vastly improve the economics for large-scale solar installations, which using molten salt and other types of energy storage, now have the ability to produce utility level electric power day and night. The cells can also be used in numerous smaller scale installations, thereby creating a solution for producing lower cost electricity on a worldwide basis. In summary, this advanced technology has the capability to completely revolutionize the widespread use of renewable energy for the benefit of mankind. Dr. Gruen was interviewed over 2 days in 2024 by filmmaker Jim Toth and the Downers Grove Historical Society who produced a film "Change: A Warming Warning", the film was premiered at the historic Tivoli Theater in Downers Grove om April 30, 2025. Dr. Gruen (age 102) was in attendance and warmly greeted by the audience.

== Personal life ==
Gruen's wife Dolores, a psychologist who received her Ph.D. from the University of Chicago, died on March 19, 2015, at the age of 90 and after 66 years of marriage. Gruen turned 100 in November 2022.

=== Memberships ===
Gruen was a visiting scientist at the invitation of Nobel laureate Glenn T. Seaborg at the Lawrence Berkeley Laboratory, a delegate to the United Nations Conference on Peaceful Uses of Atomic Energy, and a visiting professor at both the Norwegian Technical University and the Hebrew University. He was on the board of the Seaborg Institute for Transactinium Science and on visiting committees for the Lawrence Livermore Laboratory. He has been on the editorial boards of the Annual Review of Materials Science, the Journal of Applied Physics, and Applied Physics Letters. Gruen is a frequently invited lecturer at national and international conferences and has been the organizer of numerous conferences and symposia. Gruen is the author or co- author of more than 350 publications and editor of several books and monographs. He holds approximately 30 U.S. patents. Among those that have been licensed are some in the nanocrystalline diamond film area and one concerning the use of intense ultraviolet laser radiation for the ablation of biological tissue. The process is used worldwide for the treatment of certain cardiovascular diseases.
