= Shubert Spero =

American rabbi (born 1923)

- Born: September 23, 1923; New York City, United States
- Education: City College of New York; Western Reserve University
- Occupations: Rabbi, author, academic
- Employer: Bar-Ilan University
- Known for: Jewish philosophy, Jewish ethics, writings on the Holocaust

Rabbi Shubert Spero (born September 23, 1923) is an American rabbi and author; he was Professor of Jewish Thought at Bar Ilan University.

== Biography ==
Spero was born in New York City. He studied at Yeshiva Torah Vodaas in Brooklyn, New York. He received his B.S degree at City College of New York and attained an M.A and a PhD in philosophy at Western Reserve University. In 1947 he received smicha (ordination), and in 1950 became rabbi of Young Israel of Cleveland, Ohio.

In 1983 with his wife and family he made aliyah to Israel settling in Jerusalem. Spero served as the Irving Stone Professor of Jewish Thought at Bar Ilan University. He was Rabbi Emeritus of his Cleveland community. He wrote extensively on the subjects of halakha, ethics, the Holocaust, Jewish philosophy and the thought of Rabbi Joseph B. Soloveitchik.

== Works ==
- The Faith of a Jew (1949), Jewish Pocket Books
- Journey Into Light: A Manual for the Mourner (1959)
- Faith in the Night: A Bedside Companion for the Sick (1960)
- God in All Seasons (1967)
- The Significance and Justification of Religious Belief (1971)
- Morality, Halakha, and the Jewish tradition (1983), ISBN 9780870687273
- Studies in Parshiot Hashavua for the Summer Months (1985)
- Holocaust and Return to Zion: a Study in The Jewish Philosophy of History (2000), ISBN 9780881256369
- Aspects of Rabbi Joseph Dov Soloveitchik's Philosophy of Judaism: An Analytic Approach (2009)
- New Perspectives in Theology of Judaism (August 2013), ISBN 9781618112675
- The Story of the Chasam Sofer (1976)
