= Sanda University =

Private college in Shanghai, China

- 上海杉达学院
- Logo of the University
- Other names: Shanghai Sanda College
- Type: Private college
- Established: 6 March 2002; 24 years ago
- Location: Shanghai, China
- Campus: Urban
- Website: sandau.edu.cn

Sanda University
- Simplified Chinese: 上海杉达学院
- Traditional Chinese: 上海杉達學院
- Literal meaning: Shanghai Sanda College
Transcriptions
Standard Mandarin
- Hanyu Pinyin: Shànghǎi Shāndá Xuéyuàn

Sanda University (上海杉达学院), also known as Shanghai Sanda College, is a private undergraduate and vocational college in Shanghai, China. The college was officially established in 2002.
