= Weinrib =

Weinrib is a Yiddish surname. Notable people with the surname include:

- David Weinrib (1924–2016), American sculptor and artist of ceramic art
- Eric Weinrib (born 1972), American filmmaker and TV producer
- Geddy Lee Weinrib (born 1953), known as Geddy Lee, Canadian musician, singer and songwriter, lead vocalist, bassist, and keyboardist for the Canadian rock group Rush
- Lennie Weinrib (1935–2006), also known as Lenny, Leonard and Len Weinrib, American actor, voice actor and writer

== See also ==
- Weinreb
- Weintraub
