= Padma Charana Nayak =

Indian Odia-language writer

Padma Charan Nayak (born 30 January 1926) is an Indian Gandhian, columnist and anti-liquor activist.

Nayak was born on 30 January 1926 in Barakula village of Kedrapada District in the state of Odisha, India. His parents were Sri Jogendra Naik and Smt Malati Naik. He studied chemistry and graduated from Ravenshaw College (now Ravenshaw University) with a master's degree. He was a communist party political worker, and he served as Journalist in Soviet Information Department. He left the Communist Party and was elected to the Rajnagar assembly constituency as an independent candidate in 1961. He joined Praja Socialist Party in April 1965. He leads the anti-liquor advocacy group Milita Odisha Nisha Nibarana Abhijan (MONNA). Nayak turned 100 years old in 2026.
