= Ram Nath Sharma =

Judge at Allahabad High Court
- In office ? – 1966 (retired)

Personal details
- Born: 5 November 1904 United Provinces of Agra and Oudh, British India
- Died: 1 December 2015 (aged 111) Gurgaon, Haryana, India
- Education: University of Lucknow

Ram Nath Sharma (5 November 1904 – 1 December 2015) was an Indian judge and supercentenarian who served on the Allahabad High Court.

== Life ==
Born to a poor family in the United Provinces of Agra and Oudh, British India, Sharma took a B.A. from Lucknow University in 1925, followed by an M.A. with honours. He was awarded a Victoria gold medal from the university for his knowledge of Sanskrit. In 1931, he joined the Indian Judicial Service as a munsif, eventually becoming a judge on the Allahabad High Court. He took part in the Indian freedom movement alongside Mahatma Gandhi, Subhash Chandra Bose and Jawahar Lal Nehru. He retired from the High Court in 1966.

His son Ramendra was a rear admiral in the Indian Navy. Justice Sharma moved to Gurgaon in 2005, where he died a month after his 111th birthday. He was believed to be the oldest pensioner in Uttar Pradesh at the time of his death.
