= Zhu Yingfu =

Chinese naval engineer

- 朱英富
- Born: July 12, 1941 (age 85); Shanghai, China
- Education: Shanghai Jiao Tong University
- Scientific career
- Fields: Shipbuilding
- Workplaces: China Shipbuilding Industry Corporation

Zhu Yingfu (Chinese: 朱英富; pinyin: Zhū Yīngfù; born 12 July 1941) is a Chinese engineer and general designer of the Type 052B destroyer, Type 052C destroyer and Chinese aircraft carrier Liaoning.

== Early life ==
On July 12, 1941, Zhu was born in Shanghai, China. Zhu's ancestral home is in Ningbo, Zhejiang.

== Education ==
In 1963, Zhu earned a bachelor's degree in Naval Architectures from Shanghai Jiao Tong University (SJTU). In 1966, Zhu earned a master's degree from SJTU.

== Career ==
Zhu started his engineering career at 701st Research Institute. In 1982, Zhu became a visiting scholar in at University of California, Berkeley, where he researched in the area of ship hydrodynamics. In 2011, Zhu was elected an academician of the Chinese Academy of Engineering (CAE). On September 25, 2012, Zhu became general designer of Chinese aircraft carrier Liaoning. By 2018, Zhu is a chief designer of Liaoning.

== Awards ==
- First Prize of the National Science and Technology Progress Award
- Second Prize of the National Science and Technology Progress Award
- Science and Technology Award of the Ho Leung Ho Lee Foundation

== See also ==
- Chen Bingde
- Liu Zhe, Captain of Liaoning.
