= Xu Qinan =

Chinese engineer and designer

- 徐芑南
- Born: March 4, 1936 (age 90); Shanghai, China
- Education: Shanghai Jiao Tong University
- Spouse: Fang Zhifen
- Scientific career
- Fields: Submersible
- Workplaces: China Shipbuilding Industry Corporation

Xu Qinan (Chinese: 徐芑南; pinyin: Xú Qǐnán; born 4 March 1936) is a Chinese engineer and general designer of deep-sea research submersible Jiaolong. He is an academician of the Chinese Academy of Engineering (CAE).

== Biography ==
Xu was born in Shanghai, on March 4, 1936, while his ancestral home is in Zhenhai District of Ningbo, Zhejiang. After graduating from Shanghai Jiao Tong University in 1958, he was assigned to the China Shipbuilding Industry Corporation.

He was elected an academician of the Chinese Academy of Engineering on December 19, 2013.

== Personal life ==
Xu married Fang Zhifen (Chinese: 方之芬), their children and grandchildren live in the United States.

== Awards ==
- First Prize of the National Science and Technology Progress Award
- Second Prize of the National Science and Technology Progress Award
- Science and Technology Award of the Ho Leung Ho Lee Foundation
