= Olusola Ajolore =

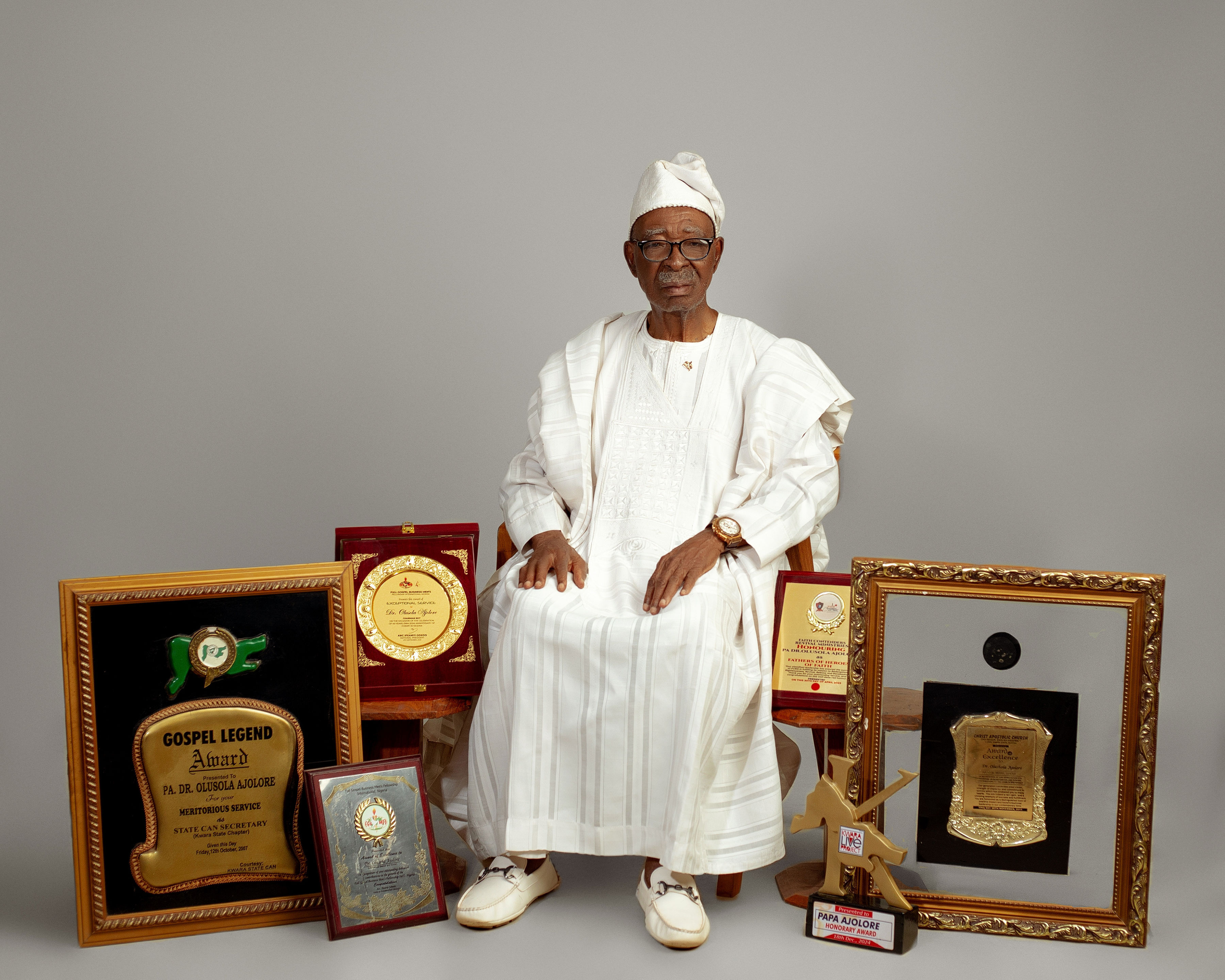
- Born: Kogi State
- Citizenship: Nigeria
- Education: University of Ibadan, University of Illinois
- Occupations: Farmer, Academic
- Spouse: Esther Bamidele Ajolore (married 1962–1996)
- Children: 5

Olusola Ajolore (born 24 July 1926) is a Nigerian centenarian academic, Christian leader, and farmer. He was a lecturer at the University of Lagos who has held leadership positions in the Christian Association of Nigeria (CAN) in Kwara State and the Full Gospel Business Men's Fellowship International (FGBMFI) in Nigeria.

== Early life and education ==
Olusola Ajolore was born to Ajolore and Naomi Ajolore in Mopa, Kogi State, Nigeria. He studied at Baptist Central School, Mopa in 1937. In 1944, he went to Sudan Interior Mission to complete his primary education. He studied English in the University of Ibadan, furthered his study at the University of Manchester and then got a PhD in psycholinguistics from the University of Illinois.

== Academic career ==
Following his return to Nigeria, Olusola resumed his academic career and became a lecturer at the University of Lagos in 1968. He was associated with the former Kwara State College of Technology as a former council chairman and sole administrator from October to December 1983.

== Family ==
He was married to Esther Bamidele Ajolore, who passed away in 1996. They have five children.

== Christian leadership ==
Olusola was involved in the development of the Christian Association of Nigeria in Kwara State. He subsequently served as secretary of the Kwara State chapter of CAN.

In the Ilorin Chapter of the Full Gospel Business Men's Fellowship International, He has served as the Chapter president, field representative, national director and now the chairman of the fellowship's board of trustees.
