= Leon Weintraub =

Polish-born Swedish physician (born 1926)

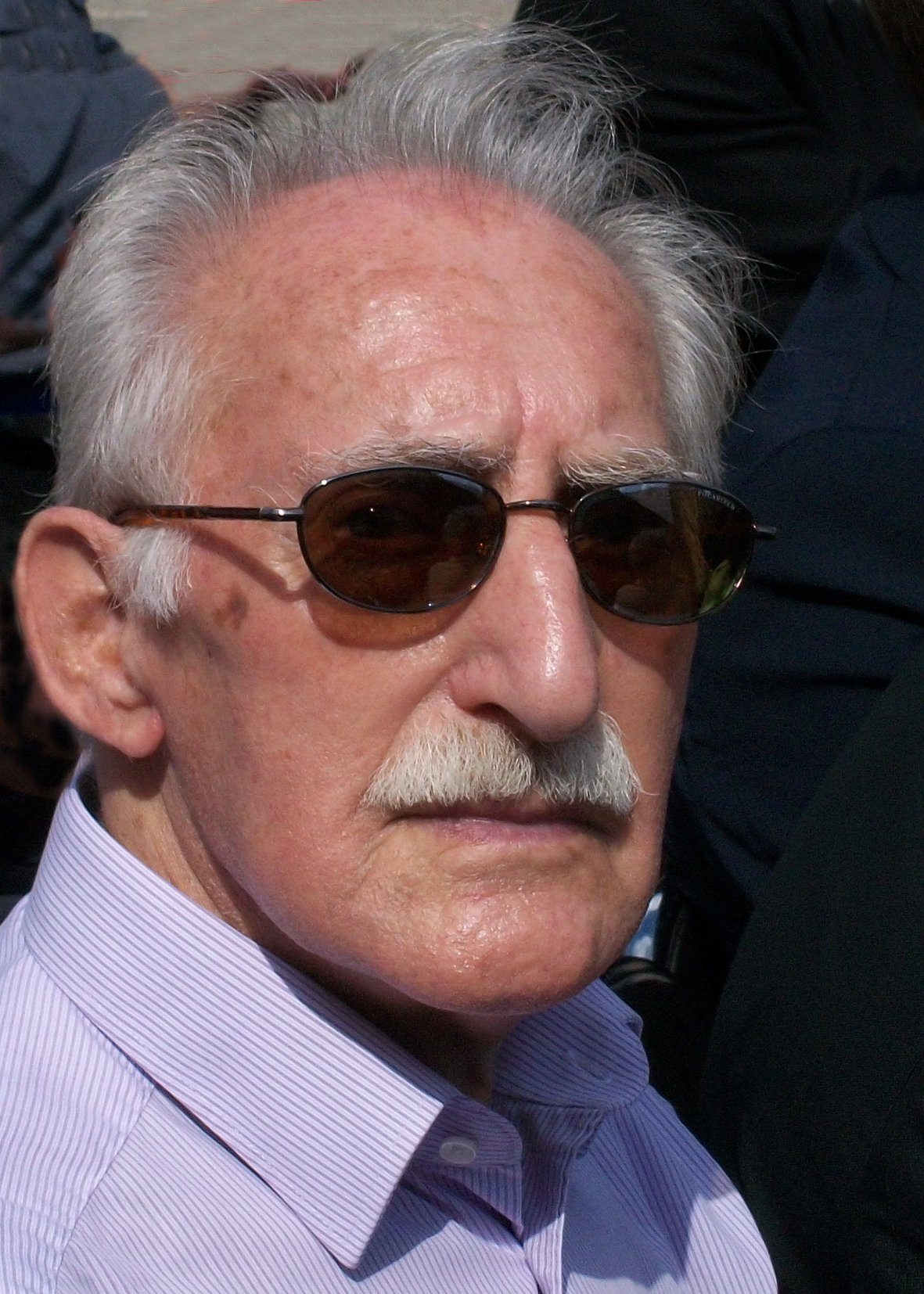
- Born: 1 January 1926 (age 100); Łódź, Poland
- Occupation: Physician
- Known for: Holocaust survivor and Holocaust remembrance activist

Leon Weintraub (born 1 January 1926) is a Polish-born Swedish physician. He is a survivor of the Holocaust in Poland and gives lectures on the Holocaust in Poland and Germany.

== Early life ==
Leon Weintraub was born in Łódź, Poland on 1 January 1926, as the fifth child to a Jewish family. His father died in 1927. Therefore, his mother had to raise him and the four sisters in poverty and under difficult conditions. At the age of 13 Leon witnessed the invasion of the German Wehrmacht and the German occupation of Poland. In 1940, the whole family was detained and forced to live in the Łódź Ghetto.

== Life in the Second World War ==
In order to survive the boy had to work in a galvanization factory which produced for the German Reich. After the invaders were defeated at the Battle of Stalingrad in February 1943, liquidations and deportations began in the ghetto. First the family tried to hide themselves, but they were detected and deported to Auschwitz concentration camp in 1944. Leon was separated from his mother and his sisters, and seemed to face certain death in the gas chamber. He escaped by joining an outgoing transport of inmates to Gross-Rosen concentration camp where he was forced to work as an electrician. In February 1944 he was transferred to Flossenbürg, in March to Natzweiler-Struthof. As the French army approached, the SS guards decided to deport the inmates once again. When the deportation train got bombed by a warplane near Hintschingen, Weintraub escaped along with other inmates. After an all-night walk, the group reached Donaueschingen on April 23, 1945, two days after the French had occupied the city. At that point his weight was down to 35 kilos and he suffered from typhus. Three of his sisters barely survived their last stay at Bergen-Belsen concentration camp.

== Post-war life ==
After the Nazi regime ceased to exist and after his recovery, Weintraub began to study medicine at the University of Göttingen. There he also married his German wife Katja Hof. The couple had a son in 1948. In 1950 he started to work in a clinic for gynecology in Warsaw. In 1951 his spouse and their son relocated to Poland. Weintraub completed his doctorate in 1966, but in 1969 he lost his post as a senior physician at a clinic in Otwock due to rising anti-Semitism in Poland. Thereafter the family emigrated to Sweden. His wife Katja Weintraub, who translated works by Janusz Korczak from Polish into German, died in Stockholm in 1970.

Weintraub serves as a witness and oral historian of the Holocaust, giving lectures in Germany and Poland, mainly to scholars and students, as well as appearing in television documentaries and discussions. On the 80th anniversary of the liberation of Auschwitz, Weintraub was one of the key speakers.

== Quote ==
Two words, so he says, have been canceled from his vocabularies: In his presence none of his family members will ever pronounce the word ″hated", because this term has caused so much damage. The same applies to the word ″revenge″. You simply cannot give back as you were given.

— Leon Weintraub, Quote from Bayerisches Fernsehen, Gegen das Vergessen [Lest we forget], 23 November 2014

== Decoration ==
- 2004 Order of Merit of the Federal Republic of Germany
- 2026 Göttinger Friedenspreis
