= Hélène Guisan-Démétriadès =

Swiss writer (born 1916)

Hélène Guisan-Démétriadès (née Démétriadès, born 16 November 1916) is a Swiss Vaud writer, poet and teacher.

She was born in Istanbul, Ottoman Empire on 16 November 1916, and came to Switzerland at the age of six. After studying literature and years of teaching Ancient Greek, she married the Vaud councilor Louis Guisan.

She translated Greek tragedies into French and wrote many articles of spiritual reflection. She is also the author of La Tierce présence, a work which was awarded the Prix Ève Delacroix of the Académie Française in 1995.

As of November 2019, Guisan lives in Lausanne.

== Sources ==
- in the Cantonal and University Library of Lausanne
- Back page of Les Carnets du silence (2002)
- A D S - Autorinnen und Autoren der Schweiz - Autrices et Auteurs de Suisse - Autrici ed Autori della Svizzera
