= Richard T. Spooner =

United States Marine and restaurateur

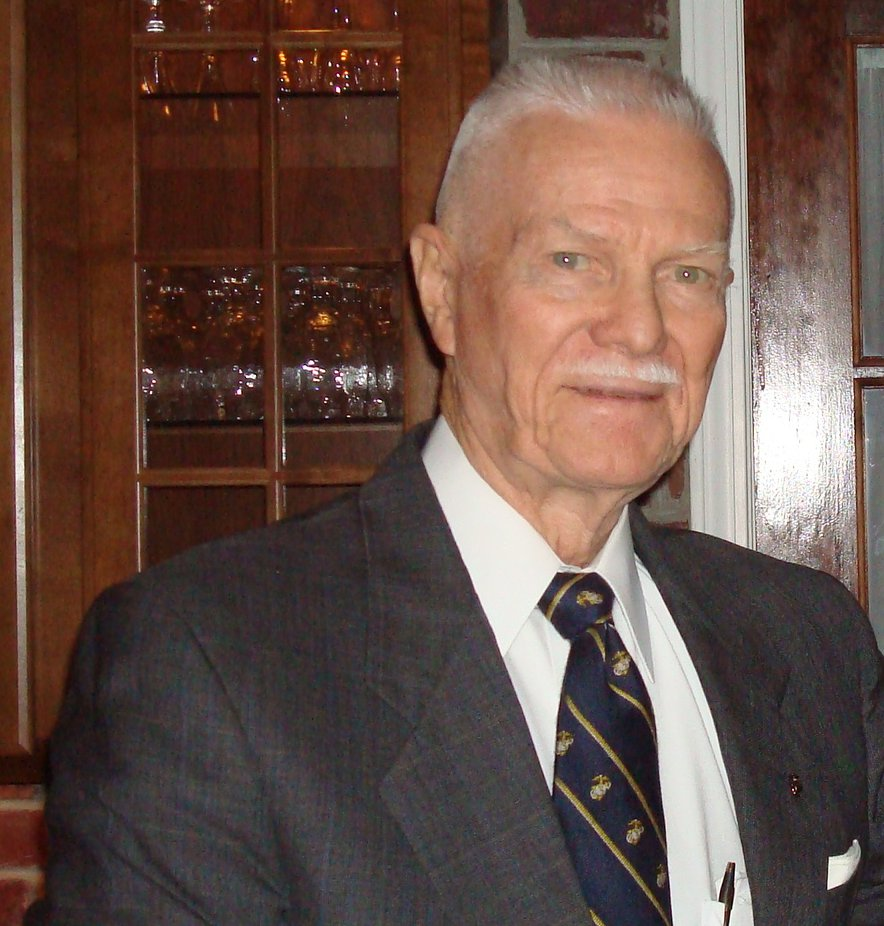
- Rick Spooner at The Globe and Laurel, 2008
- Born: September 10, 1926 (age 100); San Joaquin, California, U.S.
- Military career
- Allegiance: United States of America
- Branch: United States Marine Corps
- Service years: 1942–1972
- Rank: Major
- Nickname: Rick
- Units: 2nd Battalion, 8th Marines; 1st Marine Aircraft Wing
- Conflicts: World War II: Battle of Saipan; Battle of Tinian; Battle of Okinawa; Korean War Vietnam War

Richard Treat Spooner (born 10 September 1926) is a former officer in the United States Marine Corps and founder and former proprietor of The Globe and Laurel Restaurant in Stafford, Virginia, just a few miles south of the main gate of Marine Corps Base Quantico. He served in the Marine Corps for over 29 years.

== Military service ==
Richard Spooner was living in Northern California when World War II broke out; he subsequently enlisted in the Marines at age 17 as a rifleman. Spooner participated in several operations during the war, including the Battle of Saipan, where he was briefly taken prisoner by the Imperial Japanese Army. He also fought in the Battle of Okinawa. After the war, he was promoted to gunnery sergeant and eventually commissioned as a second lieutenant. During the Korean War, Spooner served in with the 1st Marine Aircraft Wing and also taught infantry tactics at Camp Pendleton. During his subsequent career, he commanded five companies and the Marine detachment aboard a heavy cruiser. By the time the Vietnam War broke out, Spooner had achieved the rank of major. During the war, he served in the Provost Marshal Division and as an adviser to the South Vietnamese police. Spooner received a medical discharge and retired from the Marine Corps in 1972.

== Published works ==
Spooner has written four books, the first in 2004 being The Spirit of Semper Fidelis, a historical novel about the Pacific War which is actually a personal memoir. He wrote the book after a conversation with several Marine captains who were unaware that the Marine Corps had fought on Saipan during World War II. His second book, A Marine Anthology, was published in 2011 by Phillips Publications. "A Marine Anthology" is a collection of stories and tales about the "Old Corps", ranging from the Boxer Rebellion to the Battle of Saipan. His third book, The Dragon of Destiny & The Saga of Shanghai Pooley, is set in the 1930s. The fourth book, the Brigadier and the Baroness, released in 2022, is the tale of a character of old Marine Corps lore, a Marine gunnery sergeant named "Brigadier" whose serendipitous adventures follow late 19th century-to-World War I Marine Corps battles, from the Spanish–American War to the birth of the famous 5th Marines.

== The Globe and Laurel ==
In 1968, Richard Spooner opened the Globe and Laurel Restaurant, which he described as "a pub for professional Marines". The pub features a collection of military memorabilia, including an original Medal of Honor and Victoria Cross. When he retired from the Marine Corps, his wife Gloria helped convince him to turn it from a part-time hobby into a full-time job. The Globe and Laurel was originally located on Broadway Street in the town of Quantico, but in 1973 a fire gutted the original building. The Globe and Laurel subsequently reopened in the town of Triangle, just outside the main gate of Marine Corps Base Quantico where it resided for 35 years. The Spooners and "The Globe and Laurel" have been featured on "War Stories" on the History Channel and the Food Network. Due to a road widening project, the Globe and Laurel location in Triangle was closed and destroyed in May 2008, and a new location re-opened in Stafford, Virginia in 2009. Spooner continued to serve as proprietor of the Globe and Laurel until he retired in mid-2020.
