= Johanna Quaas =

German gymnast (born 1925)

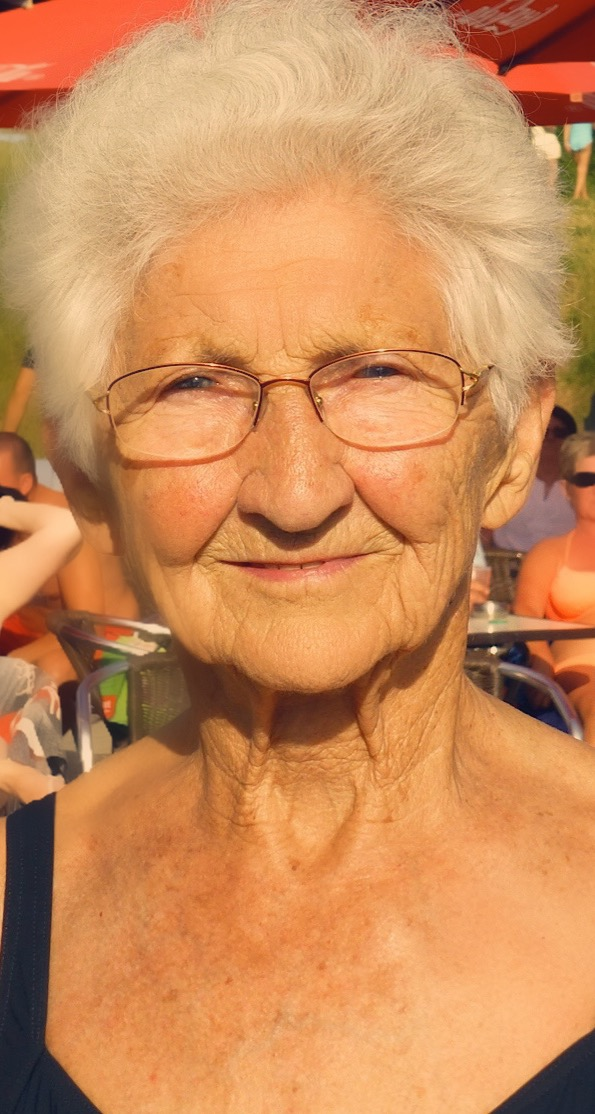
- Quaas in 2017

Personal information
- Alternative names: Johanna Geißler, Johanna Geißler-Quaas
- Nicknames: "Hannchen", "Turn-Oma" ("Gymnastics Grandma")
- Born: 20 November 1925 (age 100) Hohenmölsen, Saxony-Anhalt, Weimar Republic
- Spouse: Gerhard Quaas (gymnastics coach, 1963-2016)

Gymnastics career
- Discipline: Women's artistic gymnastics
- Country represented: Germany
- Club: SV Halle (Sportverein Halle)

Johanna Quaas (IPA: [joˈhana ˈkvaːs]; née Geißler IPA: [ˈgaɪsˌlɐ]; born 20 November 1925) is a German gymnast who, on 12 April 2012, was certified by Guinness World Records as the world's oldest active competitive gymnast. At the age of 86 when breaking the record, Quaas was a regular competitor in the amateur competition Landes-Seniorenspiele (State Senior Games) in Saxony. She became known worldwide when on 26 March 2012, YouTube user LieveDaffy uploaded two videos of Quaas performing gymnastics routines: one on the parallel bars and one on the floor. The clips became viral videos, and within six days of posting had generated over 1.1 million views each. In addition to being recognised by Guinness World Records, Quaas has received the Nadia Comăneci Sportsmanship Award from the International Gymnastics Hall of Fame.

== Viral videos ==
Quaas became known worldwide when on 26 March 2012, YouTube user LieveDaffy (Note: As of November 2022, the username is Daphne van Roij.) uploaded two videos of the 86-year-old training during the Tournament of Masters in Cottbus, one on the parallel bars and one of a floor exercise routine. The clips became viral videos, and within six days of posting had generated over 1.1 million views each. German and international newspapers and TV stations reported on Quaas, and she was invited to appear on the German TV show Gottschalk Live. Her story also was covered in at least 188 Chinese newspapers. As of November 2022, the parallel bars video had received over 3.7 million views, and the floor video over 3.8 million views.

== Early life and education ==
Johanna Geißler was born 20 November 1925, in Hohenmölsen, Germany. She was an active child and often would climb tall bars and roll on the mats. She began gymnastics at an early age, first competing at about age ten, but soon her family moved to a different part of Germany, temporarily ending her participation in competitions. When she was eleven, she began Nazi Germany's required social service work for girls during World War II during which she worked in farming and took care of the children of another family. (Note: See Women in Nazi Germany.)

After completing the compulsory social service, she trained as a gymnastics coach in Stuttgart, finishing in 1945 and moving to Weißenfels. She was unable to work in gymnastics at that time, however, because it had been banned in East Germany during the first two years of post-World War II Allied occupation. Instead, she took up team handball while in Weißenfels, learning and practicing it until the ban on gymnastics was removed in 1947. In 1950, she studied at the University of Halle to become a sports teacher.

== Career ==
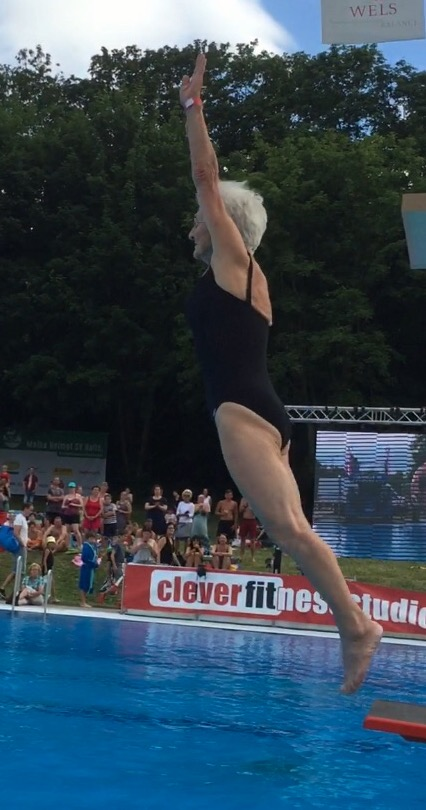
Quaas jumping into a pool, 24 June 2017

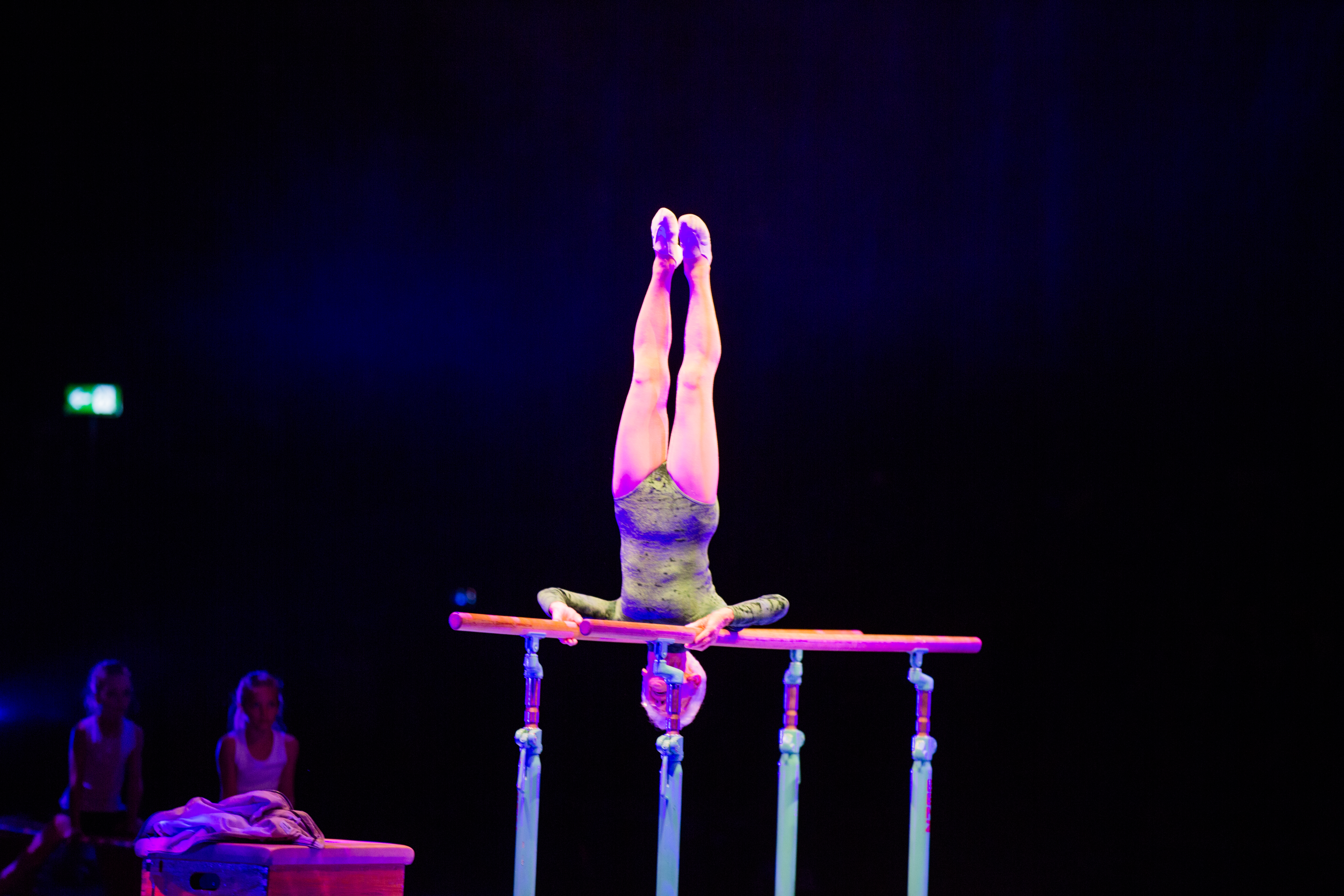
Quaas in 2017

After passing the teaching exam in 1950, she became employed at the Institut für Körpererziehung (Institute for Physical Education) where she trained sports teachers and co-authored the university textbook Gerätturnen (Apparatus Gymnastics). That same year, she competed as a part of the gymnastics team of HSG Wissenschaft Halle (Note: German: Hochschulsportgemeinschaft Wissenschaft aus Halle; English: University Sports Association Science from Halle) (later called SC Wissenschaft Halle (Note: Sports Club Science Halle)) along with Helga Speck (Buchmann) and Rosemarie Neutsch (Kirsch). Although gymnastics was no longer banned in East Germany, Quaas continued to play handball as well and was a member of the team that won the Eastern German Championship in 1954.

Quaas turned her attention to coaching youth girls' gymnastics and, with trainer Siegfried Bräutigam, led the team to become German Youth Champions in 1957. Then, in 1961, she began training gymnasts at SV Halle (Sportverein Halle) (then called SC Chemie Halle). (Note: German: Sportclub Chemie Halle; English: Sports Club Chemistry Halle) Her gymnasts included Barbara Dix-Stolz and Christel Felgner-Wunder, who finished fourth place in the 1964 Summer Olympics in Tokyo.

In 1981, at age 56, Quaas returned to active gymnastics in a "manner suitable for senior citizens" and began competing in the German gymnastics festivals Senior group. It was at the Harzer Bergturnfest (Harz Mountain Gymnastics Festival) in Blankenburg where she resumed competing in 1982. The next year, she won the GDR Gymnastics and Sports Festival for the first time in Leipzig.

In 2000, the German Gymnastics Association reopened championships for senior athletes, and at the German Gymnastics Festival, she has won the title of German Senior Gymnastics Champion eleven times in a row in the 21st century.

At age eighty, Quaas was an active competitor and trainer at SV Halle. In 2011, she ended her participation in national championships, and in 2012, she was still a regular competitor in the amateur Landes-Seniorenspiele (State Senior Games) in Saxony. Additionally, on 2 November 2013, at the 28th Cottbuser Turn-Memorial (Cottbus Gymnastics Memorial), she won what she then said was her last gymnastics competition. According to senior gymnast Helmut Wetzel, the purpose of the Memorial is to "'commemorate those who are no longer there and honor those who keep themselves fit and capable of everyday life through gymnastics on the apparatus until old age'".

In June 2016, she again announced that she would compete one final time that August at the traditional Jahnturnfest (Jahn Gymnastics Festival) in Freyburg. She continued to start on the floor exercises, bench, parallel bars, and high bar. Although not during a competition, in April 2017, she performed a parallel bars routine on a men's Olympic set at the 8th International Ageing Asia Innovation Forum in Singapore.

After a torn biceps tendon in 2018, she stopped performing active or competitive gymnastics, but she could still stand on her head at age 95. She has developed a bed gymnastics routine which she performs every morning and has made the routine available on YouTube and DVD published by Wissner-Bosserhoff. She had planned to participate in the 98th Jahnturnfest in August 2021 using a bicycle, but on Whitsun of that year, while taking a recreational bicycle ride in her original hometown of Hohenmölsen, she crashed and suffered a femoral neck fracture for which she required surgery.

=== Awards and recognition ===
On 12 April 2012, Quaas received an entry in the Guinness World Records as the world's oldest active competitive gymnast. She was invited by the International Gymnastics Training Camp and the American Turners New York to perform her bars routine on the latter's float in the 57th German-American Steuben Parade on 20 September 2014. The parade procession lasted an hour, and Quaas performed her routine six times while on the float.

On 16 May 2015, she was awarded the Nadia Comăneci Sportsmanship Award from the International Gymnastics Hall of Fame. Quaas was recognized on Steve Harvey's television show Little Big Shots: Forever Young during the episode that aired 5 July 2017 where she performed her parallel bars routine. Unbeknownst to Quaas, Olympic gold medalist Simone Biles watched from backstage, and after Quaas completed her routine, Harvey surprised her by bringing Biles onstage to honor her. Biles said that Quaas' performance left her "speechless".

=== Quotes ===
Quaas has several quotes attributed to her, including, "If you are fit, it is easier to master life", "When there is movement, there is life", "My face is old but my heart is young", and "Maybe the day I stop doing gymnastics is the day I die".

== Personal life ==
Johanna Geißler married gymnast coach Gerhard Quaas in 1963. Also a gymnastics trainer at SC Chemie Halle, he was several years her junior, born in 1933, and he died in 2016 at the age of 83. With Gerhard, she has three daughters, along with four grandchildren, a great-granddaughter, and a second great-grandchild born in 2017. Quaas resides in Halle (Saale). Her personal nickname is "Hannchen", and she has been nicknamed "Turn-Oma" ("Gymnastics Grandma") by the press.

In 2016 at the age of ninety, she fulfilled a life's dream by skydiving from a height of about 3,000 meters (9,800 feet). She dedicated the jump to Queen Elizabeth II who also was ninety during that year. Quaas was quoted as saying, "Ich achte ihre Lebensleistung und verehre sie sehr", in English, "I respect her life's work and adore her very much". Quaas' tandem jumping partner was Olympic gymnastics medalist Eberhard Gienger.

Quaas has experienced several injuries unrelated to gymnastics. She had a bike fall in the spring of 2014 that left her temporarily unable to use gym equipment. At that time, she also reported that she was having some problems with a shoulder caused by a torn tendon, but the cause of the tear was not given. She has osteoarthritis in her left knee, and while performing a task unrelated to sports, she experienced a tendon tear in her left biceps in early November 2018, which kept her from participating in gymnastics at the 2018 Blume Festival Gran Canaria and in device gymnastics at the 97th Jahnturnfest in 2019. As reported by GYMmedia, with quotes from Quaas:

Für ihre Enkelin wollte sie einfach nur einen Babystuhl verstellen, aber der "Nippel wollte einfach nicht durch die Lasche" – ein Ruck und Zack – ein heftiger Schmerz im linken Arm führte zu o. g. Diagnose!

"Das tat natürlich weh", so die immer noch aktive Seniorensportlerin, "aber komischer Weise kann ich jetzt den Arm wesentlich besser heben, als vorher, und da meinte die Ärztin, wir lassen das jetzt erst mal so!"

In English:

She just wanted to adjust a baby chair for her granddaughter, but the "nipple just wouldn't go through the flap" – a jerk and jerk – a severe pain in her left arm led to the above diagnosis!

"That hurt, of course," said the still active senior athlete, "but strangely enough, I can now raise my arm a lot better than before, and the doctor said, let's leave it that way for now!"
