= James Clayton Flowers =

American Tuskegee Airman (born 1915)

First Lieutenant James Clayton Flowers
- Born: December 25, 1915 (age 110 years, 329 days); Surry County, Virginia, U.S.
- Spouse: Evelyn Lorraine Flowers (m. 1951; died 2008)
- Military career
- Allegiance: United States of America
- Branch: United States Army Air Force
- Service years: 1940–1945
- Rank: First Lieutenant
- Units: 99th Fighter Squadron; 332nd Fighter Group
- Known for: Oldest living American man (since October 4, 2026)
- Awards: Congressional Gold Medal awarded to the Tuskegee Airmen
- Other work: Teacher in New York City

James Clayton Flowers (born December 25, 1915) is a former American military officer and supercentenarian who served with the Tuskegee Airmen during World War II. He is also, since October 4, 2026, the oldest validated living man in the United States.

== Life and military service ==
James Clayton Flowers was born on December 25, 1915 in Surry County, Virginia.

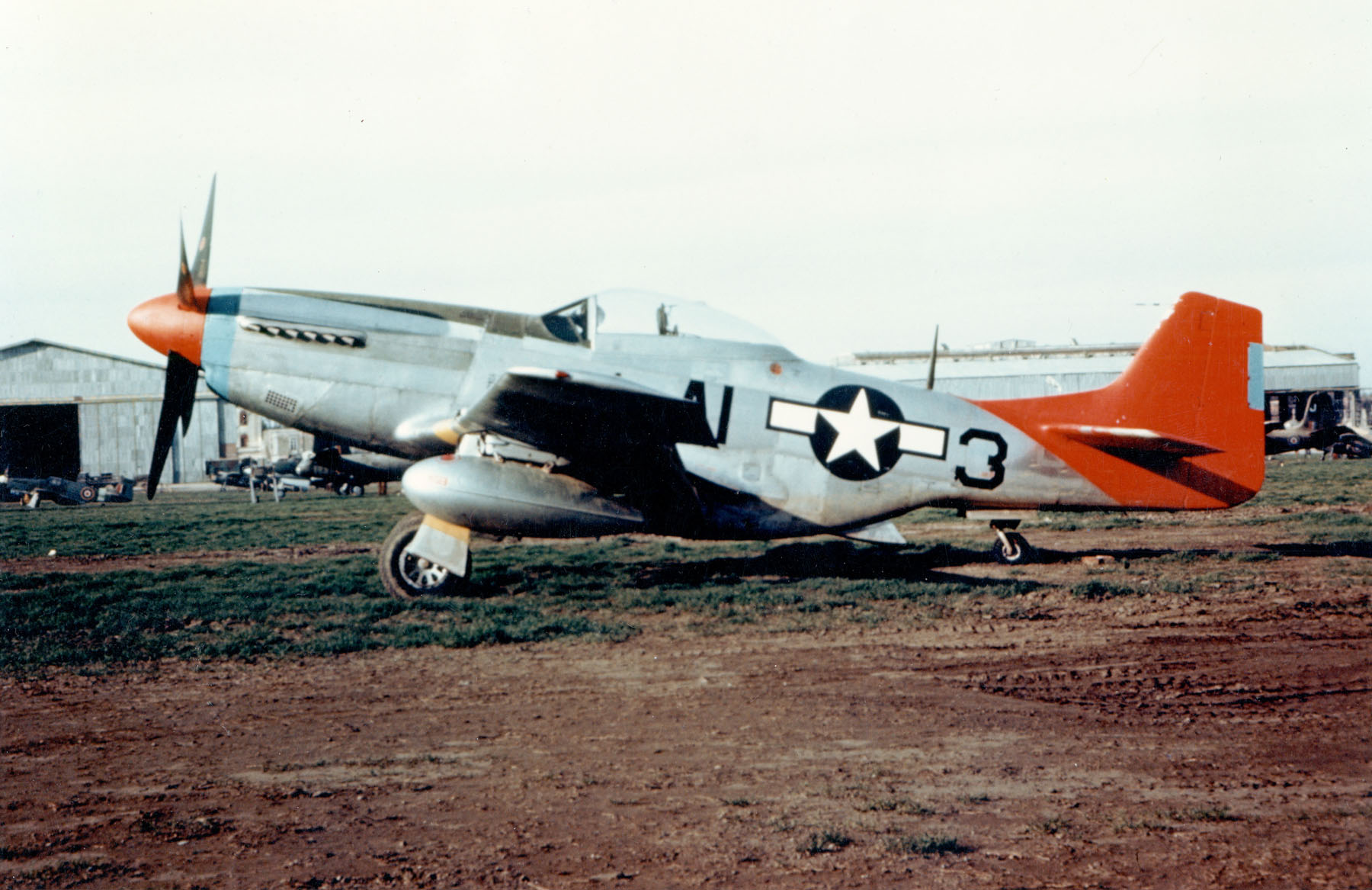
The Tuskegee Airmen's aircraft had distinctive markings that led to the name, "Red Tails." (Note: The red markings that distinguished the Tuskegee Airmen included red bands on the noses of P-51s as well as a red rudder; their P-51B and D Mustangs flew with similar color schemes, with red propeller spinners, yellow wing bands and all-red tail surfaces.)

He was initially an aviation cadet training to become a pilot at Tuskegee Institute. In his own words, "I washed out of flying, so then they sent me to the OCS, Officer Candidate School." Flowers recounted "I was in five years. Most of the time I was teaching at the cadet ground school." Flowers later served as an intelligence officer (S2) at Freeman Field, Indiana, with the 477th Bombardment Group. Because the 477th later became known as part of the Tuskegee Airmen when the term was later coined by Charles Francis when he wrote his 1955 book with that title, Flowers is sometimes confused with the better known 99th Fighter Squadron, and sometimes confused as a fighter pilot rather than a support instructor or intelligence officer. In contrast, the 477th Bombardment Group flew B-25 Mitchell medium bombers, and did not deploy to combat like the 99th Fighter Squadron, and instead was slated for combat in the Pacific Theater.

Flowers married his wife Evelyn in 1951 and the couple had two children. He worked as a mathematics schoolteacher in Manhattan and after retirement, he and his wife relocated to New Mexico. New Mexico held a ceremony to honour the Tuskegee Airmen in March 2014. Flowers was present for the dedication at the New Mexico Veterans' Memorial. He turned 100 on December 25, 2015, and 110 on December 25, 2025. He is currently the oldest known living man in the United States, since the death of 110-year-old Major Jewel McDonald of Mississippi.

Flowers was a member of the Community Church of New York before moving to New Mexico. He has been a member of the Unitarian Universalist Church of Las Cruces, New Mexico, for over forty years.

== Awards ==
- The Congressional Gold Medal was awarded to the Tuskegee Airmen in 2006

== See also ==
- Executive Order 9981
- List of Tuskegee Airmen
- Military history of African Americans
- The Tuskegee Airmen (movie)
