= February 11 =

February 11 this year in various calendars
- Wednesday, 11 February 2026
Akan	Nwonawukuo
Armenian	26 Mehekani 1475
Aztec	Etzalcualiztli 12, 7 Xōchitl
Babylonian	22 Tebetu, 2336 SE
Balinese pawukon	Luang, Pepet, Beteng, Menala, Wage, Aryang, Buda of Menail, Yama, Jangur, Pati
Bengali	28 Magh, BS 1432
Chinese	Yang Fire Dragon・Winnowing Basket Mansion; Wood Snake Year, Month 12, Day 24 (Lichun, 7 days until Yushui)
Common Era	11 February 2026 CE
Coptic	4 Meshir, AM 1742
Egyptian	1 Epiphi, 2774 NE
Ethiopian	4 Yakātit, 2018 Amätä Məhrät
French Republican	Décade III, Tridi de Pluviôse de l'Année 234 de la République
Gregorian	11 February, AD 2026
Hebrew	24 Shevat, AM 5786
Hindu	Anurādhā・Dhruva; Solar: 29 Māgha, 1947 SE; Lunisolar: Navamī, Kṛishna pakṣa of Māgha, 2082 VE; Siddhārthin・5126 KY・1,872,617
Icelandic	Miðvikudagur, 20 Þorri 2025
Islamic	23 Sha'aban, AH 1447 (using tabular method)
ISO week date	2026-W07-3
Japanese	24 Shiwasu, Reiwa 8 (Risshun, 8 days until Usui)
Julian	29 January, AD 2026 (AM 7534)
Julian day	2461083
Korean	24 Sodal, 4358 DE
Maya	13.0.13.6.0; 18 Pax, 7 Ahau
Roman	ante diem IV Kalendas Februarias, MMDCCLXXIX AUC
Solar Hijri	22 Bahman, SH 1404
Tibetan	25 rgyal, shing mo sbrul 2152 or 1771 or 999

<<	February					>>
Su	Mo	Tu	We	Th	Fr	Sa
1	2	3	4	5	6	7
8	9	10	11	12	13	14
15	16	17	18	19	20	21
22	23	24	25	26	27	28
2026

February 11 in recent years
2026 (Wednesday)
2025 (Tuesday)
2024 (Sunday)
2023 (Saturday)
2022 (Friday)
2021 (Thursday)
2020 (Tuesday)
2019 (Monday)
2018 (Sunday)
2017 (Saturday)

February 11 is the 42nd day of the year in the Gregorian calendar; 323 days remain until the end of the year (324 in leap years).

== Events ==
=== Pre-1600 ===
- 660 BCE – Traditional date for the foundation of Japan by Emperor Jimmu.
- 55 – The death under mysterious circumstances of Tiberius Claudius Caesar Britannicus, heir to the Roman Empire, on the eve of his coming of age clears the way for Nero to become Emperor.
- 951 – Guo Wei, a court official, leads a military coup and declares himself emperor of the new Later Zhou.
- 1144 – Robert of Chester completes his translation from Arabic to Latin of the Liber de compositione alchemiae, marking the birth of Western alchemy.
- 1534 – At the Convocation of Canterbury, the Catholic bishops comprising the Upper House of the Province of Canterbury agree to style Henry VIII supreme head of the English church and clergy "so far as the law of Christ allows".
- 1584 – A naval expedition led by Pedro Sarmiento de Gamboa founds Nombre de Jesús, the first of two short-lived Spanish settlements in the Strait of Magellan.
- 1586 – Sir Francis Drake with an English force captures and occupies the Spanish colonial port of Cartagena de Indias for two months, obtaining a ransom and booty.

=== 1601–1900 ===
- 1659 – The assault on Copenhagen by Swedish forces is beaten back with heavy losses.
- 1794 – First session of United States Senate opens to the public.
- 1808 – Jesse Fell burns anthracite on an open grate as an experiment in heating homes with coal.
- 1812 – Massachusetts governor Elbridge Gerry is accused of "gerrymandering" for the first time.
- 1823 – Carnival tragedy of 1823: About 110 boys are killed during a human crush at the Convent of the Minori Osservanti in Valletta, Malta.
- 1826 – University College London is founded as University of London.
- 1829 – Facing backlach of Treaty of Turkmenchay, Alexander Griboyedov, Russian Empire's Ambassador to Tehran, and all the other embassy staff, were massacred by an angry mob.
- 1840 – Gaetano Donizetti's opera La fille du régiment receives its first performance in Paris, France.
- 1843 – Giuseppe Verdi's opera I Lombardi alla prima crociata receives its first performance in Milan, Italy.
- 1855 – Kassa Hailu is crowned Tewodros II, Emperor of Ethiopia.
- 1856 – The Kingdom of Awadh is annexed by the British East India Company and Wajid Ali Shah, the king of Awadh, is deposed.
- 1858 – Bernadette Soubirous's first vision of the Blessed Virgin Mary occurs in Lourdes, France.
- 1861 – American Civil War: The United States House of Representatives unanimously passes a resolution guaranteeing noninterference with slavery in any state.
- 1873 – King Amadeo I of Spain abdicates, triggering the proclamation of the First Spanish Republic.
- 1889 – The Meiji Constitution of Japan is adopted.
- 1893 – White Star Line cargo ship, SS Naronic, departs Liverpool, England bound for New York City with 74 passengers and crew on board. She is never seen again.

=== 1901–present ===
- 1903 – Anton Bruckner's 9th Symphony receives its first performance in Vienna, Austria.
- 1906 – Pope Pius X publishes the encyclical Vehementer Nos.
- 1919 – Friedrich Ebert (SPD) is elected President of Germany.
- 1929 – The Kingdom of Italy and the Vatican sign the Lateran Treaty.
- 1933 – LAPD Red Squad raid on John Reed Club art show in the U.S. results in the destruction of a dozen political artworks.
- 1937 – The Flint sit-down strike ends when General Motors recognizes the United Auto Workers trade union.
- 1938 – BBC Television produces the world's first ever science fiction television programme, an adaptation of a section of the Karel Čapek play R.U.R. that coined the term "robot".
- 1942 – World War II: Second day of the Battle of Bukit Timah is fought in Singapore.
- 1946 – The New Testament of the Revised Standard Version of the Bible, the first significant challenge to the Authorized King James Version, is published.
- 1953 – Cold War: U.S. President Dwight D. Eisenhower denies all appeals for clemency for Julius and Ethel Rosenberg.
- 1953 – Israeli-Soviet relations are severed.
- 1959 – The Federation of Arab Emirates of the South is created as a protectorate of the United Kingdom.
- 1963 – The Beatles record their first album, Please Please Me.
- 1970 – Japan launches Ohsumi, becoming the fourth nation to put an object into orbit using its own booster.
- 1971 – Cold War: The Seabed Arms Control Treaty opens for signature, outlawing nuclear weapons on the ocean floor in international waters.
- 1978 – Pacific Western Airlines Flight 314 crashes at the Cranbrook/Canadian Rockies International Airport in Cranbrook, British Columbia, Canada with 42 deaths and seven survivors.
- 1979 – The Iranian Revolution establishes an Islamic theocracy under the leadership of Ayatollah Ruhollah Khomeini.
- 1990 – Nelson Mandela is released from Victor Verster Prison outside Cape Town, South Africa after 27 years as a political prisoner.
- 1990 – Buster Douglas, a 42:1 underdog, knocks out Mike Tyson in ten rounds at Tokyo to win boxing's world Heavyweight title.
- 1997 – Space Shuttle Discovery is launched on a mission to service the Hubble Space Telescope.
- 1997 – The far-right extremist Hungarian National Front introduces the day of honor, a neo-nazi and neo-fascist annual gathering in Budapest
- 1999 – Pluto crosses Neptune's orbit, ending a nearly 20-year period when it was closer to the Sun than the gas giant; Pluto is not expected to interact with Neptune's orbit again until 2231.
- 2000 – Space Shuttle Endeavour is launched on STS-99 to conduct the Shuttle Radar Topography Mission.
- 2001 – A Dutch programmer launches the Anna Kournikova virus infecting millions of emails via a trick photo of the tennis star.
- 2008 – Rebel East Timorese soldiers seriously wound President José Ramos-Horta. Rebel leader Alfredo Reinado is killed in the attack.
- 2011 – Arab Spring: The first wave of the Egyptian revolution culminates in the resignation of Hosni Mubarak and the transfer of power to the Supreme Military Council after 17 days of protests.
- 2013 – The Vatican confirms that Pope Benedict XVI will resign the papacy as a result of his advanced age.
- 2013 – Militants claiming to be from the Sultanate of Sulu invade Lahad Datu District, Sabah, Malaysia, beginning the Lahad Datu standoff.
- 2014 – A military transport plane crashes in a mountainous area of Oum El Bouaghi Province in eastern Algeria, killing 77 people.
- 2015 – A university student is murdered as she resists an attempted rape in Turkey, sparking nationwide protests and public outcry against harassment and violence against women.
- 2015 – The European Space Agency's Intermediate eXperimental Vehicle is launched on a Vega rocket.
- 2016 – A man shoots seven people dead at an education center in Jizan Province, Saudi Arabia.
- 2017 – North Korea test fires a ballistic missile across the Sea of Japan.
- 2018 – Saratov Airlines Flight 703 crashes near Moscow, Russia with 71 deaths and no survivors.
- 2020 – COVID-19 pandemic: The World Health Organization officially names the coronavirus outbreak as COVID-19, with the virus being designated SARS-CoV-2.
- 2024 – 2024 Finnish presidential election: Alexander Stubb is elected as the 13th president of Finland.

== Births ==
=== Pre-1600 ===
- 1380 – Poggio Bracciolini, Italian scholar and translator (died 1459)
- 1466 – Elizabeth of York, Queen Consort of England (died 1503)
- 1535 – Pope Gregory XIV (died 1591)
- 1568 – Honoré d'Urfé, French author and playwright (died 1625)

=== 1601–1900 ===
- 1624 – Ivan Ančić, Croatian Franciscan and religious writer (died 1685)
- 1649 – William Carstares, Scottish minister and academic (died 1715)
- 1657 – Bernard Le Bovier de Fontenelle, French poet and playwright (died 1757)
- 1708 – Egidio Duni, Italian composer (died 1775)
- 1764 – Marie-Joseph Chénier, French poet and playwright (died 1811)
- 1776 – Ioannis Kapodistrias, Greek politician, 1st Governor of Greece (died 1831)
- 1800 – Henry Fox Talbot, English photographer and politician, invented the calotype (died 1877)
- 1802 – Lydia Maria Child, American journalist, author, and activist (died 1880)
- 1805 – Jean Baptiste Charbonneau, Native American-French Canadian explorer (died 1866)
- 1812 – Alexander H. Stephens, American lawyer and politician, Vice President of the Confederate States of America (died 1883)
- 1813 – Otto Ludwig, German author, playwright, and critic (died 1865)
- 1821 – Auguste Mariette, French archaeologist and scholar (died 1881)
- 1830 – Hans Bronsart von Schellendorff, Prussian pianist and composer (died 1913)
- 1833 – Melville Fuller, American lawyer and jurist, 8th Chief Justice of the United States (died 1910)
- 1839 – Josiah Willard Gibbs, American physicist (died 1903)
- 1845 – Ahmet Tevfik Pasha, Ottoman soldier and politician, Grand Vizier of the Ottoman Empire (died 1936)
- 1847 – Thomas Edison, American engineer and businessman, developed the light bulb and phonograph (died 1931)
- 1855 – Ellen Day Hale, American painter and author (died 1940)
- 1860 – Rachilde, French author and playwright (died 1953)
- 1863 – John F. Fitzgerald, American politician; Mayor of Boston (died 1950)
- 1864 – Louis Bouveault, French chemist (died 1909)
- 1869 – Helene Kröller-Müller, German-Dutch art collector and philanthropist, founded the Kröller-Müller Museum (died 1939)
- 1869 – Else Lasker-Schüler, German poet and author (died 1945)
- 1874 – Elsa Beskow, Swedish author and illustrator (died 1953)
- 1877 – Aasa Helgesen, Norwegian midwife (died 1968)
- 1881 – Carlo Carrà, Italian painter (died 1966)
- 1888 – John Warren Davis, American educator, college administrator, and civil rights leader (died 1980)
- 1896 – Claire Myers Owens, American author (died 1983)
- 1897 – Emil Leon Post, Polish-American mathematician and logician (died 1954)
- 1898 – Leo Szilard, Hungarian-American physicist and academic (died 1964)
- 1900 – Ellen Broe, Danish nurse, pioneer in nursing education (died 1994)
- 1900 – Hans-Georg Gadamer, German philosopher and scholar (died 2002)
- 1900 – Jōsei Toda, Japanese educator and activist (died 1958)

=== 1901–present ===
- 1902 – Arne Jacobsen, Danish architect, designed Radisson Blu Royal Hotel (died 1971)
- 1904 – Keith Holyoake, New Zealand farmer and politician, 26th Prime Minister of New Zealand (died 1983)
- 1904 – Lucile Randon, French supercentenarian (died 2023)
- 1908 – Philip Dunne, American screenwriter (died 1992)
- 1908 – Vivian Fuchs, English explorer (died 1999)
- 1909 – Max Baer, American boxer and actor (died 1959)
- 1909 – Joseph L. Mankiewicz, American director, producer, and screenwriter (died 1993)
- 1912 – Rudolf Firkušný, Czech-American pianist and educator (died 1994)
- 1914 – Matt Dennis, American singer-songwriter and pianist (died 2002)
- 1914 – Josh White, American blues singer-songwriter and guitarist (died 1969)
- 1915 – Patrick Leigh Fermor, English soldier, author, and scholar (died 2011)
- 1915 – Richard Hamming, American mathematician and academic (died 1998)
- 1917 – Sidney Sheldon, American author and screenwriter (died 2007)
- 1919 – Eva Gabor, Hungarian-American actress (died 1995)
- 1920 – Farouk of Egypt (died 1965)
- 1920 – Daniel F. Galouye, American author (died 1976)
- 1920 – Billy Halop, American actor (died 1976)
- 1920 – Daniel James, Jr., American general and pilot (died 1978)
- 1921 – Lloyd Bentsen, American politician, 69th United States Secretary of the Treasury (died 2006)
- 1921 – Ottavio Missoni, Italian hurdler and fashion designer, founded Missoni (died 2013)
- 1923 – Antony Flew, English philosopher and academic (died 2010)
- 1924 – Budge Patty, American tennis player (died 2021)
- 1925 – Virginia E. Johnson, American psychologist and academic (died 2013)
- 1925 – Kim Stanley, American actress (died 2001)
- 1926 – Paul Bocuse, French chef (died 2018)
- 1926 – Leslie Nielsen, Canadian-American actor and producer (died 2010)
- 1930 – Roy De Forest, American painter and academic (died 2007).
- 1930 – Mary Quant, British fashion designer (died 2023) (Note: The Mary Quant exhibition at the Victoria and Albert Museum in 2019–20 stated her year of birth as 1930, and that she became a student at Goldsmiths College around 1950. However, the sleeve to her own autobiography (2012) gives the year as 1934, a date that has been widely cited over the years. Obituaries in April 2023 seemed universally to have accepted that she was 93 when she died: in other words, that she was born on 11 February 1930.)
- 1932 – Dennis Skinner, English miner and politician
- 1934 – Mel Carnahan, American lawyer and politician, 51st Governor of Missouri (died 2000)
- 1934 – Tina Louise, American actress and singer
- 1934 – Manuel Noriega, Panamanian general and politician, Military leader of Panama (died 2017)
- 1934 – David Taylor, English veterinarian and television host (died 2013)
- 1935 – Gene Vincent, American singer and guitarist (died 1971)
- 1936 – Burt Reynolds, American actor and director (died 2018)
- 1937 – Ian Gow, British politician (died 1990)
- 1937 – Bill Lawry, Australian cricketer and sportscaster
- 1937 – Eddie Shack, Canadian ice hockey player (died 2020)
- 1937 – Phillip Walker, American singer and guitarist (died 2010)
- 1938 – Bevan Congdon, New Zealand cricketer (died 2018)
- 1939 – Gerry Goffin, American songwriter (died 2014)
- 1940 – Calvin Fowler, American basketball player (died 2013)
- 1941 – Sérgio Mendes, Brazilian pianist and composer (died 2024)
- 1942 – Otis Clay, American singer-songwriter (died 2016)
- 1943 – Joselito, Spanish singer and actor
- 1943 – Alan Rubin, American trumpet player (died 2011)
- 1944 – Mike Oxley, American lawyer and politician (died 2016)
- 1944 – Joy Williams, American novelist, short story writer, and essayist
- 1945 – Michael Scott, first CEO of Apple Inc.
- 1946 – Ian Porterfield, Scottish footballer and manager (died 2007)
- 1947 – Yukio Hatoyama, Japanese engineer and politician and Prime Minister of Japan
- 1947 – Derek Shulman, Scottish singer-songwriter and producer
- 1949 – James Silas, American basketball player
- 1951 – Mike Leavitt, American politician, 14th Governor of Utah
- 1953 – Philip Anglim, American actor
- 1953 – Jeb Bush, American banker and politician, 43rd Governor of Florida
- 1953 – Tom Veryzer, American baseball player (died 2014)
- 1954 – Wesley Strick, American director and screenwriter
- 1956 – Catherine Hickland, American actress
- 1956 – Didier Lockwood, French violinist (died 2018)
- 1957 – Tina Ambani, Indian actress and chairperson
- 1959 – Roberto Moreno, Brazilian race car driver
- 1960 – Richard Mastracchio, American engineer and astronaut
- 1961 – Carey Lowell, American actress
- 1962 – Tammy Baldwin, American lawyer and politician
- 1962 – Diane Franklin, American actress
- 1962 – Sheryl Crow, American singer-songwriter and guitarist
- 1964 – Sarah Palin, American politician, 9th Governor of Alaska
- 1964 – Ken Shamrock, American martial artist and wrestler
- 1965 – Vicki Wilson, Australian netball player
- 1967 – Ciro Ferrara, Italian footballer and manager
- 1968 – Mo Willems, American author and illustrator
- 1969 – Jennifer Aniston, American actress and producer
- 1969 – Andreas Hilfiker, Swiss footballer
- 1969 – John Salako, Nigerian-English footballer, manager, and sportscaster
- 1971 – Damian Lewis, English actor
- 1972 – Steve McManaman, English footballer
- 1972 – Kelly Slater, American surfer
- 1973 – Varg Vikernes, Norwegian guitarist and songwriter
- 1974 – Nick Barmby, English footballer and manager
- 1974 – D'Angelo, American singer-songwriter, guitarist, and producer (died 2025)
- 1974 – Alex Jones, American radio show host and conspiracy theorist
- 1974 – Isaiah Mustafa, American actor and football player
- 1974 – Jaroslav Špaček, Czech ice hockey player and coach
- 1975 – Andy Lally, American race car driver
- 1975 – Callum Thorp, Australian cricketer
- 1975 – Jacque Vaughn, American basketball player and coach
- 1976 – Tony Battie, American basketball player and sportscaster
- 1976 – Bryce Salvador, Canadian ice hockey player
- 1977 – Mike Shinoda, American musician and artist
- 1978 – Roc Marciano, American rapper and record producer
- 1979 – Brandy Norwood, American singer-songwriter, producer, and actress
- 1980 – Matthew Lawrence, American actor and singer
- 1981 – Kelly Rowland, American singer and actress
- 1982 – Daryn Colledge, American football player
- 1982 – Natalie Dormer, English actress
- 1982 – Ľubomíra Kalinová, Slovak biathlete
- 1982 – Neil Robertson, Australian snooker player
- 1983 – Rafael van der Vaart, Dutch footballer
- 1984 – Maarten Heisen, Dutch sprinter
- 1984 – Marco Marcato, Italian cyclist
- 1984 – Aubrey O'Day, American singer and reality television personality
- 1984 – Maxime Talbot, Canadian ice hockey player
- 1984 – Alando Tucker, American basketball player and coach
- 1985 – Mike Richards, Canadian ice hockey player
- 1985 – Šárka Strachová, Czech skier
- 1986 – Gabriel Boric, Chilean politician, 36th President of Chile
- 1987 – Luca Antonelli, Italian footballer
- 1987 – Juanmi Callejón, Spanish footballer
- 1987 – Brian Matusz, American baseball player (died 2025)
- 1987 – Jan Smeekens, Dutch speed skater
- 1987 – Ellen van Dijk, Dutch cyclist
- 1988 – Vlad Moldoveanu, Romanian basketball player
- 1990 – Javier Aquino, Mexican footballer
- 1990 – Q'orianka Kilcher, German-American actress
- 1990 – Hwang Chan-sung, South Korean singer and actor
- 1991 – Laurent Duvernay-Tardif, Canadian football player and medical doctor
- 1991 – Nikola Mirotic, Spanish basketball player
- 1992 – Lasse Norman Hansen, Danish track and road cyclist
- 1992 – Taylor Lautner, American actor
- 1992 – Jake Matthews, American football player
- 1993 – Ben McLemore, American basketball player
- 1994 – Dansby Swanson, American baseball player
- 1995 – Milan Škriniar, Slovak footballer
- 1995 – Rick Karsdorp, Dutch footballer
- 1996 – Daniil Medvedev, Russian tennis player
- 1996 – Jonathan Tah, German footballer
- 1996 – Lucas Torreira, Uruguayan footballer
- 1997 – Damien Harris, American football player
- 1997 – Mike Hughes, American football player
- 1997 – Hubert Hurkacz, Polish tennis player
- 1997 – Rosé, New Zealand-South Korean singer and dancer
- 1997 – Zavier Simpson, American basketball player
- 1998 – Trent Frederic, American ice hockey player
- 1998 – Josh Jacobs, American football player
- 1998 – Khalid, American singer and songwriter
- 2000 – Nassir Little, American basketball player
- 2001 – Bryan Gil, Spanish footballer
- 2002 – Liam Lawson, New Zealand racing driver

== Deaths ==
=== Pre-1600 ===
- AD 55 – Britannicus, Roman son of Claudius (born 41)
- 244 – Gordian III, Roman emperor (born 225)
- 641 – Heraclius, Byzantine emperor (born 575)
- 731 – Pope Gregory II (born 669)
- 824 – Pope Paschal I
- 1141 – Hugh of Saint Victor, German philosopher and theologian (born 1096)
- 1503 – Elizabeth of York, Queen Consort of England (born 1466)

=== 1601–1900 ===
- 1626 – Pietro Cataldi, Italian mathematician and astronomer (born 1548)
- 1650 – René Descartes, French mathematician and philosopher (born 1596)
- 1755 – Francesco Scipione, marchese di Maffei, Italian archaeologist, playwright, and critic (born 1675)
- 1763 – William Shenstone, English poet and gardener (born 1714)
- 1768 – George Dance the Elder, English architect, designed St Leonard's and St Botolph's Aldgate (born 1695)
- 1795 – Carl Michael Bellman, Swedish poet and composer (born 1740)
- 1811 – Juan Sánchez Ramírez, leader of the troops that fought against the French rule of Santo Domingo's colony between 1808 and 1809 (born 1762)
- 1829 – Alexander Griboyedov, Russian poet, playwright, and composer (born 1795)
- 1854 – Magdalene Osenbroch, Norwegian actress (born 1830)
- 1862 – Elizabeth Siddal, English poet and artist's model (born 1829)
- 1868 – Léon Foucault, French physicist and academic (born 1819)
- 1898 – Félix María Zuloaga, Mexican general and unconstitutional interim president (born 1813)

=== 1901–present ===
- 1901 – Milan I of Serbia (born 1855)
- 1905 – Mary Pitman Ailau, high chiefess of the Kingdom of Hawaiʻi
- 1917 – Oswaldo Cruz, Brazilian physician and epidemiologist (born 1872)
- 1918 – Alexey Kaledin, Russian general (born 1861)
- 1931 – Charles Algernon Parsons, English-Irish engineer, invented the steam turbine (born 1854)
- 1938 – Kalle Korhonen, Finnish politician (born 1878)
- 1940 – John Buchan, Scottish-Canadian historian and politician, Governor General of Canada (born 1875)
- 1940 – Ellen Day Hale, American painter and author (born 1855)
- 1942 – Jamnalal Bajaj, Indian businessman and philanthropist (born 1884)
- 1947 – Martin Klein, Estonian wrestler and coach (born 1884)
- 1948 – Sergei Eisenstein, Russian director and screenwriter (born 1898)
- 1949 – Axel Munthe, Swedish doctor (born 1857)
- 1958 – Ernest Jones, Welsh neurologist and psychoanalyst (born 1879)
- 1963 – John Olof Dahlgren, Swedish-American soldier, Medal of Honor recipient (born 1872)
- 1963 – Sylvia Plath, American poet, novelist, and short story writer (born 1932)
- 1967 – A. J. Muste, Dutch-American minister and activist (born 1885)
- 1968 – Howard Lindsay, American playwright (born 1889)
- 1973 – J. Hans D. Jensen, German physicist and academic, Nobel Prize laureate (born 1907)
- 1975 – Richard Ratsimandrava, Malagasy colonel and politician, President of Madagascar (born 1931)
- 1976 – Lee J. Cobb, American actor (born 1911)
- 1976 – Alexander Lippisch, German pilot and engineer (born 1894)
- 1977 – Fakhruddin Ali Ahmed, Indian lawyer and politician, 5th President of India (born 1905)
- 1977 – Louis Beel, Dutch academic and politician, Prime Minister of the Netherlands (born 1902)
- 1978 – James Bryant Conant, American chemist and academic (born 1893)
- 1978 – Harry Martinson, Swedish novelist, essayist, and poet, Nobel Prize laureate (born 1904)
- 1982 – Eleanor Powell, American actress and dancer (born 1912)
- 1985 – Henry Hathaway, American actor, director, and producer (born 1898)
- 1986 – Frank Herbert, American journalist and author (born 1920)
- 1986 – Evelio Javier, Filipino politician (born 1942)
- 1989 – George O'Hanlon, American actor and voice artist (born 1912)
- 1991 – Dude Martin, American country singer, bandleader, radio and television host (born 1915)
- 1993 – Robert W. Holley, American biochemist and academic, Nobel Prize laureate (born 1922)
- 1994 – Neil Bonnett, American race car driver (born 1946)
- 1994 – Sorrell Booke, American actor and director (born 1930)
- 1994 – William Conrad, American actor, director, and producer (born 1920)
- 1994 – Paul Feyerabend, Austrian-Swiss philosopher and academic (born 1924)
- 1996 – Amelia Rosselli, Italian poet and author (born 1930)
- 2000 – Lord Kitchner, Trinidadian singer (born 1922)
- 2000 – Roger Vadim, French director, producer, and screenwriter (born 1928)
- 2002 – Frankie Crosetti, American baseball player and coach (born 1910)
- 2002 – Barry Foster, English actor (born 1931)
- 2004 – Tony Pope, American voice actor (born 1947)
- 2004 – Shirley Strickland, Australian runner (born 1925)
- 2005 – Jack L. Chalker, American author (born 1944)
- 2006 – Wendy Barnes, British overseas radio broadcaster (born 1916)
- 2006 – Peter Benchley, American author and screenwriter (born 1940)
- 2006 – Ken Fletcher, Australian tennis player (born 1940)
- 2006 – Jackie Pallo, English wrestler and actor (born 1926)
- 2006 – Matilda, American chicken and stage magician, oldest known chicken (h. 1990)
- 2008 – Tom Lantos, American lawyer and politician (born 1928)
- 2008 – Frank Piasecki, American engineer (born 1919)
- 2009 – Estelle Bennett, American singer (born 1941)
- 2009 – Willem Johan Kolff, Dutch-American physician and academic (born 1911)
- 2010 – Heward Grafftey, Canadian businessman and politician (born 1928)
- 2010 – Alexander McQueen, English fashion designer, founder of his eponymous brand (born 1969)
- 2011 – Chuck Tanner, American baseball player and manager (born 1928)
- 2012 – Siri Bjerke, Norwegian politician, Norwegian Minister of the Environment (born 1958)
- 2012 – Aharon Davidi, Israeli general (born 1927)
- 2012 – Whitney Houston, American singer-songwriter, producer, and actress (born 1963)
- 2013 – Rick Huxley, English bass player (born 1940)
- 2014 – Alice Babs, Swedish singer and actress (born 1924)
- 2014 – Tito Canepa, Dominican-American painter (born 1916)
- 2014 – Fernando González Pacheco, Colombian journalist and actor (born 1932)
- 2015 – Roger Hanin, French actor, director, and screenwriter (born 1925)
- 2015 – Bob Simon, American journalist (born 1941)
- 2015 – Jerry Tarkanian, American basketball player and coach (born 1930)
- 2016 – Kevin Randleman, American mixed martial artist and wrestler (born 1971)
- 2016 – Zeng Xuelin, Thai-Chinese footballer and manager (born 1929)
- 2017 – Fab Melo, Brazilian basketball player (born 1990)
- 2017 – Jaap Rijks, Dutch Olympian (born 1919)
- 2017 – Trish Doan, Korean-Canadian musician (born 1985)
- 2018 – Vic Damone, American singer, songwriter and actor (born 1928)
- 2018 – Asma Jahangir, Pakistani human-rights lawyer and social activist (born 1952)
- 2018 – Jan Maxwell, American stage and television actress (born 1956)
- 2018 – Qazi Wajid, Pakistani drama actor, writer and artist (born 1930)
- 2023 – Donald Spoto, American biographer (born 1941)
- 2024 – Allen J. Bard, American chemist (born 1933)
- 2024 – Kelvin Kiptum, African long-distance runner(born 1999)
- 2025 – Betsy Arakawa, American classical pianist (born 1959)
- 2025 – Moses Lim, Singaporean actor (born 1949)
- 2026 – James Van Der Beek, American actor (born 1977)

== Holidays and observances ==
- Christian feast day:
  - Blaise Eastern Orthodox liturgics
  - Cædmon, first recorded Christian poet in England, c. 680 CE (Anglicanism)
  - Gobnait
  - Gregory II
  - Lazarus of Milan
  - Peter of Jesus Maldonado
  - Soteris
  - February 11 (Eastern Orthodox liturgics)
- European 112 Day (European Union)
- Armed Forces Day (Liberia)
- Evelio Javier Day (Panay Island, the Philippines)
- Feast day of Our Lady of Lourdes (Catholic Church), and its related observance
  - World Day of the Sick (Roman Catholic Church)
- Inventors' Day (United States)
- National Foundation Day (Japan)
- Youth Day (Cameroon)
- International Day of Women and Girls in Science (UN Women)

== Works cited ==
- Larkin, Colin (2011). The Encyclopedia of Popular Music. Omnibus Press. ISBN 978-0-85712-595-8.
- Lentz, Harris M. (2014). Heads of States and Governments Since 1945. Routledge. p. 529. ISBN 978-1-134-26490-2.
