= List of German supercentenarians =

People from Germany who have attained or surpassed the age of 110 years

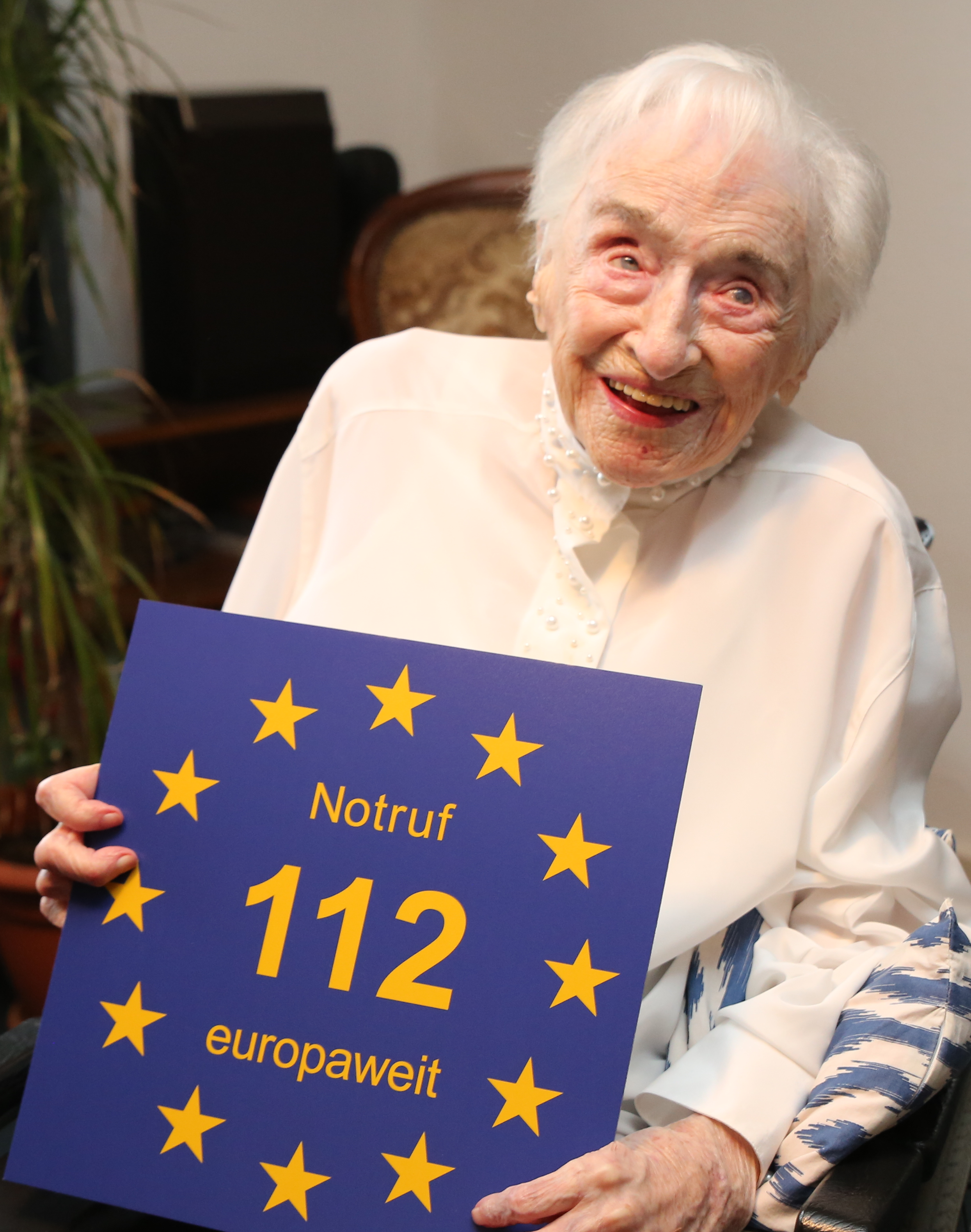
Edelgard Huber von Gersdorff (1905–2018) was one of the oldest Germans ever recorded. At age 112, she was part of an awareness campaign for the EU's 112 emergency number.

As of January 2015, the Gerontology Research Group (GRG) had validated the longevity claims of 59 German citizens who have become "supercentenarians", attaining or surpassing 110 years of age. 49 of these were German residents and 10 were emigrants. The oldest known German alive is Ilse Neumann, born on 23 July 1914, aged 112 years, 117 days. Augusta Holtz, an emigrant to the United States, remains the oldest German citizen whose age has been verified: she lived 115 years, 79 days, from 1871 to 1986.

== 100 oldest Germans ==
Deceased Living

Rank	Name	Sex	Birth date	Death date	Age	Birthplace	Place of death or residence
1	Augusta Holtz	F	3 August 1871	21 October 1986	115 years, 79 days	Posen (Note: Holtz was born in Czarnikau, then in the German Empire, now Czarnków in Poland.)	United States
2	Charlotte Kretschmann	F	3 December 1909	27 August 2024	114 years, 268 days	Silesia (Note: Kretschmann was born in Breslau, then in the German Empire, now Wrocław in Poland.)	Baden-Württemberg
3	Charlotte Benkner	F	16 November 1889	14 May 2004	114 years, 180 days	Saxony	United States
4	Ilse Meingast	F	14 March 1912	23 August 2026	114 years, 162 days	Brandenburg	United States
5	Josefine Ollmann	F	11 November 1908	16 July 2022	113 years, 247 days	Bavaria	Schleswig-Holstein
6	Luzia Mohrs	F	23 March 1904	16 October 2017	113 years, 207 days	Rhineland	Brazil
7	Louise Schaaf	F	16 October 1906	25 April 2020	113 years, 192 days	Baden	United States
8	Erna Brosig	F	15 January 1911	23 July 2024	113 years, 190 days	Silesia (Note: Brosig was born in Breslau, then in the German Empire, now Wrocław in Poland.)	Lower Saxony
9	Mary Drymalski	F	22 July 1880	1 December 1993	113 years, 132 days	West Prussia (Note: Drymalski was born in Culm, then in the German Empire, now Chełmno in Poland.)	United States
10	Maria Aulenbacher	F	7 November 1909	8 February 2023	113 years, 93 days	Hesse-Nassau	United States
11	Adelheid Kirschbaum	F	29 September 1883	21 December 1996	113 years, 83 days	Rhineland	United States
12	Mathilde Mange	F	10 August 1906	28 October 2019	113 years, 79 days	Rhineland	North Rhine-Westphalia
13	Anna Cernohorsky	F	13 September 1909	18 September 2022	113 years, 5 days	Bohemia (Note: Cernohorsky was born in Molschen, Bohemia, then part of Austria-Hungary, now Malešov in the Czech Republic.)	Saxony
14	Maria Laqua	F	12 February 1889	9 February 2002	112 years, 362 days	Rhineland	Rhineland-Palatinate
15	Rosa Rein	F	24 March 1897	14 February 2010	112 years, 327 days	Silesia (Note: Rein was born in Myslowitz, then in the German Empire, now Mysłowice in Poland.)	Switzerland
16	Anna Bechler	F	28 September 1907	29 July 2020	112 years, 305 days	Bavaria	United States
17	Hildegard Lange	F	12 January 1907	8 September 2019	112 years, 239 days	East Prussia (Note: Lange was born in Allenstein, now Olsztyn in Poland.)	North Rhine-Westphalia
18	Gertruda Gorecka	F	12 November 1911	25 June 2024	112 years, 226 days	West Prussia (Note: Gorecka was born in Kamlau, then in the German Empire, now Kębłowo in Poland.)	Canada
19	Lydia Smuda	F	6 November 1906	6 June 2019	112 years, 212 days	Rhineland	Hamburg
20	Martha Henze	F	4 December 1912	3 July 2025	112 years, 211 days	Rhineland	North Rhine-Westphalia
21	Frieda Szwillus	F	30 March 1902	21 September 2014	112 years, 175 days	Anhalt	Saxony
22	Marguerite Petit	F	3 July 1883	21 December 1995	112 years, 171 days	Lorraine (Note: Petit was born in Lemberg, then part of the German Empire, now located in France.)	France
23	Babette Endres	F	1 August 1910	12 January 2023	112 years, 164 days	Bavaria	Baden-Württemberg
24	Berta Rosenberg	F	5 September 1896	28 January 2009	112 years, 145 days	Hesse-Nassau	United States
25	Martha Rein	F	17 August 1874	6 January 1987	112 years, 142 days	Bavaria	United States
26	Gertrud Henze	F	8 December 1901	22 April 2014	112 years, 135 days	Pomerania	Lower Saxony
27	Edelgard Huber von Gersdorff	F	7 December 1905	9 April 2018	112 years, 123 days	Reuss-Gera	Baden-Württemberg
28	Ottilie Reimers	F	30 January 1913	24 May 2025	112 years, 114 days	Hamburg	Schleswig-Holstein
29	Therese Fenners	F	8 March 1906	23 June 2018	112 years, 107 days	Rhineland	North Rhine-Westphalia
30	Elisabeth Tränkner	F	11 August 1906	7 November 2018	112 years, 88 days	Hesse-Nassau	Baden-Württemberg
31	Meta Berndt	F	9 November 1889	28 December 2001	112 years, 49 days	Pomerania (Note: Berndt was born in Kaffzig, then in the German Empire, now Kawcze in Poland.)	North Rhine-Westphalia
32	Johanna Klink	F	17 January 1903	20 February 2015	112 years, 34 days	Silesia (Note: Klink was born in Siemianowitz, then in the German Empire, now Siemianowice in Poland.)	Saxony
33	Irmgard von Stephani	F	20 September 1895	5 October 2007	112 years, 15 days	Hesse-Nassau	Berlin
34	Hildegard Rau	F	31 July 1912	29 July 2024	111 years, 364 days	Württemberg	Baden-Württemberg
35	Katherine Bodenbender	F	19 April 1905	16 April 2017	111 years, 362 days	Hesse-Nassau	United States
36	Anna Styś	F	24 July 1908	1 July 2020	111 years, 343 days	West Prussia (Note: Styś was born in Sopczyn, then in the German Empire, now Zapceń in Poland.)	Poland
36	Katharina Hagemeyer	F	4 August 1908	12 July 2020	111 years, 343 days	Rhineland	North Rhine-Westphalia
38	Amy Holmes	F	10 April 1886	1 March 1998	111 years, 325 days	Westphalia	United States
39	Adele Rodenstein	F	3 September 1908	18 July 2020	111 years, 319 days	Rhineland (Note: Rodenstein was born in Herbesthal, which was then part of the Prussian Rhine Province. Since 1920 it is part of the Eupen-Malmedy region in Belgium.)	North Rhine-Westphalia
40	Ida Schorn	F	4 May 1864	8 March 1976	111 years, 309 days	Pomerania (Note: Schorn was born in Ratzebuhr, then part of Prussia in the German Confederation, now Okonek in Poland.)	United States
41	Anna Eistermeier	F	28 September 1910	30 July 2022	111 years, 305 days	Bavaria	Bavaria
42	Ella Neumann	F	9 October 1906	7 August 2018	111 years, 302 days	Baden	North Rhine-Westphalia
43	Elsa Peck	F	20 April 1902	28 January 2014	111 years, 283 days	Hanover	Lower Saxony
44	Lina Zimmer	F	20 November 1892	28 August 2004	111 years, 282 days	Württemberg	Baden-Württemberg
45	Hermann Dörnemann	M	27 May 1893	2 March 2005	111 years, 279 days	Rhineland	North Rhine-Westphalia
46	Helen Johnson	F	20 July 1896	17 April 2008	111 years, 272 days	Brandenburg	United States
47	Charlotte Klamroth	F	18 August 1903	16 May 2015	111 years, 271 days	Prussian Saxony	Rhineland-Palatinate
48	Magdalene Regener	F	5 March 1891	19 November 2002	111 years, 259 days	Hesse-Nassau	Lower Saxony
49	Pauline Raißle	F	16 December 1905	29 August 2017	111 years, 256 days	Württemberg	Baden-Württemberg
50	Margot Petzold	F	14 January 1911	20 September 2022	111 years, 249 days	(unknown)	Thuringia
51	Catherine Trompeter	F	26 March 1895	18 November 2006	111 years, 237 days	Alsace (Note: Trompeter was born in Alsace, then part of the German Empire, now in France.)	France
52	Elisabeth Heck	F	11 July 1893	3 February 2005	111 years, 207 days	Baden	Hesse
53	Else Rönsch	F	17 March 1904	5 October 2015	111 years, 202 days	Pomerania	Mecklenburg-Vorpommern
54	Joanna Lipińska	F	18 August 1910	6 March 2022	111 years, 200 days	Posen (Note: Lipińska was born in a part of the Prussian province of Posen, then in the German Empire, now part of the Greater Poland Voivodeship in Poland.)	Poland
55	Hedy Wegier	F	25 October 1903	12 May 2015	111 years, 199 days	Silesia (Note: Wegier was born in Silesia, then in the German Empire, now in Poland.)	United States
56	Adele Lankenau	F	27 March 1913	6 October 2024	111 years, 193 days	Hanover	Lower Saxony
57	Paula Baumgärtner	F	16 August 1881	24 February 1993	111 years, 192 days	Westphalia	Baden-Württemberg
58	Hélène Le Bozec	F	24 December 1908	27 June 2020	111 years, 186 days	Alsace (Note: Bozec was born in Illkirch-Grafenstaden, then part of the German Empire, now Illkirch-Graffenstaden in France.)	France
59	Margarete Ottmann	F	23 February 1903	17 August 2014	111 years, 175 days	Silesia (Note: Ottmann was born in Bauerwitz, then in the German Empire, now Baborów in Poland.)	Bavaria
59	Ilse Beck	F	5 October 1906	29 March 2018	111 years, 175 days	Saxony	Thuringia
61	Elisabeth Schneider	F	19 August 1901	9 February 2013	111 years, 174 days	Westphalia	Lower Saxony
62	Frieda Borchert	F	5 January 1897	22 June 2008	111 years, 169 days	Pomerania (Note: Borchert was born in Gusscht, then in the German Empire, now in Poland.)	Berlin
63	Christine Hoscheid	F	16 February 1907	1 August 2018	111 years, 166 days	Rhineland	North Rhine-Westphalia
64	Anna Mehlberg	F	2 December 1906	15 May 2018	111 years, 164 days	Brandenburg	Berlin
65	Margarete Dannheimer	F	28 January 1904	2 July 2015	111 years, 155 days	Bavaria	Bavaria
66	Jeanne Schneider	F	11 July 1895	11 December 2006	111 years, 153 days	Lorraine (Note: Schneider was born in Weimeringen, then part of the German Empire, now Veymerange, part of Thionville, in France.)	France
67	Józefa Ciesielska	F	6 March 1912	3 August 2023	111 years, 150 days	Posen (Note: Ciesielska was born in Vorwerk Krolewiec, then in the German Empire, now Królewiec, part of the Greater Poland Voivodeship, in Poland.)	Poland
68	Rosa Rose	F	4 December 1903	25 April 2015	111 years, 142 days	Hanover	Lower Saxony
69	Karolina Krüger	F	17 February 1885	3 July 1996	111 years, 137 days	Rhineland	North Rhine-Westphalia
70	Katharina Braun	F	23 September 1867	5 February 1979	111 years, 135 days	Bavaria (Palatinate)	Rhineland-Palatinate
71	Hedwig Wickert	F	17 July 1909	28 November 2020	111 years, 134 days	Rhineland	North Rhine-Westphalia
72	Anna Stephan	F	25 March 1892	3 August 2003	111 years, 131 days	Bohemia (Note: Stephan was born in Bohemia, then part of Austria-Hungary, now in the Czech Republic.)	Bavaria
73	Friedrich Reichenstein	M	1 February 1906	9 June 2017	111 years, 128 days	Westphalia	Israel
74	Maria-Anna Higelin	F	18 November 1882	21 March 1994	111 years, 123 days	Alsace (Note: Higelin was born in Didenheim, then part of the German Empire, now located in France.)	France
75	Anna Braun	F	5 July 1911	29 October 2022	111 years, 116 days	(unknown)	Brandenburg
76	Gertrud Teichgräber	F	22 November 1908	16 March 2020	111 years, 115 days	Brandenburg	Lower Saxony
77	Anne Matthiesen	F	26 November 1884	19 March 1996	111 years, 114 days	Schleswig-Holstein (Note: Matthiesen was born in Hadersleben (now Haderslev), in the Northern Schleswig region, then part of Prussia, which was reunited with Denmark in 1920. She died in the same region.)	Denmark
78	Gertrud Blohm	F	7 September 1912	29 December 2023	111 years, 113 days	Mecklenburg-Schwerin	Mecklenburg-Vorpommern
79	Maria Gabriella Lerchenthal	F	8 June 1913	13 September 2024	111 years, 97 days	Bavaria	Italy
80	Elsa Tauser	F	10 July 1896	6 October 2007	111 years, 88 days	Hamburg	Schleswig-Holstein
80	Käthe Wulf	F	23 March 1902	19 June 2013	111 years, 88 days	Oldenburg	Hesse
82	Ilse Schade	F	26 April 1910	20 July 2021	111 years, 85 days	Brandenburg	Baden-Württemberg
83	Bertha Lindemann	F	11 March 1891	29 May 2002	111 years, 79 days	Brunswick	Lower Saxony
83	Eleonora Łosiewicz	F	24 January 1910	13 April 2021	111 years, 79 days	Posen (Note: Łosiewicz was born in a part of the Prussian province of Posen, then in the German Empire, now part of the Greater Poland Voivodeship in Poland.)	Poland
85	Johanna Frank	F	15 September 1875	24 November 1986	111 years, 70 days	Hamburg	United States
86	Ingeborg Fründt	F	24 April 1913	1 July 2024	111 years, 68 days	Hanover	Lower Saxony
87	Katie Logemann	F	15 December 1907	19 February 2019	111 years, 66 days	Oldenburg	United States
88	Emilie Kreckmann	F	28 October 1912	18 December 2023	111 years, 51 days	Bavaria	Saarland
89	Anna Palarowska	F	22 October 1902	2 November 2013	111 years, 11 days	West Prussia (Note: Palarowska was born in Mroczno, then in the German Empire, now located in Poland.)	France
90	Feuke Glato	F	26 December 1908	31 December 2019	111 years, 5 days	Hanover	Lower Saxony
91	Else Aßmann	F	18 February 1902	15 February 2013	110 years, 363 days	Brandenburg	Berlin
92	Dorothea Duisberg	F	7 October 1912	2 October 2023	110 years, 360 days	Bremen	Chile
93	Hans Schornack	M	29 February 1912	22 February 2023	110 years, 359 days	Rhineland	North Rhine-Westphalia
94	Anna 'Änne' Matschewsky	F	3 October 1912	23 September 2023	110 years, 355 days	Rhineland	Baden-Württemberg
95	Agnes Meier	F	30 May 1907	19 May 2018	110 years, 354 days	(unknown)	North Rhine-Westphalia
96	Carl Berner	M	27 January 1902	7 January 2013	110 years, 346 days	Württemberg	United States
96	Luise Forster	F	24 February 1910	4 February 2021	110 years, 346 days	Brandenburg	Berlin
98	Aloysia Tilscher	F	9 December 1893	8 November 2004	110 years, 335 days	Moravia (Note: Tilscher was born in Moravia, then part of Austria-Hungary, now in the Czech Republic.)	Bavaria
99	Hildegard Henke	F	4 November 1905	27 September 2016	110 years, 328 days	Rhineland	North Rhine-Westphalia
100	Frieda Schmidt	F	15 December 1899	6 November 2010	110 years, 326 days	Brandenburg	Brandenburg

== Biographies ==
=== Augusta Holtz ===
Augusta Holtz (3 August 1871 – 21 October 1986) was born in Czarnikau, today in Poland. In 1873 her family emigrated to the United States, where her father had a farm in Troy, Illinois. After the 12 October 1983 she was the oldest living person in the world and from 14 May 1985 to 11 May 1990 she held the record for the longest verified age span. She was the first recorded person to reach the age of 114 and 115, as well as the first person to reach the mark of one million lived hours, which she achieved on the first of September 1985. She died at the age of 115 years and 79 days in the St. Sophia Geriatric Center in Florissant, Missouri.

=== Maria Laqua ===
Maria Laqua (12 February 1889 – 9 February 2002) was born in Rheydt-Odenkirchen, Rhineland, today in North Rhine-Westphalia, as one of 13 children. She worked as a housemaid, got married, and gave birth to two sons in the 1920s, who both died in the Second World War. Her husband Charles died in 1958. She lived for 35 years in a retirement home in Bad Hönningen, Rhineland-Palatinate. She was survived by a great-niece who attended her regularly. Laqua was bedridden during her final years and spoke only occasionally. She was the oldest person ever in Germany when she died in her sleep aged 112 years, 362 days. Her record age was surpassed by Josefine Ollmann in November 2021.

=== Hermann Dörnemann ===
Hermann Dörnemann (27 May 1893 – 2 March 2005) was, at the time of his death, the oldest living person in Germany and the oldest living man in Europe for about one year. After the death of 113-year-old American Fred Harold Hale in November 2004, Dörnemann was believed to have become the world's oldest living man, but Emiliano Mercado del Toro from Puerto Rico was later confirmed to be almost two years older. Dörnemann credited his longevity to "drinking a beer a day". He died of pneumonia in Düsseldorf, aged 111 years, 279 days.

=== Elisabeth Schneider ===
Elisabeth Schneider (19 August 1901 – 9 February 2013) was the oldest living person in Germany from November 2011 to her death in February 2013, aged 111 years and 174 days. She was born in Bad Oeynhausen, today in North Rhine-Westphalia, and had two sisters. She married in 1923 and gave birth to a daughter two years later. Schneider lived on her own until the age of 97. She died in a retirement home in Varel, Lower Saxony. She was survived by her daughter, two grandchildren and four great-grandchildren.

=== Gertrud Henze ===
Gertrud Henze (8 December 1901 – 22 April 2014) was the oldest living person in Germany from February 2013 until her death in April 2014. She was born in Rügen, worked as a librarian, and never married nor had children. From 1993, she lived in a retirement home in Göttingen. She was in good health, and listed reasons for her longevity including: reading a lot, having lively contact with other people, sometimes enjoying a cigarette and a glass of wine, and never getting married. She celebrated her 112th birthday only with some friends and relatives, because the public interest in her prior birthday had been too exhausting. She enjoyed reading, with the help of a magnifying glass. Henze died at the age of 112 years and 135 days. She donated her body to medical science for genetic research.

=== Frieda Szwillus ===
Frieda Szwillus (née Hennig; 30 March 1902 – 21 September 2014) was Germany's oldest living person from April 2014 until her death five months later, aged 112 years, 175 days. She was born Frieda Hennig in Dessau (now in Saxony-Anhalt), and had six siblings. Her family moved to Erla when she was six. She was married twice, raised one biological child and three stepchildren, and outlived all of them. Until her later years, Szwillus lived at home in Raschau with her family. She was in good physical condition, but suffered from dementia. Her family attributed her longevity to a lively family life. She often visited her siblings, but never went on holiday. She also enjoyed knitting and embroidering. She died at the age of 112 years and 175 days.

=== Josefine Ollmann ===
In November 2021, Josefine Ollmann (11 November 1908 – 16 July 2022) surpassed Maria Laqua's age to become, at the time, the oldest person ever in Germany and the first German to officially reach the age of 113. Ollmann, whose age was validated by the GRG in February 2023, died at the age of 113 years and 247 days.

== Notable unvalidated claims ==
=== Gustav Gerneth ===
Gustav Gerneth (15 October 1905 – 21 October 2019) was born in Stettin, German Empire (now Szczecin, Poland). He worked in a shipping company and at a gas plant. During the Second World War, he was a mechanic in the German air force (Luftwaffe). He married Charlotte Grubert in 1930 and the couple had three sons; she died in 1988. Gerneth lived in Havelberg in Saxony-Anhalt for over forty years, and continued to do so on his own, with family members caring for his household. According to a statement by his granddaughter on his 113th birthday, he still had a lucid mind, watching football, solving crosswords, and doing mental arithmetic. Asked for the reason for his long life, he said: "I have always been living and eating well. No diet. Always butter, never margarine. I have not touched any cigarette all my life and I drank alcohol only at celebrations." Gerneth died on 21 October 2019 of natural causes, aged 114 years and 6 days, believed to have been the world's oldest man, although Guinness World Records has not verified his case.
