= European 112 Day =

International day held on 11 February

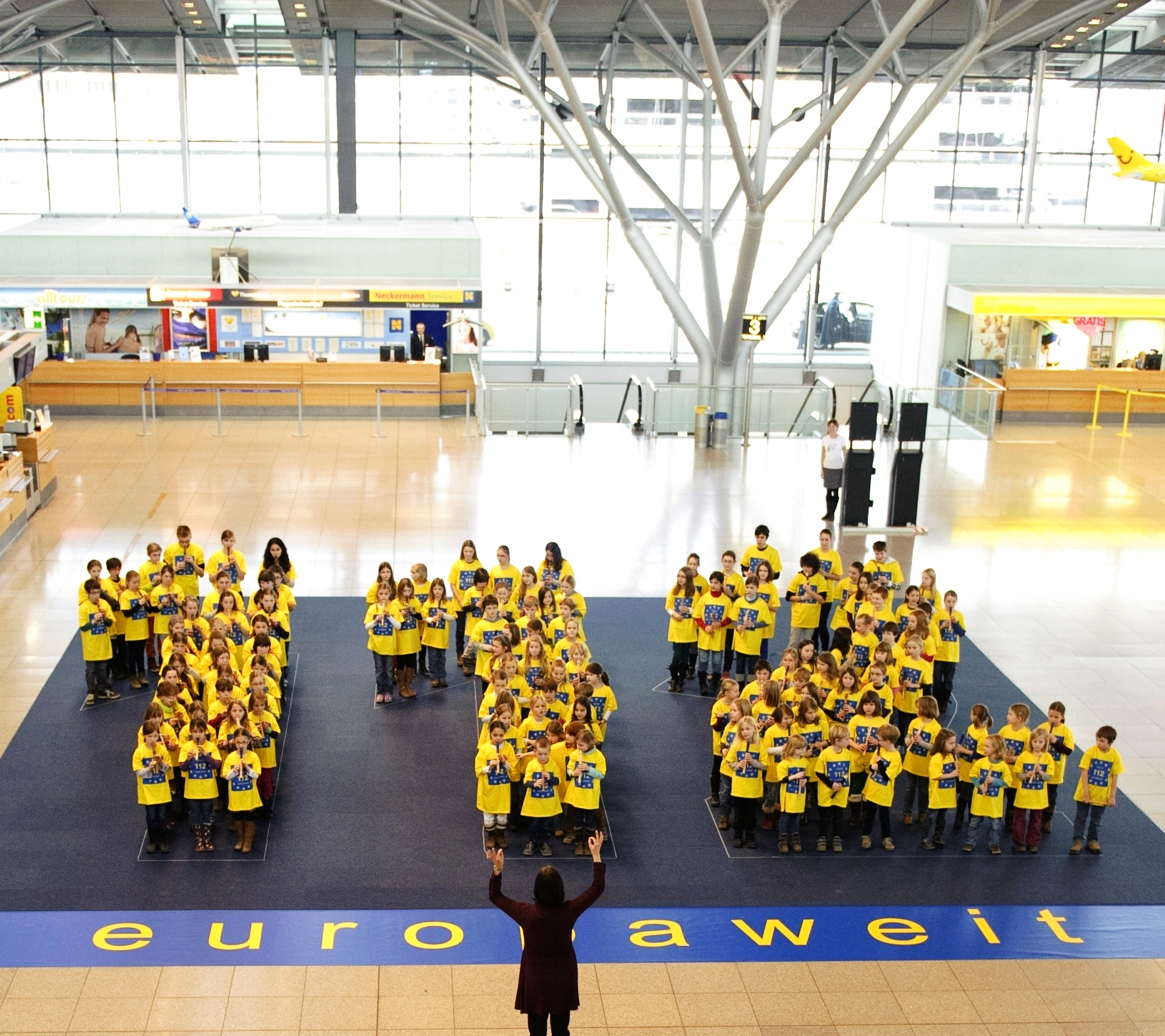
Stuttgart Airport (Germany): Pupils of the music schools Leinfelden-Echterdingen, Schönbuch and Stuttgart are playing the European anthem at the occasion of European 112 Day on 11 February 2014.

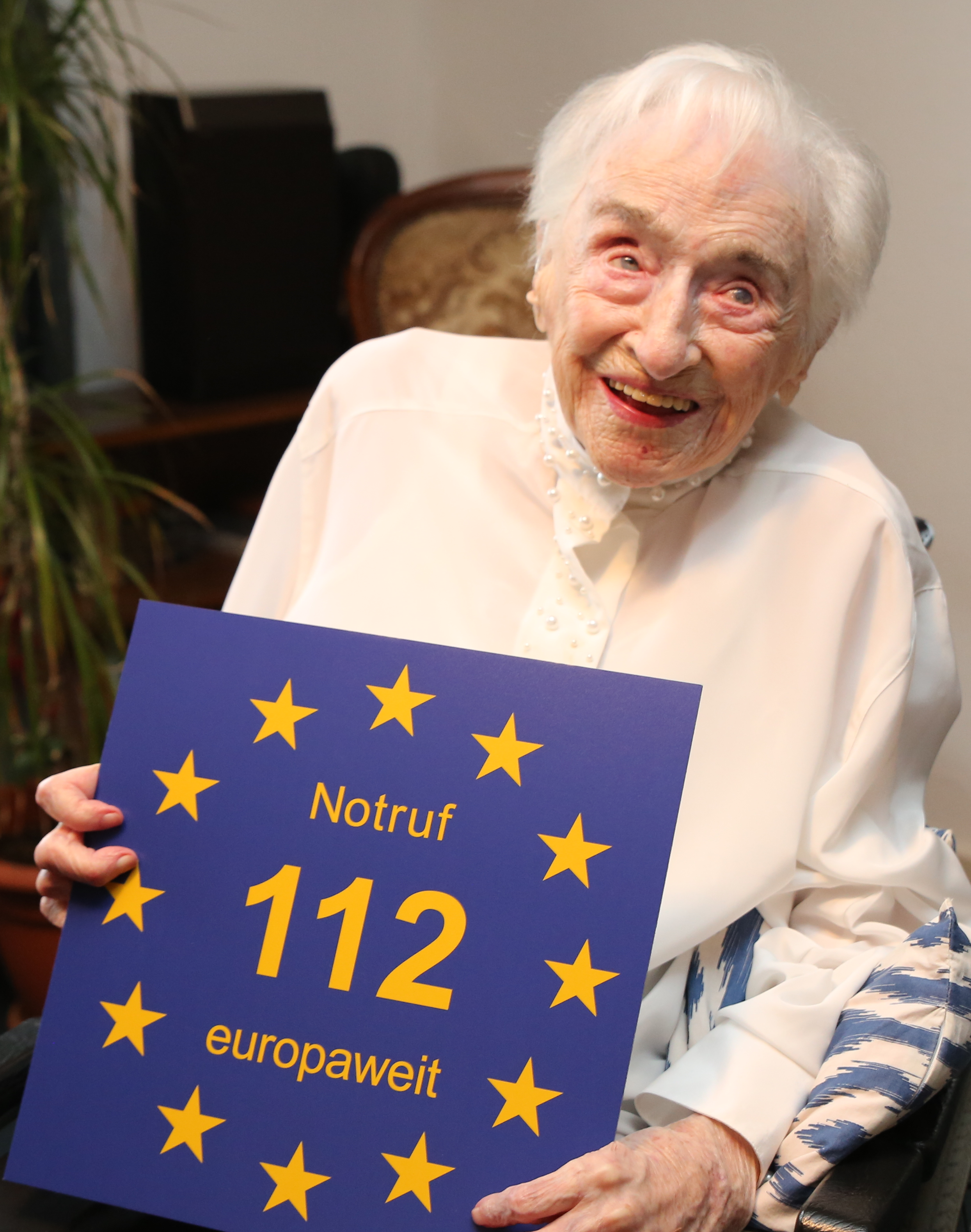
Edelgard Huber von Gersdorff, 112 years old, was honorary patroness of the campaign "One Europe – one number!", which aims at raising awareness for the European Emergency Number 112.

European 112 Day is an international day that is annually held on 11 February. It was introduced by the European Union and aims to promote the existence and appropriate use of the Europe-wide emergency number 112.

== The Europe-wide emergency call ==
In addition to the national emergency telephone numbers, the Europe-wide emergency telephone number 112 was introduced in 1991 in order to make a common emergency call available in every member state of the European Union. Since December 2008, the emergency call services can be reached from all fixed and mobile networks and free of charge with the common telephone number 112. Due to the rising publicity of 112 as the European emergency number, it is turning into a common symbol of help and support, but also of the European Union in general.

== Origins ==
The European Parliament, the Council of the European Union and the European Commission signed a tripartite convention in 2009 in order to introduce an annual European 112-day. It is supposed to raise awareness for the Europe-wide availability and the advantages of the European emergency call 112. They chose 11 February since the date includes the telephone number (11/2). The idea of dedicating one particular day to the European emergency call had been first discussed in the European Parliament in 2007 in the context of the preparations of the Declaration of the European Parliament on the European emergency call number 112. The overall necessity of increasing the awareness level of the European emergency number has been confirmed by the Flash Eurobarometer 228 from February 2008: Only 22% of all respondents, on EU-average, knew that the emergency telephone number 112 is valid and available in the entire European Union. Merely 6% in the United Kingdom and 14% in Ireland were aware of this fact. This impression was further affirmed in 2009 (EU-average 24%, United Kingdom 8%, Ireland 9%) and 2010 (EU-average 25%, United Kingdom 8%, Ireland 18%) with minor increases.

== Celebration ==
A lot of actions are taking place around Europe every year to celebrate European 112 Day. Some are organized by politicians and government officials, other by rescue services, firefighters and non-governmental organizations. In 2018, a whole variety of events dedicated to the common European emergency call were arranged in at least 23 member states of the European Union as well as in Georgia, Kosovo and Iceland. In Germany, the supercentenarian Edelgard Huber von Gersdorff, who is 112 years old and currently the oldest German woman, became honorary patroness of the campaign "One Europe – one number!", which aims at raising awareness for the European Emergency Number 112. In Belgium, the Manneken Pis, one of the most well-known landmarks of Brussels, was dressed up in a costume with the European flag and the number 112 on it by the campaign "European Emergency Number Association". In Ireland, the emergency number was promoted at the annual Young Scientist and Technology Exhibition by the Emergency Call Answering Service (ECAS). Many other representatives and associations of national emergency rescue services, like the National Federation of Firefighters of France (FNSPF), the Fire and Rescue Service of Latvia and the Luxembourg Rescue Services Agency, took different actions in order to educate the general public about the significance and the appropriate use of the European emergency call. European 112 Day 2018 has also been a major subject in the social media; with hashtags like #112day2018 and #Isupport112 going viral.

In 2021, the campaign aimed to thank the emergency services for their unconditional work. The hashtags #112Day2021 and #thankyouchain went viral on social networks and were a trend on Twitter all day.

== Sources ==
- "Council Decision of 29 July 1991 on the introduction of a single European emergency call number", Released by the Council of the European Communities, 29 July 1991
- "Joint Implementation of the European emergency number 112 – Results of the tenth data-gathering round", Working Document by the European Commission, 10 February 2017
