= Charlotte Kretschmann =

German supercentenarian (1909–2024)

- Born: Charlotte Kretschmann; 3 December 1909; Breslau, Province of Silesia, German Empire
- Died: 27 August 2024 (aged 114 years, 268 days); Kirchheim unter Teck, Baden-Württemberg, Germany
- Known for: Oldest-ever resident of Germany; Oldest living person in Germany (18 September 2022 - 27 August 2024); Surviving subject of Wilhelm II
- Spouse: Werner Kretschmann (m. 1936; died 1996)
- Children: 1

Charlotte Kretschmann (3 December 1909 – 27 August 2024) was a German supercentenarian and is Germany's oldest-ever person.

== Biography ==
Kretschmann was born in Breslau, Kingdom of Prussia, on 3 December 1909.

At the age of 27, Kretschmann met her husband Werner (c. 1936). Later that year they married and in 1937 had a daughter.

During World War II, her husband was drafted into the army and sent to the front line in France. Kretschmann remained in their hometown, but was forced to flee in 1944 with their daughter to Stuttgart, where, at the war's end, the three of them settled. Kretschmann's husband died in 1996, and her daughter died in 2019.

Kretschmann lived alone until 2014 when she suffered a brain haemorrhage. While this health scare prompted her to move into a nursing home in Kirchheim unter Teck, she was noted by doctors for her relatively remarkable health given her age. She became the oldest living person in Germany at the age of 112, and her age was verified by the Gerontology Research Group in August 2023.

Kretschmann died in Kirchheim unter Teck on 27 August 2024, at the age of 114 years and 268 days.

== See also ==
- List of the verified oldest people
- List of German supercentenarians
- List of European countries by life expectancy
