= 2016 Ad Dair shooting =

Mass shooting in Jizan Province, Saudi Arabia

- Location of Jizan Province in Saudi Arabia
- Location: 17°30′0″N 42°30′0″E; Ad Dair, Jizan Region, Saudi Arabia
- Date: February 11, 2016 (UTC+3)
- Attack type: Mass shooting, mass murder
- Weapon: Kalashnikov rifle
- Deaths: 7
- Injuries: 2

On February 11, 2016, a gunman identified as 30-year-old teacher Abdullah Jaber Al-Malki (Arabic: عبدالله المالكي), killed seven people and wounded one at an education office in Ad Dair, in Saudi Arabia's Jizan Province bordering Yemen. Five of the victims died at the scene, while two of the injured later died at the Al-Dair General Hospital.

Al-Malki was executed in 2021.
