= 112 (emergency telephone number) =

Common emergency telephone number

112 (emergency telephone number)

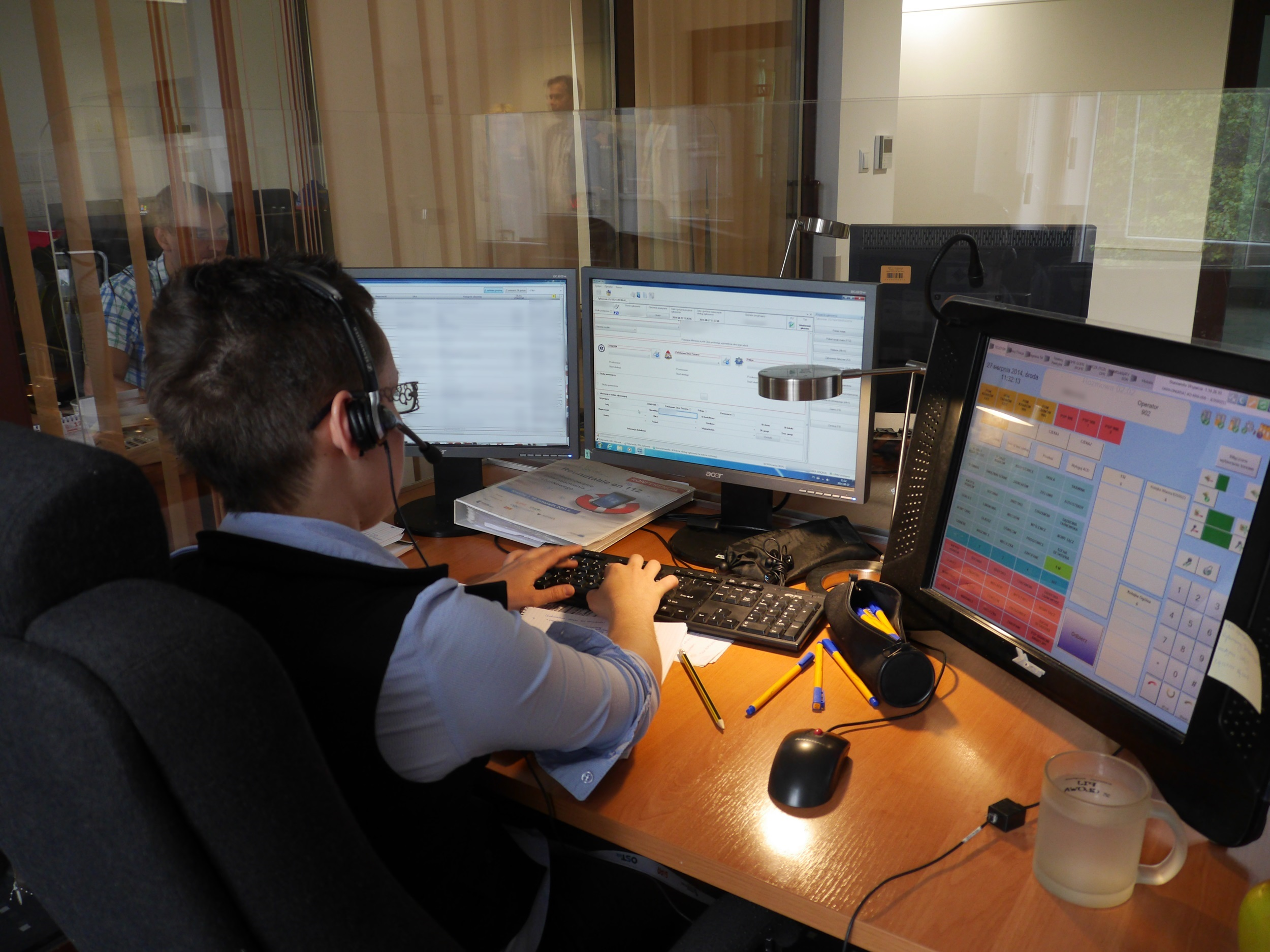
Operator in Kraków responding to a 112 phone call

112 is a common emergency telephone number that can be dialed free of charge from most mobile telephones and, in some countries, fixed telephones in order to reach emergency services (ambulance, fire and rescue, police).

112 is a part of the GSM standard, and all GSM-compatible telephone handsets are able to dial 112 even when locked or, in some countries, with no SIM card present. It is also the common emergency number in nearly all member states of the European Union as well as several other countries of Europe and the world. 112 is often available alongside other numbers historically used in the given country to access emergency services. In some countries, calls to 112 are not connected directly but forwarded by the GSM network to local emergency numbers (e.g., 911 in North America, 999 in Hong Kong, and 000 in Australia).

== Origins ==
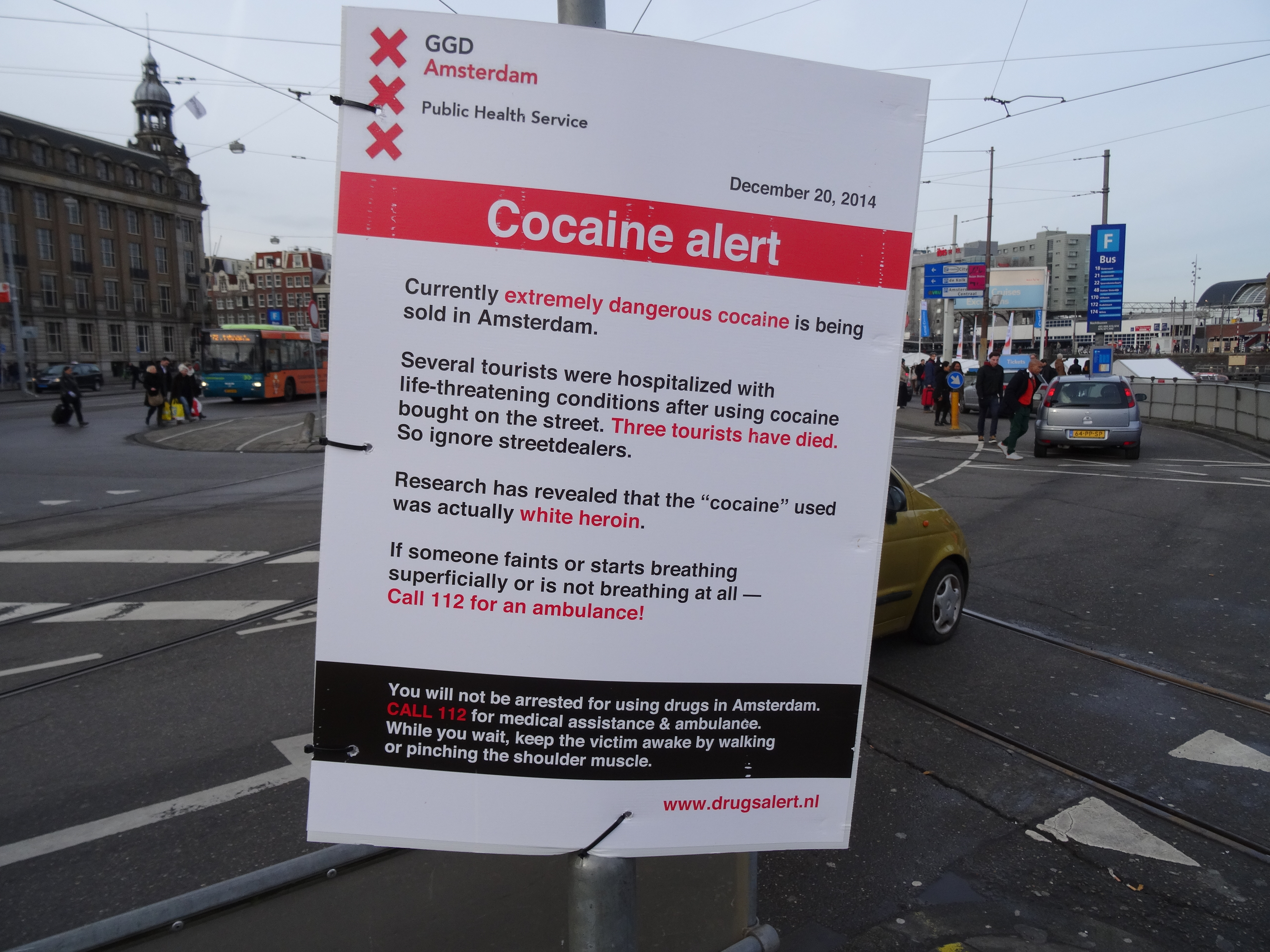
A "cocaine alert" sign posted by GGD Amsterdam: the sign reminds people to "Call 112 for an ambulance."

112 was first standardised as the pan-European number for emergency services following the adoption of recommendation by the European Conference of Postal and Telecommunications Administrations (CEPT) in 1976 and has since been enshrined a CEPT Decision ECC/DEC/(17)05.

The European Emergency Number Association, founded in 1999, an organization of emergency services representatives and others, has campaigned for an efficient 112 service all over Europe on behalf of European citizens. EENA continues to promote awareness of 112 as a core element of its mission.

This choice of number has been cited in logical terms as offering the following advantages:

- Different digits: with the numeric keypads widely used today, using at least two different digits instead of the same digit repeatedly significantly reduces the risk of accidental calls. Young children, vibrations, defective keys and collisions with other objects are much more likely to press the same key repeatedly than a particular sequence of different keys, particularly with a button-operated keypad. Accidental calls to emergency centres from mobile phones, which can dial emergency numbers even with locked keypad, are a particular problem with same-digit numbers, such as the UK's 999.
- Low digits: on rotary dial telephones, using only those digits that require the least dial rotation (1 and 2) permits a dial lock in hole 3 to effectively disable unauthorised access to the telephone network without preventing access to the emergency number 112. The same choice also maximises dialling speed. Additionally, with telephone systems using pulse dialling, briefly activating the hook once has the same effect as dialling "1", so repeatedly pushing the hook might result in calling 1-1-1. For this reason, Germany's police emergency number was changed from 111 to 110. With numeric keypads, pressing only the first and second button on the keypad is marginally easier in a difficult situation than other keys.

== Implementation ==
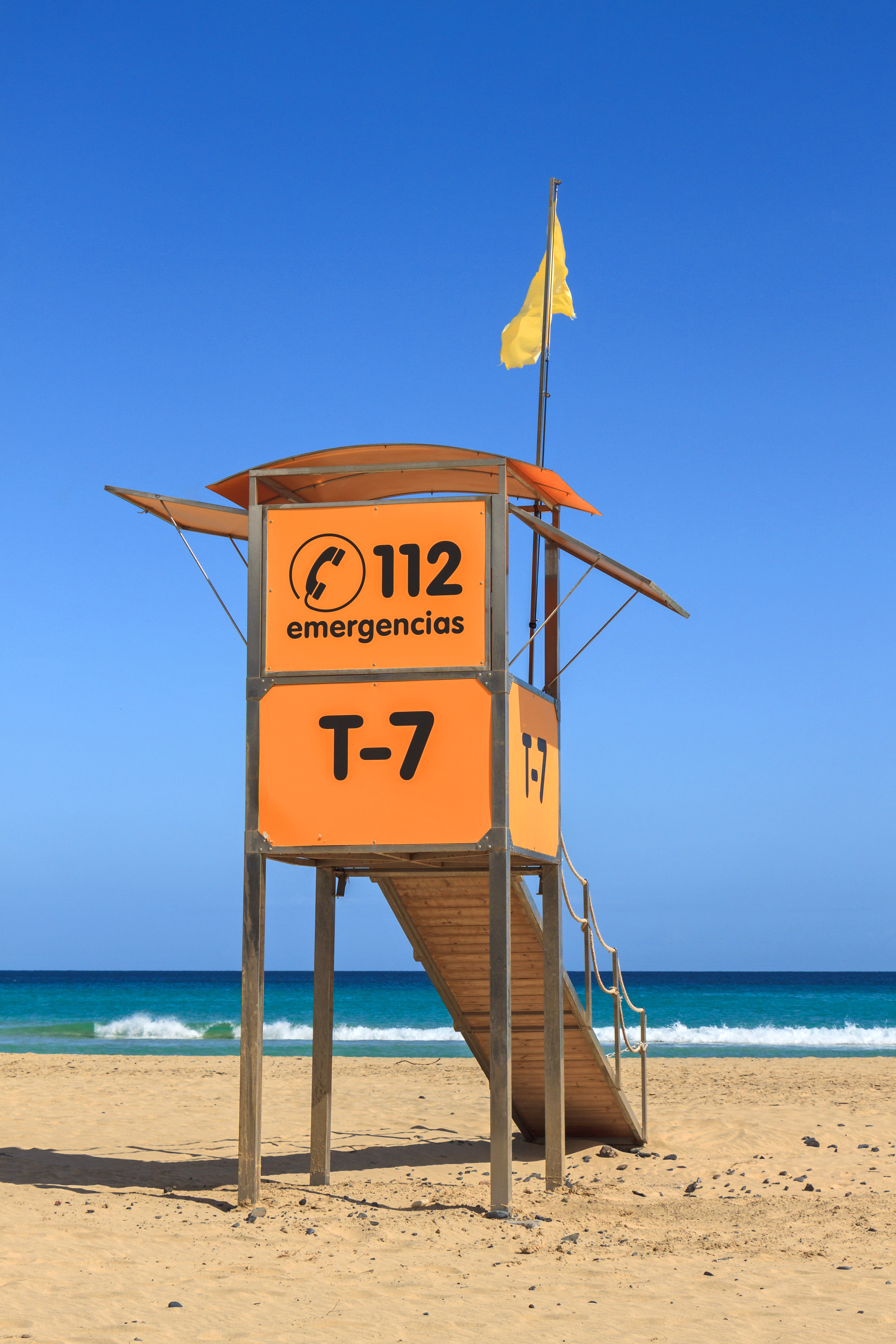
112 on a lifeguard tower in Pájara, Spain

Implementation of the two International Telecommunication Union approved emergency telephone numbers in the world: 112 911 112 and 911 Other number, no redirection or redirection for mobile phones only

After adoption in continental Western Europe, other countries began to use the 112 number for emergencies. Nations that have adopted it (including as a redirect alongside a pre-existing other emergency number) include:

=== Africa ===
- Egypt (alongside 122 for Police, 123 for Ambulance and 180 for Fire)
- Ghana
- Mauritius (Police only; alongside 114 for Ambulance and 115 for Fire)
- Morocco (alongside 19 for police, 15 for fire and ambulance, and 177 for the Gendarmerie)
- Nigeria
- Rwanda (Police and fire brigade; 912 for Ambulance)
- Senegal (alongside 17 for Police, 18 for Fire, and 15 for Ambulance)
- South Africa (alongside 10111 for Police and 10177 for Ambulance and Fire)
- Uganda (alongside 999 for Police)

=== Asia ===
- China (A recorded guidance about the correct SOS numbers in China: Police 110, Fire Services 119, Ambulance 120. GSM mobile phones will be redirected)
- East Timor
- Hong Kong (Automatically connects to the 999 emergency call centre from any local mobile phone network that has coverage in the location)
- India (112 is now the pan-country single emergency number for all emergencies. All the existing emergency numbers like 100 (police), 101 (Fire and Rescue) and 102/108 (ambulance), 181 (Woman and Child Care), 1098 (Childline), etc. are integrated to the unified number 112)
- Indonesia (alongside 110 for Police, 118 for Ambulance, 113 for Fire)
- Iran (alongside 110 for Police, 115 for Ambulance, 112 for Hilal Ahmar Ambulance and 125 for Fire; 911 is redirected to 112 on mobile phones)
- Israel (Redirects to 100 – Police – alongside 911, and will serve the planned unified center. Alongside 100 for Police, 101 for Ambulance and 102 for Fire).
- Jordan (alongside 911)
- Kazakhstan (alongside 101 for Fire, 102 for Police and 103 for Ambulance)
- Kuwait
- Kyrgyzstan (alongside 101 for Fire, 102 for Police and 103 for Ambulance)
- Lebanon (Police only; alongside 160 for Police, 140 for Ambulance and 125 for Fire)
- Macau (alongside 999)
- Malaysia (Redirects to 999 on mobile phones)
- Mongolia (alongside 102 for Police, 103 for Ambulance and 105 for Fire)
- Nepal (Police only; alongside 100 for Police, 101 for Fire and 102 for Ambulance)
- Palestine (fire dep. 102, police dep. 100, ambulance 101)
- Saudi Arabia (alongside 911)
- Singapore (redirected to 999 police line)
- South Korea (Police only; alongside 119 for Ambulance and Fire)
- Sri Lanka (Police only; alongside 119 for Police and 110 for Ambulance and Fire)
- Syria (Police only; alongside 115 for Traffic police, 110 for Ambulance and 113 for Fire)
- Taiwan (After call is connected, press 0 redirects to 110 (police), press 9 redirects to 119 (fire/rescue/ambulance))
- Thailand (call 191 for Police, 1193 for Highway Police, 1155 for Tourist Police, 1669 for Ambulance, 199 for Fire&Rescue)
- United Arab Emirates (alongside 999 for Police, 998 for Ambulance and 997 for Fire)
- Uzbekistan
- Oman (alongside 9999 for Royal Police (All emergencies))

=== Europe ===
- Albania (alongside 129 and 126 for Police, 127 for Ambulance, 128 for Fire and 125 for Maritime Rescue)
- Andorra (Ambulance and Fire, alongside 118 for same services and 110 for Police)
- Armenia (fire dep. 101, police dep. 102, ambulance 103)
- Austria (alongside 122 for Fire, 133 for Police, 144 for Rescue/Ambulance, 140 for Mountain Rescue and 141 for Nighttime General Practitioner Service; 059 133 is the non-emergency number for any local police department)
- Azerbaijan (alongside 102 for Police, 103 for Ambulance, 911 forwards to 112 on GSM carriers only)
- Basque Country 112 for the Ertzaintza, 091 for the National Police and 062 for the Civil Guard (alongside the French police).
- Belarus (Fire only; alongside 101 for Fire, 102 for Police, and 103 for Ambulance)
- Belgium (Police can also be reached through the number 101)
- Bosnia and Herzegovina (alongside 122 for Police, 123 for Fire and 124 for Ambulance)
- Bulgaria (only in Bulgarian, English, French, German, Italian, Spanish, Greek, Romanian, Turkish, or Russian) (alongside 150 for Ambulance, 160 for Fire and 166 for Police automatically redirected to 112)
- Croatia (alongside 192 for Police, 193 for Fire, 194 for Ambulance and 195 for Maritime search and rescue)
- Cyprus (alongside 199)
- Czech Republic (only in Czech, English, German, Polish, Russian and French (not by themselves, but by aid of translation software)) (alongside 155 for Ambulance, 158 for State police, 156 for Municipal police and 150 for Fire)
- Denmark (in Danish, English, Swedish and Norwegian (in some cases in German)) (including Greenland in Kalaallisut/Greenlandic, Danish and English, Faroe Islands in Faroese, Danish and English). Alongside 114 for non-emergency police and 1813 in The Capital Region for non-emergency medical.
- Estonia (in Estonian, Russian and English; sole emergency number since 11 February 2015, previously alongside 110 for Police. 1247 for non-emergency information)
- Finland (in Finnish, English and Swedish (Emergency center uses interpreter in the case of caller speaking other language than Finnish, English or Swedish.)(including Åland)
- France (alongside 15 for Ambulance, 17 for Police and 18 for Fire)
- Germany (alongside 110 for Police)
- Gibraltar (alongside 190 for Fire, 999 for Ambulance and 199 for Police)
- Georgia
- Greece (alongside 100 for the police, 108 for Coastguard, 166 for Ambulance and 199 for the fire service)
- Hungary (alongside 104 for Ambulance, 105 for Fire and 107 for Police is redirected to 112 on mobile phones)
- Iceland
- Ireland (alongside 999)
- Italy (single emergency number in most of Italy; implementation still pending in Veneto and Campania; 112 for Carabinieri, 113 for National Police, 115 for Fire, 118 for Ambulance still active)
- Kosovo (alongside 192 for Police, 193 for Fire and 194 for Ambulance)
- Latvia (alongside 110 for Police, 113 for Ambulance and 114 for Emergency gas service)
- Liechtenstein (Police only; alongside 117 for Police, 144 for Ambulance and 118 for Fire)
- Lithuania
- Luxembourg (alongside 113 for Police)
- Malta
- Moldova (sole emergency number since 1 July 2018, replacing 901 for Fire, 902 for Police and 903 for Ambulance)
- Monaco (alongside 15 for Ambulance, 17 for Police and 18 for Fire)
- Montenegro (alongside 122 for Police, 123 for Fire and 124 for Ambulance)
- Netherlands (0900-8844 is the non-emergency number for any local police department) (In the Caribbean Netherlands 112 redirects to 911, whereas in the European Netherlands 911 redirects to 112)
- North Macedonia (alongside 192 for Police, 193 for Fire, 194 for Ambulance)
- Norway (112 for Police only, 110 for Fire and 113 for Ambulance. Calls to any of the emergency numbers will be redirected to appropriate service when needed. 02800 is the non-emergency number for any local police department)
- Poland (it's used alongside 999 for Ambulance, and used to be available alongside 998 for Fire, and 997 for Police; both options are available; 112 is used for all emergencies)
- Portugal (117 for reporting forest fires)
- Romania
- Russia (alongside 101 for Fire, 102 for Police, 103 for Ambulance and 104 for Emergency gas service)
- San Marino (alongside 113 and 115; 118 for Ambulance)
- Serbia (alongside 192 for Police, 193 for Fire, and 194 for Ambulance)
- Slovakia (alongside 155 for Ambulance, 158 for Police, 150 for Fire and 18300 for Mountain Rescue Service)
- Slovenia (alongside 113 for Police)
- Spain (alongside 091/062/092 for Police, 061 for Ambulance and 080 and 085 (in some provincial consortium) for Fire)
- Sweden (alongside 114 14 for police number for non-urgent matters and 1177 for medical advice, 911 and 90000 redirects to 112)
- Switzerland (alongside 117 for Police, 144 for Ambulance, 1414 for REGA air rescue and 118 for Fire)
- Turkey 112 for all emergencies (alternatively 110-fire, 155-police, 156-gendarmerie and 177 for forest fires only. 911 redirects to 112)
- Ukraine (alongside 101 for Fire, 102 for Police, 103 for Ambulance and 104 for Emergency gas service; in some cities 112 and 911 are additionally for all emergencies)
- United Kingdom (alongside 999)
- Vatican City (alongside 113 for National Police, 115 for Fire and 118 for Ambulance)

=== North America ===
- Canada (redirects to 911 on mobile phones only)
- Costa Rica (alongside 911)
- Dominican Republic (alongside 911)
- Panama (alongside 911; 104 for Police and 103 for Fire)
- United States (alongside 911, 112 forwards to 911 on GSM carriers only, including AT&T and T-Mobile)
- Mexico (alongside 911)

=== Oceania ===
- Australia (redirects to 000 from mobile phones)
- New Zealand (redirects to 111)
- Vanuatu

=== South America ===
- Argentina (alongside 911)
- Brazil (alongside 911; redirects to 190 – Military Police – alongside 193 for Fire, 190 for Military Police,100 for human rights center, 180 for woman's care and 192 for Ambulance)
- Chile (alongside 911; redirects to 133 - police)
- Colombia (Police only; alongside 123 for all emergencies, 125 for Ambulance and 119 for Fire)
- Ecuador (alongside 911)

In many countries, emergency numbers previously used also continue to be available; e.g. 061 and 112 in Spain, 999 and 112 both function in Ireland and the UK. In the United States, only some carriers, including AT&T will map the number 112 to its emergency number 911.

== Adoption ==
112 emergency telephone number logo used in Turkey

The number is also adopted by candidates for EU accession and members of the EEA agreement.

The International Telecommunication Union recommends that member states selecting a primary or secondary emergency number choose either 911, 112 or both. 112 is one of two numbers (the other being the region's own emergency number) that can be dialed on most GSM phones even if the phone is locked.

=== European Union ===
112 is managed and financed in the European Union by each member state, which also decide on the organization of the emergency call centres.

==== EU legislation ====
Adopted in July 1991, the Council Decision 91/396/EC introduced ‘112’ as the European emergency number. The Open Network Provision Directive in 1998, the Universal Service Directives in 2002 and 2009 and finally the European Electronic Communications Code in 2018 further specified how 112 should work in the European Union. By the European Electronic Communications Code, everyone in the European Union should be able to contact the emergency services by using the European emergency number ‘112’ free of charge wherever they are in the European Union. Member States are also required to make sure that access to the emergency services for people with disabilities is equivalent to that enjoyed by other end-users.

==== E112 ====
E112 is a location-enhanced version of 112. This obligation was strengthened with the European Electronic Communications Code in 2018 which requires the location to include both network-based and handset-derived location information. It is now possible for emergency services to retrieve accurate location information of the caller with the Advanced Mobile Location technology. The eCall feature for automated emergency calls on crash, mandatory on European cars since April 2018, is based on E112.

==== Reverse 112 ====
Reverse 1-1-2 is a public safety communications technology used by public safety organizations throughout the world to communicate with groups of people in a defined geographic area. Reverse 112 allows authorities to rapidly warn those in danger, directly through their mobile phones. Article 110 of the European Electronic Communications Code makes it mandatory for all Member States of the European Union to deploy, by June 2022, a system that enables public authorities to immediately warn all the people present in a determined area of an ongoing or developing threat directly on their mobile phones. This objective can be achieved with either the Cell Broadcast or the Location-based SMS technology.

==== European 112 Day ====
The European Parliament, the Council of the European Union and the European Commission signed a tripartite convention in 2009 in order to introduce an annual European 112 Day. It is supposed to raise awareness for the Europe-wide availability and the advantages of the European emergency call 112. They chose 11 February since the date includes the telephone number (11/2). A wide variety of events take place around Europe every year to celebrate European 112 Day.

==== Expert Groups on 112 ====
Getting 112 to work across the EU is a complex task. It requires in particular coordination between civil protection administrations (the emergency authorities who handle the call) and electronic communications administrations (who have to make sure that a 112 call reaches the emergency operator). That is why the European Commission decided to act at European level and set up the Expert Group on Emergency Access (EGEA) at the end of 2005. The group met for the last time in May 2013.

In 2020, the European Commission set up the Expert Group on Emergency Communications (EG112) with the task to assist the European Commission in the preparation of new legislations on the matter and exchange views on how emergency communications are handled within the European Union.

== See also ==
- ECall
- Emergency phone number
- Emergency telephone
- In case of emergency (ICE) entry in the mobile phone book
- International Mobile Satellite Organization
- Single Non-Emergency Number
