= Zapceń =

- Village
- Location within Poland
- Coordinates: 53°59′32″N 17°28′35″E
- Country: Poland
- Voivodeship: Pomeranian
- County: Bytów
- Gmina: Lipnica
- Population: 205

Zapceń [ˈzapt͡sɛɲ] (Kashubian: Zôpceń) is a village in Gmina Lipnica, Bytów County, Pomeranian Voivodeship, in northern Poland.

From 1975 to 1998 the village was in Słupsk Voivodeship.

It had a population of 205.
