= Battle of Pont-Charrault =

Battle occurred during the War in the Vendée

- Part of War in the Vendée
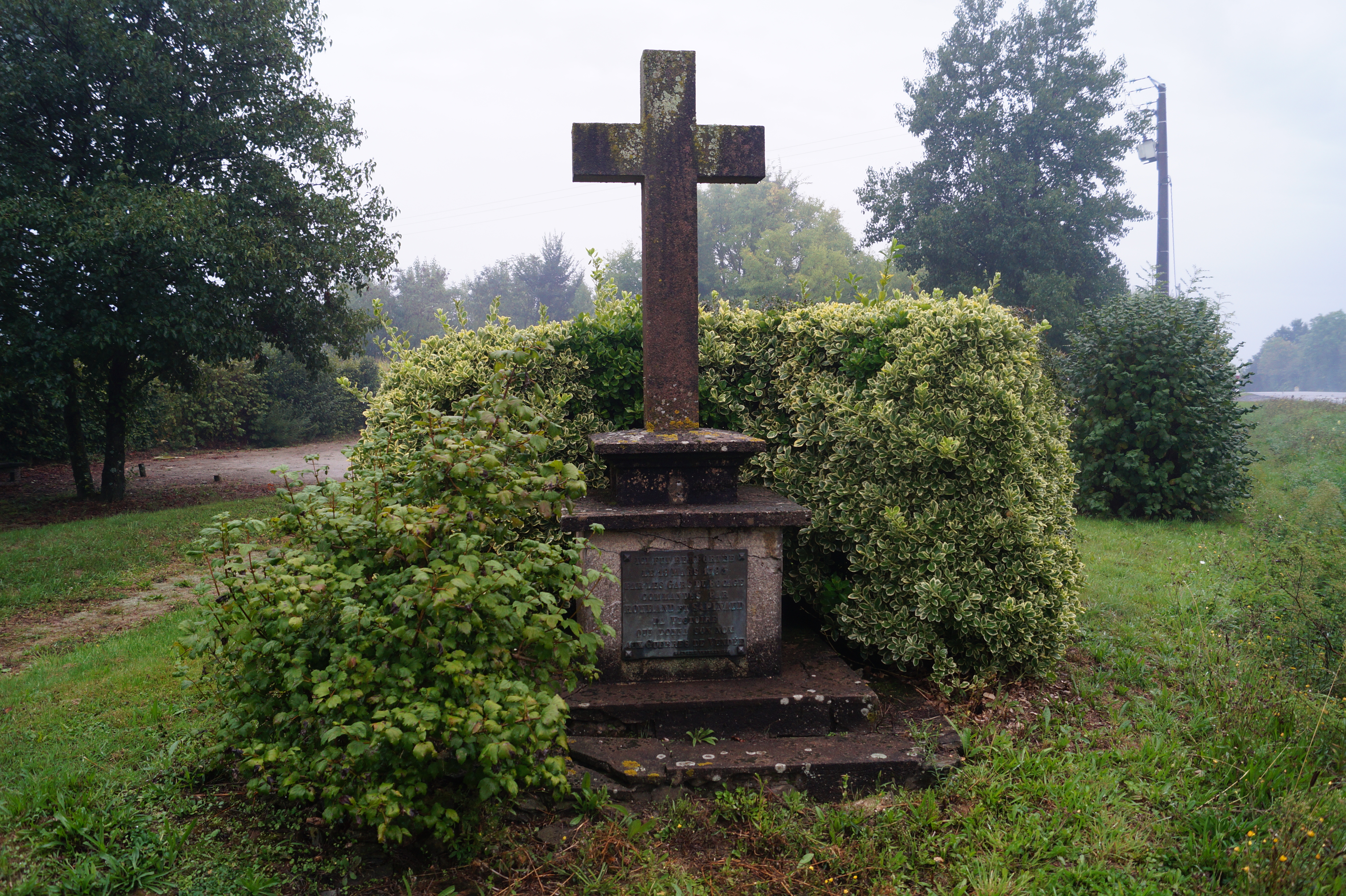
- View in 2015 of the commemorative cross erected by the Souvenir vendéen in L'Oie in 1949.
Date	March 19, 1793
Location	Mouchamps, Saint-Vincent-Sterlanges and L'Oie 46°45′50.3″N 1°06′18″W
Result	Vendéean victory

Belligerents
(France) French Republic	Vendeans

Commanders and leaders
• Louis de Marcé • Henri de Boulard • Esprit Baudry d'Asson • Joseph Niou • Narcisse Trullard	• Charles de Royrand • Louis Sapinaud de La Verrie • Charles Sapinaud de La Rairie • Jacques Alexis de Verteuil • Auguste de Béjarry • Amédée de Béjarry • Gabriel Baudry d'Asson • Mathieu de Verteuil • Aimé de Vaugirard • Charles-François de Chouppes • William Bulkeley • Céleste Bulkeley

Strength
2,300 men 8 cannons	5,000 to 6,000 men

Casualties and losses
300 to 500 deaths 200 to 300 prisoners 1 cannon captured	250 deaths
- Location within France

The Battle of Pont-Charrault, also called the Battle of Gravereau Bridge or the Battle of La Guérinière, occurred on March 19, 1793, at the outset of the War in the Vendée. The Vendéen insurgents, led by Charles de Royrand, were pitted against a Republican column commanded by General Louis de Marcé.

The battle, which occurred in the Guérinière valley, near the Gravereau and Basse-Rivière bridges, between the communes of L'Oie and Saint-Vincent-Sterlanges, is known in historiography as the "Battle of Pont-Charrault." This designation is due to inaccuracies in initial Republican reports.

The Republican troops, dispatched from Rochefort and La Rochelle to suppress the uprising, encountered significant impediments at this location due to the destruction of both bridges. They were further disadvantaged by an unexpected insurgent attack at nightfall. After three hours of sustained combat, the patriots were compelled to retreat in disorder towards La Rochelle, leaving several hundred men on the battlefield.

On this day, the peasant insurgents protesting against mass conscription inflicted the most significant defeat on the Republicans since the inception of the revolt. The news reached Paris and caused considerable astonishment among the deputies of the National Convention, who perceived themselves to be confronting a vast conspiracy. Accused of treason, General Marcé was sentenced to death by the Revolutionary Tribunal and subsequently executed by guillotine in Paris.

The repercussions of this battle, which took place in the Vendée department, were so significant that the uprising in the West subsequently became known as the "War in the Vendée." Additionally, the rebels from the various insurgent departments began to be collectively referred to as "Vendéens."

== Prelude ==
In the opening days of March 1793, the introduction of universal conscription gave rise to a series of insurrections across a dozen departments in western France. In the eastern portion of the Vendée department, the insurrection commenced with the capture of Tiffauges and the disarmament of its National Guard on March 12. On the 13th, the insurgents proceeded to seize Les Herbiers and Montaigu, where they perpetrated the massacre of approximately 50 to 60 National Guardsmen and patriotic administrators. On the same day, the National Guard of Fontenay-le-Comte was decisively defeated at the Quatre-chemins crossroads, in L'Oie, south of Saint-Fulgent, and subsequently withdrew to Sainte-Hermine, resulting in the deaths of between 25 and 30 individuals. The peasantry rapidly selected members of the nobility as their leaders, largely due to their extensive military experience. Prominent figures included Charles de Royrand, Louis Sapinaud de La Verrie, and Charles Sapinaud de La Rairie. However, many demonstrated minimal enthusiasm for an insurrection they perceived futile and were compelled to participate.

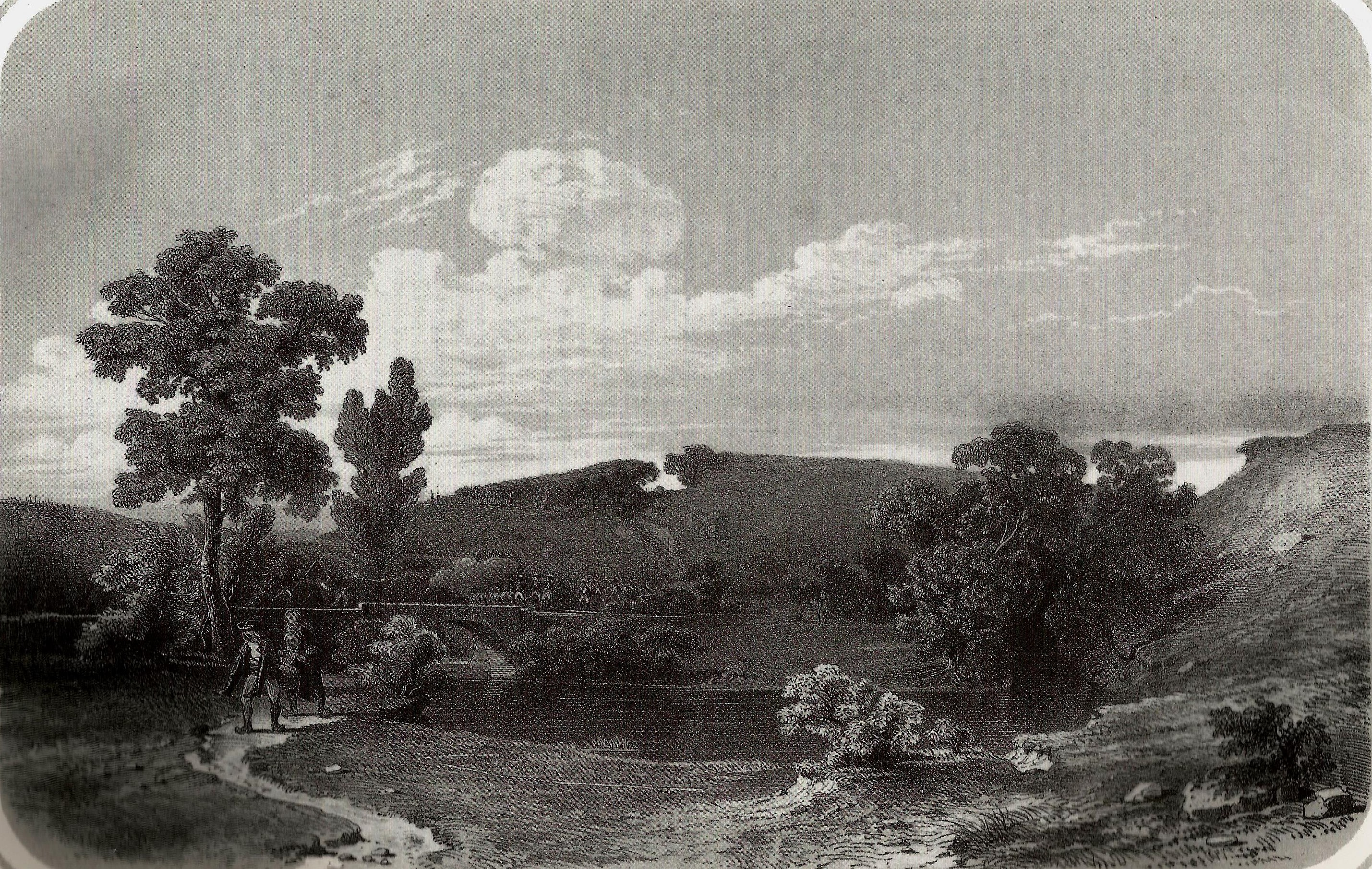
Le Pont-Charron, engraving by Thomas Drake, circa 1850.

In La Rochelle, located to the south of the insurgent-controlled territory, the 12th military division was under the command of Division General Marc-Antoine Malleret de Verteuil, who was assisted by Colonels Henri de Boulard and Esprit Baudry d'Asson. In response to a request for assistance from the districts of Sables-d'Olonne and Challans, Verteuil announced the deployment of reinforcements on March 12. On March 13, Division General Louis de Marcé arrived in La Rochelle with 900 men gathered in Rochefort. Verteuil initially appeared to intend to assist Les Sables. However, during the night of March 13–14, he received a letter from Sainte-Hermine that indicated the route to Nantes was obstructed by approximately 10,000 rebels and that the bridges north of Chantonnay had been destroyed. The initial objective was subsequently modified at the request or with the agreement of the representative on mission Joseph Niou. On March 14, General Marcé departed from La Rochelle with a column of 1,100 to 1,200 men and four cannons, embarking on the road to Nantes.

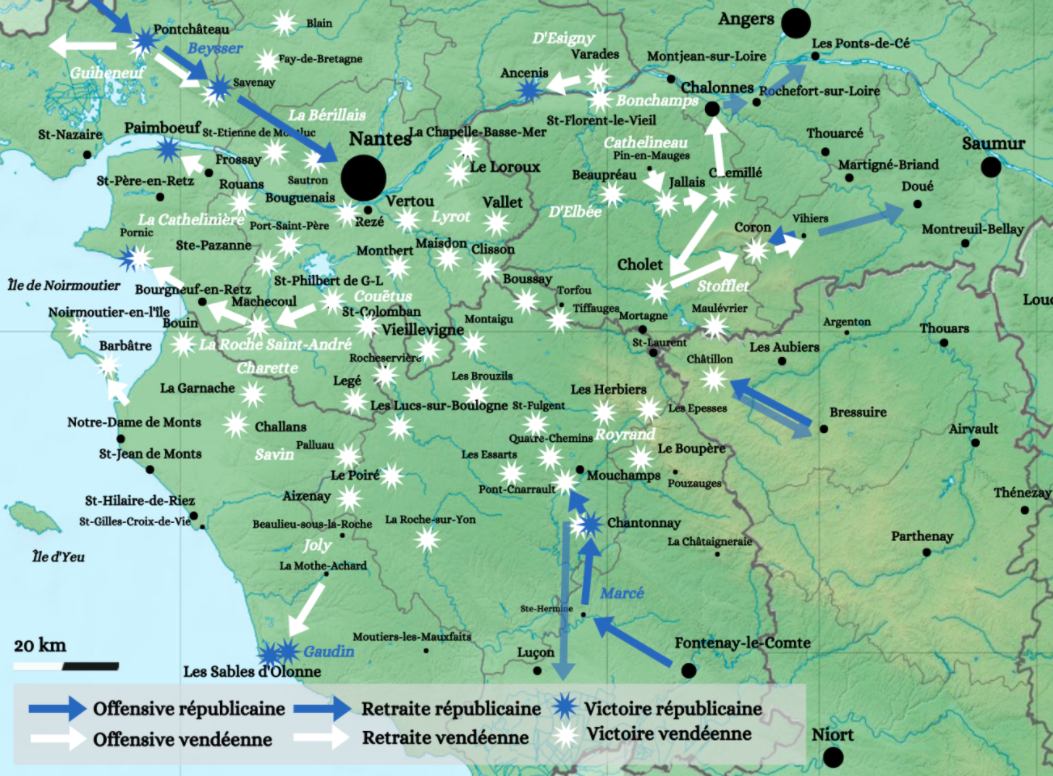
Map of the Vendée insurrection in March 1793.

On March 15, the insurgents succeeded in capturing Chantonnay after a prolonged engagement with the National Guards of Fontenay. On the 16th, Marcé arrived in Sainte-Hermine. On the 17th, he recaptured the village of Chantonnay with a vanguard of 500 men. The Vendéens then retreated to L'Oie, leaving behind 40 dead and three cannons. That same day, Marcé received reinforcements and announced his intention to continue his march to Nantes.

On March 18, the civil commission of Sainte-Hermine requisitioned horses and carts for the purpose of supplying the column with food.

== Forces present ==
=== Republican army ===
Upon its departure from La Rochelle on March 14, Marcé's column comprised over one thousand combatants. The contingent comprised 400 men from the 2nd, 3rd, and 4th battalions of Charente-Inférieure volunteers and 500 men from the Rochefort-sur-Mer National Guard, including 100 cavalrymen. Additionally, the contingent comprised 150 men from the La Rochelle National Guard, 140 from the 4th Marine Infantry Regiment, 50 from the 60th Infantry Regiment, a platoon of gendarmes, and a few gunners with four field pieces. However, the column was reinforced along the way by several hundred National Guardsmen, notably from Surgères, Chaillé-les-Marais, Luçon, Marans, and possibly from Niort and Saintes, with four cannons. The majority of the combatants were inexperienced and some were lacking ammunition. Marcé stated that he had 2,000 men when he entered insurgent territory. In his report dated March 21, Verteuil stated that he had 2,400 men at his disposal, along with nine cannons. Deschamps, the commissioner of the Deux-Sèvres department, reported 3,500 men on March 18. In their report to the National Convention, representatives on mission Niou and Trullard mentioned 2,300 men with eight cannons. This last number is cited by historians Jean-Clément Martin, Alain Gérard, Roger Dupuy, and Claudy Valin.

=== Vendéen army ===
The insurgents from the eastern part of the Vendée department were the first to adopt a military organization, establishing a precedent that was subsequently emulated by other groups. As early as March, they constituted a gathering designated the "Catholic Army" or the "Catholic-Royal Army." Charles de Royrand was appointed as the general-in-chief. Other commanders included Louis Sapinaud de La Verrie, Charles Sapinaud de La Rairie, Jean-Félix Clabat du Chillou, the brothers Auguste and Amédée de Béjarry, Gabriel Baudry d'Asson, Aimé de Vaugirard, Jacques Alexis de Verteuil, and Mathieu de Verteuil.

From March 16 to 19, a considerable number of insurgents, estimated at between 5,000 and 6,000, assembled at the L'Oie camp. They were equipped with diverse weapons, including rifles, pikes, and scythes. During this period, the bands from the La Roche-sur-Yon region, led by William Bulkeley, Céleste Bulkeley, and Charles-François de Chouppes, joined the ranks of Royrand's army.

== Course of events ==
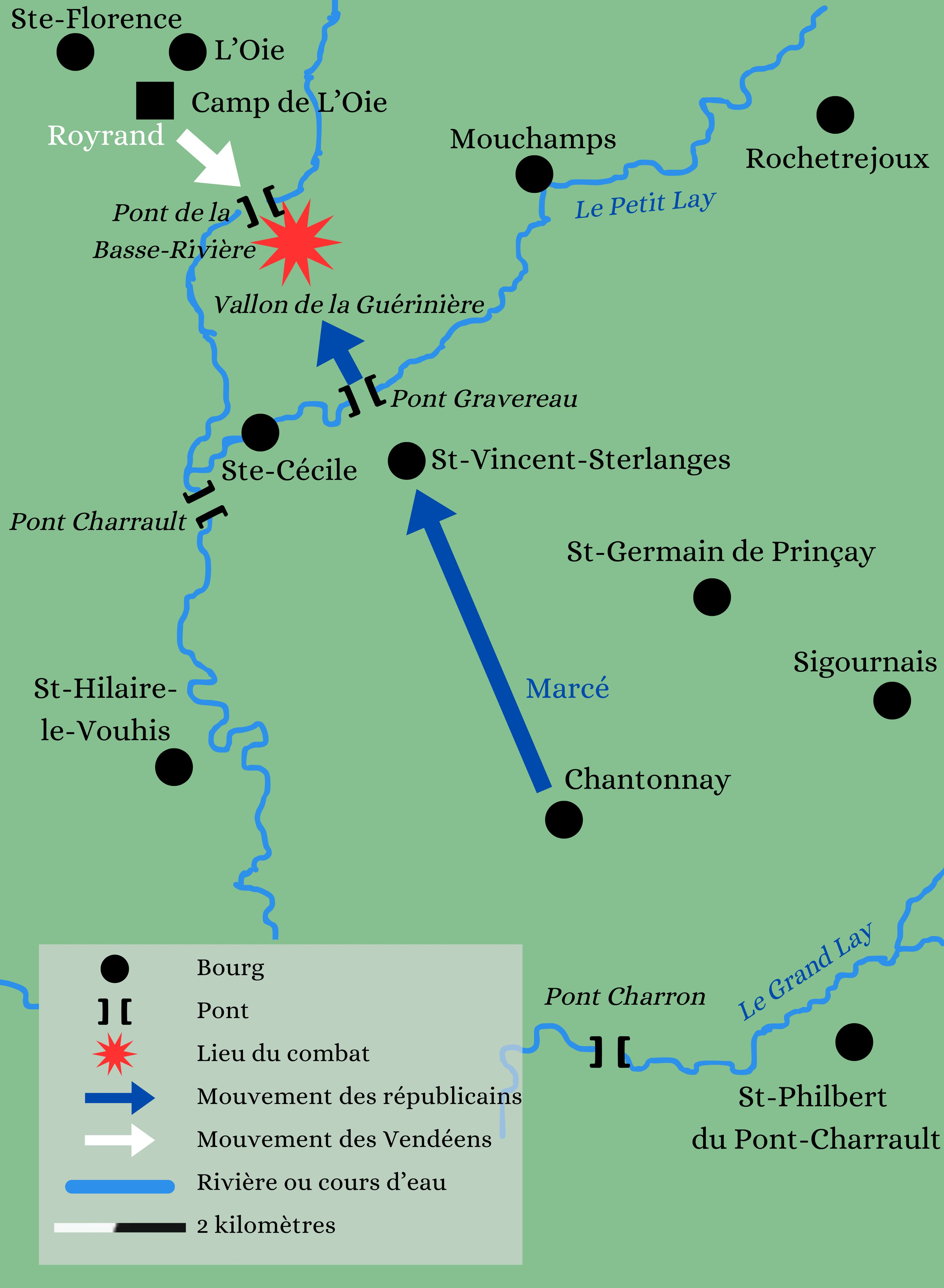
Map of the battle of Pont-Charrault.

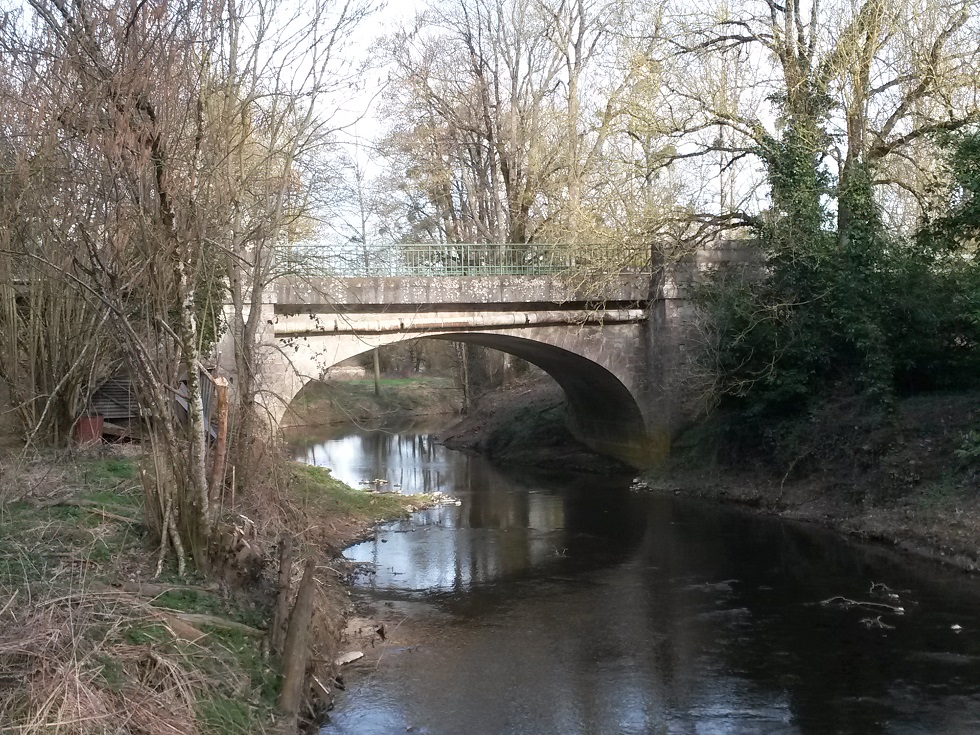
2017 view of the Gravereau bridge over the Petit Lay.

Despite the common designation of the engagement as the "Battle of Pont-Charrault," a designation that reflects an initial tendency to present inaccurate information in Republican reports, the battle occurred to the north of Saint-Vincent-Sterlanges, specifically within the confines of the Guérinière valley. The precise location of the battle was situated between two bridges: the Gravereau Bridge, to the south along the Petit Lay; and the Basse-Rivière Bridge, to the north along the Vendronneau.

On March 19, the Republican forces initiated their advance, only to encounter the Gravereau Bridge obstructed and impassable. At 7 am, the 200 men of the vanguard, stationed at Saint-Vincent-Sterlanges, commenced efforts to restore the passageway under the direction of Adjutant General Frésat. At 12:30 pm, Marcé departed from Chantonnay with most of his troops. Representatives Niou and Trullard accompanied him. The weather conditions were challenging, with low temperatures, precipitation, and strong winds. After passing Saint-Vincent-Sterlanges, Marcé reunited with his vanguard at approximately 2 pm. However, upon crossing the Gravereau Bridge, the Republicans discovered that the Basse-Rivière Bridge had also been obstructed. While awaiting the necessary repairs, the soldiers proceeded in a line through the Guérinière valley.

At approximately 3 or 4 pm, as repairs on the second bridge were nearing completion, a group was observed in the northern vicinity of Saint-Fulgent. The Republicans were indecisive. Some troops suspected an enemy attack, while others believed they heard the singing of the French national anthem, La Marseillaise, and thought reinforcements were arriving from Nantes. In response to orders from the representatives, a trumpet and one or two aides-de-camp were dispatched to investigate. Two additional hours elapsed without any discernible action. Marcé even initiated the process of establishing a camp for his troops. The emissaries subsequently returned to raise the alarm, but it was already too late. The Vendéens had gained the upper hand and initiated an attack. The lyrics being sung were those of the La Marseillaise des Blancs.

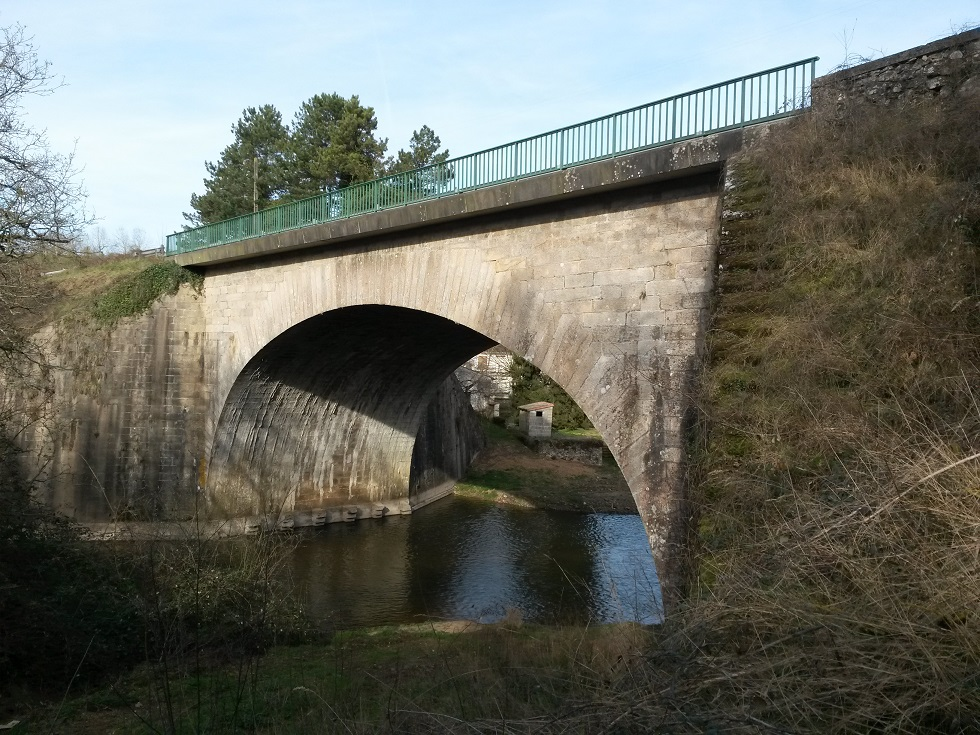
View from Pont-Charron, on the Grand Lay, in 2017.

The engagement commenced at approximately 6 or 7 pm, shortly before nightfall. The Vendéens assumed positions in the woods and on the heights, from which they opened fire. After the initial volleys, the fighting transitioned into close combat. On the left wing, the National Guardsmen exhibited signs of panic, which rapidly disseminated throughout the entire army. According to Colonel Henri de Boulard, the battalions "were so panicked that they perceived enemies in every direction, even in the absence of any actual adversaries." (Note: Then, there was no longer any doubt that it was the army of the Brigands. Based on this, Marcé ordered the completion of the bridge, which was done. But since this uncertainty had taken up almost two hours, the enemies took advantage of the moment to slip troops by their right and left, hidden behind hedges. Marcé realized it was too late to continue the march. He shared with the deponent his intention to preserve the two restored bridges, keeping the troops bivouacked at the second one, and taking additional precautions for the night, such as positioning battalions on the right and left wings of the column, a strong detachment near the second bridge, a rear guard at the first bridge, and near Saint-Vincent, another detachment capable of holding the position and preventing the enemy from attempting to cut it off. According to these orders, the deponent moved to the left wing of the column with Citizen Touron; they together recognized the place where a battalion should be positioned. They returned to the head of the column to find it, and Citizen Touron was to lead it there. At that moment, the enemy's gunfire began at the head of the column, towards the left and slightly short of the bridge, very close to the column, as the river, forming a reentrant angle, had allowed them to approach very closely and even extend all along this flank. Marcé suddenly changed his plans. Seeing himself attacked, he moved some battalions to the left flank of the column to line the hedges of a small plateau that overlooked the enemy's position. One of these battalions, composed almost entirely of country folk, and still distant from the enemy's fire, fired a volley almost into the air, without seeing anyone, and then fled without being able to rally, despite all efforts to do so. The deponent heard the cry of 'every man for himself!' within this same battalion. Moments later, General Marcé ordered two battalions to the right flank. Some other battalions in the column followed the example of the one that had fled. The deponent asserts that they had lost their heads so completely that they saw enemies wherever there were none. He confronted one of these battalions, which seemed about to fire; having looked at the object in front of them and seeing nothing, he said: 'Soldiers, don't shoot! There are no enemies!' And at that moment, without listening to him, they fired into the air, as the deponent, who was on horseback in front of the first rank, was not injured. This battalion also fled, and it was equally impossible to rally it. The deponent, returning to the head of the column, tried to reassure other battalions. He passed behind the one next to him, giving the same exhortation to the soldiers that he had given to the previous battalion; it was useless, they broke ranks, and the deponent was thrown into a ditch with his horse; he managed to get out through great effort. Finally, seeing that he could not restore the soldiers' morale, he returned to the head of the column to try to gather the fugitives after crossing the first bridge; this was attempted in vain. The deponent tried again to rally them beyond the village of Saint-Vincent; this was no more successful. He attempted to rally them on the ground where the affair of the 17th took place; again, in vain. He pushed on to the village of Chantonnay; this was no more successful. He pushed on to the Charrault Bridge, hoping that, being farther from the enemy, the soldiers would regain their calm, which did not happen. As all these different attempts had been made in concert with Marcé, the deponent proceeded to Saint-Hermand, where finally the troops, exhausted by the seven leagues they had just run, stopped. It was then three-thirty in the morning on Wednesday the 20th of this month. — Deposition of Henri de Boulard before the commissioners of the district and the commune of La Rochelle, March 22, 1793) After three hours of combat, the Republicans were completely routed.

The fugitives traversed the municipalities of Saint-Vincent-Sterlanges and Chantonnay, subsequently reaching Sainte-Hermine between 3 and 4 am. There, representatives Niou and Trullard were joined by their colleagues Pierre-Jean-Baptiste Auguis and Jean-Louis Carra, who had proceeded from Fontenay-le-Comte. Marcé arrived in Sainte-Hermine at 6 a.m. and was promptly dismissed by the representatives on mission. The officers were unable to rally their men, and the flight resumed the following morning, only stopping at La Rochelle. The first fugitives reached the city on March 20 at 5 am. The four representatives on mission arrived at approximately 8 or 9 pm. Marcé followed shortly after and was among the last to return. Other soldiers retreated to Niort.

== Losses ==
The precise number of human casualties is uncertain, as no official record was kept and the death registers of the municipalities within the combat zone have been lost. On the Republican side, Deputy Jean-Baptiste Martineau reported 300 deaths in a letter dated March 21 and addressed to his colleague, Jean-François Goupilleau, a deputy to the National Convention. (Note: The second time, we were routed at L'Oie, nearly 4,000 men against nearly 8,000 brigands, entrenched behind woods and hedges, due to the ineptitude or treason of General Marcé. The battle took place at six o'clock in the evening. Now judge: it lasted nearly three hours. We lost around 300 brave men in this last affair. I am assured that our side killed more than half of them. The position was unfavorable, and the darkness was thick. We may well have killed nearly 800 brigands since we started fighting. Some leaders have perished. — Letter from the substitute deputy Jean-Baptiste Martineau, written in Fontenay-le-Comte, March 21, 1793) Amédée de Béjarry, relying on the notes of his grandfather Amédée-François-Paul de Béjarry, posits a toll of 400 to 500 dead and 200 to 300 prisoners. In their respective historical accounts, Auguste Billaud, Yves Gras, and Émile Gabory cite a figure of 500 dead. Additionally, the Republicans left behind a cannon, a considerable quantity of rifles, 2,400 cartridges, and a thousand pounds of gunpowder in the hands of the insurgents.

In contrast to the relatively low number of casualties reported by Amédée de Béjarry, which he attributes to the statements of an insurgent leader, Dominique Ussault, the figures provided by Deputy Martineau are considerably higher. Martineau's account suggests that the insurgents sustained losses amounting to more than half of their total strength. However, the historian Yves Gras offers a figure of 250 dead, which is considerably higher than the other estimates.

== Consequences ==
=== Massacres in La Rochelle ===
In La Rochelle, the announcement of the defeat caused a general sense of astonishment among the population, and a pervasive fear of "brigands" emerged. On March 21, four priests (Note: Christophe Violleau, Charles Cornuault, Jean Ogeard, and Louis Hullé, respectively curates of La Chapelle-Gaudin, Noirterre, Noirlieu, and Largeasse, all in their sixties.) who had been imprisoned since October 1792 for refusing to comply with the orders of the French Revolution were removed from the city hall prison and transferred to the Île de Ré. However, en route, they were slaughtered by a mob of 200 to 300 individuals, and their corpses were decapitated, emasculated, or dismembered. The following day, two religious men from Saint-Laurent-sur-Sèvre (Note: Jacques-Pierre Dauche, 47 years old, and André Verger, 34 years old.) were disembarked in La Rochelle by a ship from Les Sables-d'Olonne and suffered the same fate.

=== Dismissal and execution of General Marcé ===
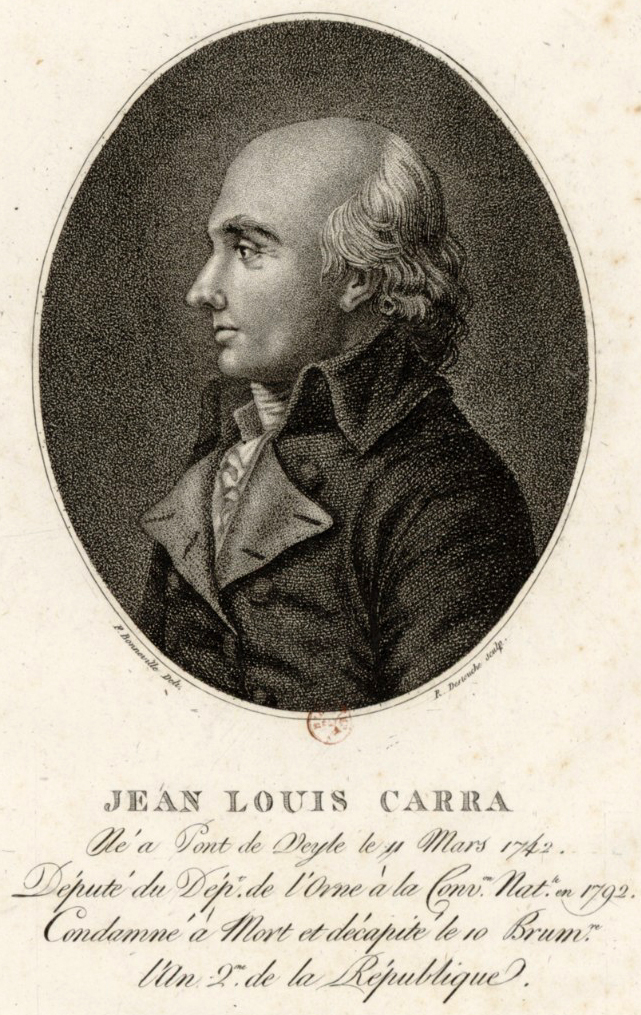
Portrait of Jean-Louis Carra, engraving by François Bonneville, 1797, Bibliothèque nationale de France.

Following his dismissal, General Marcé was apprehended on the evening of March 20 and incarcerated in the La Rochelle City Hall by the representatives on mission. He was subsequently replaced by his second-in-command, Colonel Henri de Boulard, of the 60th Infantry Regiment.

On March 21, Niou and Trullard drafted their report, attributing the defeat to General Marcé, whom they accused of inaction. In the aforementioned report, Niou asserted that he had advised Marcé to vacate the position held by the Republicans before the Vendéens' assault. However, the account presented by the representatives is contradicted by that of Boulard. In his report, dated March 21 and addressed to the Minister of War, as well as in his deposition before the commissioners of the district and municipality of La Rochelle on March 22, Boulard stated that the representative on the mission had believed in the imminent arrival of patriot reinforcements and had forbidden firing. (Note: At four o'clock, the entire army [...] found itself between the two bridges, formed in a column, and several people who had examined the location on which it stood found it extremely dangerous; for it was a path dominated by heights, covered with thick woods, and bounded at its ends by two small rivers, whose bridges had to be guarded. Based on these considerations, and the day being too far advanced, Citizen Niou, by order of the Commission following the army, proposed to withdraw it above Saint-Vincent, where the country was flatter and more open; the general did not think it appropriate to follow this advice. An hour later, that is, around five o'clock, the enemy was announced, and indeed, it appeared, forming a large column that filled the path, on a height of thick woods, located about two leagues from the second bridge. The retreat was made to the plain of Saint-Vincent, where the entire strength of the army could be deployed, and the artillery directed, was proposed in vain by Citizen Niou to General Marcé. The rebels did not move, and someone believed that the gathering seen might be the national troops expected from Nantes. Based on this, the general decided to send a trumpeter and two aides-de-camp towards them, who soon returned, having been pursued by several horsemen. No longer doubting that the men on the height were the rebel army, some cannon shots were fired at them, but they caused no harm, as they were out of range; however, it was noticed that the column was slipping into the woods and that the army could be enveloped. The general had already been urged, since he insisted on holding his bad position, to at least make defensive arrangements; he limited himself to sending some skirmishers into the woods. Niou warned the general again of the necessity of taking measures, but he remained inactive, and it was only when the rebels' cries announced their proximity that the general ordered strong detachments to be sent into two adjacent clearings to cover his flanks. This movement, made hastily, caused disorder and concern. Finally, the rebels attacked with gunfire, to which our detachments responded. — Report of the representatives on mission Niou and Trullard addressed to the National Convention, March 21, 1793. Around two o'clock in the afternoon, the entire army having reunited, they marched towards the second bridge; upon arrival at this location, they began to rebuild it, which, according to the surveyor-engineer, could take about three-quarters of an hour; the bridge being nearly completed, the enemy appeared on the crest of the opposite mountain and the main road leading to Saint-Fulgent. General Marcé ordered the work to be stopped and fired two 8-caliber cannon shots at the enemy column, which appeared to be 1,000 to 1,200 toises away from the army's position. Commissioner Niou, having arrived, disapproved of this hostility, saying that if he had been there, he would not have allowed the shots to be fired, being very convinced, based on what he had just heard from various people in the column, that the troops facing the Republican army were not brigands, but rather the Nantes legion coming to join their brothers in arms. The deponent observed to him that, having been in the presence of the brigands for two days, he could recognize their vedettes; however, he asked him if he had any information that this reunion was supposed to take place. He replied that he did not. Nevertheless, the said commissioner insisted on his belief, based on his conviction of hearing the cherished cry of every good Republican pronounced by the troops who were the subject of the discussion. In this uncertainty, someone proposed sending an officer, accompanied by a trumpeter, to reconnoiter. It was ordered that aide-de-camp Dardillouze should go very slowly, to announce his mission from afar. When he was within a hundred paces of the enemy troops, he sounded a fanfare; at this signal, two horsemen and some foot soldiers came running towards them. Fearing they might be detained, they prudently withdrew to a greater distance; this they did very swiftly. They stopped again, and seeing they were not pursued, they returned, hoping to obtain a parley; but they received only a general cry of 'Long live the King! Long live the clergy!' They returned to report on their mission. Then, there was no longer any doubt that it was the army of the Brigands. — Deposition of Henri de Boulard before the commissioners of the district and the commune of La Rochelle, March 22, 1793. When asked why he had not taken the necessary precautions to ascertain the presence of the enemy, which often led the army to doubt, making it believe that instead of the enemy, it might have been the army from Nantes; this doubt caused delays that allowed the enemy time to ambush in the woods, He replied that this doubt is precisely what frustrated him the most, as he, being the general, was very convinced that it was the rebel army occupying the heights opposite the bridge that was being repaired, and where the general and Commissioner Niou only arrived at three o'clock in the afternoon; that Colonel Boulard shared the same opinion, but that Commissioner Niou and the majority of the army were convinced that it could be the army from Nantes. A lot of time was lost deliberating and trying to identify the troops in front of us, and we were forced to engage in combat from the position we were in. When it was pointed out to him that since he was certain it was the enemy, it was unnecessary to send someone to identify them, He replied that this was his opinion as the general and Colonel Boulard's as well, but that this opinion was counterbalanced and even dismissed by that of the National Commissioner, whose advice he, as the general, had to respect and even follow without objection. — Excerpt from the interrogation of General Marcé by Judge Antonin Roussillon, in the presence of Public Prosecutor Fouquier-Tinville, on July 26, 1793.) General Marcé provided a similar account during his interrogation.

Niou and Trullard merely alluded to a "strange and cruel" defeat, whereas the representatives Auguis and Carra elaborated further. Having observed the troops' defeat in Sainte-Hermine, they accused Marcé of "the most cowardly incompetence" or "the most cowardly treason." Furthermore, they had his eldest son, aged 18, arrested, citing compelling evidence that both were complicit in the Marquis de La Rouërie's plot. Ultimately, on April 6, Auguis and Carra drew a parallel with General Dumouriez's betrayal in Belgium following the Battle of Neerwinden. They recalled that Dumouriez had served as a field marshal in Vendée in 1791 and 1792, concluding that "the treason of the former General Marcé at Saint-Vincent on the 19th of last month occurred on the same day, the 19th, as the treason of the infamous Dumouriez at Neerwinden." [...] Therefore, it can be concluded with certainty that there was a general plot and that Marcé and Dumouriez were in agreement.

In the context of mounting suspicion towards aristocrats, Auguis and Carra, upon learning that one of the insurgent leaders was named Verteuil, posited that he must be the son of Marc-Antoine Malleret de Verteuil, the commander-in-chief of La Rochelle. They also contemplated dismissing him. However, the relationship between the Republican general and the insurgent leader proved to be quite distant, and Verteuil remained in his position for another three months.

The news of the Pont-Charrault rout reached Paris on March 23, eliciting shock among the deputies of the National Convention. They found the defeat of regular troops at the hands of peasants incomprehensible and could only offer an explanation that invoked treason. The Montagnards exploited the opportunity to accuse the Girondins of moderation and incompetence. Girondin deputy Lecointe-Puyraveau advanced the hypothesis of an English conspiracy. Tallien, a member of the Montagnard faction, asserted that Marcé could only be "a fool or a traitor." Barère petitioned for the convening of a court-martial in La Rochelle to try Marcé, but Robespierre interceded, urging instead that the general be tried in Paris before the Revolutionary Tribunal. On May 11, the Society of Friends of Liberty and Equality of La Rochelle also submitted a formal complaint to the Revolutionary Tribunal in Paris. The document accused Marcé of "sacrificing the troops of the Republic" and demanded that he be tried for treason. It further stated that, two months after his actions, Marcé was still at large and that the Revolutionary Tribunal must take action. The document concluded by expressing hope that Marcé would be punished severely, in the interest of the Revolution and national justice.

Marcé was incarcerated in May at the Abbaye prison. He was brought before the Revolutionary Tribunal on July 26, 1793, and put on trial on January 28, 1794. The general attempted to justify his actions by claiming that the defeat was merely the unfortunate consequence of a battalion's panic. However, in his indictment, Fouquier-Tinville accused the general of "wickedly and deliberately betraying the interests of the Republic [...] by favoring the progress of the brigands' arms on his territory." In its judgment, the tribunal accused Marcé of treason, negligence, and unworthiness. It reproached the officer for failing to order a necessary retreat for abandoning the troops in disarray and exposed artillery through a cowardly and criminal flight. This resulted in the Republic losing brave defenders and providing the rebels with huge progress. Marcé was condemned to death and subsequently guillotined on January 29, 1794.

The hypothesis in question lacks historical support. Accordingly, Jean-Clément Martin posits that the failure of Marcé can be attributed to the mediocrity of the revolutionaries' military resources and their lack of resolve. The region spanning Nantes to La Rochelle had a limited number of regular troops at its disposal. The preoccupation with the potential of an English landing on the coastline necessitated the continuous deployment of troops in the ports and islands that dominated the coastline.

=== Beginning of the "War in the Vendée" ===
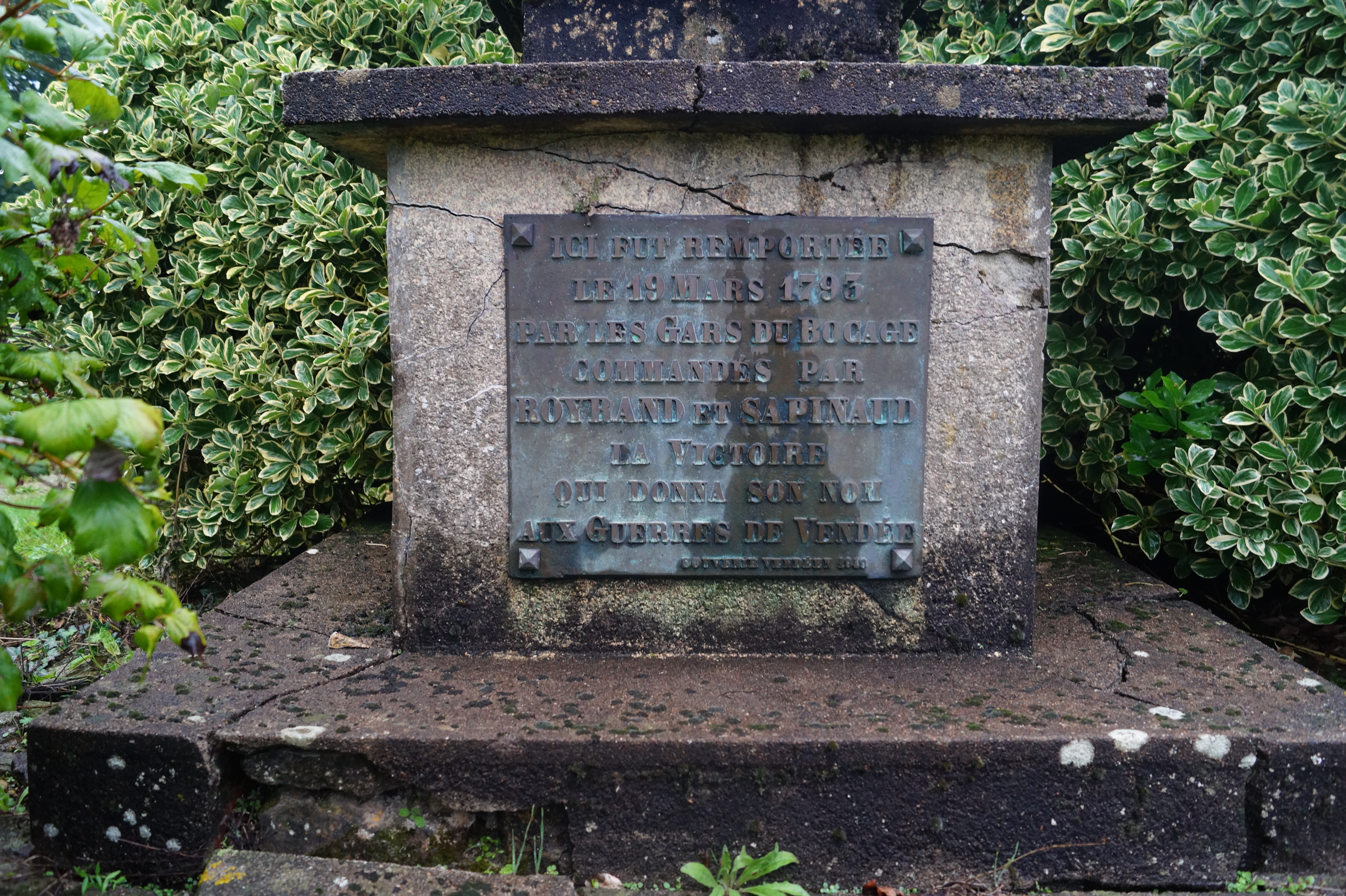
View in 2015 of the plaque beneath the commemorative cross erected at L'Oie by the Souvenir vendéen.

In the early days of April 1793, the Republican forces could successfully suppress the insurrection that had been occurring in the regions of Brittany and Maine. Nevertheless, the insurgents retained control of a region encompassing the southern portion of the Loire-Inférieure department, the southwestern section of the Maine-et-Loire department, the northwestern region of the Deux-Sèvres department, and the northern zone of the Vendée department. This territory is historically designated as the "Military Vendée," a term used to differentiate it from the department.

Following the Battle of Pont-Charrault, which took place in the Vendée department, all insurgents from the West were collectively designated as "Vendéens," and the conflict became known as the "War in the Vendée," even though the insurrection involved numerous other departments. In the view of the historian Jean-Clément Martin, the designation 'Vendée' was born from the characterization of the conflict as a 'war' following the battle lost on March 19, 1793, situated in the Vendée department. Following this battle, the designation "rebels of the Vendée department and neighboring areas" gained traction in subsequent discussions, ascribing responsibility for the civil war to the Vendée alone, or more specifically, to its administrators, who were deemed incapable. The designation "War in the Vendée" is rooted in this interpretation, which was accepted by the administrators of the surrounding departments. These administrators could thereby emphasize their republican credentials. In July and August 1793, the patriot inhabitants of the Vendée department petitioned the Convention to alter the designation of the war, thereby avoiding the stigmatization of their region. This plea was ultimately unsuccessful. [...] In the competition between the departments of the West to designate themselves as the most exemplary Republicans, the Deux-Sèvres department highlights its vigilance against royalist forces, as do Maine-et-Loire and Loire-Inférieure. All three departments allow the war to be called "of Vendée." Despite the displeasure of their administrators, the Vendée was transformed in a matter of days into a hotbed of subversion, further exacerbated by its association with counter-revolutionary plots.

== Bibliography ==
- de Béjarry, Amédée (1884). Souvenirs vendéens (in French). Émile Grimaud. Archived from the original on June 29, 2022.
- Chassin, Charles-Louis (1892). La préparation de la guerre de Vendée 1789–1793 (in French). Vol. III. Paris: Paul Dupont. Archived from the original on December 14, 2021.
- Dupuy, Roger (2005). Nouvelle histoire de la France contemporaine, t. 2 : La République jacobine : Terreur, guerre et gouvernement révolutionnaire, 1792–1794. Points. Histoire (in French). Paris: Éditions du Seuil. ISBN 2-02-039818-4.
- Gabory, Émile (2009). Les Guerres de Vendée (in French). Robert Laffont. ISBN 978-2221113097.
- Gérard, Alain (1993). La Vendée : 1789-1793. Époques (in French). Champ Vallon. ISBN 978-2876731608.
- Gérard, Alain (2013). Vendée : les archives de l'extermination (in French). La Roche-sur-Yon: Centre vendéen de recherches historiques. ISBN 978-2-911253-55-3.
- Gérard, Alain (1999). Par principe d'humanité... : La Terreur et la Vendée (in French). Fayard. ISBN 978-2213603995.
- Gras, Yves (1994). La Guerre de Vendée (1793-1796) (in French). Éditions Economica. ISBN 978-2717826005.
- Martin, Jean-Clément (2014). La guerre de Vendée 1793-1800. Points Histoire (in French). Paris: Éditions Points. ISBN 978-2-7578-3656-9.
- Martin, Jean-Clément (2022). Les Vendéens (in French). Paris: Presses Universitaires de France. ISBN 978-2130829676.
- Hussenet, Jacques (2007). « Détruisez la Vendée ! » Regards croisés sur les victimes et destructions de la guerre de Vendée (in French). La Roche-sur-Yon: Centre vendéen de recherches historiques. ISBN 978-2911253348.
- Savary, Jean Julien Michel (1824). Guerres des Vendéens et des Chouans contre la République (in French). Vol. I. Baudouin frères. Archived from the original on December 16, 2021.
- Valin, Claudy (2010). "La bataille inaugurale dite du "Pont Charrault". Réalité et résonnance". Histoire militaire des guerres de Vendée (in French). Éditions Economica. ISBN 978-2717858280.
