= Battle of Chantonnay (March 1793) =

1793 battle during the War in the Vendée

First Battle of Chantonnay
- Part of the War in the Vendée
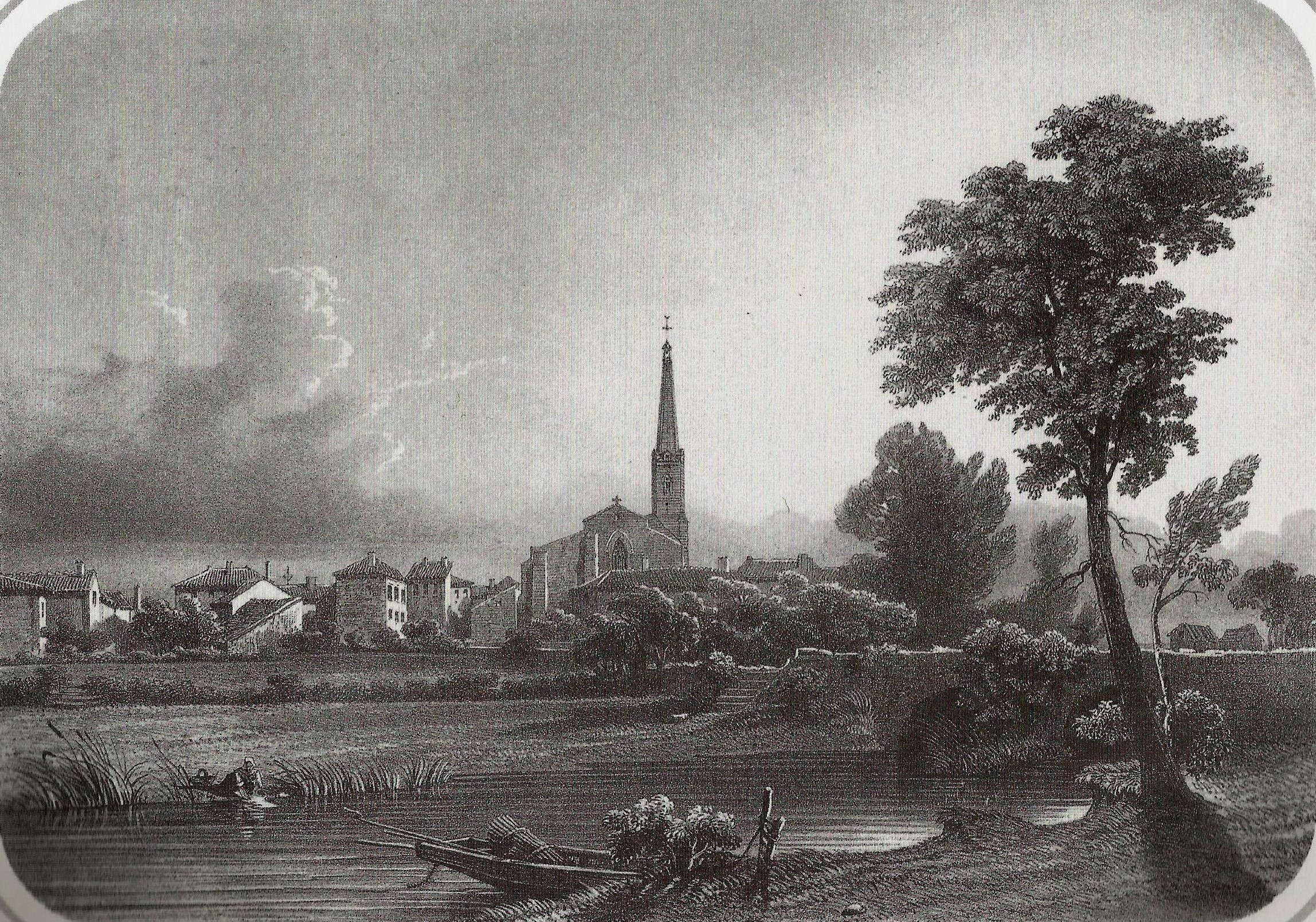
- View of Chantonnay, engraving by Thomas Drake, c. 1850.
Date	March 17, 1793
Location	Chantonnay, France 46°41′16″N 1°02′58″W
Result	Republican victory

Belligerents
French First Republic	Catholic and Royal Army

Commanders and leaders
• Louis de Marcé • Henri de Boulard • Joseph Niou	• Charles de Royrand • Louis Sapinaud de La Verrie • Charles Sapinaud de La Rairie

Strength
500 men 2 cannons	3,000 men 3 cannons

Casualties and losses
3 wounded	40 killed 3 cannons captured
- Location within France

The First Battle of Chantonnay took place on March 17, 1793, during the War in the Vendée, a counter-revolutionary uprising against the French First Republic.

== Prelude ==
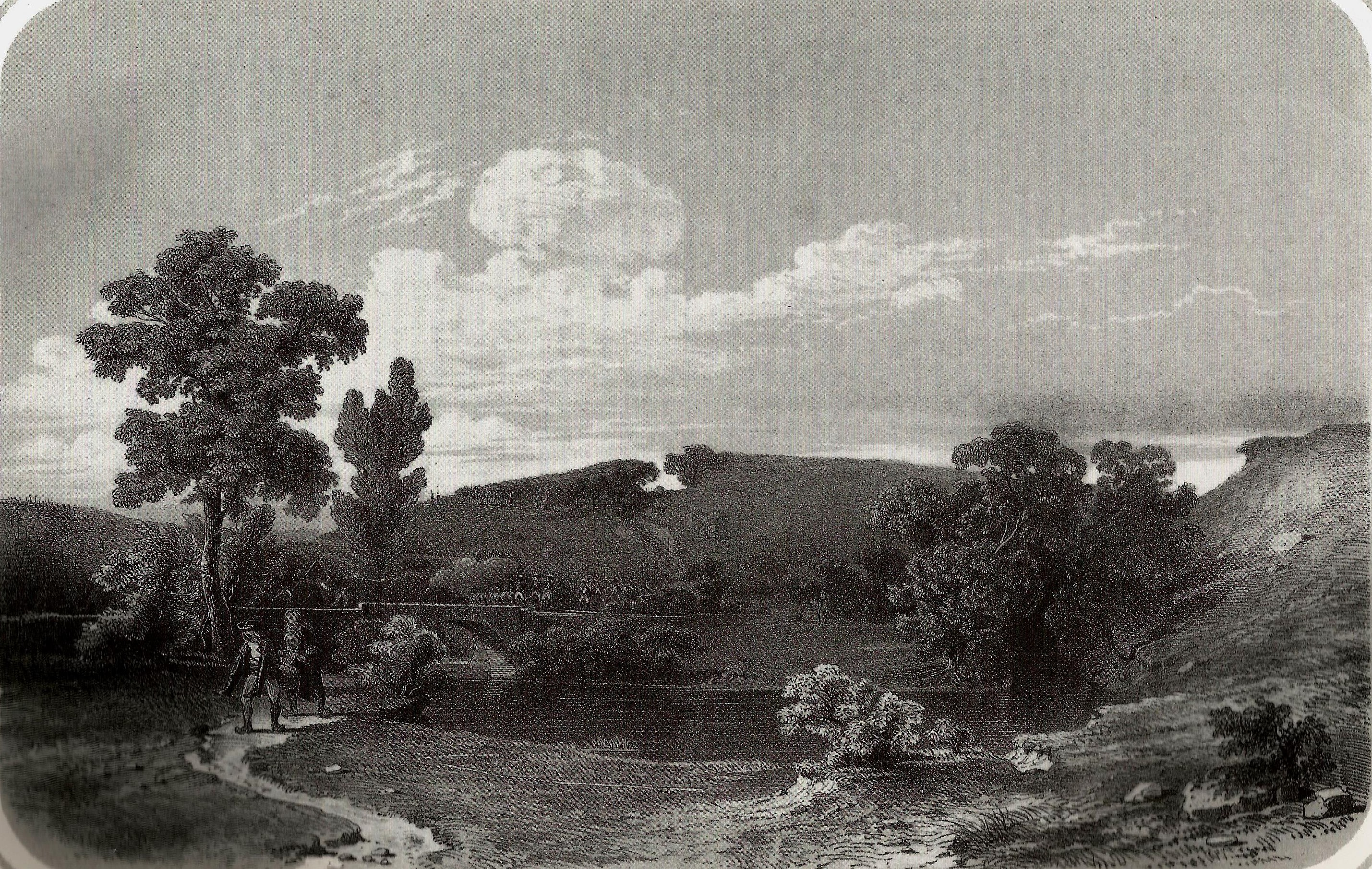
Le Pont-Charron, engraving by Thomas Drake, c. 1850.

On March 12, approximately 3,000 Vendéen insurgents, led by Charles de Royrand, Louis Sapinaud de La Verrie, and Charles Sapinaud de La Rairie, seized a strategic position at Quatre-Chemins in L'Oie, a crossroads linking Nantes to La Rochelle and Les Sables-d'Olonne to Saumur. Two days later, on March 14, the National Guard from Fontenay-le-Comte attempted to challenge their control but was ambushed and routed without a fight, suffering 25 to 30 fatalities before retreating to Sainte-Hermine. During this clash, Laparra, secretary of the Vendée department’s directory, was captured and executed by firing squad.

On March 15, the insurgents attacked Chantonnay, capturing the town after a combat with 200 National Guardsmen from Fontenay. They then withdrew slightly north to Saint-Vincent-Sterlanges.

On March 16, Republican general Louis Henri François de Marcé arrived at Sainte-Hermine from La Rochelle, commanding a force of 1,200 to 1,300 men and seven cannons. He swiftly moved to secure the Pont-Charron bridge over the Grand Lay, south of Chantonnay, to prevent its destruction by the insurgents.

== Battle ==
On March 17, the Republicans advanced toward Chantonnay. Marcé positioned a reserve force at Pont-Charron and led a vanguard of 500 men and two cannons, accompanied by Colonel Henri François Maurille de Boulard and representative Joseph Niou. The insurgents launched an attack, and a six-hour battle ensued between Chantonnay and Saint-Vincent-Sterlanges under nearly continuous rain. The Republicans secured an easy victory with their artillery overwhelming the exposed peasant insurgents on the open plain. The defeated Vendeans retreated to their camp at L'Oie.

Marcé remained in Chantonnay, where he received 1,000 reinforcements, and declared his intent to march on Nantes.

== Casualties ==
The following day, Representative Joseph Niou reported the victory to the National Convention, praising the "valor of our brothers-in-arms and the capable leadership." He claimed the rebels left over 100 of their dead on the field. However, in a report to the Minister of War, (Note: Called by circumstances to restore order in the departments of Vendée and Loire-Inférieure, I suspended my coastal inspection tour, which I had largely completed. I assembled various National Guard units from the districts of Rochefort and La Rochelle, along with some soldiers from the 60th Infantry Regiment, and marched against the rebels, who were disrupting communications with Nantes and had gathered at Saint-Vincent-Sterlanges, a village one league from here. They advanced daily toward Chantonnay and as far as Pont-Charrault. I engaged them with a vanguard of 500 men and two cannons, encountering the rebels near Chantonnay’s gates. We fought and dispersed them; they lost three small cannons that formed their artillery. Their dead and wounded are considerable in number. We suffered no fatalities; two officers and one National Guard cavalryman were lightly wounded. This action unfolded in the presence of National Commissioner Niou, whose example and counsel greatly contributed to our success. The enemy attacked first, which spurred renewed vigor in the Republic’s troops. I cannot praise enough the courageous and steadfast conduct of the National and line troops, who marched and fought for six hours under near-constant rain. Tomorrow, I march on Saint-Fulgent with 2,000 men. We must repair all bridges along our route; the weather remains rainy, and we lack shoes, but the Republic’s soldiers will overcome all obstacles in this fanatical region and, I hope, restore the tree of liberty, bringing happiness to a misguided people. I will report further on this operation, General Minister. Colonel Boulard assists me in this advance; he commands only 60 men of the 60th Regiment but I have appointed him chief of staff of our small army. He played a significant role yesterday and today leads the vanguard toward Saint-Fulgent. — General Louis de Marcé, March 18, 1793 Report to War Minister Pierre Riel de Beurnonville, Chassin (1892, v. III, pp. 465-465)) General Marcé described the insurgent losses as "considerable" in both dead and wounded, including the capture of their three small cannons. A dispatch from Fontenay-le-Comte administrators estimated 40 rebel deaths, a figure corroborated by historians Émile Gabory and Roger Dupuy. Alongside the cannons, the insurgents lost 1,200 bread rations and 1,200 cartridges.

Republican casualties were minimal, with Niou and Marcé reporting only three wounded: two officers and a cavalryman. The officers, described as "very lightly" injured, were Lieutenant-Colonel Laborie and Captain of Gendarmerie Garnier.

== See also ==
- War in the Vendée
- French First Republic
- French Revolution

== Bibliography ==
- La Boutetière, Louis de (1869). Le chevalier de Sapinaud et les chefs vendéens du Centre: notes, lettres et documents pour servir à l'histoire des cinq premiers mois de la guerre de la Vendée (in French). Académie des bibliophiles. p. 137.
- Chassin, Charles-Louis (1892). La préparation de la guerre de Vendée 1789-1793 (in French). Vol. III. Paris: Imprimerie Paul Dupont. p. 628.
- Dupuy, Roger (2005). Nouvelle histoire de la France contemporaine. Points. Histoire (in French). Vol. 2: La République jacobine : Terreur, guerre et gouvernement révolutionnaire, 1792–1794. Paris: Éditions du Seuil. p. 366. ISBN 2-02-039818-4.
- Gabory, Émile (2009) [1912–1931]. Les Guerres de Vendée (in French). Robert Laffont. p. 1476.
- Gérard, Alain (1999). Par principe d'humanité...: La Terreur et la Vendée (in French). Fayard. p. 589.
- Gras, Yves (1994). La Guerre de Vendée (1793-1796) (in French). Economica. p. 192.
- Martin, Jean-Clément (2014). La guerre de Vendée 1793-1800 (in French). Points. p. 368.
- Savary, Jean Julien Michel (1824). Guerres des Vendéens et des Chouans contre la République (in French). Vol. I.
- Valin, Claudy (2010). "La bataille inaugurale dite du "Pont Charrault". Réalité et résonance". In Hervé Coutau-Bégarie and Charles Doré-Graslin (ed.). Histoire militaire des guerres de Vendée (in French). Economica. p. 656.
