= Marie Lourdais =

French revolutionary spy, smuggler, nurse

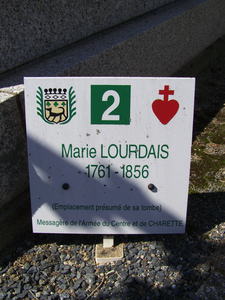
- Lourdais' presumed site of burial
- Born: 1761; La Houssais, Domalain, Canton of Argentré, Ille-et-Vilaine, France
- Died: October 30, 1856 (aged 94–95); La Gaubretière, France
- Resting place: Rue 11 du Novembre, La Gaubretière, France
- Other names: La bretonne, La paroissienner
- Occupations: Grocer, spy, messenger, nurse, smuggler
- Years active: 1792-1795
- Era: The War in the Vendée
- Employer(s): Francois-Athanase Charette de la Contrie, Charles Sapinaud de La Rairie
- Parents: André Lourdais (father); Renée Roussel (Rouxel) (mother)
- Family: Pierre-Francois Lourdais, Julienne Lourdais, Étienne-Marie, Renée, Jeanne-Marie-Andrée

Marie Lourdais (born 1761 in Domalain, (Ille-et-Vilaine) was a smuggler, messenger, spy and nurse/medic for the Catholic and Royal armies of the Bas-Poitu, during the French Revolution, namely serving under General François de Charette and General Sapinaud. A grocer in the town of La Gaubretière, she was 30, between 1792–93, when she began aiding the priests in escaping from Nantes; she then joined the Catholic and Royal Army of the Bas-Poitu under Charette in Belleville the same year. She brought news back and forth between the Generals Sapinaud and Charette in the final years of the war. Surviving the War in the Vendée she served Madame de Buor until 1829 and was then taken in by the Mayor of La Gaubretière, M. de Rangot, at whose house she died in 1856 at the age of 95.

== Early life and the start of the war ==
Marie Lourdais was the 5th out of 6 children of André Lourdais and Renée Roussel, (Rouxel). Born in the tiny village of Domalain, France, in the Canton of Argentré, (Ille-et-Vilaine), she moved to La Gaubretière and ran a grocery shop there until 1792. She was very close with the inhabitants of the town, and, as later described in her memoirs, constantly searched for those who had lived there during the years of the War. In 1792 she was informed of the dangers that the Roman Catholic Priests in the vicinity of Nantes were constantly living in. Although the French Revolution had mostly left her town alone, she immediately left for Nantes, disguising herself as a woman of that area by trading her normal, heavy Poitevin dress for the lighter ones worn in Nantes. She was quickly employed by the Mme de La Rochefoucauld to smuggle cassocks and other ornaments necessary for the celebration of the Mass to priests hiding outside of Nantes; after returning she was introduced to Ms. de Couëtus de la Brossardière, who sent her on errands for saving the priests outside of Nantes., Noticed once by the Republicans, they imprisoned her for a day, but, unable to make her confess anything, they let her free. She then further secured her safety by disguising herself as a peddler, selling small items as she was sent from one place to another. When she was not traveling, she attended the meetings of the Revolutionary tribunal in Nantes to better prepare herself and the priests for what was to come. On one notable event she heard of a planned imprisonment of all priests who reported to the municipality in the evening, as they had been ordered to do and had been doing for some time. She ran to warn her friends then hid herself near the municipality; whenever a priest arrived she pulled him by the cassock, warned him, and quickly hid him. Two she attempted to save, however, had already been spotted by Republican soldiers; Marie and the two were forced to run into the nearest house and she hid both, then disguised them as women and helped them escape the city. She lived in this way for circa 16 months until she was denounced; she continued her work but no longer entered Nantes.

== The army ==
Circa 1794, Lourdais, along with Madame de la Godardière, joined the Catholic and Royal army of the Bas-Poitu, under Charette. Joining at Belleville, the temporary headquarters of the Vendéens, she was quickly employed by several families and the army as a messenger. After some time General Charette had her distribute the food in his headquarters, and medicine to the wounded. She evacuated the injured and reported to Charette any information she had learned of enemy movements. During this time she also assisted the priests in the parishes of Chaudé, la Rabatelière, Beaufou, and Les Lucs-sur-Bologne; she informed and brought the Vendéen soldiers to wherever a Mass was to be celebrated by any of these priests. After visiting La Gaubretière and finding her parents killed, she decided and promised to stay with Charette's army until her death or the victory of the Royalists. She carried a message from Charette to the General d’Elbée on the Isle of Noirmoutier, who had been evacuated there after he received 14 wounds at the Second Battle of Cholet. She stayed two days on the island, in which time she saw the General D’Elbée and a wounded M. de Boisy, from La Gaubretière, who was also injured and was staying in the same building.

“They [D’Elbée & Boisy] received me well, gave me what I needed; General d'Elbée charged me with a letter which I brought back to General Charette and which I hid in the lining of my cap. He also instructed me to tell General Charette that he was going to die, but that he would die for his God and for his king. I left, and joined the army near Vieillevigne. General Charette cried when I told him what D’Elbée had said to me.”

— Marie Lourdais

Soon after, Generals Haxo and Turreau invaded Noirmoutier and, despite Haxo's promise of life to the inhabitants if they surrendered their arms, against his orders many were killed, including D’Elbée, M. de Boisy, Duhoux d’Hauterive and a Republican. These four were executed by firing squad; D’Elbée, too weak from his wounds, was shot and killed sitting in a chair. As the war declined Lourdais often aided the wounded in the battlefield and buried the dead. On one memorable occasion, on March 5–6, 1794, after a defeat at La Roche-sur-Yon, Marie was following and caring for a convoy of wounded at Saint-Sulpice when she was suddenly caught in an ambush of Revolutionaries upon the wounded. She dropped to the ground and lay motionless all night; several men fell dead on top of her. The next day, when she heard nothing, she rose to find every one of the wounded massacred; about 200, around her. Unable to bury them, she prayed for their souls before journeying back to Charette's army, surviving on only a piece of bread she found dropped on the road. She was the only one to survive the massacre.

== La Gaubretière ==
Throughout the war Marie Lourdais constantly searched for and found her neighbors from La Gaubretière in the ranks of the army; in the aforementioned massacre she recognized several she had known, two who went by the name of Garreau and Gaboriau. On May 20, 1794, she left the commune of Saint-Michel with some wounded she knew to La Gaubretière; she found the entire village destroyed. Also ruined was General de Sapinaud's home, Le Sourdy, at the outskirts of the village; she visited the General soon after and was given a letter from him for Charette. Talking of Sapinaud, Marie noted, “He, too, liked to leave his Beaurepaire camp, to see La Gaubretière and his château du Sourdy again; everywhere he encountered nothing but heaps of ash. One day, I found him seated, looking at the debris of his castle. He then said to me: "Here, my poor Breton, you can see this: I have nothing left; but if our King were on his throne, all my misfortunes would be forgotten; I would be the happiest of men.”

== Guerilla warfare and the end of the war ==
As the war declined, Charette and Sapinaud became guerrilla fighters; Marie Lourdais followed them and constantly delivered messages between the two. Her memoirs record the dates of many battles, ranging from before the treaty of La Jaunayne to January 5, 1795. She was also employed by the Abbé de la Colinière, who she helped to hide and delivered his messages to the General Charette, who was his cousin. After Sapinaud and Charette withdrew to Chavagnes only about a month before the end of the war, Marie Lourdais returned to the services of a Madame de Buor, who had her again assist the Abbé de la Colinière. She was sent one last time by the Abbé for General Charette; she then found that Charette had been wounded and taken by the Republicans in the woods of La Chabotterie, a few days before he was executed by a firing squad.

== Life after the war ==
Marie Lourdais served the Madame de Buor wherever her numerous affairs called for her, and they returned to La Gaubretière. Madame de Buor died in 1829 and Marie was taken in by the Madame's kind nephew, the mayor of La Gaubretière, M. de Rangot. In her final years she became blind; she died on the 30th of October, 1856, at the age or 95; she died the same day as her brother, Jeanne-Marie-Andrée Lourdais, who was only a year younger than herself.

“I will end up at his house for the rest of my days. I never got anything. God alone has rewarded me, since, now that I am blind, I am in a charitable house whose master provides for my needs.”

— Marie Lourdais, Autour de l'histoire de La Gaubretière: souvenirs de Marie Lourdais

Marie Lourdais’ assumed burial location is in the Cimetière de La Gaubretière.

== Relationship with the generals ==
Very soon after her entrance into the army, General Charette gave Marie the nickname ‘Bretonne’, often exclaiming ‘Ma Bretonne!’ upon seeing her; he did so because of her Breton origin; she also wore clothes from Brittany, so others could more easily recognize her. General Sapinaud also called her the same. Several times in her memoirs she mentions Sapinaud's kindness towards her;

“General Sapinaud liked me; he called me his parishioner, and each time I did errands for him, he gave me a drink from his gourd… [after the battle of Saint-Vincent in early 1794] I received bread and a pair of shoes; it was General de Sapinaud who gave me the shoes.”

== Popular culture ==
Marie Lourdais is written about by Thérèse Rouchette, "Femmes Oubliées de la Guerre de Vendée" In 'Le Dernier Panache', a show about the General François de Charette at the historically themed park the Puy du Fou, Marie Lourdais is depicted as giving the General an urgent message that the Bocage is burning.
