= Treaty of La Jaunaye =

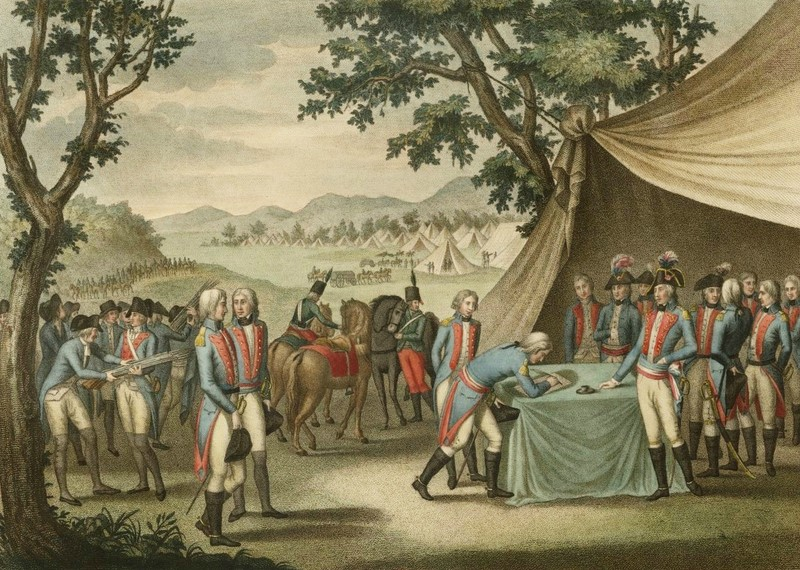
Signing the Treaty of La Jaunaye

The Treaty of La Jaunaye was a peace treaty for the War in the Vendée, agreed by François de Charette and Charles Sapinaud de La Rairie, on behalf of the leaders of the Catholic and Royal Army, and by Albert Ruelle on behalf of the National Convention on 17 February 1795 at the manor of La Jaunaye, at Saint-Sébastien-sur-Loire, near Nantes.

The treaty brought an end to major hostilities. The Vendée counter-revolutionaries and chouans recognised the French Republic and in return received assurances on freedom of religion, exemption from conscription and the right to keep their arms.

The treaty is signed only by representatives of the Convention.

== Background ==
In May 1794, General Louis Marie Turreau, commander of the Army of the West, was recalled from his post, and the practice of infernal columns was brought to an end. After the Thermidorian reaction, in August 1794 General Lazare Hoche was placed in charge of the Army of the Coasts of Brest and in October 1794, Jean Baptiste Canclaux was given command of the Army of the West. Both generals favoured conciliation with the rebels, and contacts were established with the insurgents through the intercession of Mme de Gasnier-Chambon, a creole from Saint-Domingue who knew Mlle de Charette, sister of the Vendée general.

== Negotiations ==
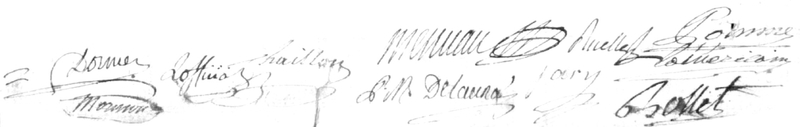
Signatures of representatives of the National Convention on the Treaty of La Jaunaye

These contacts led to a meeting at Saint-Sébastien, near Nantes, a commune held by the insurgents. Led by Canclaux and Charette, negotiations lasted from 12–17 February. The final agreement granted a number of concession to the rebels - an amnesty, a guarantee of religious freedom, and exemption from military service while retaining the right to keep their arms. All their goods were restored to them, and they were compensated for anything sold or burned, as well as reimbursed for their assignats. These undertakings applied even to individuals listed as émigrés. The Republican armies also agreed to withdraw from the rebel-held areas.

On behalf of the French Republic, the treaty was signed by Ruelle, Delaunay, Pomme, Brue, Lofficial, Chaillon, Bollet, Jary, Menuau, Dornier and Morrisson. On behalf of the Catholic Royalists it was signed by Charette, Fleuriot, Couëtus, Cormatin, de Bruc, Guérin the older, Caillaud, de Foignard, Goguet, Lepinay, Sauvaget, Baudry, Guérin the younger, Solilhac, Béjarry, de Bruc the younger, Prudhomme, Rejeau, de la Roberie, Rousseau, Bossard the younger and the older son of Auvinet. The leader of the Catholic and Royal Army, Jean-Nicolas Stofflet, who did not arrive at Nantes until 18 February, refused to sign the treaty, and only eventually did so on 2 May at Saint-Florent-le-Vieil.

== Aftermath ==
The treaty did not bring a complete cessation of hostilities, as several of its signatories took up arms again in the months which followed. Charette broke the treaty on 24 June 1795, having recently learned of the death of Louis XVII on 8 June. He was pursued by government forces, arrested on 2 March 1796 at Saint-Sulpice-le-Verdon and executed by firing squad at Nantes on 29 March. Sapinaud resorted to arms once again in October 1795. but surrendered again in January 1796 at Nantes. Stofflet, for his part, rebelled again in January 1796, on the orders of the Count of Artois, who appointed him lieutenant-general. He was quickly taken and executed at Angers on 25 February 1796. Despite these attacks, life in the area previously controlled by the Vendée became more regular in 1796 and 1797.

== Location ==
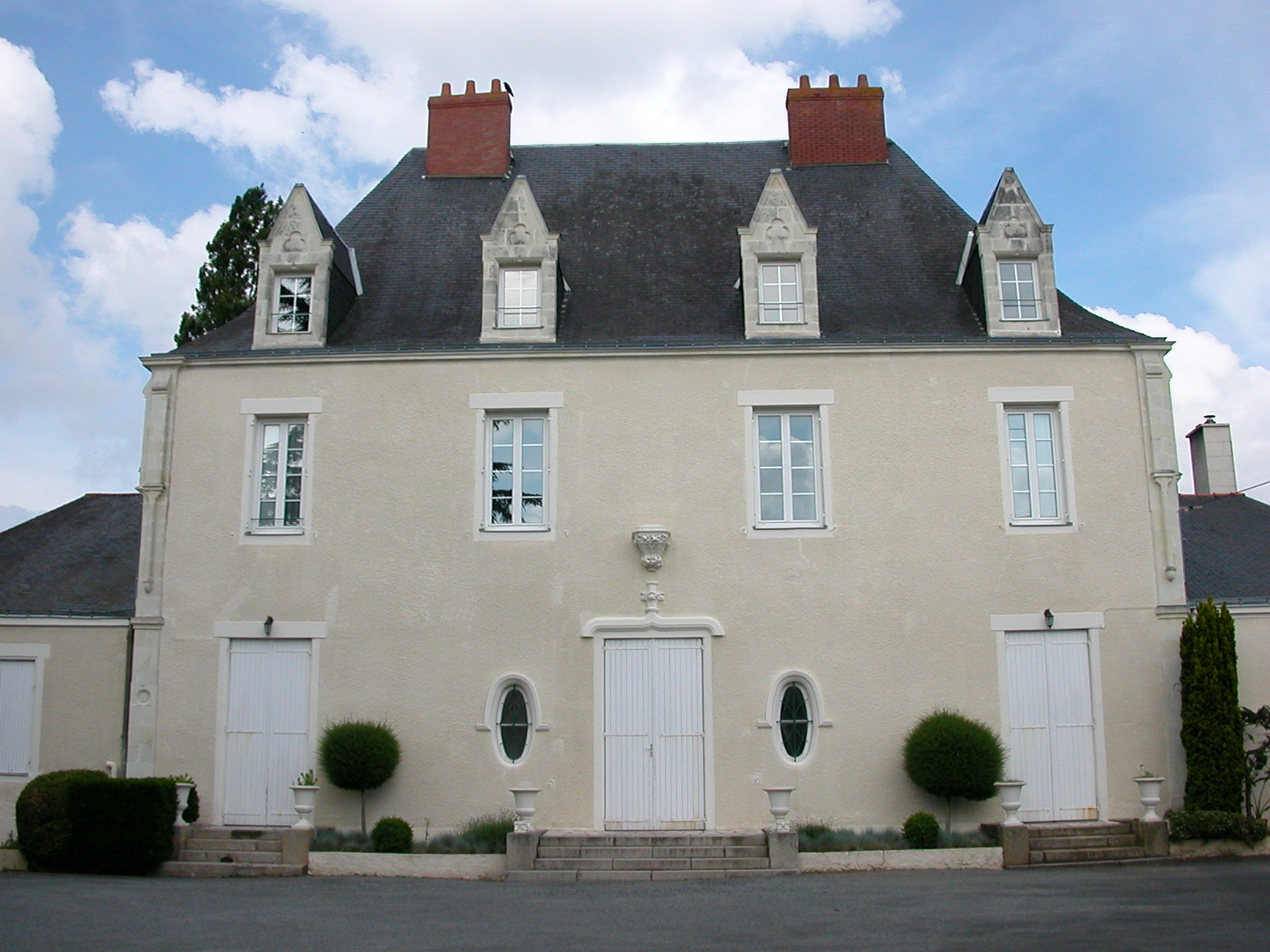
Manor of La Grande Jaunaie today

Two neighbouring manors, la Grande Jaunaie and la Petite Jaunaie, existed in 1795 and still stand today. Sources are unclear which of them was the location for the negotiations and the agreement. Today the older building, la Petite Jaunaie, is a private house in the rue Charette de la Contrie. La Grande Jaunaie, built in the 18th century by Claude de Monti, a nobleman from Nantes after he bought the estate, is today a children's home in the rue de la Jaunaie. It is likely though that the conference was held in la Grande Jaunaie and the signing ceremony took place in a tent, closer to la Petite Jaunaie.
