= Essarts-en-Bocage =

- Commune
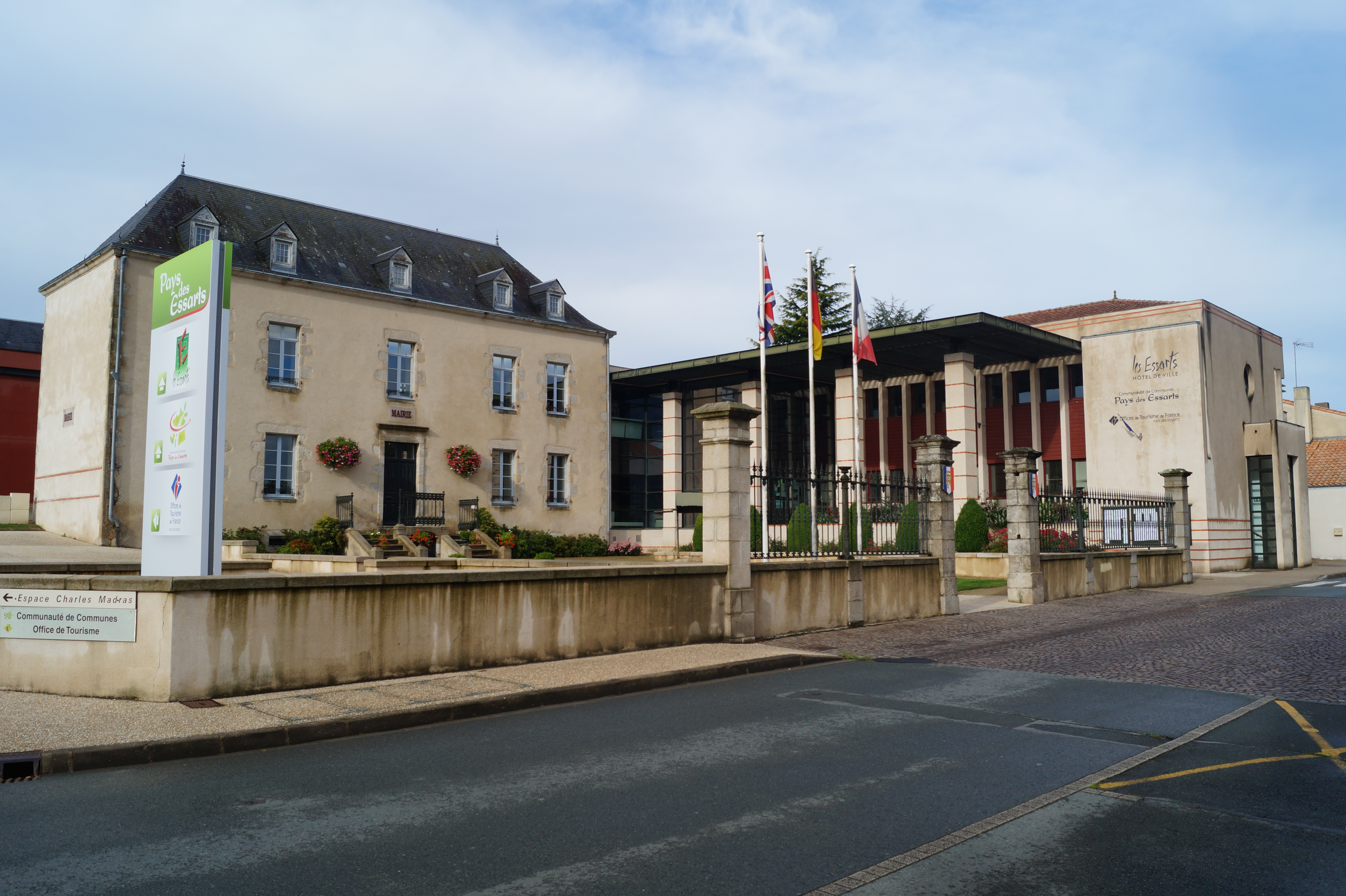
- Location of Essarts-en-Bocage
- Location within France Location within Pays de la Loire
- Coordinates: 46°46′28″N 1°13′37″W
- Country: France
- Region: Pays de la Loire
- Department: Vendée
- Arrondissement: La Roche-sur-Yon
- Canton: Chantonnay
- Intercommunality: Pays de Saint-Fulgent - Les Essarts

Government
  - Mayor (2024–2026): Caroline Gilbert
- Area^{1}: 68.47 km^{2} (26.44 sq mi)
- Highest elevation: 116 m (381 ft)
- Lowest elevation: 48 m (157 ft)
- Population (2023): 6,851
  - Density: 100.1/km^{2} (259.2/sq mi)
- Time zone: UTC+01:00 (CET)
  - Summer (DST): UTC+02:00 (CEST)
- INSEE/Postal code: 85084 /85140
- ^{1} French Land Register data, which excludes lakes, ponds, glaciers > 1 km^{2} (0.386 sq mi or 247 acres) and river estuaries.

Essarts-en-Bocage (French pronunciation: [esaʁ ɑ̃ bɔkaʒ]) is a commune in the Vendée department in the Pays de la Loire region in western France. The municipality was established on 1 January 2016 by merger of the former communes of Boulogne, Les Essarts, L'Oie and Sainte-Florence. On 1 January 2024, L'Oie and Sainte-Florence left Essarts-en-Bocage and were re-established as communes.

== Population ==
Population data refer to the commune in its geography as of January 2025.

Historical population
Year	Pop.	±% p.a.
1968	3,517	—
1975	3,783	+1.05%
1982	4,068	+1.04%
1990	4,430	+1.07%
1999	4,733	+0.74%
2007	5,479	+1.85%
2012	5,972	+1.74%
2017	6,471	+1.62%
2023	6,851	+0.96%
Source: INSEE

== See also ==
- Communes of the Vendée department
