= Les Essarts, Vendée =

Les Essarts
- Part of Essarts-en-Bocage
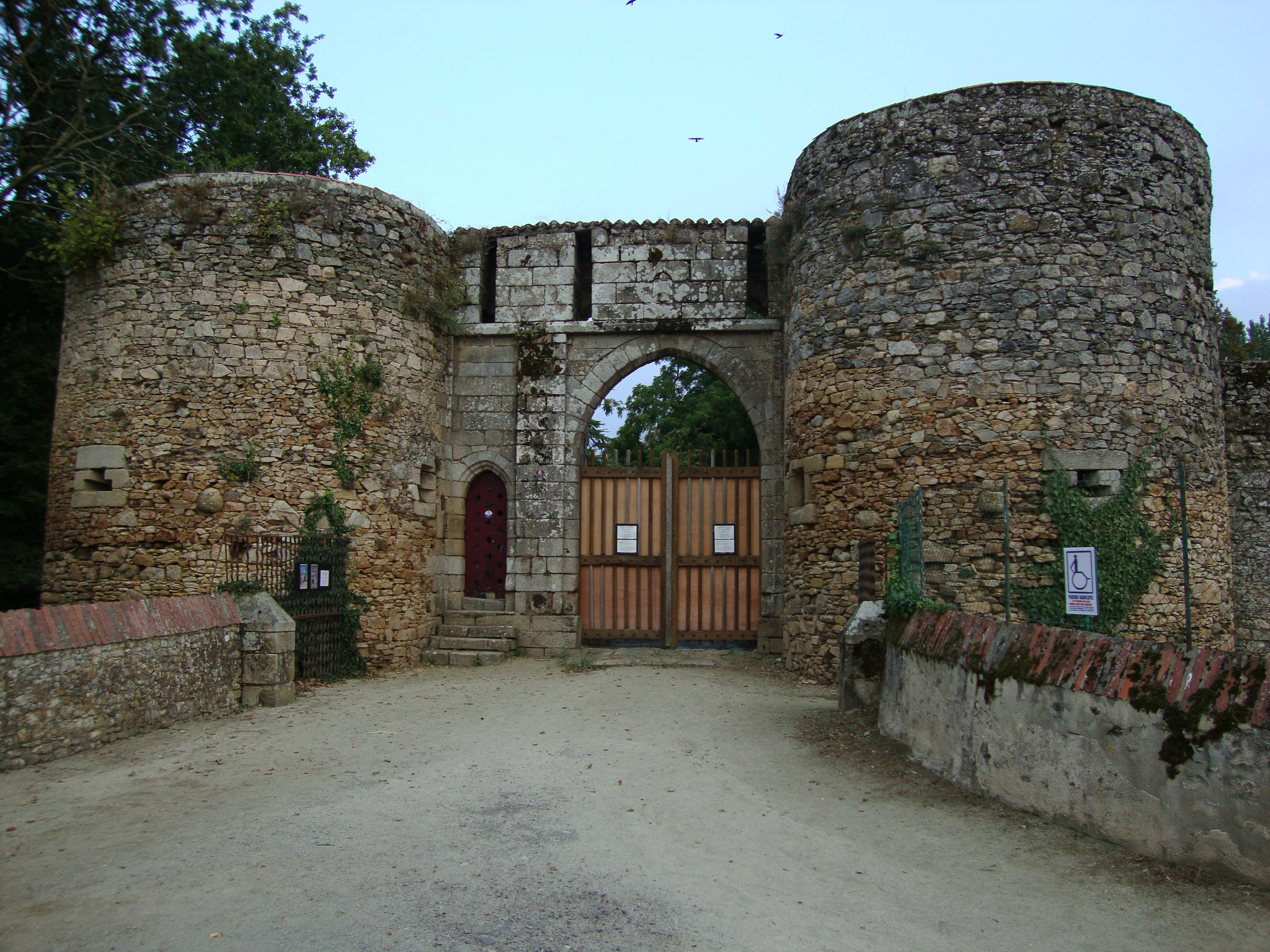
- The Château of Les Essarts

- Coat of arms
- Location of Les Essarts
- Location within France Location within Pays de la Loire
- Coordinates: 46°46′28″N 1°13′37″W
- Country: France
- Region: Pays de la Loire
- Department: Vendée
- Arrondissement: La Roche-sur-Yon
- Canton: Chantonnay
- Commune: Essarts-en-Bocage
- Area^{1}: 56.24 km^{2} (21.71 sq mi)
- Elevation: 100 m (330 ft)
- Highest elevation: 116 m (381 ft)
- Lowest elevation: 55 m (180 ft)
- Population (2022): 5,824
  - Density: 103.6/km^{2} (268.2/sq mi)
- Time zone: UTC+01:00 (CET)
  - Summer (DST): UTC+02:00 (CEST)
- Postal code: 85140
- ^{1} French Land Register data, which excludes lakes, ponds, glaciers > 1 km^{2} (0.386 sq mi or 247 acres) and river estuaries.

Les Essarts (French pronunciation: [lez‿esaʁ]) is a former commune in the Vendée department in the Pays de la Loire region in western France. Since 1 January 2016, it is part of Essarts-en-Bocage.

== Geography ==
The town of Les Essarts is located between the A83 and the A87 motorways, between La Roche sur Yon and Les Herbiers, 55 km from les Sables d'Olonne and 30 km from Le Puy du Fou.

== History ==
The city was built at the Roman period. At the Middle Ages, there was a lord in the middle of the town, and a fort was built. During the war in the Vendée, on 25 June 1795, a battle took place in the Les Essarts fort. Charette hired Louis Pageot, one of his lieutenants, to surprise the garrison of Les Essarts. 300 republicans were caught, and then shot after the execution of 748 chouans.

During World War II, Germans occupied the Moulin de l'Ansonnière.

== Demography ==
In 2022, Les Essarts counted 5,824 inhabitants. In 1800, date people started to record the number of inhabitants there, there was 1844 inhabitants in the town.

== Sights ==
=== Historical Places ===
The Old Castle : The story of the castle starts at the Roman period, according to research made in 1935, which led to the creation of a « Suovetaurilia » : a sacrificial altar dedicated to March. Then, the first fort in Les Essarts (a wooden castle) was made at the feudal period. Starting from the 18th century, lords living around started to build a castle in stone. During the war in the Vendée (1793–1796, counterrevolution in the Vendée region of France during the French Revolution) the castle was partly destroyed. Descendants of the Lespinay and De Rougé families still own it.

The St Pierre Church: The St Pierre Church was built in the 19th century. Before that a Roman church was at this place, built in the 11th and 12th centuries. It was burnt during the war in the Vendée by the Republican forces. The entrance of the previous church still exists, it has been transported stone by stone in the castle’s park.

The Crypt: The crypt, located near from the sacristy, was built in the 12th century. It is referenced as a historical monument since 1971.

The previous train station: In 1898, a railroad was built to link Cholet to Les Sables d’Olonne. Between La Roche sur Yon and Les Herbiers, there was the Les Essarts train station. The train disappeared in Les Essarts in 1950 and has been restored as a place to live.

L’Ansonnière Mill: It is one of the last Mill that we could found before in this town. In 1926, Alcide Gautron stopped his activity. During WWII, German people occupied it and transformed it in an observatory point. In 1992, the Mill was bought by the town hall and restored.

== Clubs ==
The town of Les Essarts has various associations with diverse goals. Thus, you can find sport clubs, like Les Korrigans dancing club, the soccer team, or the basketball team, cultural and leisure clubs, like a music club etc. Some clubs are working in the agricultural world, others in the social world, like Telethon. Also, some clubs are representing the military or the education. The town of Les Essarts is also the headquarters of the cycling team Vendée U Pays de la Loire, and of the professional cycling team Europcar (the leader of this team, Thomas Voeckler, ended up being 4th at the end of the Tour de France in 2011).

== Events ==
The town of Les Essarts was a stage city of the Tour de France in 2005 and in 2011. First, Les Essarts was the ending town of the 2nd stage of the Tour de France 2005, which was linking Challans to Les Essarts. Then, on 3 July 2011, the 2nd stage of the Tour de France 2011, a team-time trial which had Les Essarts as a starting and an ending point! The departure was in the Old Castle, then they went to Boulogne, Dompierre-sur-Yon and La Merlatière, and came back to les Essarts.

== Partnerships with other towns ==
Les Essarts has a partnership with Neunkirchen-Seelscheid in Germany since 1991 and with Bicester in the United Kingdom since 1992. Neunkirchen-Seelscheid is located in the Land Nordrhein-Westfalen, near from Cologne, and Bicester in the Oxford region.

== See also ==
- Communes of the Vendée department
