= Céleste Bulkeley =

French soldier

Celeste Bulkeley
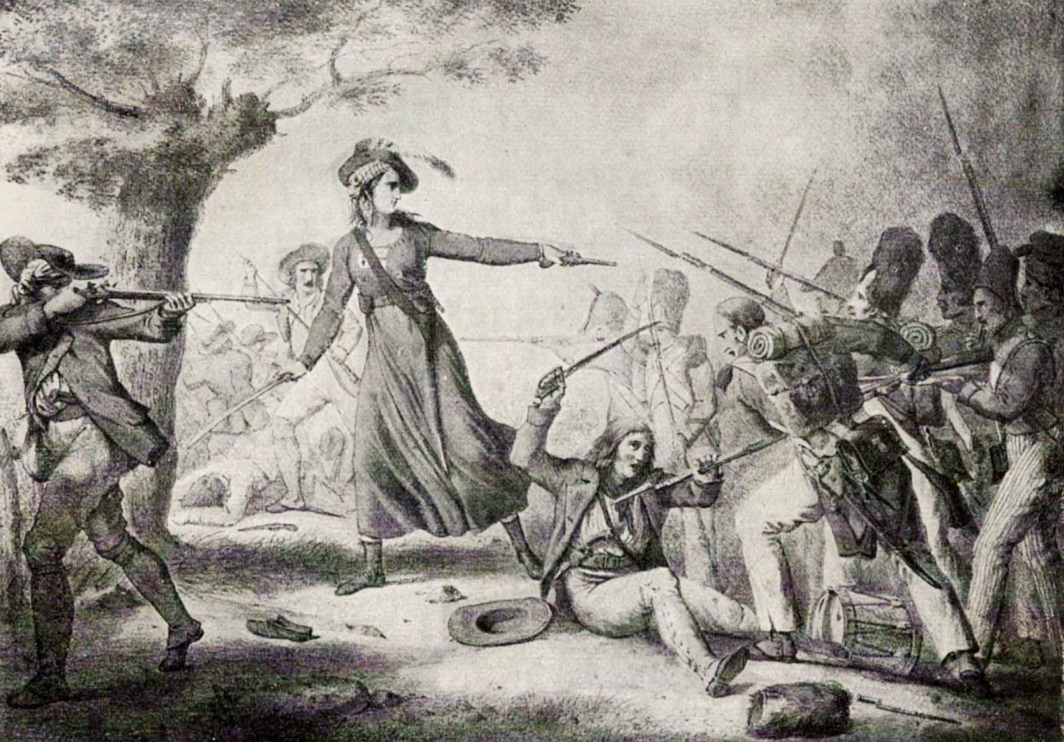
- Born: Céleste Julie Michèle Talour de La Cartrie de la Villenière; 14 May 1753; Angers, France
- Died: 13 March 1832 (aged 78) Angers, France
- Allegiance: (Kingdom of France) Catholic and Royal Army
- Service years: 1793–1796

Céleste Bulkeley (née Céleste Talour de La Cartrie; 14 May 1753 – 13 March 1832) was a French aristocrat and soldier in the Catholic and Royal Army during the war in the Vendée. She was one of at least six women in the army of François de Charette known as the "amazons". She was particularly known in the 19th century, being included as a heroine in many school books of the time.

== Life ==
=== Early life ===
Céleste Julie Michèle Talour de La Cartrie de la Villenière was born on 14 May 1753, in the city of Angers. She was one of the 14 children of Guy Barthélemy Talour de la Cartrie and Jeanne Ollivier, who lived at the Château de la Villenière in La Pouëze. Various testimonies generally describe Céleste Bulkeley as a tall and beautiful woman with blonde hair.

In 1779, Céleste married Louis Henri Marie Chappot de la Brossardière. She then settled at the Château de la Brossardière, in La Roche-sur-Yon. The couple had a daughter, Aminthe. However, Chappot de la Brossardière died on 27 April 1785.

In November 1786, Céleste remarried William Bulkeley, an Irish lieutenant serving in the Regiment de Walsh. Between 1788 and 1790, Bulkeley's battalion was sent on garrison duty to Île-de-France (Mauritius), where she accompanied her husband. Upon their return to France, William Bulkeley resigned from the military, and the couple retired to Château de la Brossardière.

=== War of the Vendee ===
In March 1793, Vendée rose up against the edict of levée en masse. By 14 March 1793, she and her husband partook in the insurrection, and with a host of peasants, later joined with the army of Charles Aimé de Royrand. Céleste fought directly alongside her husband in the battles they participated in. On 23 August 1793, the Republicans took La Roche-sur-Yon, which was evacuated by the Vendeans. On 26 August, general Jean-Baptiste Joly came to the aid of the Bulkeley couple and tried to retake the city, but was rebuffed.

Her brother Toussaint Ambroise Talour de la Cartrie wrote, "My sister, as brave as a true heroine, never left her husband's side, fighting alongside him in every battle he engaged in. Although her clothing was often pierced by bullets, she passed through all dangers unscathed." A biographer of François de Charette, Le Bouvier-Desmortiers described her as such, "Madame de Beauglie, the wife of an officer in the regiment de Walsh, commanded a company of hunters (chasseurs) that she maintained, it is said, at her own expense, and she wore the uniform dressed as an amazon. Her warrior spirit did not take away any of the charms of her gender; she was as delightful in society as she was brave on the battlefield."

Republican accounts were less positive; while they describe her husband William as having a "gentle character", one account tells that before fleeing La Roche-sur-Yon, certain Vendeans supported by Céleste demanded the killing of Republican prisoners held in the town, but that her husband opposed it.

After the fall of La Roche-sur-Yon, general Charette welcomed the couple into his army, where they participated in several more battles. They fled after the rout at the Battle of Le Mans, but were arrested by Republican forces and tried at Angers. Both husband and wife were sentenced to death on 2 January 1794; William was executed via guillotine, but Céleste had her sentence commuted when she declared herself pregnant. Her daughter to her first husband, Aminthe, died in prison at age 12, on the night of 10 to 11 February 1794.

Céleste was released after the end of the Terror and went to join general Charette's army again. In October 1794, a Republican report told of an attack by the "Amazon Bulkeley (Bucly)" against a detachment of 200 soldiers quartered at the Château du Givre, between Avrillé and Saint-Cyr-en-Talmondais. After the signing of the Treaty of La Jaunaye in February 1795, she returned to Château de la Brossardière. She followed Charette when he again took up arms in June 1795.

According to the historian Lionel Dumarcet, Céleste Bulkeley was "for a significant part, the origin of the legend of Charette's amazons... Royalists and Republicans unanimously described her as frequently taking up arms more often than her turn."

=== Later life ===
In October 1797, Céleste Bulkeley again remarried, to Jacques Thoreau de la Richardière but he would die 10 months later. In 1803, she remarried for the fourth time with a Republican officer from the Nantes garrison, Captain François Pissière of the 24th Infantry Regiment.

She died in Angers on 13 March 1832, at 78 years of age.

== Sources ==
- L'histoire tragique de Céleste Bulkeley est racontée dans « Un Vendéen sous la Terreur », d’après le manuscrit de son frère Toussaint Ambroise Talour de la Cartrie; ce manuscrit, aujourd'hui perdu, a d'abord été édité en anglais puis re-traduit en français par Pierre Amédée Pichot (édition de 1910 et fac-similé de 1988).
- L'histoire de sa sœur Jeanne Ambroise, aussi très engagée dans l'insurrection vendéenne, est écrite dans « Madame de Sapinaud », réimpression de l'édition de 1823.
