= Sainte-Florence, Vendée =

Sainte-Florence
- Commune
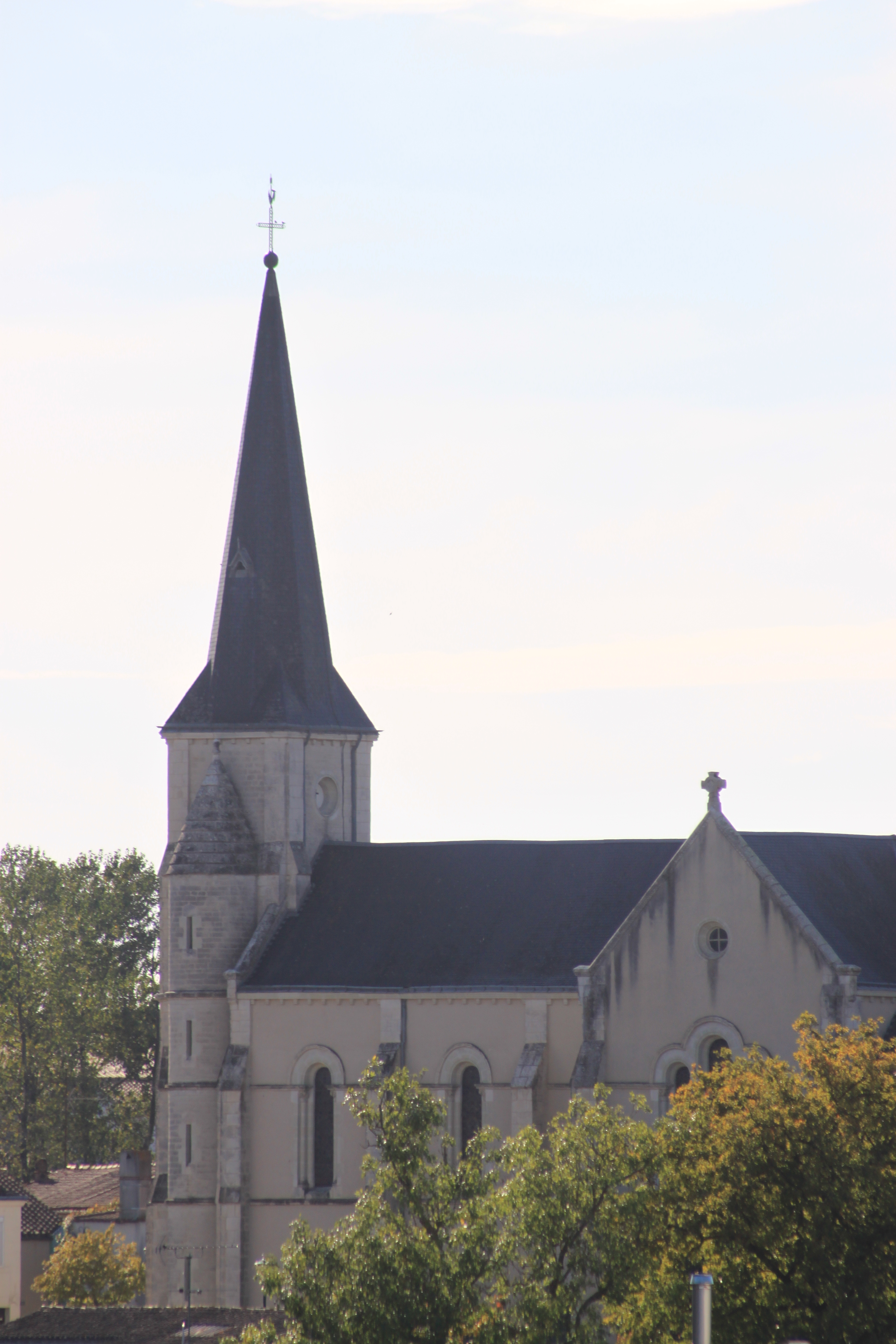
- The church in Sainte-Florence
- Location of Sainte-Florence
- Location within France Location within Pays de la Loire
- Coordinates: 46°47′53″N 1°09′02″W
- Country: France
- Region: Pays de la Loire
- Department: Vendée
- Arrondissement: La Roche-sur-Yon
- Canton: Chantonnay

Government
  - Mayor (2024–2026): Christelle Gréau
- Area^{1}: 17.09 km^{2} (6.60 sq mi)
- Highest elevation: 107 m (351 ft)
- Lowest elevation: 48 m (157 ft)
- Population (2023): 1,359
  - Density: 79.52/km^{2} (206.0/sq mi)
- Time zone: UTC+01:00 (CET)
  - Summer (DST): UTC+02:00 (CEST)
- INSEE/Postal code: 85212 /85140
- ^{1} French Land Register data, which excludes lakes, ponds, glaciers > 1 km^{2} (0.386 sq mi or 247 acres) and river estuaries.

Sainte-Florence (French pronunciation: [sɛ̃t flɔʁɑ̃s]) is a commune in the Vendée department in the Pays de la Loire region in western France. Between January 2016 and January 2024, it was part of Essarts-en-Bocage.

== See also ==
- Communes of the Vendée department
