= Boulogne, Vendée =

Boulogne
- Part of Essarts-en-Bocage
- Location of Boulogne
- Location within France Location within Pays de la Loire
- Coordinates: 46°47′43″N 1°19′11″W
- Country: France
- Region: Pays de la Loire
- Department: Vendée
- Arrondissement: La Roche-sur-Yon
- Canton: Chantonnay
- Commune: Essarts-en-Bocage
- Area^{1}: 12.23 km^{2} (4.72 sq mi)
- Highest elevation: 93 m (305 ft)
- Lowest elevation: 64 m (210 ft)
- Population (2022): 1,011
  - Density: 82.67/km^{2} (214.1/sq mi)
- Time zone: UTC+01:00 (CET)
  - Summer (DST): UTC+02:00 (CEST)
- Postal code: 85140
- ^{1} French Land Register data, which excludes lakes, ponds, glaciers > 1 km^{2} (0.386 sq mi or 247 acres) and river estuaries.

Boulogne (French pronunciation: [bulɔɲ]) is a former commune in the Vendée department, region of Pays de la Loire, France. On 1 January 2016, it was merged into the new commune of Essarts-en-Bocage.

== See also ==
- Communes of the Vendée department
