= Jacques Alexis de Verteuil =

Jacques Alexis de Verteuil (26 March 1726 – 24 December 1793) was a French general and chevalier of the Order of the Holy Spirit (1770). Having served in French Canada and Governor of the Île d'Yeu from 1768, Verteuil was in command at La Rochelle at the opening of the French Revolution. He then became a commanding lieutenant-general of the Catholic royalist army during the revolt in the Vendée. Captured at Savenay, he was executed as a prisoner of the National Convention for his counter-revolutionary activities (condemned as a "brigand") in the Vendée.

Born at Beaurepaire, Vendée, Poitou, the son of Leonard de Verteuil, baron de Feuillas (1680-1743), Jacques Alexis married in August 1754 at Louisbourg, Nova Scotia, Marie du Pont du Vivier de Gourville, daughter of the seigneur de Gourville, a title he inherited.
