= Marie-Rose Tessier =

French supercentenarian (1910–2026)

- Born: Marie-Rose Bousseau; 21 May 1910; Beaurepaire, Vendée, Pays de la Loire, France
- Died: 10 February 2026 (aged 115 years, 265 days); Les Sables-d'Olonne, France
- Spouse: Auguste Tessier (1904–1944) (m. 1927; died 1944)

Marie-Rose Tessier (née Bousseau; 21 May 1910 – 10 February 2026) (French pronunciation: [maʁi‿ʁoz tɛsiɛʁ]) was a French supercentenarian. At the time of her death, she was the oldest living French person and the second oldest living person in the world.

== Biography ==
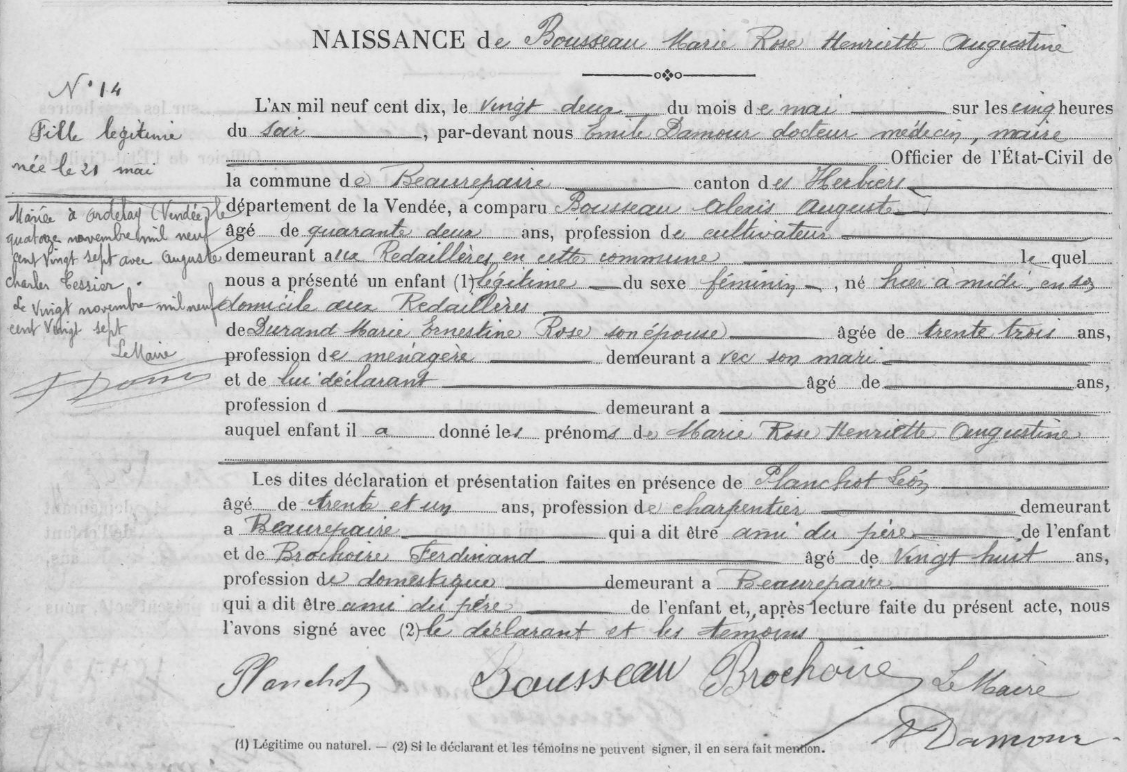
Tessier's birth certificate

Marie-Rose Henriette Augustine Bousseau was born on 21 May 1910 in Beaurepaire, in the Vendée department in what is now the Pays de la Loire region.

Tessier's father, Alexis Auguste Bousseau (1868–1935), was a farmer, and her mother, Marie Ernestine Rose Durand (1876–1962), was a housewife. Marie-Rose was the youngest of the couple's four children and the only girl.

She married Auguste Charles Tessier (1904–1944) in November 1927 in Ardelay, Vendée. They had two daughters: Denise (1928–2020) and Yvette (1929–2010). Auguste was killed during World War II in Tergnier, Aisne.

After 2010, Tessier lived in a nursing home in Les Sables-d'Olonne.

Tessier became the oldest living woman in France following the death of Lucile Randon on 17 January 2023.

Tessier died on 10 February 2026, at the age of 115.
