= Alain Girard =

French sociologist and demographer

- Born: 13 March 1914; France
- Died: 11 January 1996 (aged 82); France

Philosophical work
- Era: 20th century
- Region: Western Europe
- School: Sociology
- Main interests: Sociology, Demography
- Notable ideas: Studies on marital choice and educational inequalities

Alain Girard (13 March 1914 – 11 January 1996), was a French sociologist and demographer. He was known for his research on spouse selection and educational inequalities.

== Life and career ==
In 1946, Alain Girard was recruited by Alfred Sauvy at the French National Institute for Demographic Studies, where he spent most of his career as a deputy to Jean Stoetzel and as head of the psychosociology section.

In 1964, he was appointed professor at the Sorbonne in the chair of demography.

== Publications ==
- Français et émigrés, Paris, 1953
- Développement économique et mobilité des travailleurs, Paris, 1956
- Les tendances démographiques en France et les attitudes de la population, Population, Paris, 1960
- La Réussite sociale en France, Paris, 1961
- La Stratification sociale et la démocratisation de l'Enseignement, Paris, 1963
- Le Journal intime, Paris, 1963
- Les diverses classes sociales devant l'Enseignement : mise au point générale des résultats, Population, Paris, 1965
- Le Choix du conjoint, Paris, 1974. Reissued as Le Choix du conjoint. Une enquête psycho-sociologique en France, Armand Colin, "Classics Library" collection, 2012, 327 p., Introduction by Wilfried Rault and Arnaud Régnier-Loilier, ISBN 978-2-200-27832-8.
- Les Immigrés du Maghreb : études sur l'adaptation en milieu urbain, INED, 1977 [Online Presentation [archive]
- L'Homme et le nombre des hommes. Essai sur les conséquences de la révolution démographique, Paris, 1984.
