= Amédée de Béjarry =

French politician

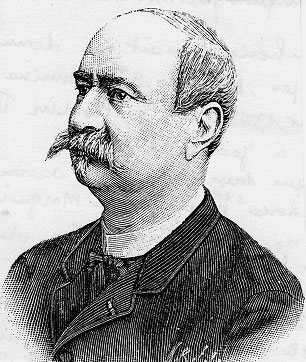
- Born: 30 June 1840; Saint-Vincent-Puymaufrais, Vendée, France
- Died: 1 October 1916 (aged 76); Saint-Vincent-Puymaufrais, Vendée, France
- Occupation: Politician

Amédée de Béjarry (30 June 1840 – 1 October 1916) was a French politician. He served as a member of the French Senate from 1886 to 1916, representing Vendée.
