= Haxo =

Haxo is a surname. Notable people with the surname include:

- Nicolas Haxo (1749–1794), French general
- François Nicolas Benoît, Baron Haxo (1774–1838), French Army general and military engineer

== See also ==
- Haxo (Paris Métro)
