= Fleuriot =

Fleuriot is a surname. Notable people with the surname include:

- Jean-Baptiste Fleuriot-Lescot (1761–1794), Belgian architect, sculptor, and a revolutionary
- Léon Fleuriot (1923–1987), French linguist and Celtic scholar
- Madelina Fleuriot (born 2003), Haitian footballer
- Paul Antoine Fleuriot de Langle (1744–1787), French vicomte, académicien de marine, naval commander and explorer
- Zénaïde Fleuriot (1829–1890), French novelist
