= Jean-Louis Carra =

French journalist and politician

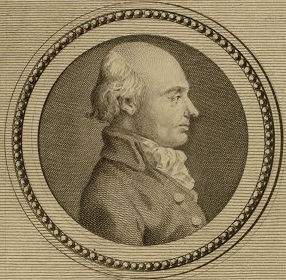
- Born: 9 March 1742; Pont-de-Veyle (France)
- Died: 31 October 1793 (aged 51); Paris, French First Republic
- Cause of death: Execution by guillotine

Signature
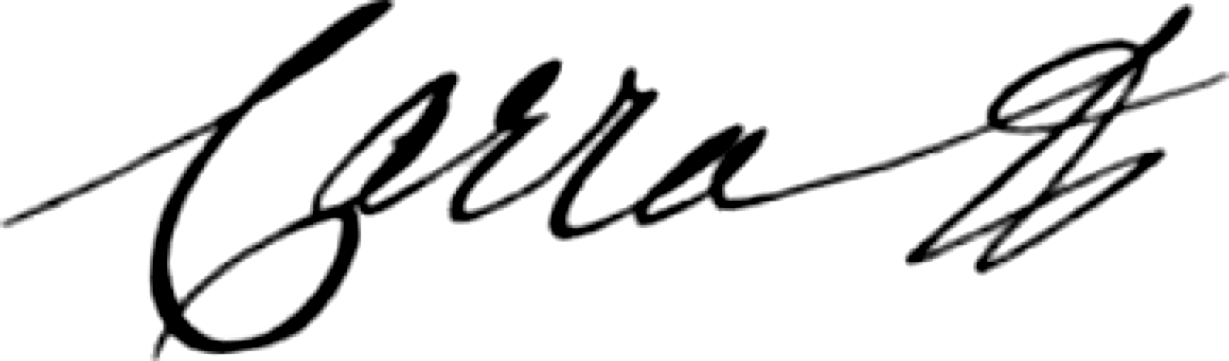

Jean-Louis Carra (born on 9 March 1742 in Pont-de-Veyle and guillotined on 31 October 1793 in Paris) was a journalist and participant in the French Revolution. He played a key role in the Insurrection of 10 August 1792 that overthrew the monarchy.

== Biography ==
=== Early life ===
He was the son of a commissioner of seigniorial rights. When he was still at college in Mâcon, he was imprisoned accused of stealing ribbons. In 1768–1769, he was secretary to the Marc Antoine René de Voyer. There followed a period of wandering in Switzerland and in England, where he was imprisoned for debt, in Russia and in the Moldavia of Prince Grigore Ghica. After collaborating on the Encyclopedia of Yverdon, he joined the team writing the Supplément à l'Encyclopédie in July 1771, for which he wrote 400 articles on geography, and which he left in June 1772 after a quarrel with the editorial director Robinet. He brought the matter into the public domain by publishing a violent pamphlet against Robinet. In 1776, after a stay in Warsaw, he returned to France. In 1784, thanks to the protection of Baron de Breteuil, he entered the Histoire de la Bibliothèque nationale de France.

=== The Revolution ===
During the Revolution, he was noticed early on by his contributions to the Annales patriotiques et littéraires.. Active in the Jacobin Club and the Society of the Friends of the Blacks, he was appointed, jointly with Chamfort, to head the Bibliothèque nationale on 19.

The Annales patriotiques were in many clubs. In the villages every popular society had its Carra partisan. Everything that was said in these associations was collected by this paper, which spread information from one end of France to the other.

As early as 29 December 1790, Carra appeared at the tribune of the Jacobin club, declaring war on the emperor Leopold, and adding that, to raise all the peoples of Germany, he only asked for 50,000 men, 12 presses, printers and paper, but then, even in this club, no one favored war, and Mirabeau had him covered in boos.

On 8 September 1792, he presented himself at the bar of the legislative body, and had a gold snuffbox placed on the desk, which he said had been given to him by the King of Prussia, in recognition of a work he had dedicated to him, and asked that this gold be used to fight the sovereign who had given it to him: he ended by tearing up the signature of the letter that the king had addressed to him. However, several people claimed that, despite all these protestations of a republicanism that knew neither deference nor indulgence, Carra was the agent of a party that wanted to place the Duke of Brunswick on the throne of France. This suspicion found fertile ground with Robespierre, who branded him a traitor, notwithstanding the fact that Carra had consistently been one of his most effective collaborators. Carra was one of the main promoters of the attack on the Tuileries, August 10, and boasted about it in his paper.

During the elections for the National Convention in Paris, Carra was among those excluded from the lists that voters could consider by Robespierre's partisans. However, Carra was elected deputy to the National Convention by the departments of Eure and Saône-et-Loire: he accepted the nomination of the latter while he was replaced in the former by Louis-Jacques Savary. In the trial of Louis XVI, he was one of the first to speak out against the appeal to the people. Moreover, he did not attract attention in this assembly, and reserved all his resources for his newspaper.

It was in this paper that, from the first months of 1792, he insisted that the populace be armed with pikes in order to oppose it to the national guard, composed solely of the bourgeois of each city, and he repeated this so often that his wishes were finally satisfied. This measure disorganized the public force that supported the weak constitution. The National Guard, especially in Paris, was very well-dressed and took pride in never appearing except in the most brilliant military costume. As soon as the pikes appeared, most of the companies did not want to be confused with the mob of pikemen, who were then called "sans-culottes", and stopped serving.

Rejected by Robespierre's party, Carra sided with the Brissotins, and was appointed, under the ministry of Roland, guard of the National Library. Soon the denunciations against him multiplied. Marat, Couthon and Robespierre had him recalled from a mission to Blois, on 12 June 1793. Carra was among those Girondins still active in the Convention even after the Insurrection of 31 May – 2 June 1793. Then on the 2nd of August Robespierre denounced him as a conspirator and a disguised Royalist. When he attempted to defend himself, he was shouted down and driven from the Convention. He was arrested and imprisoned. He was sentenced to death on October 30, 1793, by the revolutionary tribunal of Paris The next day he was beheaded as part of the group of 22 Girondin deputies executed that day.
