= L'Oie =

- Commune
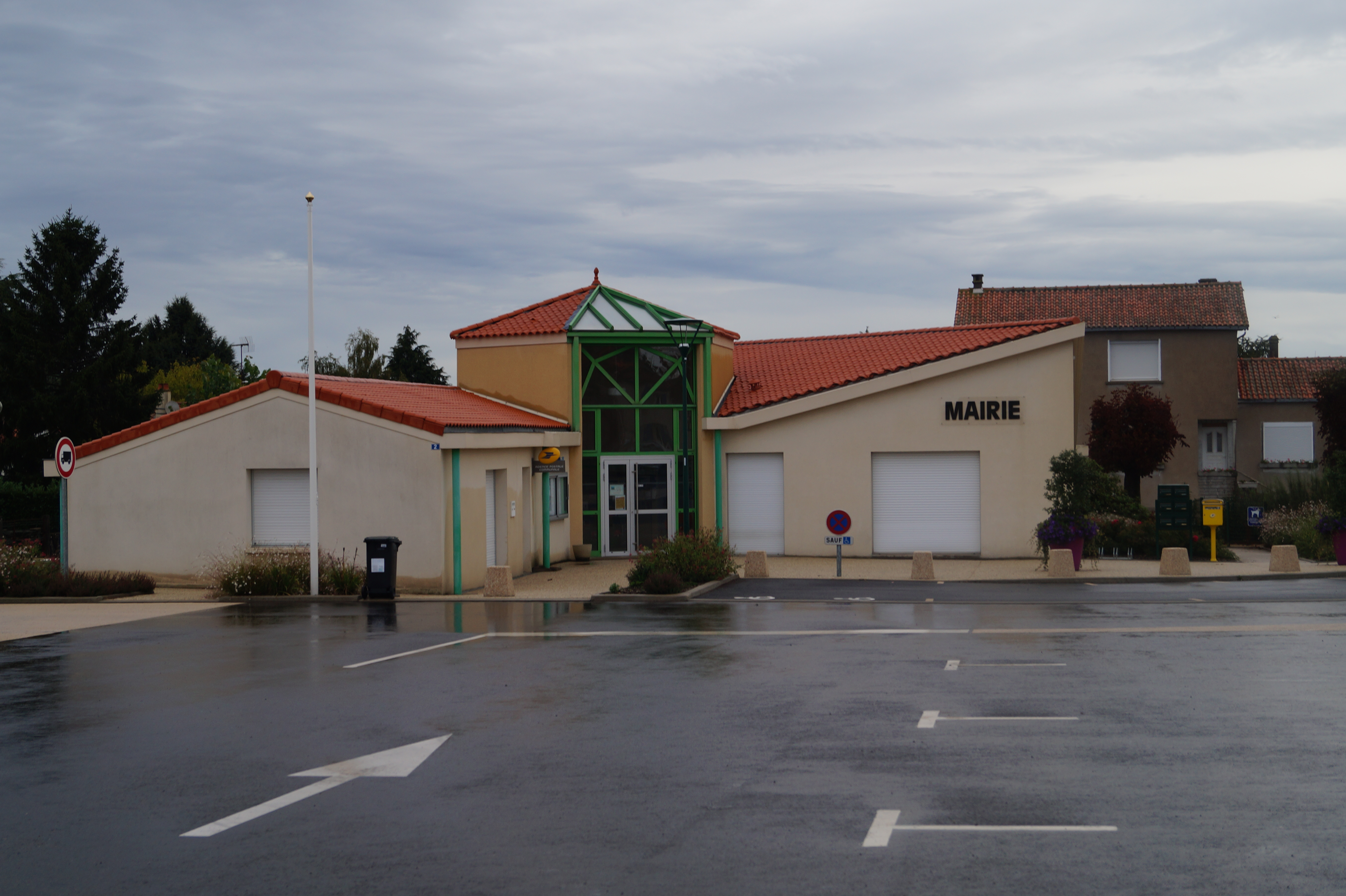

- Coat of arms
- Location of L'Oie
- Location within France Location within Pays de la Loire
- Coordinates: 46°47′56″N 1°07′41″W
- Country: France
- Region: Pays de la Loire
- Department: Vendée
- Arrondissement: La Roche-sur-Yon
- Canton: Chantonnay

Government
  - Mayor (2024–2026): Jean-Pierre Ratouit
- Area^{1}: 14.06 km^{2} (5.43 sq mi)
- Highest elevation: 110 m (360 ft)
- Lowest elevation: 48 m (157 ft)
- Population (2023): 1,250
  - Density: 88.9/km^{2} (230/sq mi)
- Time zone: UTC+01:00 (CET)
  - Summer (DST): UTC+02:00 (CEST)
- INSEE/Postal code: 85165 /85140
- ^{1} French Land Register data, which excludes lakes, ponds, glaciers > 1 km^{2} (0.386 sq mi or 247 acres) and river estuaries.

L'Oie (French pronunciation: [lwa]) is a commune in the Vendée department in the Pays de la Loire region in western France. Between January 2016 and January 2024, it was part of Essarts-en-Bocage.

== See also ==
- Communes of the Vendée department
