= Beaurepaire, Vendée =

Beaurepaire
- Commune
- Coat of arms
- Location of Beaurepaire
- Location within France Location within Pays de la Loire
- Coordinates: 46°54′41″N 1°05′16″W
- Country: France
- Region: Pays de la Loire
- Department: Vendée
- Arrondissement: La Roche-sur-Yon
- Canton: Mortagne-sur-Sèvre
- Intercommunality: Pays des Herbiers

Government
  - Mayor (2020–2026): Franck Gauthier
- Area^{1}: 24.19 km^{2} (9.34 sq mi)
- Highest elevation: 129 m (423 ft)
- Lowest elevation: 62 m (203 ft)
- Population (2023): 2,385
  - Density: 98.59/km^{2} (255.4/sq mi)
- Time zone: UTC+01:00 (CET)
  - Summer (DST): UTC+02:00 (CEST)
- INSEE/Postal code: 85017 /85500
- ^{1} French Land Register data, which excludes lakes, ponds, glaciers > 1 km^{2} (0.386 sq mi or 247 acres) and river estuaries.

Beaurepaire (French pronunciation: [boʁpɛʁ]) is a commune in the Vendée department in the Pays de la Loire region in western France.

== Population ==
Historical population
Year	Pop.	±% p.a.
1968	1,262	—
1975	1,201	−0.71%
1982	1,240	+0.46%
1990	1,368	+1.24%
1999	1,551	+1.40%
2007	1,982	+3.11%
2012	2,248	+2.55%
2017	2,401	+1.33%
2023	2,385	−0.11%
Source: INSEE

== Notable people ==
- Marie-Rose Tessier (1910–2026), oldest living French person and second-oldest living person in the world at the time of her death.

== See also ==
- Communes of the Vendée department
