= La Gaubretière =

- Commune
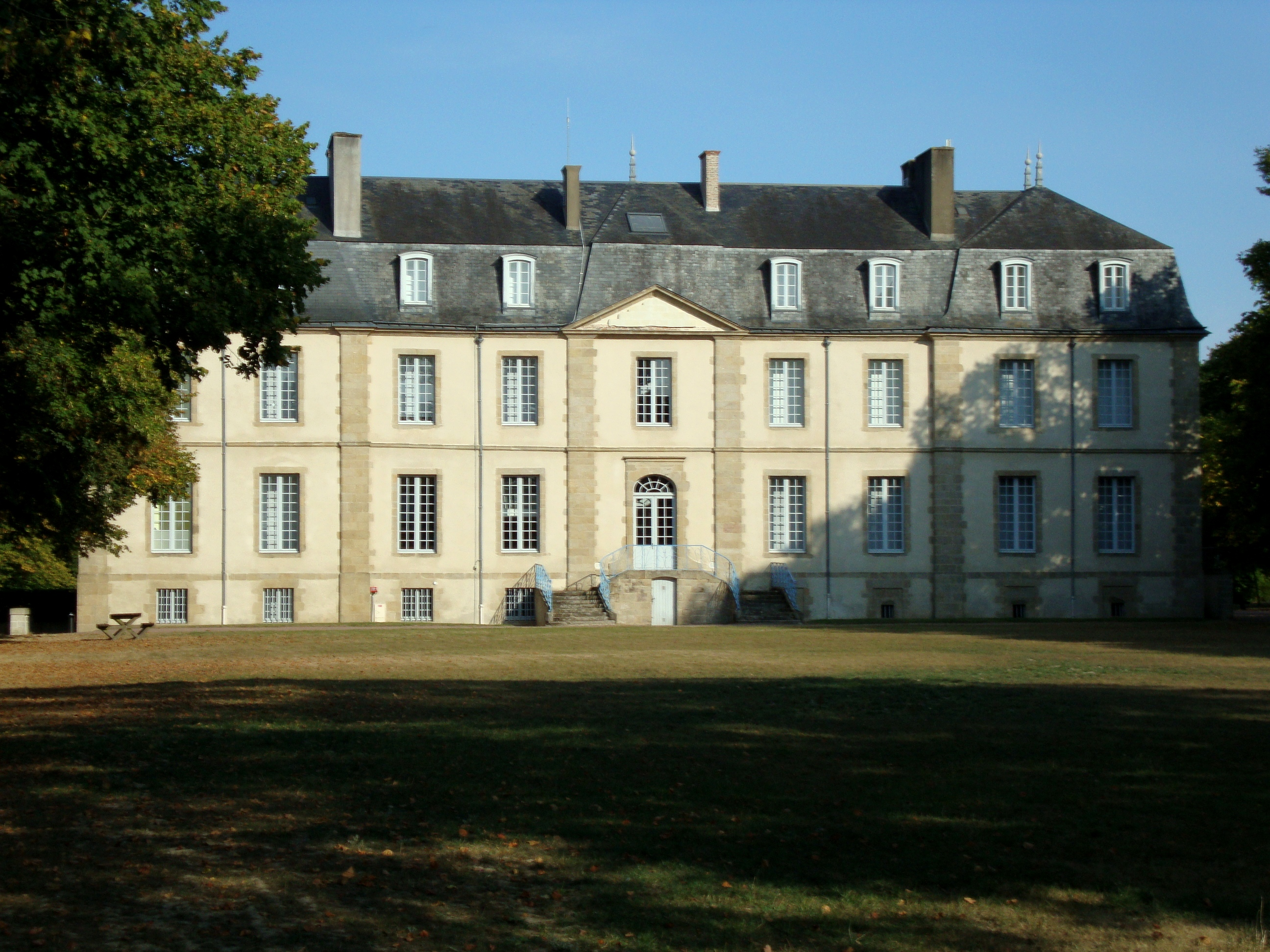
- The Château de Landebaudière

- Coat of arms
- Location of La Gaubretière
- Location within France Location within Pays de la Loire
- Coordinates: 46°56′38″N 1°03′49″W
- Country: France
- Region: Pays de la Loire
- Department: Vendée
- Arrondissement: La Roche-sur-Yon
- Canton: Mortagne-sur-Sèvre
- Intercommunality: Pays de Mortagne

Government
  - Mayor (2020–2026): Marie-Thérèse Pluchon
- Area^{1}: 30.33 km^{2} (11.71 sq mi)
- Elevation: 146 m (479 ft)
- Highest elevation: 203 m (666 ft)
- Lowest elevation: 90 m (300 ft)
- Population (2023): 3,225
  - Density: 106.3/km^{2} (275.4/sq mi)
- Time zone: UTC+01:00 (CET)
  - Summer (DST): UTC+02:00 (CEST)
- INSEE/Postal code: 85097 /85130
- ^{1} French Land Register data, which excludes lakes, ponds, glaciers > 1 km^{2} (0.386 sq mi or 247 acres) and river estuaries.

La Gaubretière (French pronunciation: [la ɡobʁətjɛʁ]) is a commune in the Vendée department in the Pays de la Loire region in western France.

== Population ==
Historical population
Year	Pop.	±% p.a.
1968	2,063	—
1975	2,196	+0.90%
1982	2,432	+1.47%
1990	2,547	+0.58%
1999	2,571	+0.10%
2007	2,802	+1.08%
2012	2,984	+1.27%
2017	3,060	+0.50%
2023	3,225	+0.88%
Source: INSEE

== See also ==
- Communes of the Vendée department
