= Saint-Vincent-Sterlanges =

- Commune
- Coat of arms
- Location of Saint-Vincent-Sterlanges
- Location within France Location within Pays de la Loire
- Coordinates: 46°44′31″N 1°05′10″W
- Country: France
- Region: Pays de la Loire
- Department: Vendée
- Arrondissement: La Roche-sur-Yon
- Canton: Chantonnay
- Intercommunality: Pays de Chantonnay

Government
  - Mayor (2020–2026): Valérie Tonarelli
- Area^{1}: 4.46 km^{2} (1.72 sq mi)
- Highest elevation: 84 m (276 ft)
- Lowest elevation: 48 m (157 ft)
- Population (2023): 747
  - Density: 167/km^{2} (434/sq mi)
- Time zone: UTC+01:00 (CET)
  - Summer (DST): UTC+02:00 (CEST)
- INSEE/Postal code: 85276 /85110
- ^{1} French Land Register data, which excludes lakes, ponds, glaciers > 1 km^{2} (0.386 sq mi or 247 acres) and river estuaries.

Saint-Vincent-Sterlanges (French pronunciation: [sɛ̃ vɛ̃sɑ̃ stɛʁlɑ̃ʒ]) is a commune in the Vendée department in the Pays de la Loire region in western France.

== Geography ==
Saint-Vincent-Sterlanges lies in the Vendée département at thirty kilometers far from La Roche-sur-Yon. Le Petit Lay flaws in Saint-Vincent-Sterlanges and forms the coastal river le Lay by meeting le Grand Lay in Chantonnay.

== See also ==
- Communes of the Vendée department
