= Charles Sapinaud de La Rairie =

French royalist military officer (1760–1829)

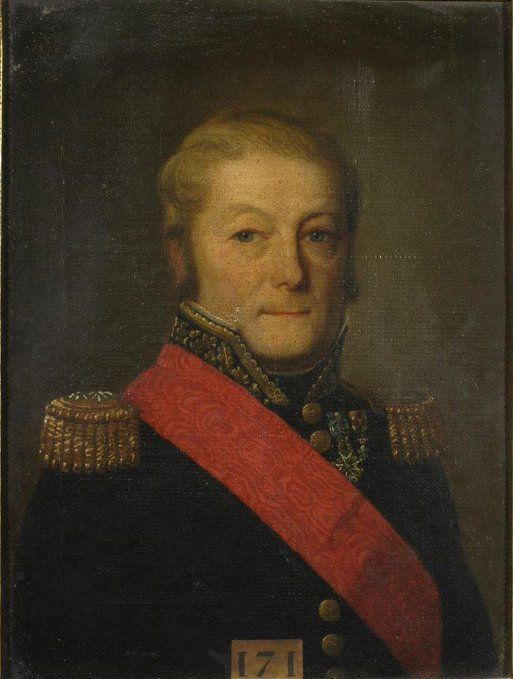
- Born: 30 November 1760; La Gaubretière
- Died: 12 July 1829 (aged 68); La Gaubretière
- Military career
- Allegiance: Kingdom of France; Véndéens; Kingdom of France
- Rank: Lieutenant-General
- Conflicts: War in the Vendée; Virée de Galerne; Battle of Legé; Battle of Saint-Colombin; Battle of Chaudron-en-Mauges; War in the Vendée of 1815; Battle of Aizenay
- Awards: Order of Saint Louis; Pair de France

Charles Henri Félicité Sapinaud de la Rairie (French pronunciation: [ʃaʁl ɑ̃ʁi felisite sapino də la ʁɛʁi]; December 30, 1760 - August 12, 1829) was a French soldier and Vendéen general during the war in the Vendée.

== Life ==
Sapinaud was born in La Gaubretière. In 1778, he enlisted as cadet gentilhomme in the Foix regiment (later renamed 83rd infantry regiment). He resigned from the army in 1789 as a lieutenant, and retired to his lands at La Gaubretière where he was elected mayor.

In March 1793, the war in the Vendée broke loose and Sapinaud joined the insurgents serving under his uncle Charles Sapinaud de La Verrie, himself under the orders of Charles de Royrand, chief general of the Vendéens of the Catholic and Royal army of the Centre which originated from the east side of the Vendée department. Sapinaud de la Verrie was killed on 25 July 1793 near Chantonnay; Sapinaud de La Rairie succeeded him.

In October, Sapinaud followed the Vendéen army during the Virée de Galerne, yet he was separated from the army at the Battle of Le Mans on December 13, 1793. Lost after the routing, he managed to gain military Vendée.

Royrand died on November 5 after sicknesses and wounds, Sapinaud hence led the Catholic and Royal Army of the centre and fought the infernal columns during the first months of 1794. Along with François de Charette, Jean-Nicolas Stofflet and Gaspard de Bernard de Marigny, he was one of the main Vendéen generals.

In April 1794, the four generals who were until then fighting separately, signed a treaty of assistance. Yet Charette and Stofflet quickly got into disputes with Marigny who decided to part from the army. A military court thus condemned Marigny to death but Sapinaud refused to vote for his execution. Marigny was eventually shot by Stofflet's men on July 10, 1794.

By the end of 1794, the Vendéens and Republicans negotiated and signed the Treaty of La Jaunaye that Sapinaud signed with Charette of February 17, 1795. The fragile peace was broken a few months later and Sapinaud joined the war once more on October 3, 1795. His troops were greatly diminished, and Stofflet was executed by the Republicans on February 25, 1796, followed by Charette on March 29. Sapinaud, then leading only a few dozen men, signed the peace in Nantes at the end of January 1796.

He married in 1797 with Marie-Louise Charette.

The war resumed on October 15, 1799, and Sapinaud retook the command of his army, yet on November 9 the coup of 18 Brumaire which overthrew the French Directory disconcerted the Vendéens and Chouans who begin negotiations in December. The peace conditions proposed by Napoleon Bonaparte divided the chouan and Vendéen generals, but Sapinaud sided for peace. He signed for peace on January 18, 1800.

In 1814, Napoleon was defeated and the monarchy was restored. Sapinaud was named lieutenant-general.

Sapinaud took up arms during the Hundred Days, during the War in the Vendée and Chouannerie of 1815. After the death of Louis du Vergier de La Rochejaquelein, Sapinaud succeeded him on June 10, 1815, at the head of the Catholic and Royal Army of Vendée, yet he resigned after a few days and named Charles d'Autichamp as his successor. After the defeat of the Vendéens at the battle of Rocheservière, Sapinaud sided again for peace.

After the Second Restoration, Sapinaud became a duke and Pair de France. He died on August 12, 1829, at La Gaubretière.

== Sources ==
- Émile Gabory, Les Guerres de Vendée, Robert Laffont, édition de 2009, p. 1443.
