= Amédée-François-Paul de Béjarry =

French politician

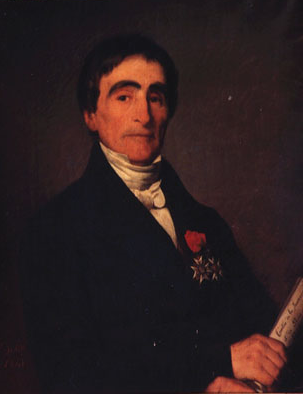
- Born: 25 January 1770; Luçon, Vendée, France
- Died: 10 May 1844 (aged 74); Nantes, Loire-Atlantique, France
- Occupation: Politician

Amédée-François-Paul de Béjarry (1770–1844) was a French politician. He served as a member of the Chamber of Deputies from 1816 to 1818, representing Vendée.
