= Roger Dupuy =

French historian and academic (1934–2025)

- Born: 19 January 1934
- Died: 2 July 2025 (aged 91)
- Education: Paris 1 Panthéon-Sorbonne University
- Occupation(s): Historian; Academic

Roger Dupuy (French: [ʁɔʒe dypɥi]; 19 January 1934 – 2 July 2025) was a French historian and academic. He specialised in politics of the 18th and 19th centuries. Dupuy died on 2 July 2025, at the age of 91.

== Publications ==
- La Garde nationale et les débuts de la Révolution en Ille-et-Vilaine (1789-mars 1793) (1972)
- De la Révolution à la chouannerie (1988)
- Pouvoir local et Révolution, 1780-1850. La frontière intérieure (1993)
- Pour une République sans Révolution (1995)
- "La Vie Quotidienne" (1997)
- Aux origines idéologiques de la Révolution, journaux et pamphlets à Rennes (1788-1789)
- La Politique du peuple. Racines, permanences et ambigüités du populisme (2002)
- La Bretagne sous la Révolution et l’Empire, 1789-1815 (2004)
- Nouvelle histoire de la France contemporaine, t. 2 : La République jacobine : Terreur, guerre et gouvernement révolutionnaire, 1792-1794 (2005)
- La Garde nationale entre nation et peuple en armes : mythes et réalités (2006)
