= Joseph Niou =

- Born: 6 January 1749; Rochefort, France
- Died: May 30, 1823 (aged 74); Paris, France
- Occupations: Engineer, politician
- Known for: Political activism following the French Revolution

Joseph Niou (6 January 1749, at Rochefort – 30 May 1823, in Paris) was a marine engineer and politician of the French Revolution, serving as the director of shipbuilding.

== Life ==
Niou was apprenticed as an engineer/builder on 17 May 1766.

He supported the Revolution and was elected mayor of Rochefort in 1790. He was elected a deputy of the Legislative Assembly in 1791 and then reelected to the National Convention for the department of Charente-Inférieure in 1792. He voted for the execution of King Louis XVI.

He was sent as représentant en mission to the French Mediterranean Fleet, serving at the ports of Lorient and Bayonne to reinforce the defences, and then in the Department de Nord and the Pas-de-Calais to enforce the Law of Suspects; at Saint-Omer and at Dunkerque, he arrested and tried 15 people before the Revolutionary Tribunal. In 1794, he was ordered to reorganise the powder mills at Grenelle in Paris, and was then placed in control of the arming of the Navy. After the Thermidorian Reaction, he was named Représentant to the Mediterranean Fleet. He was present at Toulon during a rebellion, and with the fleet at the Battle of the Hyères Islands where a ship was lost.

Following the establishment of the French Directory, Niou was elected to the Council of Ancients until Prairial, Year VI (June 1797). He was then named director of naval construction at Lorient. After the establishment of the French Consulate in 1799 he was named to the prize court. On 13 September 1798, Niou was a commissioner for the prisoners of war, and traveled to London to sign an agreement for a prisoner exchange.

As a regicide of Louis XVI he fled France in 1816 following the Bourbon Restoration, living in exile in Belgium until he returned in 1817.

== Family ==
Joseph Niou was the brother of Gaston Niou, Provost Marshal of Rochefort.

He was married on 13 October 1772 at La Rochelle to Madeleine-Louise Moyne, born in Saint-Domingue, the daughter of André-Paul Moyne, a lawyer. He had two sons who served in the Grande armée, and both were killed in action. Louis-Gaston Niou, born at Rochefort on 18 January 1775, was a captain in the 19e régiment de chasseurs à cheval, who was killed at Trier, aged 19, while serving as an aide de camp to General George Joseph Dufour, during action against Austrian cavalry. From his marriage to Denise Demareuil, he had a son, Joseph-Louis-Gaston Niou, who died in Paris during 1806.
