= Eiffel Tower replicas and derivatives =

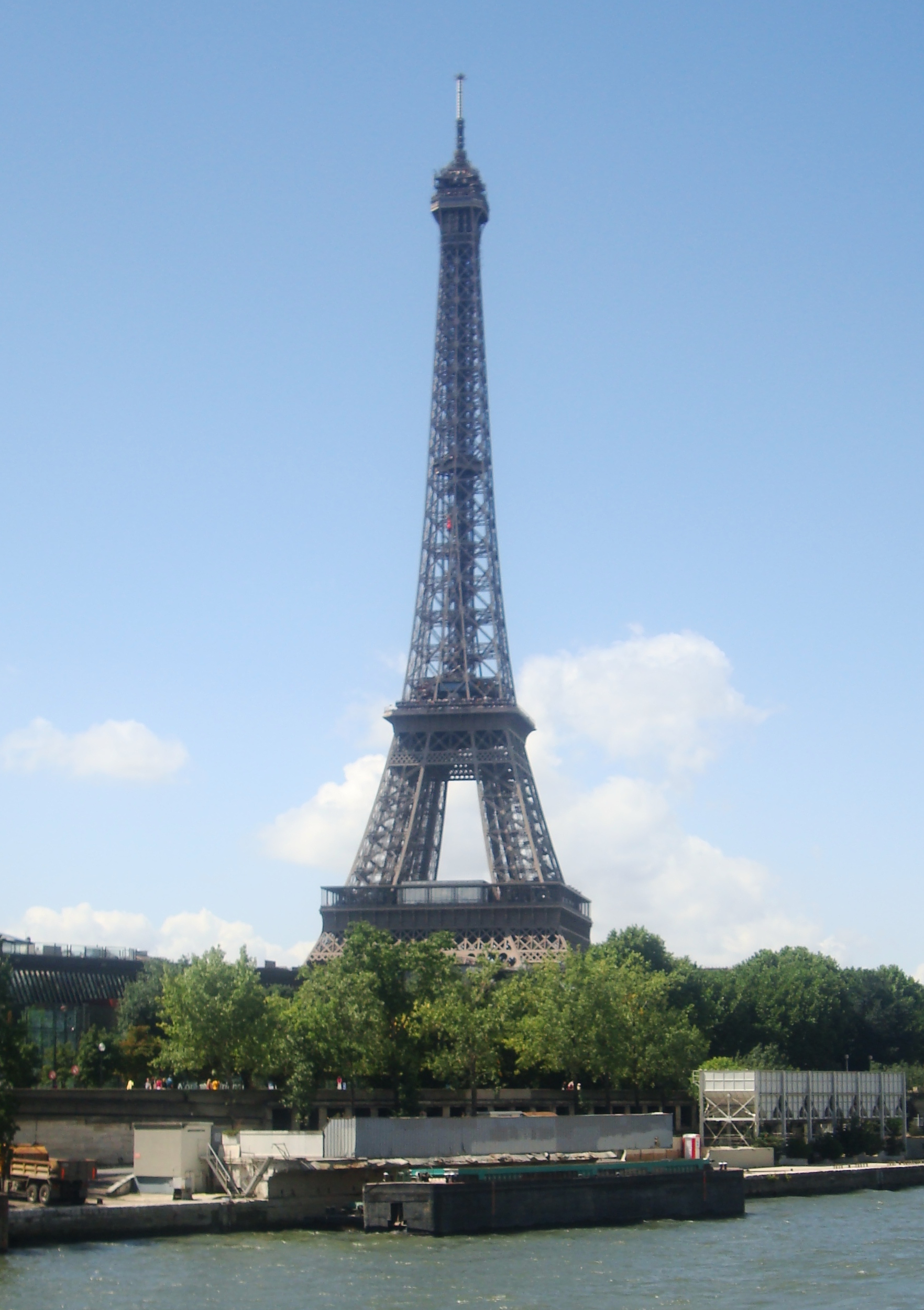
The original Eiffel Tower in Paris. This article discusses replicas and derivatives of this building.

As one of the most iconic and recognizable structures in the world, the Eiffel Tower, completed in 1889, has been the inspiration for the creation of over 50 similar towers around the world. Most are not exact replicas, though there are many that resemble it closely, while others look slightly different. The Eiffel Tower has also inspired other towers that are not close resembling replicas and therefore are not listed here, for example the Blackpool Tower.

== Replicas of known height ==
The tower is 330 metres (1,083 ft) tall. Other Eiffel-inspired towers are listed in the table in descending order of scale and height, imperial measurements rounded to the nearest foot:

Name	Country	Location	Height	Scale	Coordinates	Notes	Image
Watkin's Tower	United Kingdom	Wembley, Greater London	358 m (1,175 ft) planned height	1:1 scale	51°33′20″N 0°16′46″W	Never completed: construction begun in 1891, demolished in 1907.	
Dragon Tower	China	Harbin, Heilongjiang	336 m (1,102 ft)	1:1 scale	45°44′45.55″N 126°40′28″E	Communication tower	
Tokyo Tower	Japan	Minato, Tokyo	332.5 m (1,091 ft)	1:1 scale	35°39′31″N 139°44′44″E	Its architect also designed the Sapporo TV Tower	
Nagoya TV Tower	Japan	Nagoya	180 m (591 ft)	1:2 scale	35°10′20″N 136°54′30″E	Though principally a communications tower, it also features two restaurants and an open-air observation deck; completed in 1954	
New Brighton Tower	United Kingdom	New Brighton, Merseyside	173 m (568 ft)	1:2 scale	53°26′12.37″N 3°02′11.03″W	Completed by 1900, demolished by 1921	
Las Vegas Eiffel Tower	United States	Paradise, Nevada	164.6 m (540 ft)	1:2 scale	36°6′45″N 115°10′20″W	Paris Las Vegas hotel/casino on the Las Vegas Strip	
Ismaning Radio Tower	Germany	Ismaning, Bavaria	163 m (535 ft)	1:2 scale	48°15′1″N 11°45′0″E	Wooden radio tower used for medium wave broadcasting. Demolished in 1983	
Funkturm Berlin	Germany	Berlin	150 m (492 ft)	1:2 scale	52°30′18.2″N 13°16′41.45″E	Broadcasting tower built 1924 and 1926, no longer functions as such; civic landmark featuring restaurant and observation deck	
The Parisian	Macau	Cotai Strip, Macau	150 m (492 ft)	1:2 scale	22.14364°N 113.56283°E	Completed and opened on 13 September 2016	
Eiffel Tower	China	Shenzhen	108 m (354 ft)	1:3 scale	22°32′13.33″N 113°58′9.51″E	Dominant structure at Window of the World, a collection of nearly 130 reproductions of famous tourist attractions, opened 1993	
Eiffel Tower of Tianducheng Community	China	Hangzhou	108 m (354 ft)	1:3 scale	30°23′6.72″N 120°14′36.60″E	Central feature of Tianducheng, a Paris-themed housing development, home to some 50,000 people	
Eiffel Tower	United States	Mason, Ohio	101 m (331 ft) (approximately)	1:3 scale	39°20′36″N 84°16′1″W	Kings Island amusement park	
Eiffel Tower	United States	Doswell, Virginia	101 m (331 ft) (approximately)	1:3 scale	37°50′23″N 77°26′43″W	Kings Dominion amusement park	
Metallic tower of Fourvière	France	Lyon	101 m (331 ft)	1:4 scale	45°45′49.57″N 4°49′20.16″E	Built between 1892 and 1894 as observation tower; now used solely for communications.	
Eiffel Tower replica in Bahria Town Lahore	Pakistan	Bahria Town Lahore. Lahore	80 m (262 ft)	1:4 scale	31°21′20.83″N 74°11′5.27″E	Constructed in 2014 as a focal point for a housing estate	
Eiffel Tower replica in Bahria Town Karachi	Pakistan	Bahria Town Karachi, Karachi	80 m (262 ft)	1:4 scale	25°8′11.52″N 67°21′0.77″E	Construction started in 2019 and opened for public visits on 31 December 2020.	
Torre del Reformador	Guatemala	Guatemala City	75 m (246 ft)	1:5 scale	14°36′46.9″N 90°31′0.49″W	Erected in 1935	
Tsūtenkaku ("Tower Reaching Heaven")	Japan	Osaka	64 m (210 ft)	1:6 scale	34°39′08″N 135°30′22″E	At Luna Park; destroyed by fire 1945, replaced with a different design	
Petřín Lookout Tower	Czech Republic	Prague	63.5 m (208 ft)	1:6 scale	50°05′0.76″N 14°23′42.18″E	Built in 1891 as an observation tower with octagonal plan; now also used for communications.	
Torre Eiffel	Mexico	Gómez Palacio, Durango	58 m (190 ft) (approximately)	1:6 scale	25°32′59.50″N 103°28′44.68″W	Donated by the French-speaking community of Gómez Palacio in 2007	
Eiffel Tower	Romania	Slobozia	54 m (177 ft)	1:6 scale	44°33′27″N 27°19′59″E	Erected as part of a private tourist complex	
Eiffel Tower	Russia	Parizh, Chelyabinsk Oblast	50 m (164 ft)	1:6 scale	53°17′51.02″N 60°5′59.46″E	Built by South Ural Cell Telephone company as a cellphone tower	
AWA Tower	Australia	Sydney, New South Wales	46 m (151 ft)	1:6 scale	33°52′1″S 151°12′20″E	Communications tower sits atop 12-story building, completed in 1939	
Bordeaux Tower	United States	Fayetteville, North Carolina	45 m (148 ft) (approximately)	1:6 scale	35°1′48″N 78°55′50″W	Built as part of a shopping center	
Copenhagen Zoo Tower	Denmark	Copenhagen	43.5 m (143 ft)	1:6 scale	55°40′19.16″N 12°31′24.70″E	Built in 1905, it is one of the world's tallest observation towers built of wood	
Eiffel Tower	Colombia	Sabaneta	42 m (137 ft) (approximately)	1:7 scale	6°08'56.9"N 75°36'33.2"W	Built within the Paris residential unit, in the municipality of Sabaneta.	
Tour d'Eiffel de Fes	Morocco	Fez	39 m (128 ft)	1:9 scale		Built in 2012 to honor the bond between the cities of Fez and Paris, but reported to have been removed in 2016	
Eiffel Tower in Pojana Maggiore	Italy	Pojana Maggiore, Vicenza	38.0 m (125 ft)	1:9 scale (approximately)	45.316142916775775°N 11.504182897885602°E	Built in 1999, by a local laser cut company	
Bamboo Eiffel Tower	Indonesia	Tasikmalaya Regency	36 m (118 ft) (approximately)	1:9 scale (approximately)		Bamboo structure, in honor of the coronation of Queen Wilhelmina; designed by A. H. van Bebber	
Eiffel Tower	Ukraine	Kharkiv	35 m (115 ft)	1:9 scale (approximately)	49°59′23.91″N 36°17′21.91″E	Associated with a French-themed shopping mall.	
Eyffela	France	Chambretaud, Chanverrie	33 m (108 ft)	1:10 scale	46°55′20″N 0°57′45″W	Built to put Chambretaud on the map and to attract tourists from nearby Puy du Fou. Material: iron; weight: 32 tons.	
Golden Sands Eiffel Tower	Bulgaria	Varna	32.4 m (106 ft)	1:10 scale (approximately)	43°17′3.91″N 28°2′39.08″E	Built in the resort town as a tourist attraction	
Malayer Eiffel Tower	Iran	Malayer, Hamadan	32 m (105 ft) (approximately)	1:10 scale	34°18′58″N 48°48′59″E	Malayer mini world with 138 historical monuments (under construction)	
Paris Center Eiffel Tower	Israel	Netivot	32 m (105 ft)	1:10 scale	31°25′3.05″N 34°35′41.6″E	Situated at Paris (Shriki) Center in the southern city of Netivot.	
Eiffel Tower	Spain	Parque Europa, Torrejón de Ardoz, Madrid	30.4 m (100 ft)	1:10 scale (approximately)	40°26′22.8″N 3°27′35.2″W	Completed in 2010; part of an $18m replica theme park.	
Kish Eiffel Tower	Iran	Kish Island	30 m (98 ft)	1:10 scale	26°32′13″N 54°01′14″E	Completed in September 2018 in Pardis 1 Shopping Center.	
Umuarama Eiffel Tower	Brazil	Umuarama	30 m (98 ft)	1:10 scale	23°50′3″S 53°21′25″W		
Eiffel Tower	Belarus	Paryž, Vitebsk Oblast	30 m (98 ft) (approximately)	1:10 scale (approximately)	55.156038°N 27.385659°E	Has a cross at its top. Designed by ksyondz (Catholic minister) Yuosaz Bulka. Has a sculpture of Mary Magdalene and 2 sculptures of angels nearby.	
Eiffel Tower	Uzbekistan	Samarkand	30 m (98 ft) (approximately)	1:10 scale	39.6608913°N 66.9077280°E	Sogdian Park.	
Filiatra Eiffel Tower	Greece	Filiatra, Messinia	26 m (85 ft)	1:18 scale	37.1621591°N 21.5829313°E	At the entrance of the village, donated in 1960 by Charalambos Fournarakis	
Eiffel Tower	United States	Epcot theme park, Lake Buena Vista, Florida	23 m (75 ft)	1:14 scale (1:10)	28°22′6.86″N 81°33′11.89″W	Part of the France Pavilion at Epcot, Walt Disney World; opened in 1982	
Monte Amiata Summit Cross	Italy	Amiata	22 m (72 ft)	1:15 scale	42°53′16.59″N 11°37′30.08″E	Summit cross	
Paris, Texas Eiffel Tower	United States	Paris, Texas	20 m (66 ft)	1:16 scale	33°38′23.52″N 95°31′25.92″W	Tower constructed in 1993; the hat was added in 1998	
Eiffel Tower (Paris, Tennessee)	United States	Paris, Tennessee	18.25 m (60 ft) (approximately)	1:20 scale	36°17′12.94″N 88°18′5.41″W	Dedicated on 29 January 1993	
Kyiv's Eiffel Tower	Ukraine	Kyiv	16 m (52 ft)	1:20 scale	50.417645°N 30.529050°E	Built as a part of residential complex "French quartal" in 2015	
Rybnik's Eiffel Tower	Poland	Rybnik	15 m (49 ft)	1:22 scale	50.070198°N 18.518286°E	Built on the roundabout in the neighborhood that had been locally known as "Paris" (Polish: Paryż) in 2022.	
Krasnoyarsk Eiffel Tower	Russia	Krasnoyarsk	14.8 m (49 ft)	1:22 scale	56.038056°N 92.911944°E		
Milwaukee School of Engineering Eiffel Tower	United States	Milwaukee, Wisconsin	13 m (43 ft)	1:25 scale		Temporary model designed and erected by Milwaukee School of Engineering students for the annual Bastille Days festival in Cathedral Square Park for four days every July	
Europe Eiffel Tower	Belgium	Brussels	12.96 m (42.5 ft)	1:25 scale	50°53′39.44″N 4°20′21.16″E	Mini-Europe	
Green Lake City Eiffel Tower	Indonesia	Tangerang	12 m (39 ft)	1:25 scale	6°10′49.8″S 106°42′19.5″E	Located in the residential area of Green Lake City	
Kabardinka Eiffel Tower	Russia	Kabardinka	12 m (39 ft)	1:25 scale	44.6497327°N 37.9316336°E	Built in 2014 in the resort town as a tourist attraction	
Kota Eiffel Tower	India	Kota, Rajasthan	12 m (39 ft)	1:25 scale	25.180476°N 75.846518°E	Feature of Seven Wonders Park, Kota	
Eiffel Tower	Japan	Tochigi Prefecture	12 m (39 ft)	1:25 scale	36.806637°N 139.712172°E	At Tobu World Square. The park also has a replica of the Tokyo Tower.	
Brisbane Eiffel Tower	Australia	Brisbane, Queensland	12 m (39 ft) (approximately)	1:25 scale	27.470686°S 153.004690°E	Landmark among the sidewalk tables of La Dolce Vita café on Park Rd, Milton which offers Italian cuisine.	
Minimundus	Austria	Klagenfurt	12 m (39 ft)	1:25 scale	46°37′11″N 14°15′52″E	Part of a miniature park	
Phú sinh cát tường Eiffel Tower	Vietnam	Long An province	11 m (36 ft)	1:30 scale	10.900408°N 106.461936°E	Part of a miniature park, 7 Wonders of the World	
Meccano model	United States	Atlanta, Georgia	11 m (36 ft)	1:30 scale		SciTrek technology museum. No longer exists; museum closed in 2004.	
Bauru Eiffel Tower	Brazil	Bauru	10 m (33 ft) (approximately)	1:30 scale	22.32515°S 49.0923627°W	Built in 1978 to commemorate the 25th anniversary of the foundation of the Bauru School of Law at the Instituição Toledo de Ensino.	
Taastrup Eiffel Tower	Denmark	Taastrup	10 m (33 ft)	1:30 scale	55°39′0″N 12°17′21″E	Built to celebrate the 2022 Tour de France starting in Copenhagen.	
Montmartre Eiffel Tower	Canada	Montmartre, Saskatchewan	8.5 m (28 ft)	1:38 scale	50.221147°N 103.448703°W	Erected in 2009. Settled by French immigrants, the community calls itself "Paris of the Prairies".	
Valday Eiffel Tower	Russia	Valday, Novgorod Oblast	8 m (26 ft)	1:40 scale	57.975785°N 33.267781°E	Built in 2018	
Dreyfus Eiffel Tower	United States	Austin, Texas	7.5 m (25 ft)	1:45 scale	30.283898°N 97.751773°W	Current location unknown. Formerly located at Dreyfus Antique Shop, 1901 N. Lamar Blvd., but removed in early 2010s.	
Paris, Michigan Eiffel Tower	United States	Paris, Michigan	7 m (23 ft) (approximately)	1:50 scale	43.788287°N 85.500514°W	Situated in a park	
Santos Dumont Eiffel Tower Replica	Brazil	Santos Dumont, Minas Gerais	7 m (23 ft)	1:50 scale	21.455859°S 43.552000°W	Built in 2001 to celebrate the centennial anniversary of the flight of Alberto Santos-Dumont around the Eiffel Tower. Santos Dumont is now the name of his birthplace in Brazil. It was formerly known as Palmira.	
La Fayette Village	United States	Raleigh, North Carolina	6.0 m (20 ft)	1:50 scale	35° 53' 41.9136" N, W 78° 37' 19.2036" W	built as an homage to the French aesthetic of the shopping center	LaFayette Village Eiffel tower replica, raleigh NC
Eiffel Tower	Russia	Zvenigovo	3.5 m (11 ft)	1:100 scale	55°58′19.056″N 48°0′52.5888″E	Erected in the center of the town's main street.	
Uman Eiffel Tower	Ukraine	Uman	3.25 m (10.7 ft)	1:100 scale	48°45′0″N 30°13′10″E	Situated in a central park	
Eiffel Tower of Nikitin's Gymnasium	Russia	Voronezh	3.24 m (10.6 ft)	1:100 scale	51.6912261°N 39.1837692°E	Situated in the park of Nikitin's Gymnasium	
Eiffel Tower	Azerbaijan	Baku	3 m (10 ft) (approximately)	1:110 scale	40.371932°N 49.844419°E	Sahil Shopping Center, at Parfums de France shop.	

== Replicas of unknown height ==
- Centerpiece of the Falconcity of Wonders - a planned new development project in Dubai, UAE, featuring seven modern wonders of the world (planned). 25°5′43.8″N 55°20′31.5″E (approximate coordinates)
- Model in the First World Plaza shopping mall in Genting Highlands, Malaysia
- Satteldorf near Crailsheim, Germany. On the top of a company building 49°10′55.84″N 10°04′29.41″E
- Apach, France, on the border with Germany and near the border with Luxembourg 49°27′59″N 06°22′18″E
- Da Lat, Vietnam. Designed to be used as Viettel telecommunications tower 11°56′14.12″N 108°26′18.58″E
- Paris, Arkansas, US, at a park situated near the town's center, most likely standing at 25 feet (7.6 m) tall, but not confirmed.
- Guadalajara, Mexico - About 20 metres (66 ft) tall, on a church-esplanade, on Periférico avenue near the Barranca de Oblatos.
- Model next to the Napa County, California Superior Courthouse in Napa, California, US, built in France.
- Sainshand, Mongolia. Painted pink, in the town center 44°53′31.52″N 110°8′19.05″E.
- Culiacán, Sinaloa, Mexico, Paris motel, on the road from Culiacán to Guamuchil 24.837769°N 107.437894°W
- Eiffel Tower in Beijing World Park, Beijing, China near 39.809333°N 116.281°E
- About 2.5 metres (8.2 ft) tall forged sculpture in the Forged Figures Park in Donetsk, Ukraine. 48.016430°N 37.800898°E
- An estimated 28 metres (92 ft) replica existed for a few weeks in Santa Clara, Cuba in 1895.
- The Chinese Army trains on a smaller replica at Zhurire, China.
- Lake Rawa Pening, Indonesia. A bamboo replica situated at the end of a 100 metres (330 ft) bamboo path on the lake. 7°16′33.7″S 110°26′57.8″E
- Gettysburg, Pennsylvania, in the Devonshire Apartment Complex, which occupies the site of the former International Village tourist attraction. 39.7633038°N 77.2674908°W
- A bamboo replica of the Eiffel Tower at the Jaro Plaza in Jaro, Iloilo City, Philippines, was constructed to commemorate the inauguration of the original Eiffel Tower during the 1889 Paris Exposition. 10°43′29.0172″N 122°33′24.6168″E
- Yekaterinoslavka, Khabarovsk Krai, Russia, 47.952315°N 135.123593°E
- Centre Français, Wedding, Berlin, Germany
- Brazil Rio Claro
- Brazil Barra World
- Velika Plana, Serbia, in a private front yard. 44.336126°N 21.060331°E

=== Image gallery ===
These replicas are of unknown height.

See also: Media related to Replicas of the Eiffel Tower at Wikimedia Commons

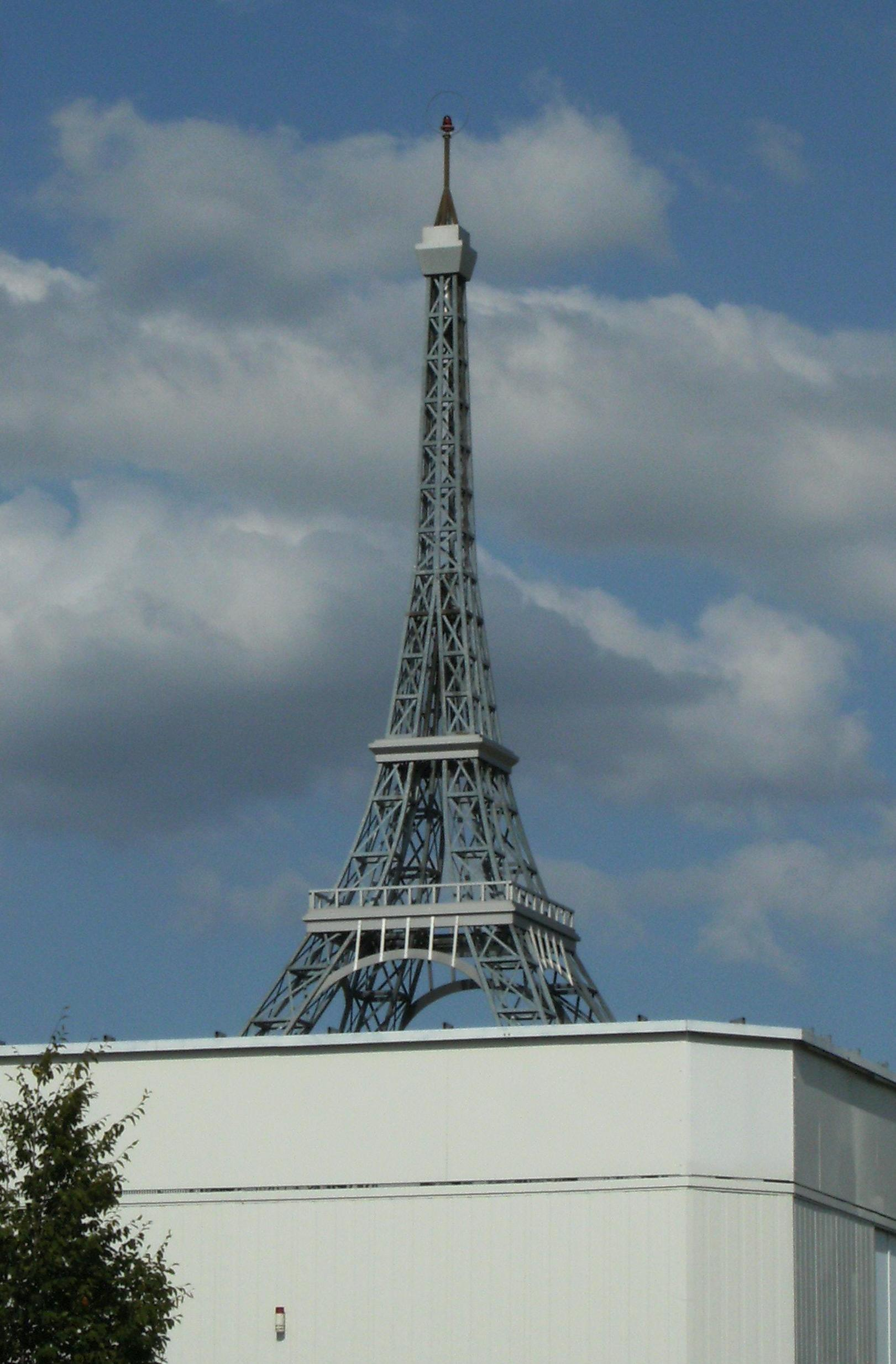
Replica of Eiffel Tower on factory building at Satteldorf near Crailsheim, Germany

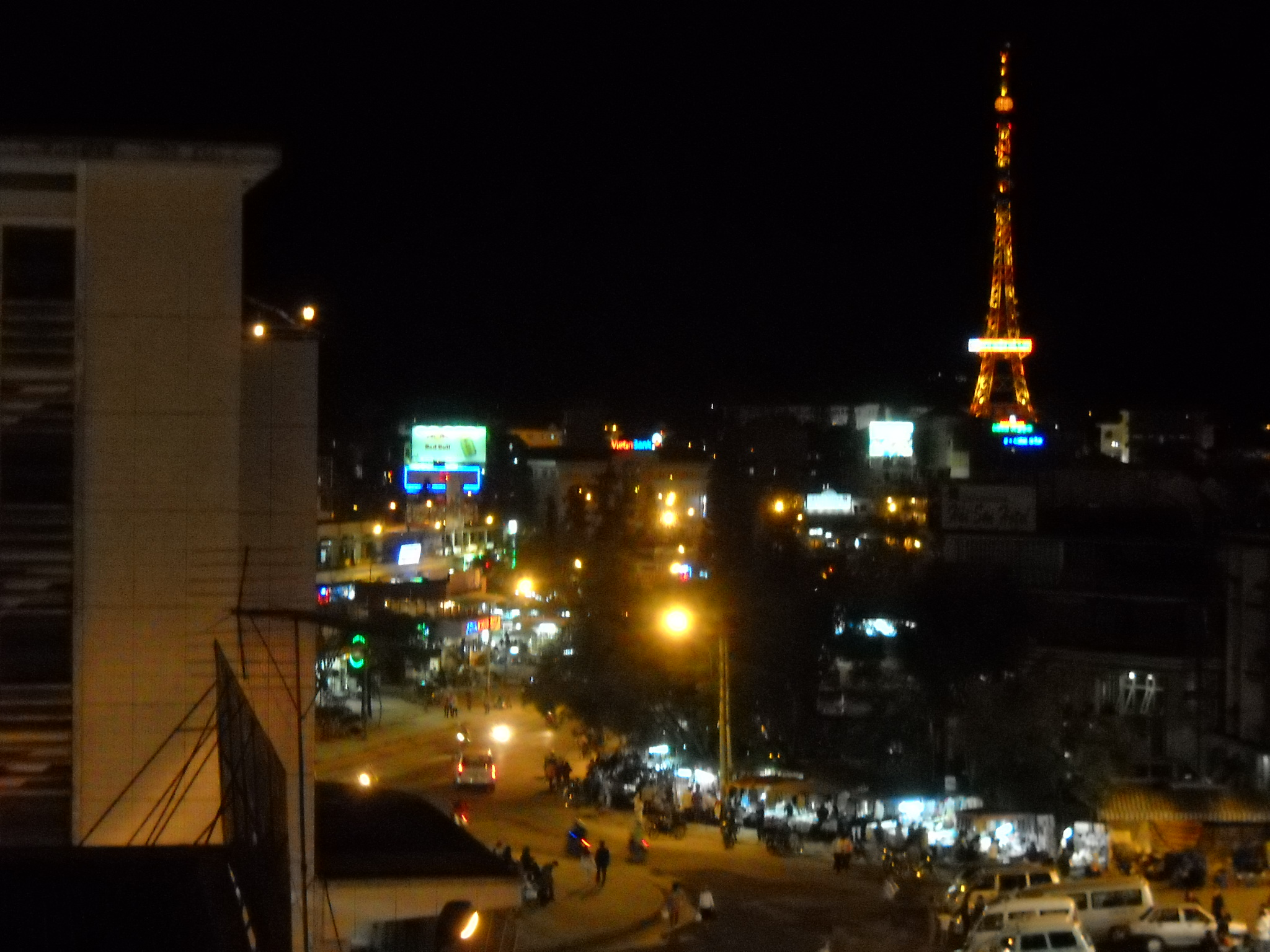
The Eiffel Tower shape telecommunications tower in Da Lat, Vietnam

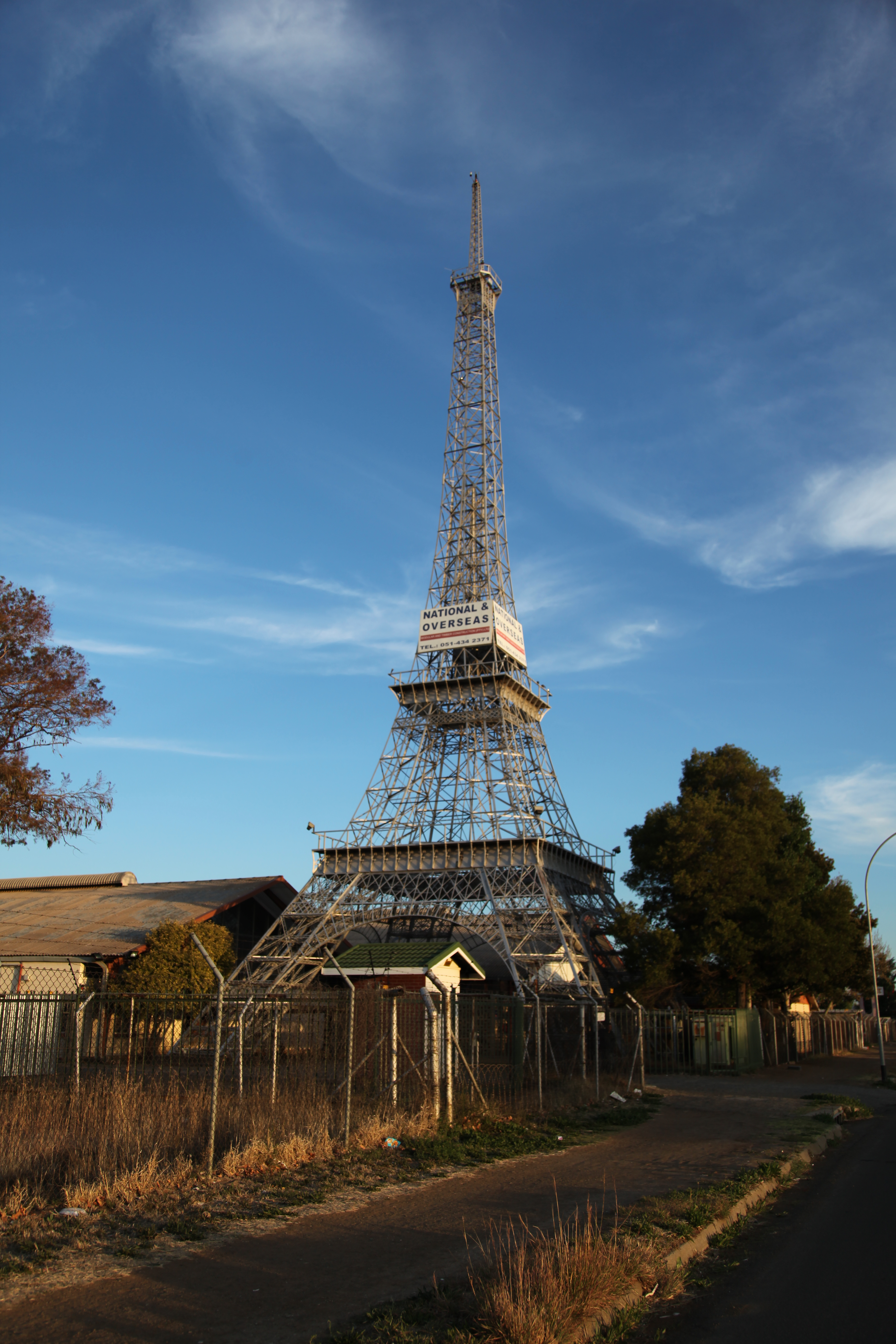
Replica in Bloemfontein, South Africa

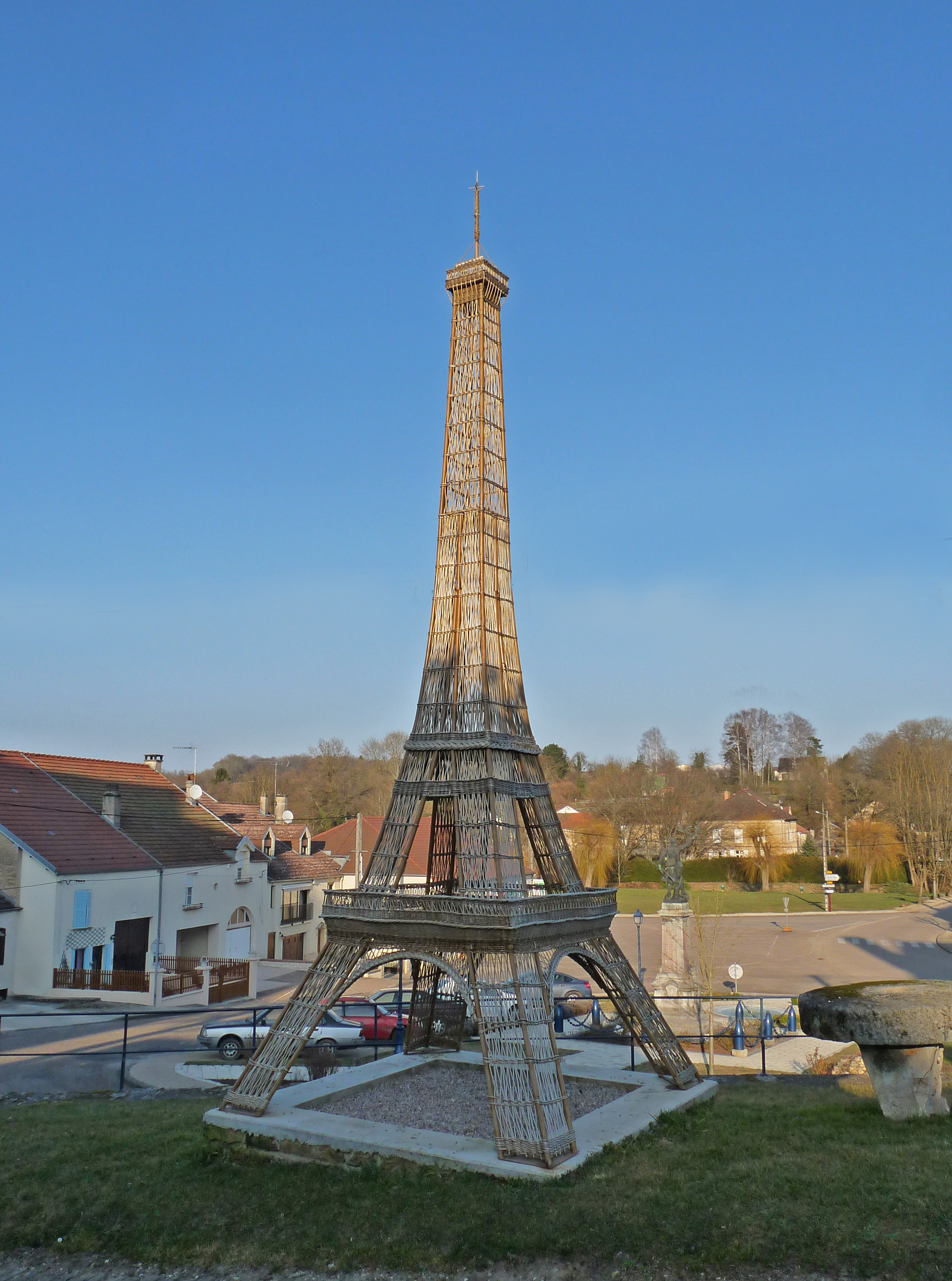
Wicker tower in Bussières-lès-Belmont, France 47.745918°N 5.551164°E

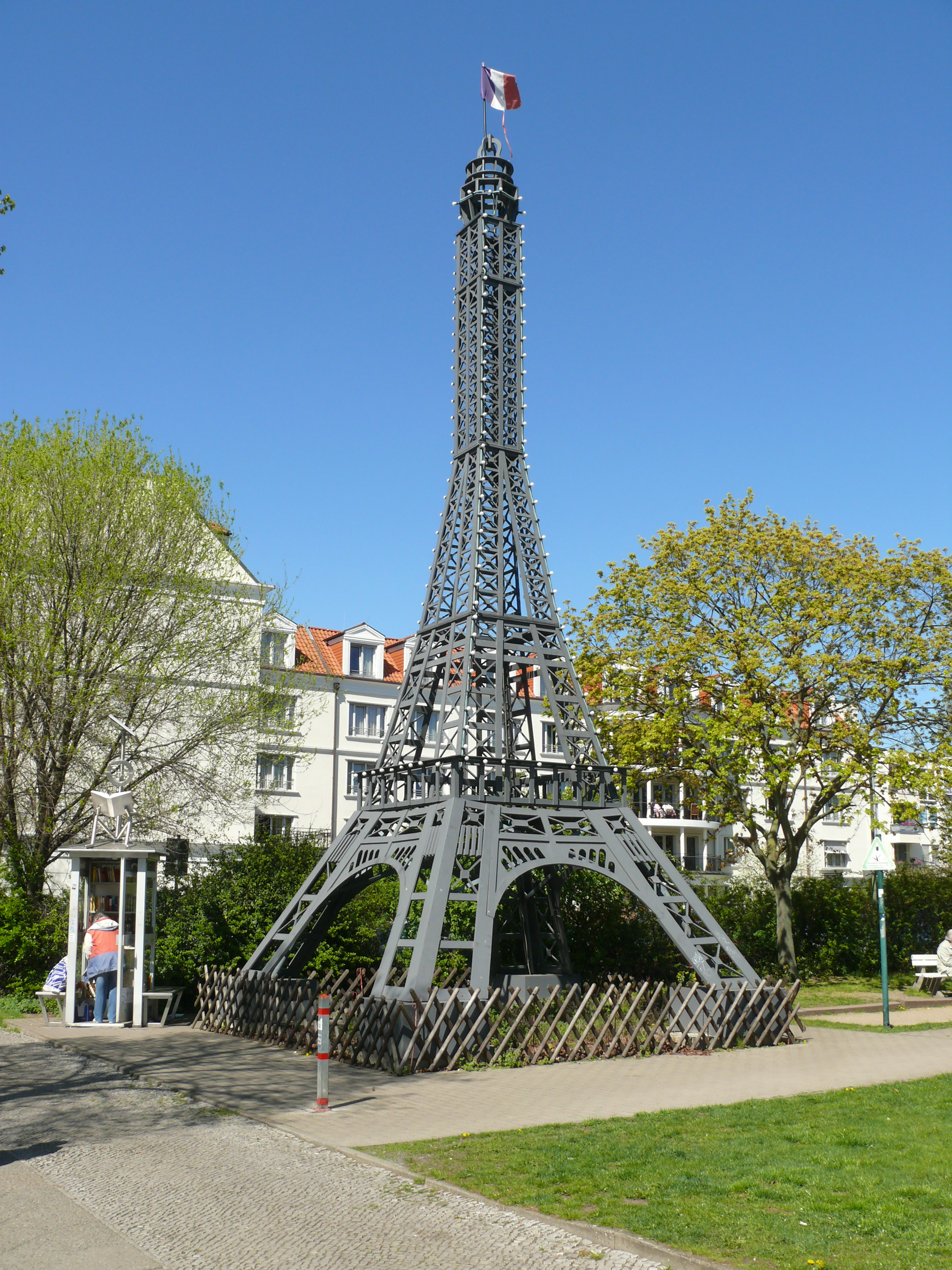
Model at Centre Français de Berlin, Germany

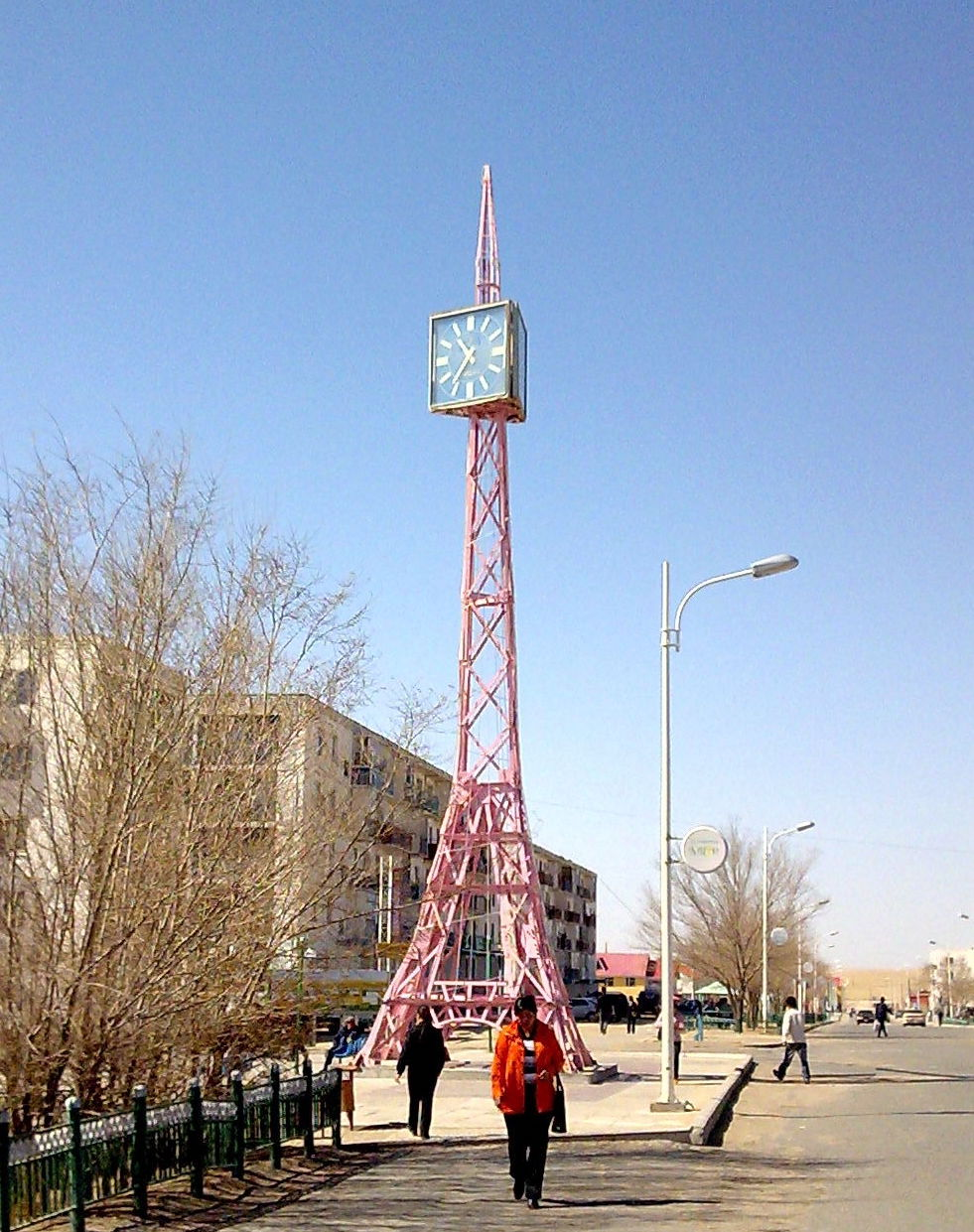
Replica of the Eiffel Tower in Sainshand, Mongolia

== See also ==
- Lattice tower
