= La Verrie =

- Part of Chanverrie
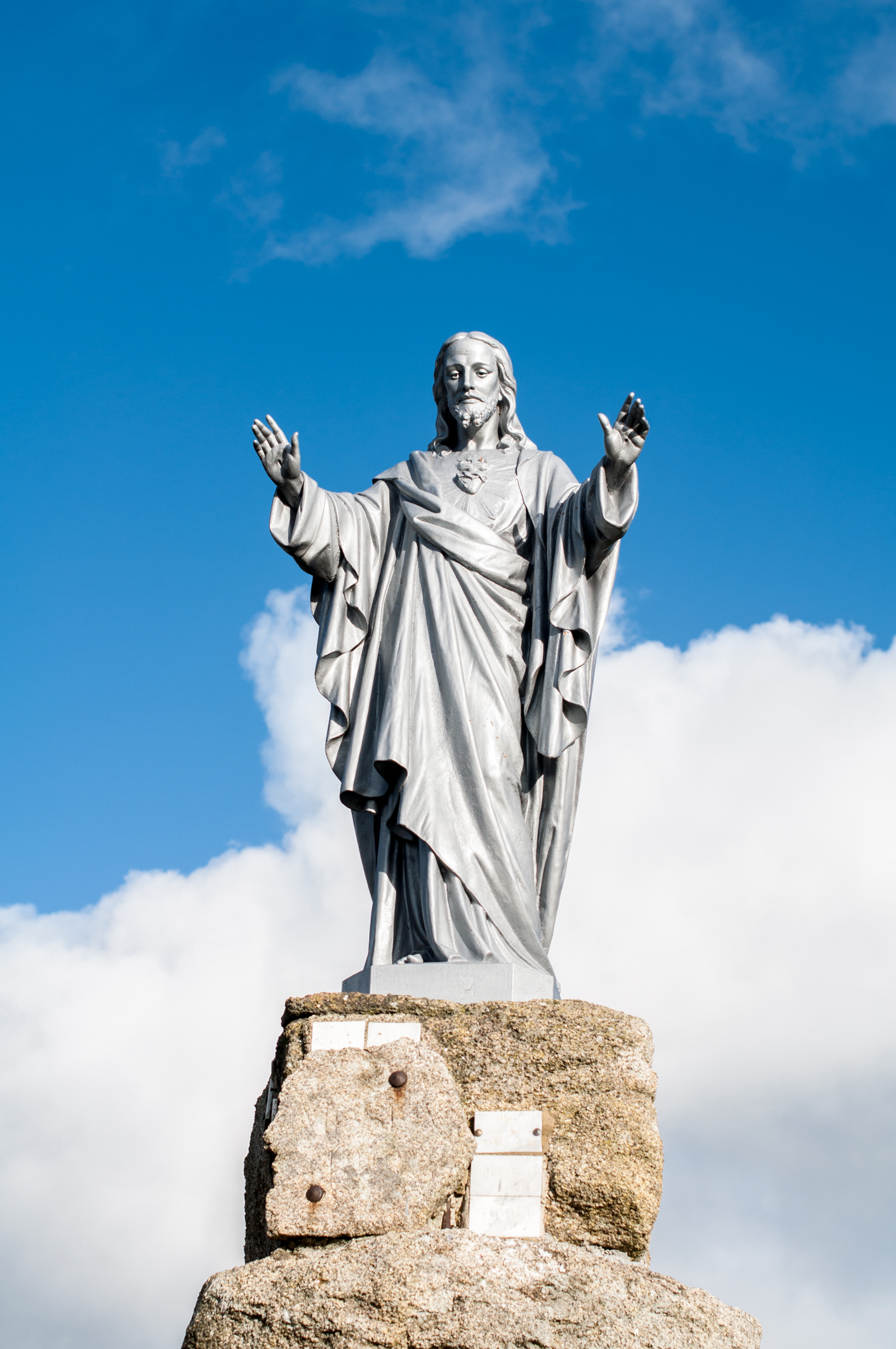
- A statue of Christ, in La Verrie

- Coat of arms
- Location of La Verrie
- Location within France Location within Pays de la Loire
- Coordinates: 46°57′43″N 0°59′38″W
- Country: France
- Region: Pays de la Loire
- Department: Vendée
- Arrondissement: La Roche-sur-Yon
- Canton: Mortagne-sur-Sèvre
- Commune: Chanverrie
- Area^{1}: 43.11 km^{2} (16.64 sq mi)
- Highest elevation: 213 m (699 ft)
- Lowest elevation: 57 m (187 ft)
- Population (2022): 4,016
  - Density: 93.16/km^{2} (241.3/sq mi)
- Time zone: UTC+01:00 (CET)
  - Summer (DST): UTC+02:00 (CEST)
- Postal code: 85130
- ^{1} French Land Register data, which excludes lakes, ponds, glaciers > 1 km^{2} (0.386 sq mi or 247 acres) and river estuaries.

La Verrie is a former commune in the Vendée department in the Pays de la Loire region in western France. On 1 January 2019, it was merged into the new commune Chanverrie.

== See also ==
- Communes of the Vendée department
