= International District =

International District or International Village can refer to:

- Buford Highway community (a.k.a. DeKalb County International Village district) in the Atlanta metro area
- International Village Mall, in Vancouver's Chinatown
- International District (Greater Houston)
- International Village (Gettysburg, Pennsylvania), a defunct shopping center in Gettysburg, Pennsylvania
- Seattle Chinatown-International District
- International District, Albuquerque, New Mexico
- International Village, a residence and dining hall at Northeastern University

== See also ==
- International Villager, 2011 album by Indian rapper Yo Yo Honey Singh
- Pestalozzi International Village, an organization in East Sussex, England
- BF International Village, a barangay in Metro Manila, Philippines
