= Berlin Radio Tower =

Former broadcasting tower in Berlin

Coordinates: 52°30′18.2″N 13°16′41.45″E

Funkturm Berlin
- Berliner Funkturm
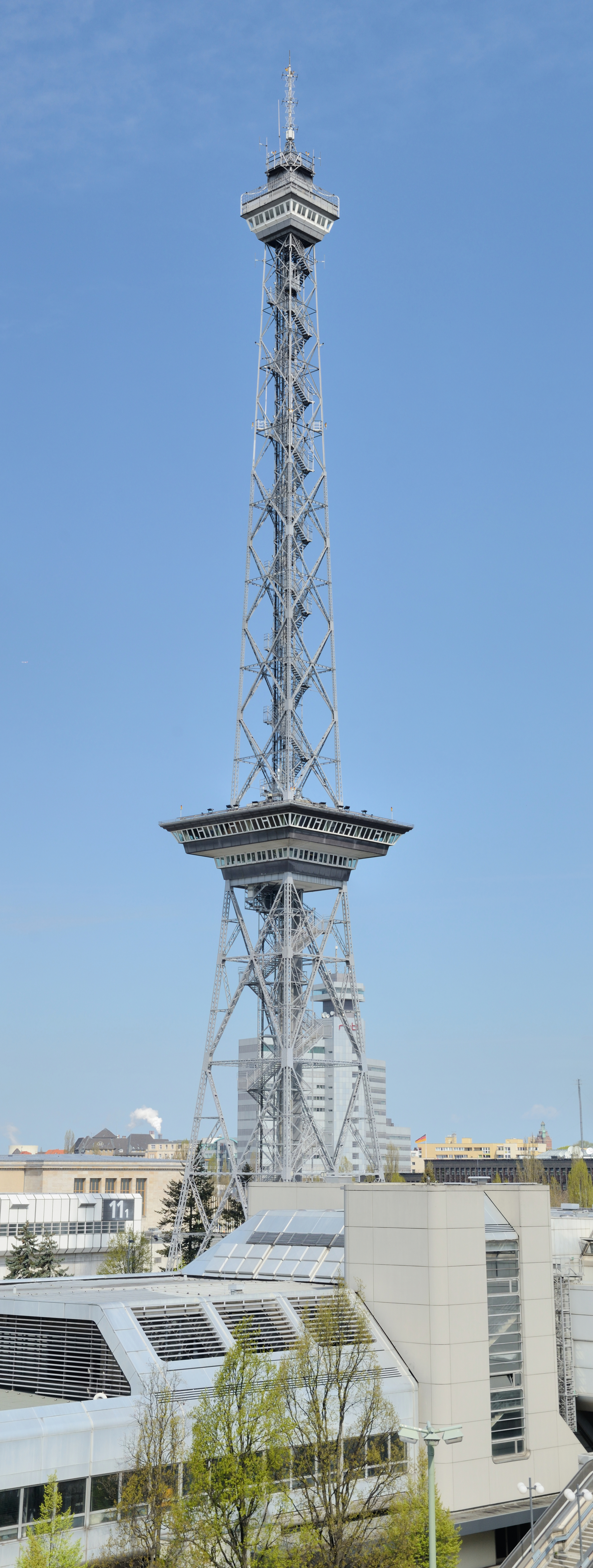
- Funkturm Berlin
- Interactive map of the Funkturm Berlin area

General information
- Status: Completed
- Type: Radio tower Lattice tower Observation tower Telecommunications
- Location: Charlottenburg-Wilmersforf, Berlin, Germany
- Elevation: 55m
- Groundbreaking: 1924
- Completed: 1926
- Opened: September 3, 1926
- Inaugurated: 3 September 1926
- Cost: 203,660 German Marks

Height
- Height: 146.78
- Architectural: Heinrich Straumer
- Tip: tip
- Observatory: 124.09

Technical details
- Structural system: Steel structure

Design and construction
- Architect: Heinrich Straumer

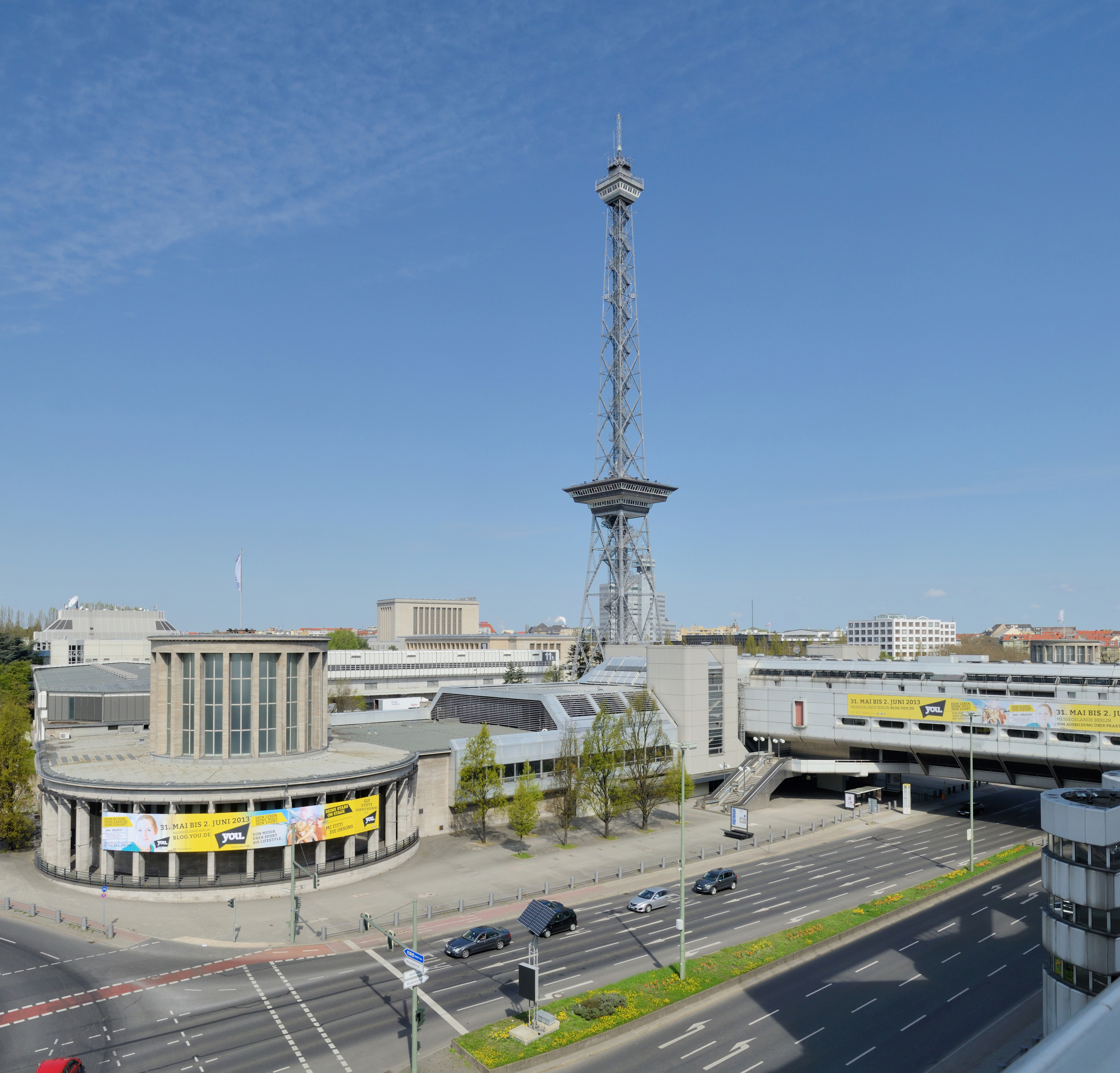
The Funkturm Berlin

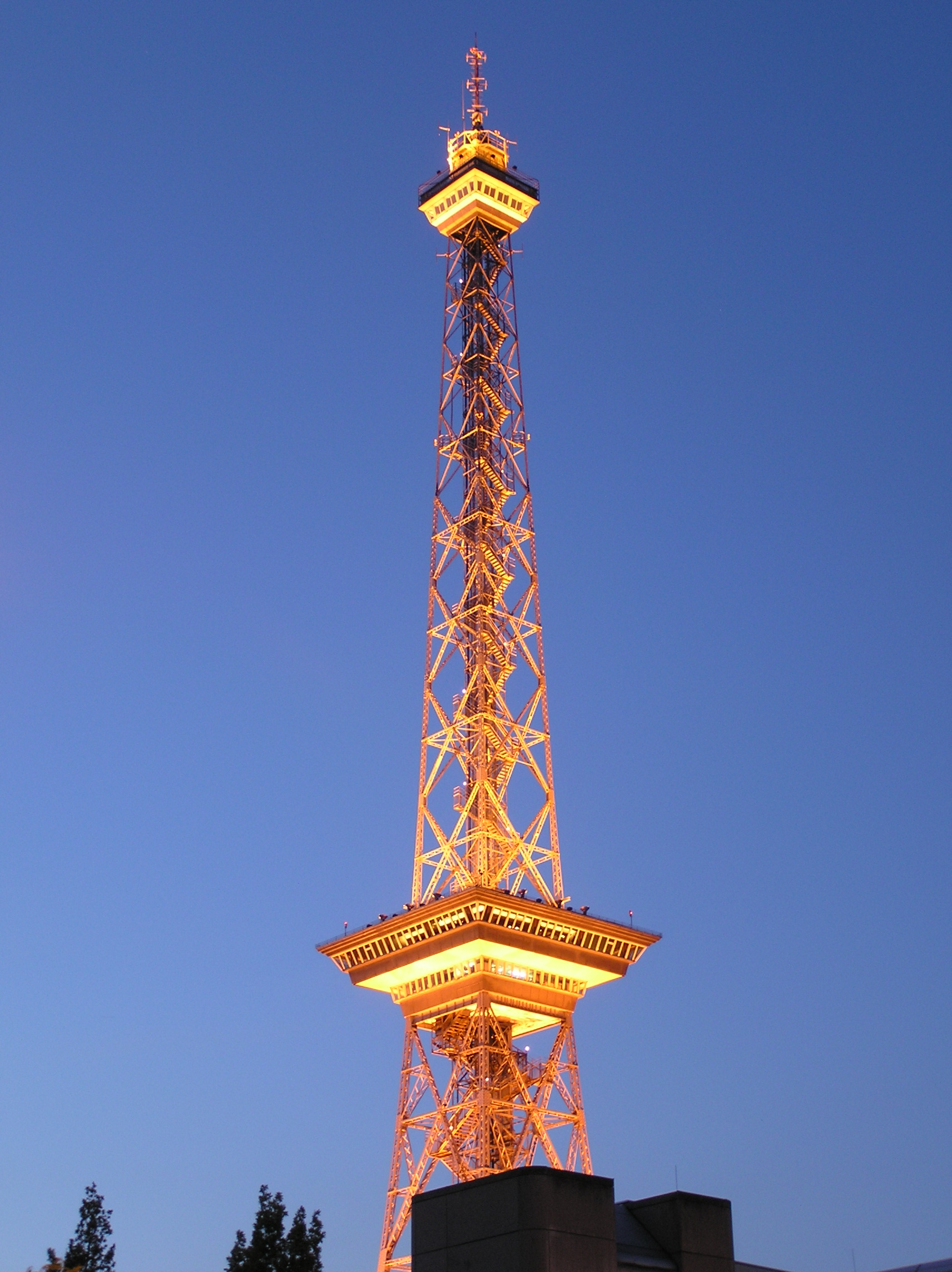
The Funkturm Berlin in the evening

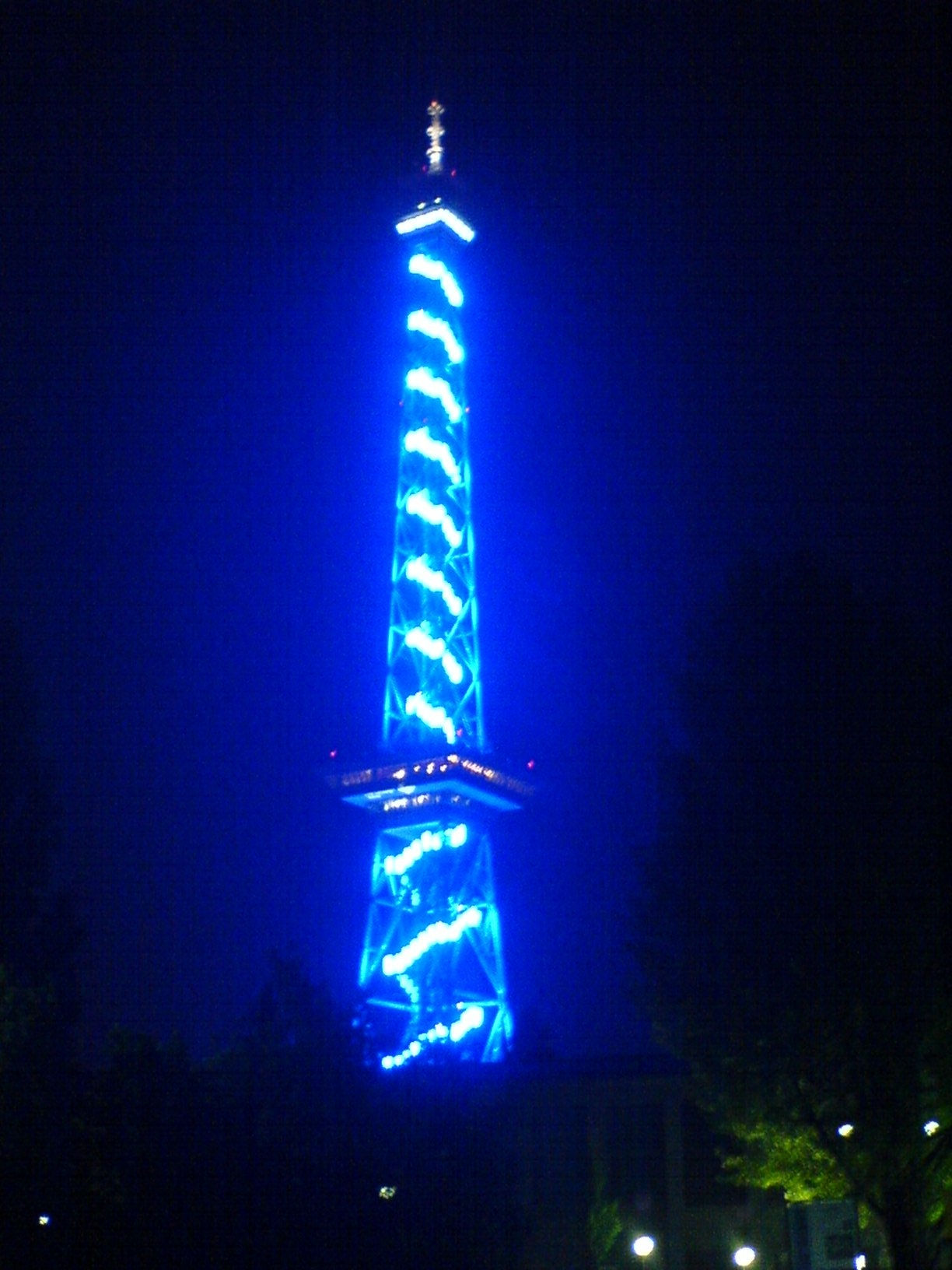
Funkturm – blue illuminated on the occasion of the Funkausstellung 2005

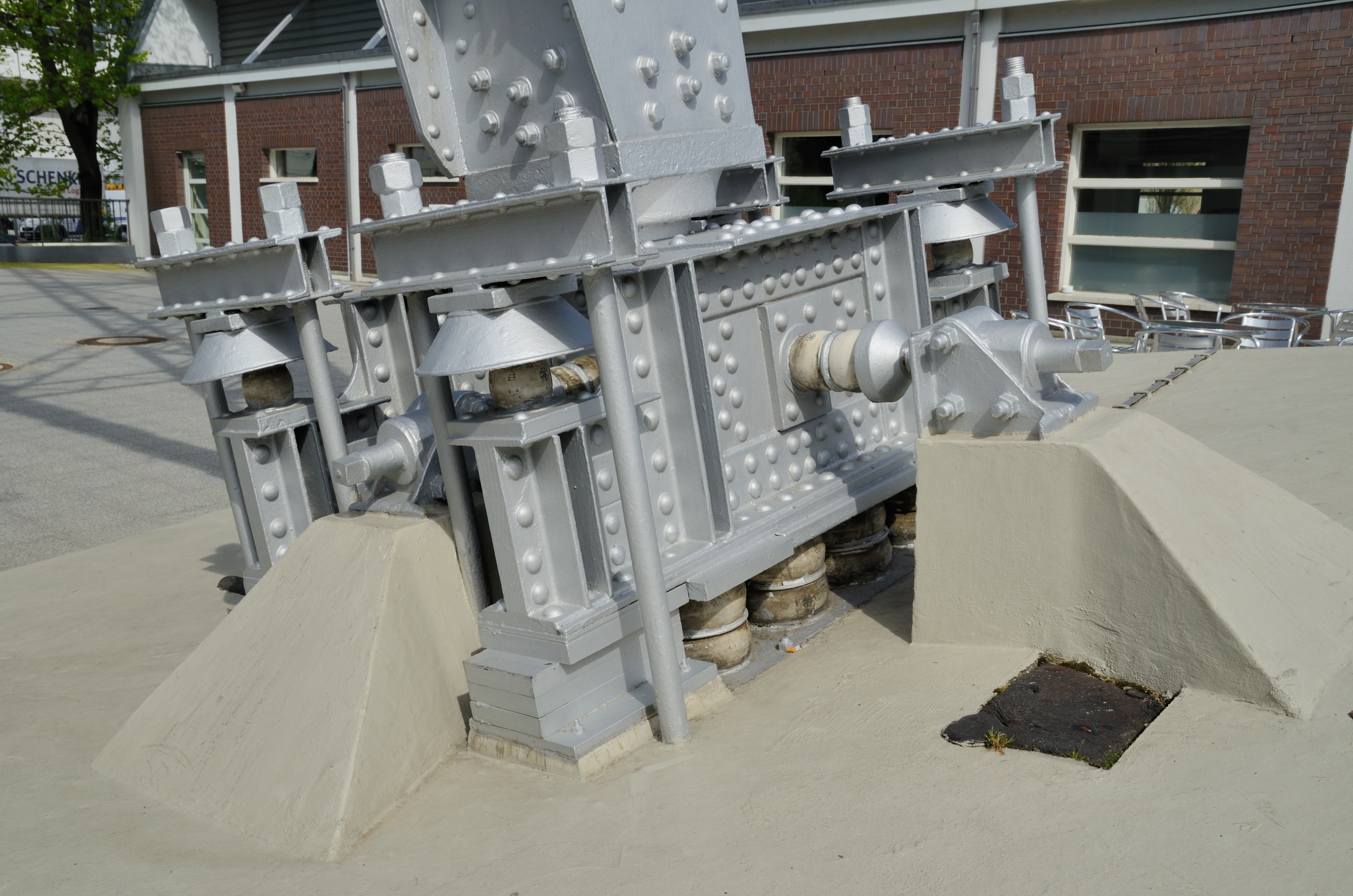
Base of the tower

The Berliner Funkturm or Funkturm Berlin (Berlin Radio Tower) is a former broadcasting tower in Berlin, Germany. Constructed between 1924 and 1926 to designs by the architect Heinrich Straumer, it was inaugurated on 3 September 1926, on the occasion of the opening of the third Große Deutsche Funkausstellung (Great German Radio Exhibition) in the grounds of the Messe Berlin trade fair in the borough of Charlottenburg-Wilmersdorf. Nicknamed der lange Lulatsch ("the lanky lad"), the tower is one of the best-known points of interest in the city of Berlin and, while no longer used for broadcasting purposes, it remains a protected monument.

== Construction method ==
The tower is built as one large steel framework construction, similar to the Eiffel Tower in Paris. The 150-metre-high (490 ft) and approximately 600-metric ton radio tower was originally planned strictly as a transmitting tower, but later additions included a restaurant at a height of approximately 52 m, and observation deck at a height of approximately 125 m. Visitors reach the restaurant and the observation deck by an elevator which travels up to 6 meters per second.

The radio tower has two very notable structural characteristics. First, it sits on a square surface area merely 20 square meters. Its ratio of surface area to height is 1:6.9. For comparison, the Eiffel Tower sits on a square 129 square meters, giving surface-area-to-height ratio of 1:2.3. Second, the radio tower is probably the only observation tower in the world standing on porcelain insulators. It was designed as the support tower for a T-antenna for medium wave, and the insulators were intended to prevent the drain of the transmitting power down through the tower itself. However, this was impractical, because visitors would have been vulnerable to massive electric shocks, so the tower was later grounded via its elevator shaft. The insulators used were manufactured in the Koeniglich Preussische Porzellanmanufaktur (Royal Prussian Porcelain Factory).

On March 22, 1935, the first regular television program in the world was broadcast from an aerial on the top of the tower. In 1962, the tower stopped being used for West German television transmissions. In 1973, the radio tower stopped serving as a regular transmission tower for broadcasting purposes, but it is still used as relay station for police radio, and mobile phone services. The last complete renovation took place in 1987 in honor of the 750th anniversary of the founding of Berlin.

== Dimensions ==
- Heights
- height of kitchen: 48 m
- height of restaurant: 51 m
- height of observation pulpit: 121 m
- height of observation platform: 124 m
- height of tower shaft: 129 m
- height of tower: 150 m
- Cross sections of the tower
- spreading of the footings directly above the foundations: 18.5 m
- distance of the foundation edges at the ground: 24.5 m
- cross section in the kitchen: 9.1 m
- cross section at base of restaurant: 15 m
- cross section of the restaurant roof: 18.7 m
- cross section of observation pulpit: 4.4 m
- cross section of observation platform: 7.9 m
- Other cross sections
- cross section of the basement plates at the ground: 5.7 m
- cross sections lift well
  - underneath restaurant: 4.05 m
  - above restaurant: 2.4 m
- Weight: 600 metric tons

== Chronicle of the Berliner Funkturm ==
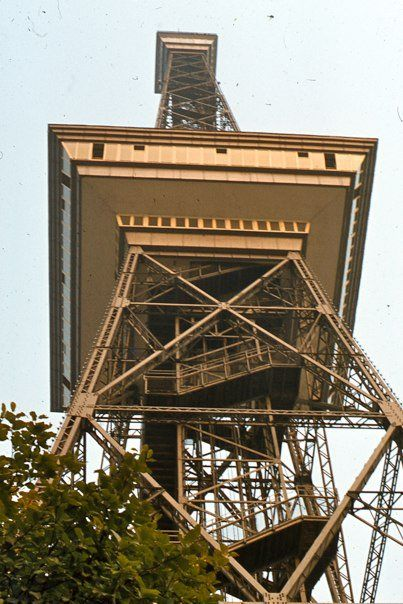
The tower in 1977

- December 1924: After the end of the First Radio Exhibition, construction of the radio tower was started. For this fair, at the location of the today's radio tower, a 120 meters tall antenna mast was erected, which served as crane for building the tower.
- April 1925: The radio tower is finished in the infrastructure.
- September 25, 1925: Inauguration of the transmitter on medium wave frequency 520.8 kHz. A single T-antenna was strung between the top of the tower and an 80-meter-high guyed steel framework mast.
- 1925–26: To protect visitors from electrical hazards, the radio tower was grounded about its elevator shaft, although this directed the beam of the radio transmitter away from the center of Berlin.
- March 28, 1926: Acceptance of the radio tower by the construction offices.
- September 3, 1926: Radio tower opened to the public at the inauguration of the Third Great German Radio Exhibition (Funkausstellung).
- 1929: Retuning of the medium wave transmitter to 716 kHz, first television transmission tests.
- December 20, 1933: The new large transmitter in Berlin Tegel takes over the broadcast transmissions from the radio tower. After this, the medium wave transmitter at the radio tower is only a backup transmitter for Berlin Tegel.
- 1934: Retuning of the medium wave transmitter (as a backup unit for Berlin Tegel), to 834 kHz
- March 22, 1935: From an antenna of the top of the radio tower, the first regular television program of the world is transmitted
- August 22, 1935: Major fire in the exhibition hall at the radio tower destroys all transmission devices at the radio tower. Flying sparks also burn out the tower restaurant.
- December 23, 1935: Resumption of television broadcasts.
- 1938: Television transmitting equipment removed from the tower.
- 1939–1945: The radio tower serves as a warning and observation post.
- April 19, 1945: Projectiles destroy one of the four legs of the tower at a height of 38 meters. The restaurant is again burned out.
- 1945: Repair of the destroyed tower leg with 800 kg screws and 7.2 tons steel.
- 1948: Experiments with directed radio transmission toward the mountain of Harz.
- May 28, 1950: The tower restaurant reopens.
- 1951: Assembly of one superturnstile antenna on the top of the tower for the broadcast of FM radio and television programs. With this antenna, the tower grew around 12 meters, from 138 meters to 150 meters.
- October 1, 1951: Resumption of the television transmissions which were disrupted by World War II and the immediate post-war period.
- May 15, 1963: After completion of the 230-meter-high transmission mast near Scholzplatz, regular transmissions of television and broadcast programs from the tower were almost terminated.
- 1973: End of any regular broadcast transmission from the radio tower.
- 1989: Disassembly of the tower's last transmitters for broadcast of radio and television.

== See also ==
- Eiffel Tower replicas and derivatives
- Berliner Fernsehturm
