= Saint-Aubin-des-Ormeaux =

- Commune
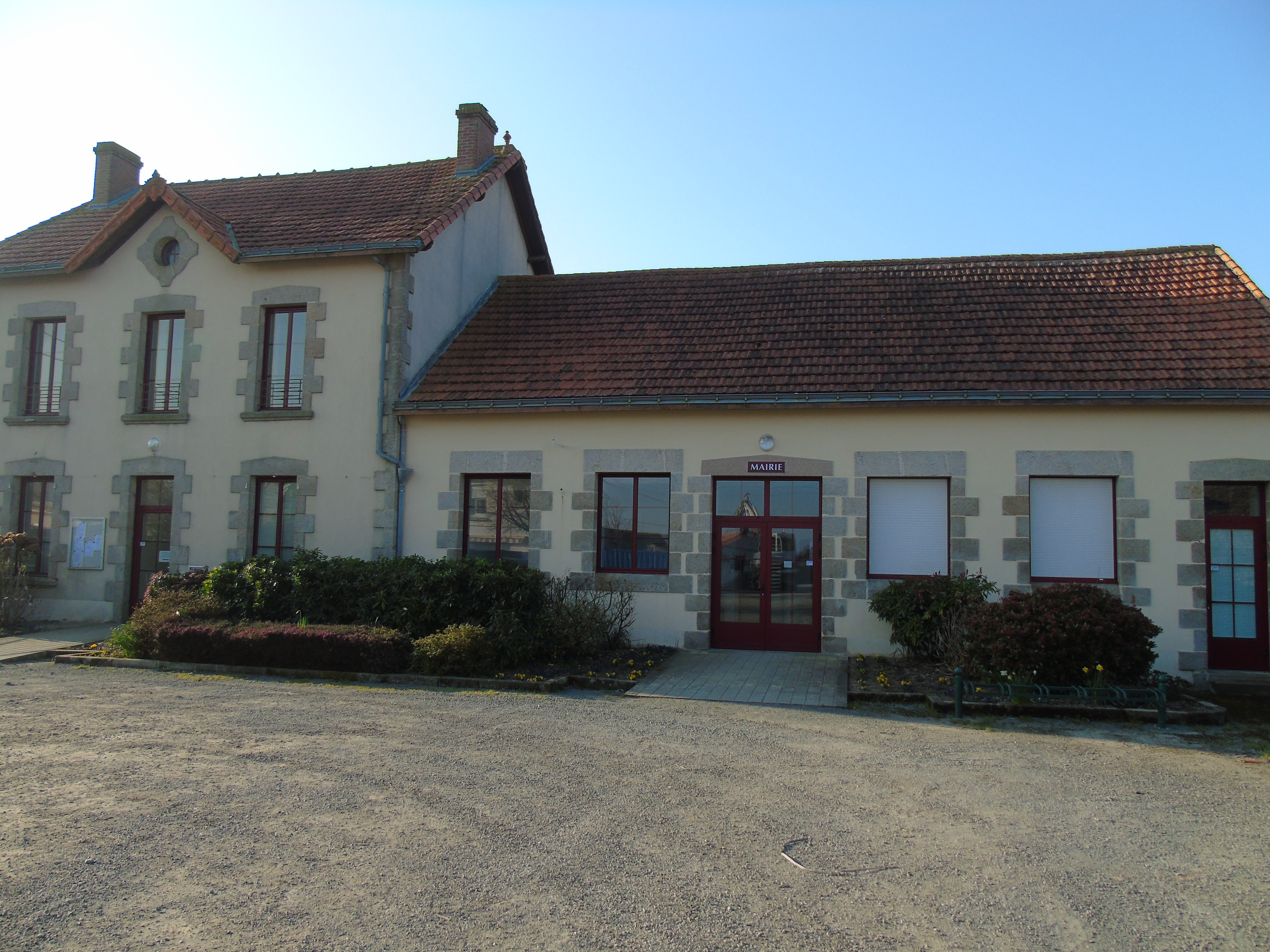
- Town hall

- Coat of arms
- Location of Saint-Aubin-des-Ormeaux
- Location within France Location within Pays de la Loire
- Coordinates: 46°59′32″N 1°02′32″W
- Country: France
- Region: Pays de la Loire
- Department: Vendée
- Arrondissement: La Roche-sur-Yon
- Canton: Mortagne-sur-Sèvre
- Intercommunality: Pays de Mortagne

Government
  - Mayor (2020–2026): Hervé Bréjon
- Area^{1}: 12.63 km^{2} (4.88 sq mi)
- Highest elevation: 141 m (463 ft)
- Lowest elevation: 52 m (171 ft)
- Population (2023): 1,394
  - Density: 110.4/km^{2} (285.9/sq mi)
- Time zone: UTC+01:00 (CET)
  - Summer (DST): UTC+02:00 (CEST)
- INSEE/Postal code: 85198 /85130
- ^{1} French Land Register data, which excludes lakes, ponds, glaciers > 1 km^{2} (0.386 sq mi or 247 acres) and river estuaries.

Saint-Aubin-des-Ormeaux (French pronunciation: [sɛ̃.t‿obɛ̃ de.z‿ɔʁmo]) is a commune in the Vendée department in the Pays de la Loire region in western France.

== See also ==
- Communes of the Vendée department
