= Les Landes-Genusson =

- Commune
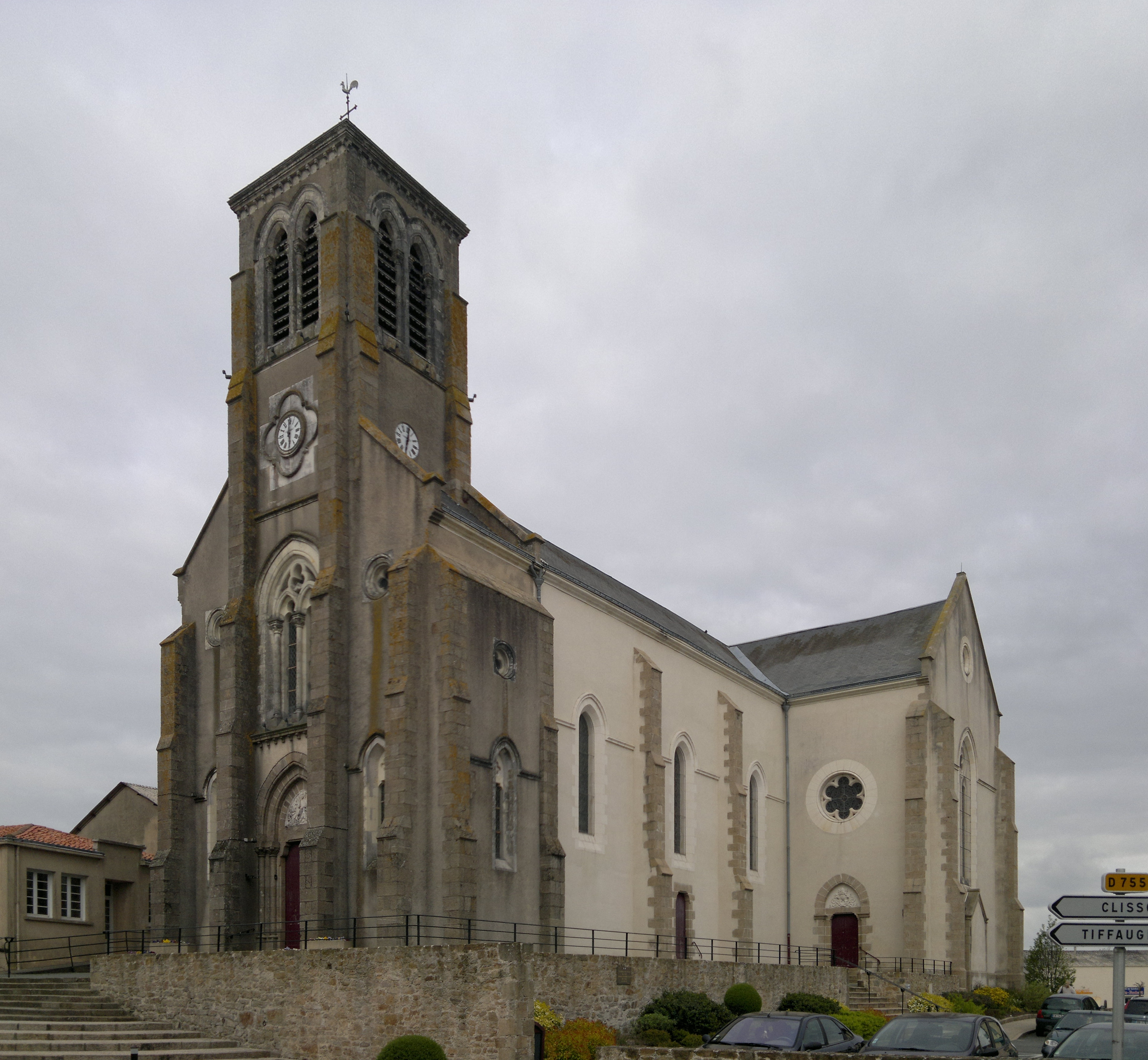
- The church of Our Lady of the Assumption, in Les Landes-Genusson

- Coat of arms
- Location of Les Landes-Genusson
- Location within France Location within Pays de la Loire
- Coordinates: 46°57′59″N 1°07′02″W
- Country: France
- Region: Pays de la Loire
- Department: Vendée
- Arrondissement: La Roche-sur-Yon
- Canton: Mortagne-sur-Sèvre
- Intercommunality: Pays de Mortagne

Government
  - Mayor (2020–2026): Guy Girard
- Area^{1}: 31.33 km^{2} (12.10 sq mi)
- Highest elevation: 121 m (397 ft)
- Lowest elevation: 53 m (174 ft)
- Population (2023): 2,638
  - Density: 84.20/km^{2} (218.1/sq mi)
- Time zone: UTC+01:00 (CET)
  - Summer (DST): UTC+02:00 (CEST)
- INSEE/Postal code: 85119 /85130
- ^{1} French Land Register data, which excludes lakes, ponds, glaciers > 1 km^{2} (0.386 sq mi or 247 acres) and river estuaries.

Les Landes-Genusson (French pronunciation: [le lɑ̃d ʒənysɔ̃]) is a commune in the Vendée department in the Pays de la Loire region in western France.

== Geography ==
=== Climate ===
Les Landes-Genusson has an oceanic climate (Köppen climate classification Cfb). The average annual temperature in Les Landes-Genusson is 12.2 °C (54.0 °F). The average annual rainfall is 906.4 mm (35.69 in) with November as the wettest month. The temperatures are highest on average in August, at around 19.6 °C (67.3 °F), and lowest in January, at around 5.7 °C (42.3 °F). The highest temperature ever recorded in Les Landes-Genusson was 40.1 °C (104.2 °F) on 5 August 2003; the coldest temperature ever recorded was −11.8 °C (10.8 °F) on 1 March 2005.

Climate data for Les Landes-Genusson (1981−2010 normals, extremes 1992−2017)
| Month | Jan | Feb | Mar | Apr | May | Jun | Jul | Aug | Sep | Oct | Nov | Dec | Year |
|---|---|---|---|---|---|---|---|---|---|---|---|---|---|
| Record high °C (°F) | 17.3 (63.1) | 21.2 (70.2) | 25.0 (77.0) | 29.0 (84.2) | 33.2 (91.8) | 36.9 (98.4) | 38.7 (101.7) | 40.1 (104.2) | 34.7 (94.5) | 30.9 (87.6) | 22.8 (73.0) | 17.4 (63.3) | 40.1 (104.2) |
| Mean daily maximum °C (°F) | 8.7 (47.7) | 10.2 (50.4) | 13.2 (55.8) | 15.9 (60.6) | 19.8 (67.6) | 23.8 (74.8) | 25.5 (77.9) | 25.7 (78.3) | 22.3 (72.1) | 17.4 (63.3) | 11.9 (53.4) | 8.6 (47.5) | 17.0 (62.6) |
| Daily mean °C (°F) | 5.7 (42.3) | 6.3 (43.3) | 8.5 (47.3) | 10.6 (51.1) | 14.5 (58.1) | 17.8 (64.0) | 19.5 (67.1) | 19.6 (67.3) | 16.5 (61.7) | 13.2 (55.8) | 8.6 (47.5) | 5.7 (42.3) | 12.2 (54.0) |
| Mean daily minimum °C (°F) | 2.8 (37.0) | 2.4 (36.3) | 3.7 (38.7) | 5.4 (41.7) | 9.2 (48.6) | 11.9 (53.4) | 13.5 (56.3) | 13.5 (56.3) | 10.8 (51.4) | 9.1 (48.4) | 5.3 (41.5) | 2.7 (36.9) | 7.6 (45.7) |
| Record low °C (°F) | −11.0 (12.2) | −10.5 (13.1) | −11.8 (10.8) | −6.4 (20.5) | −1.0 (30.2) | 3.0 (37.4) | 6.6 (43.9) | 5.5 (41.9) | 2.1 (35.8) | −4.8 (23.4) | −8.3 (17.1) | −10.0 (14.0) | −11.8 (10.8) |
| Average precipitation mm (inches) | 95.8 (3.77) | 73.0 (2.87) | 61.7 (2.43) | 70.9 (2.79) | 68.0 (2.68) | 41.1 (1.62) | 52.1 (2.05) | 62.9 (2.48) | 71.5 (2.81) | 103.3 (4.07) | 103.4 (4.07) | 102.7 (4.04) | 906.4 (35.69) |
| Average precipitation days (≥ 1.0 mm) | 13.0 | 10.6 | 10.3 | 11.2 | 10.2 | 6.6 | 7.5 | 8.3 | 9.4 | 12.3 | 14.2 | 13.6 | 127.2 |
Source: Météo-France

== Population ==
Historical population
| Year | Pop. | ±% p.a. |
|---|---|---|
| 1968 | 1,632 | — |
| 1975 | 1,792 | +1.35% |
| 1982 | 1,941 | +1.15% |
| 1990 | 2,004 | +0.40% |
| 1999 | 1,986 | −0.10% |
| 2007 | 2,265 | +1.66% |
| 2012 | 2,269 | +0.04% |
| 2017 | 2,387 | +1.02% |
| 2023 | 2,638 | +1.68% |
Source: INSEE

== See also ==
- Communes of the Vendée department
