= Chambretaud =

- Part of Chanverrie
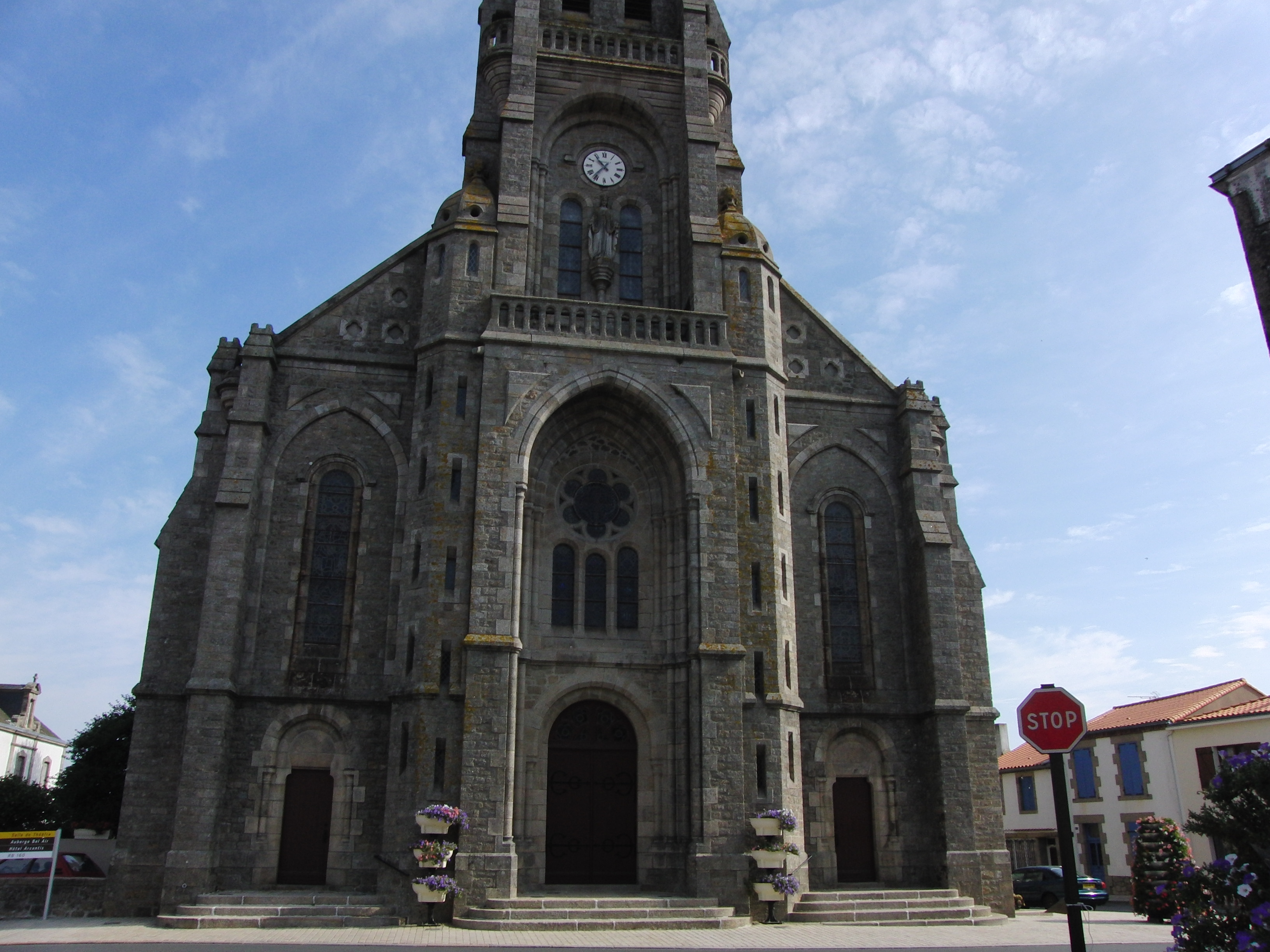
- The church in Chambretaud
- Location of Chambretaud
- Location within France Location within Pays de la Loire
- Coordinates: 46°55′21″N 0°57′49″W
- Country: France
- Region: Pays de la Loire
- Department: Vendée
- Arrondissement: La Roche-sur-Yon
- Canton: Mortagne-sur-Sèvre
- Commune: Chanverrie
- Area^{1}: 16.10 km^{2} (6.22 sq mi)
- Highest elevation: 248 m (814 ft)
- Lowest elevation: 148 m (486 ft)
- Population (2022): 1,564
  - Density: 97.14/km^{2} (251.6/sq mi)
- Time zone: UTC+01:00 (CET)
  - Summer (DST): UTC+02:00 (CEST)
- Postal code: 85500
- ^{1} French Land Register data, which excludes lakes, ponds, glaciers > 1 km^{2} (0.386 sq mi or 247 acres) and river estuaries.

Chambretaud (French pronunciation: [ʃɑ̃bʁəto]) is a former commune in the Vendée department in the Pays de la Loire region in western France. On 1 January 2019, it was merged into the new commune Chanverrie.

== See also ==
- Communes of the Vendée department
