= Mortagne-sur-Sèvre =

- Commune
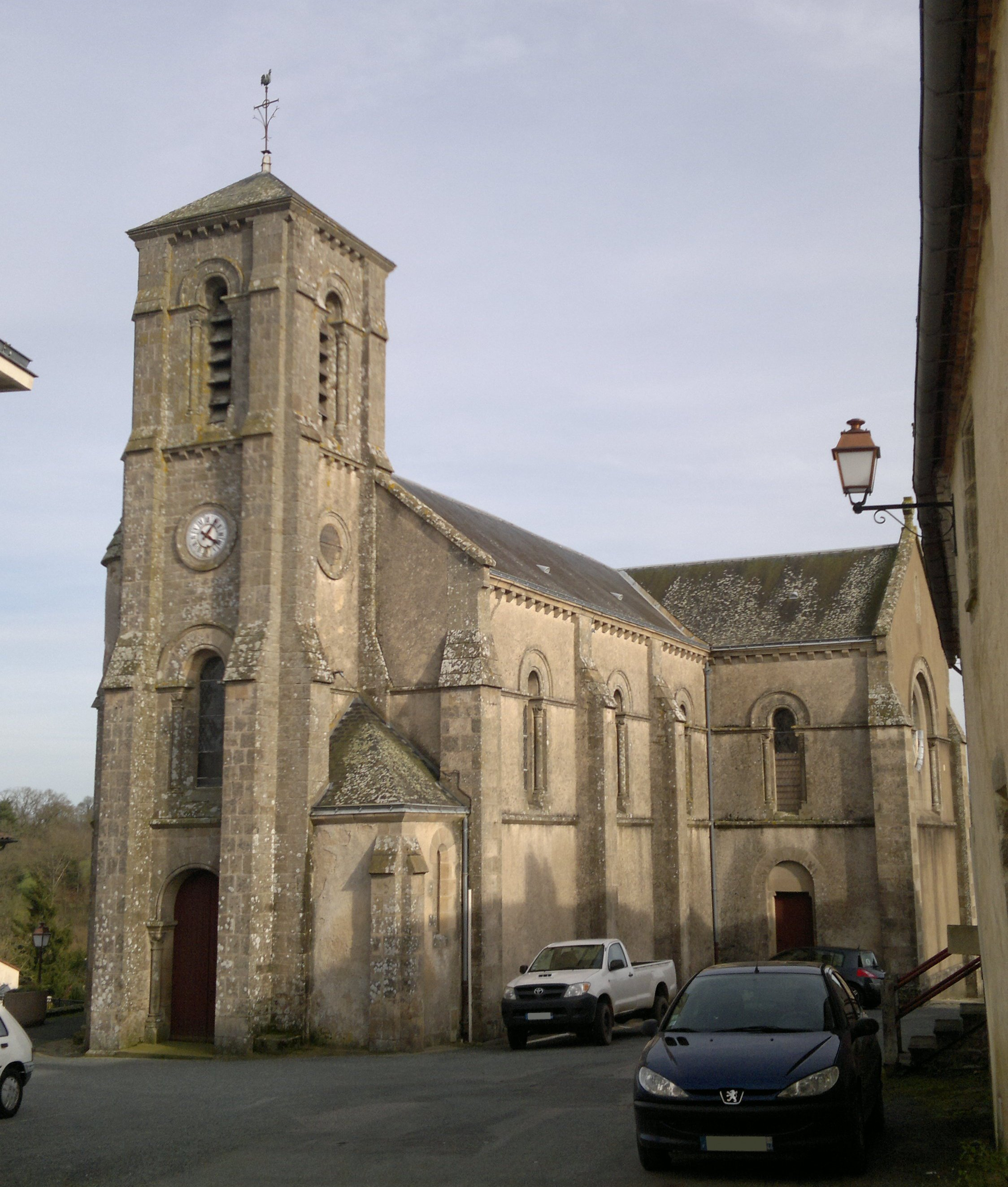
- The church in the village of Evrunes, in Mortagne-sur-Sèvre

- Coat of arms
- Location of Mortagne-sur-Sèvre
- Location within France Location within Pays de la Loire
- Coordinates: 46°59′33″N 0°57′09″W
- Country: France
- Region: Pays de la Loire
- Department: Vendée
- Arrondissement: La Roche-sur-Yon
- Canton: Mortagne-sur-Sèvre
- Intercommunality: Pays de Mortagne

Government
  - Mayor (2020–2026): Alain Brochoire
- Area^{1}: 21.94 km^{2} (8.47 sq mi)
- Highest elevation: 151 m (495 ft)
- Lowest elevation: 57 m (187 ft)
- Population (2023): 6,057
  - Density: 276.1/km^{2} (715.0/sq mi)
- Time zone: UTC+01:00 (CET)
  - Summer (DST): UTC+02:00 (CEST)
- INSEE/Postal code: 85151 /85290
- ^{1} French Land Register data, which excludes lakes, ponds, glaciers > 1 km^{2} (0.386 sq mi or 247 acres) and river estuaries.

Mortagne-sur-Sèvre (French pronunciation: [mɔʁtaɲ syʁ sɛvʁ], literally Mortagne on Sèvre) is a commune in the Vendée department in the Pays de la Loire region in western France. The commune was formed by the consolidation Mortagne-sur-Sèvre, Évrunes and Saint-Hilaire-de-Mortagne in 1964.

== Population ==
Historical population
Year	Pop.	±% p.a.
1968	4,246	—
1975	4,691	+1.43%
1982	5,301	+1.76%
1990	5,724	+0.96%
1999	5,938	+0.41%
2007	6,080	+0.30%
2012	5,992	−0.29%
2017	5,930	−0.21%
2023	6,057	+0.35%
Source: INSEE

== See also ==
- Communes of the Vendée department
