= Saint-Martin-des-Tilleuls =

- Commune
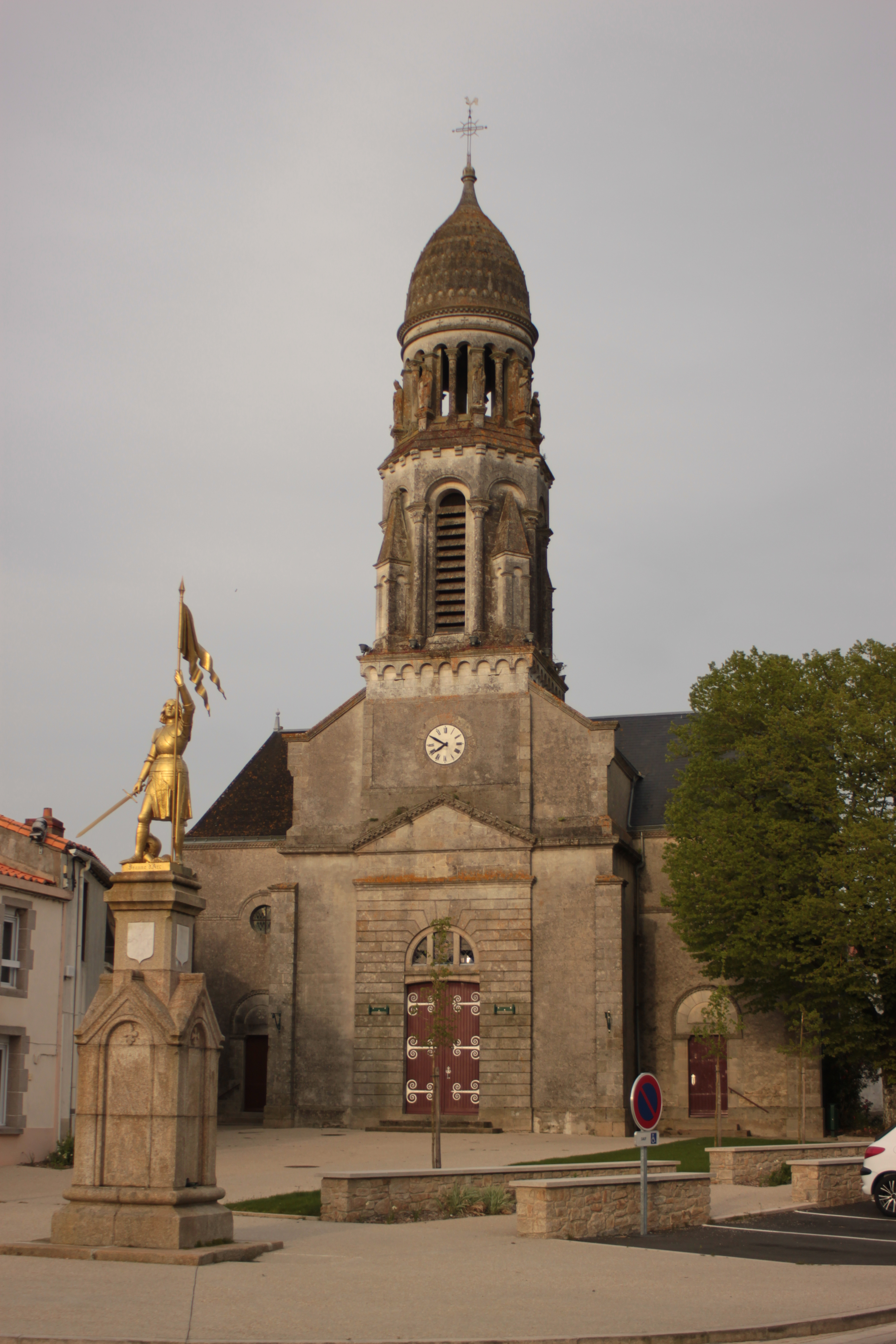
- The church in Saint-Martin-des-Tilleuls

- Coat of arms
- Location of Saint-Martin-des-Tilleuls
- Location within France Location within Pays de la Loire
- Coordinates: 46°58′29″N 1°03′00″W
- Country: France
- Region: Pays de la Loire
- Department: Vendée
- Arrondissement: La Roche-sur-Yon
- Canton: Mortagne-sur-Sèvre
- Intercommunality: Pays de Mortagne

Government
  - Mayor (2020–2026): Alain Landreau
- Area^{1}: 14.03 km^{2} (5.42 sq mi)
- Highest elevation: 189 m (620 ft)
- Lowest elevation: 60 m (200 ft)
- Population (2023): 1,150
  - Density: 82.0/km^{2} (212/sq mi)
- Time zone: UTC+01:00 (CET)
  - Summer (DST): UTC+02:00 (CEST)
- INSEE/Postal code: 85247 /85130
- ^{1} French Land Register data, which excludes lakes, ponds, glaciers > 1 km^{2} (0.386 sq mi or 247 acres) and river estuaries.

Saint-Martin-des-Tilleuls (French pronunciation: [sɛ̃ maʁtɛ̃ de tijœl]) is a commune in the Vendée department in the Pays de la Loire region in western France.

== See also ==
- Communes of the Vendée department
