= Treize-Vents =

Tréize-Vénts
- Commune
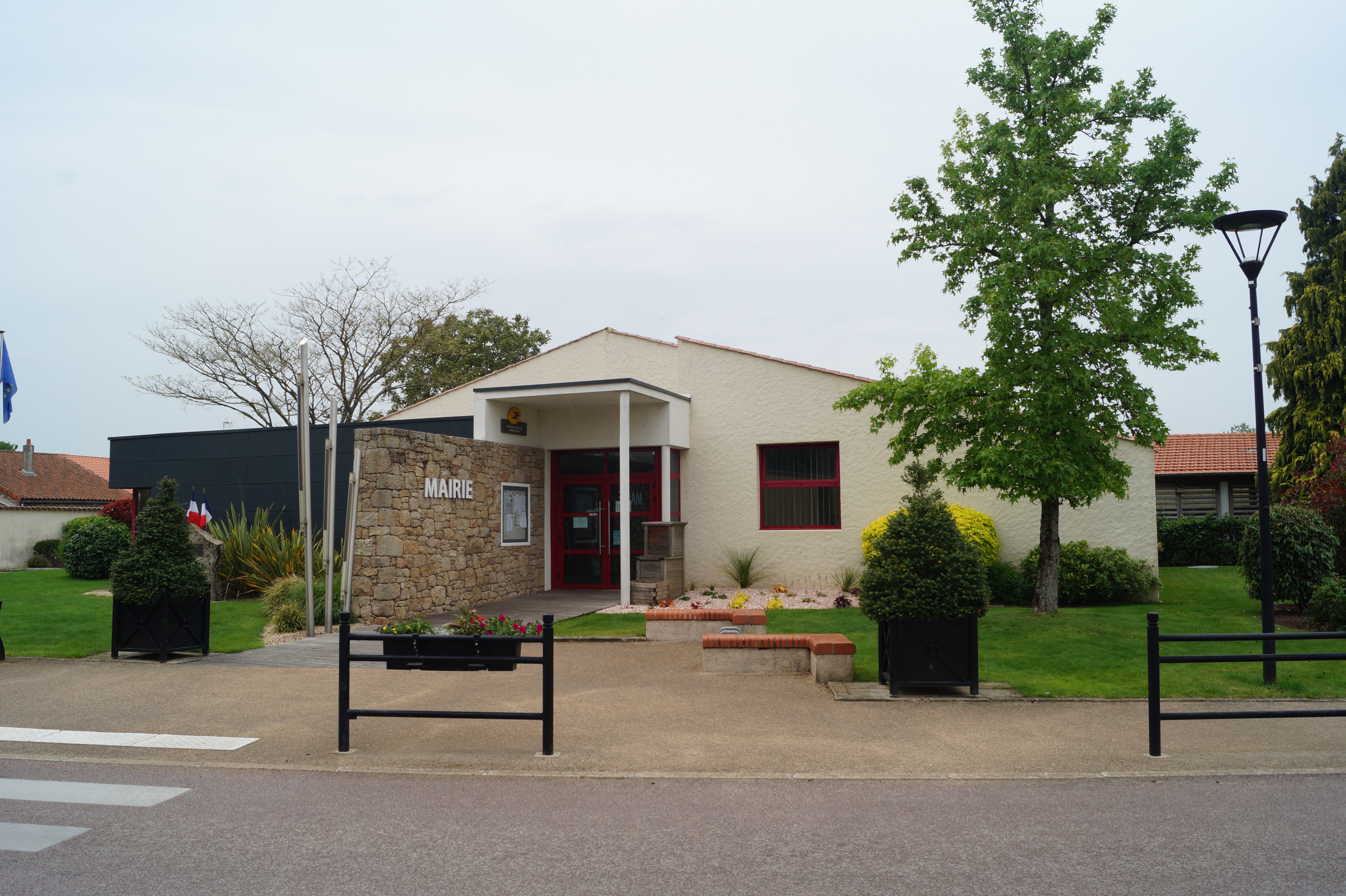
- Town hall of Tréize-Vénts

- Coat of arms
- Location of Tréize-Vénts
- Location within France Location within Pays de la Loire
- Coordinates: 46°55′18″N 0°50′48″W
- Country: France
- Region: Pays de la Loire
- Department: Vendée
- Arrondissement: La Roche-sur-Yon
- Canton: Mortagne-sur-Sèvre
- Intercommunality: Pays de Mortagne

Government
  - Mayor (2020–2026): Nicole Beaufreton
- Area^{1}: 19.12 km^{2} (7.38 sq mi)
- Highest elevation: 215 m (705 ft)
- Lowest elevation: 113 m (371 ft)
- Population (2023): 1,226
  - Density: 64.12/km^{2} (166.1/sq mi)
- Time zone: UTC+01:00 (CET)
  - Summer (DST): UTC+02:00 (CEST)
- INSEE/Postal code: 85296 /85590
- ^{1} French Land Register data, which excludes lakes, ponds, glaciers > 1 km^{2} (0.386 sq mi or 247 acres) and river estuaries.

Tréize-Vénts (French pronunciation: [tʁɛz vɑ̃]) is a commune in the Vendée department in the Pays de la Loire region in western France.

== See also ==
- Communes of the Vendée department
