= Mallièvre =

- Commune
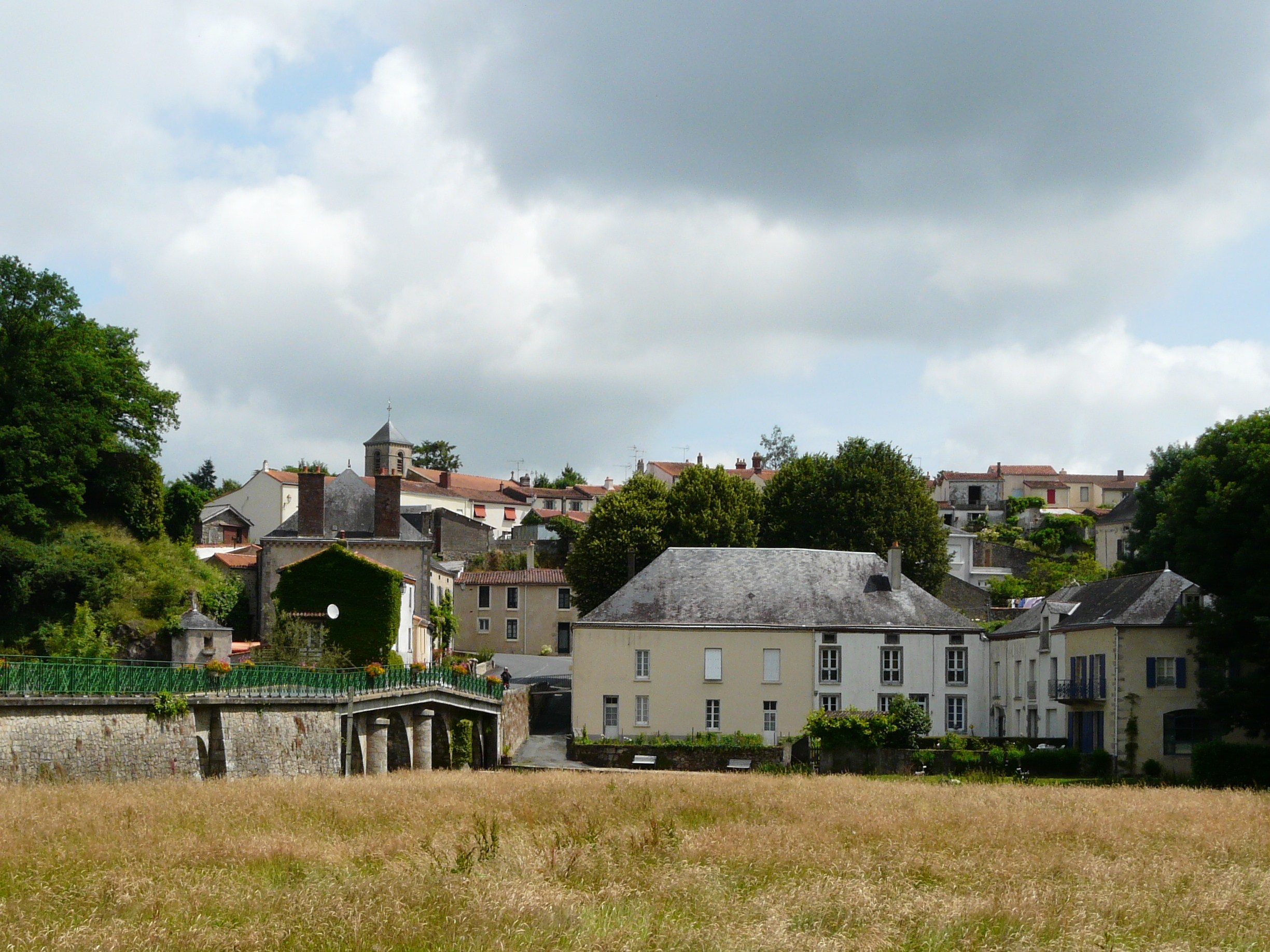
- A general view of Mallièvre

- Coat of arms
- Location of Mallièvre
- Location within France Location within Pays de la Loire
- Coordinates: 46°54′40″N 0°51′43″W
- Country: France
- Region: Pays de la Loire
- Department: Vendée
- Arrondissement: La Roche-sur-Yon
- Canton: Mortagne-sur-Sèvre
- Intercommunality: Pays-de-Mortagne

Government
  - Mayor (2020–2026): Guillaume Jean
- Area^{1}: 0.20 km^{2} (0.077 sq mi)
- Elevation: 100 m (330 ft)
- Highest elevation: 160 m (520 ft)
- Lowest elevation: 122 m (400 ft)
- Population (2023): 251
  - Density: 1,300/km^{2} (3,300/sq mi)
- Time zone: UTC+01:00 (CET)
  - Summer (DST): UTC+02:00 (CEST)
- INSEE/Postal code: 85134 /85590
- ^{1} French Land Register data, which excludes lakes, ponds, glaciers > 1 km^{2} (0.386 sq mi or 247 acres) and river estuaries.

Mallièvre (French pronunciation: [maljɛvʁ]) is a commune in the Vendée department in the Pays de la Loire region in western France.

== See also ==
- Communes of the Vendée department
