= Saint-Malô-du-Bois =

- Commune
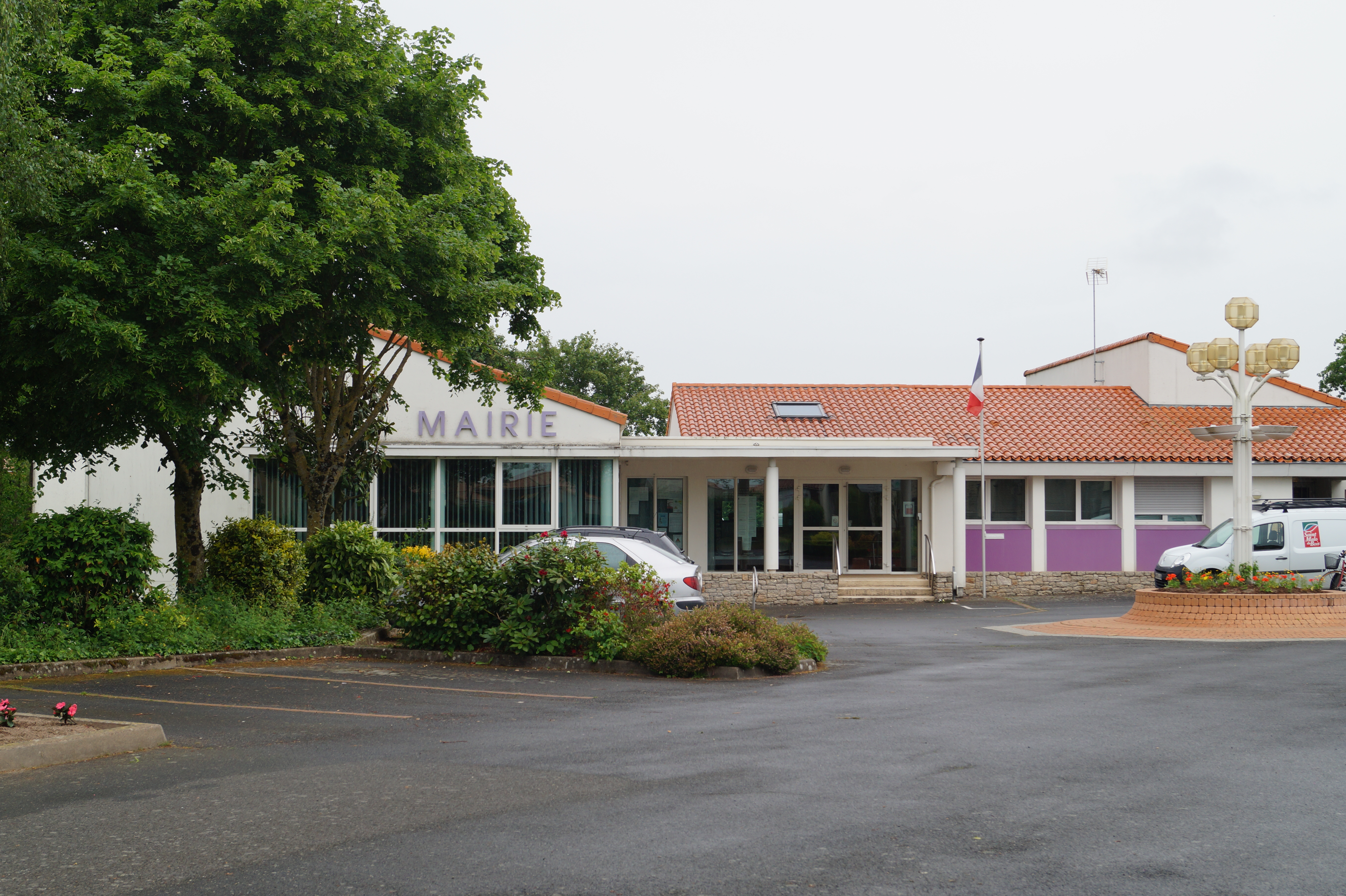
- Town hall of Saint-Malô-du-Bois
- Location of Saint-Malô-du-Bois
- Location within France Location within Pays de la Loire
- Coordinates: 46°55′46″N 0°53′58″W
- Country: France
- Region: Pays de la Loire
- Department: Vendée
- Arrondissement: La Roche-sur-Yon
- Canton: Mortagne-sur-Sèvre
- Intercommunality: Pays de Mortagne

Government
  - Mayor (2020–2026): Arnaud Praile
- Area^{1}: 14.28 km^{2} (5.51 sq mi)
- Highest elevation: 5,221 m (17,129 ft)
- Lowest elevation: 117 m (384 ft)
- Population (2023): 1,612
  - Density: 112.9/km^{2} (292.4/sq mi)
- Time zone: UTC+01:00 (CET)
  - Summer (DST): UTC+02:00 (CEST)
- INSEE/Postal code: 85240 /85590
- ^{1} French Land Register data, which excludes lakes, ponds, glaciers > 1 km^{2} (0.386 sq mi or 247 acres) and river estuaries.

Saint-Malô-du-Bois (French pronunciation: [sɛ̃ malo dy bwa]) is a commune in the Vendée department in the Pays de la Loire region in western France.

== See also ==
- Communes of the Vendée department
