= Chanverrie =

- Commune
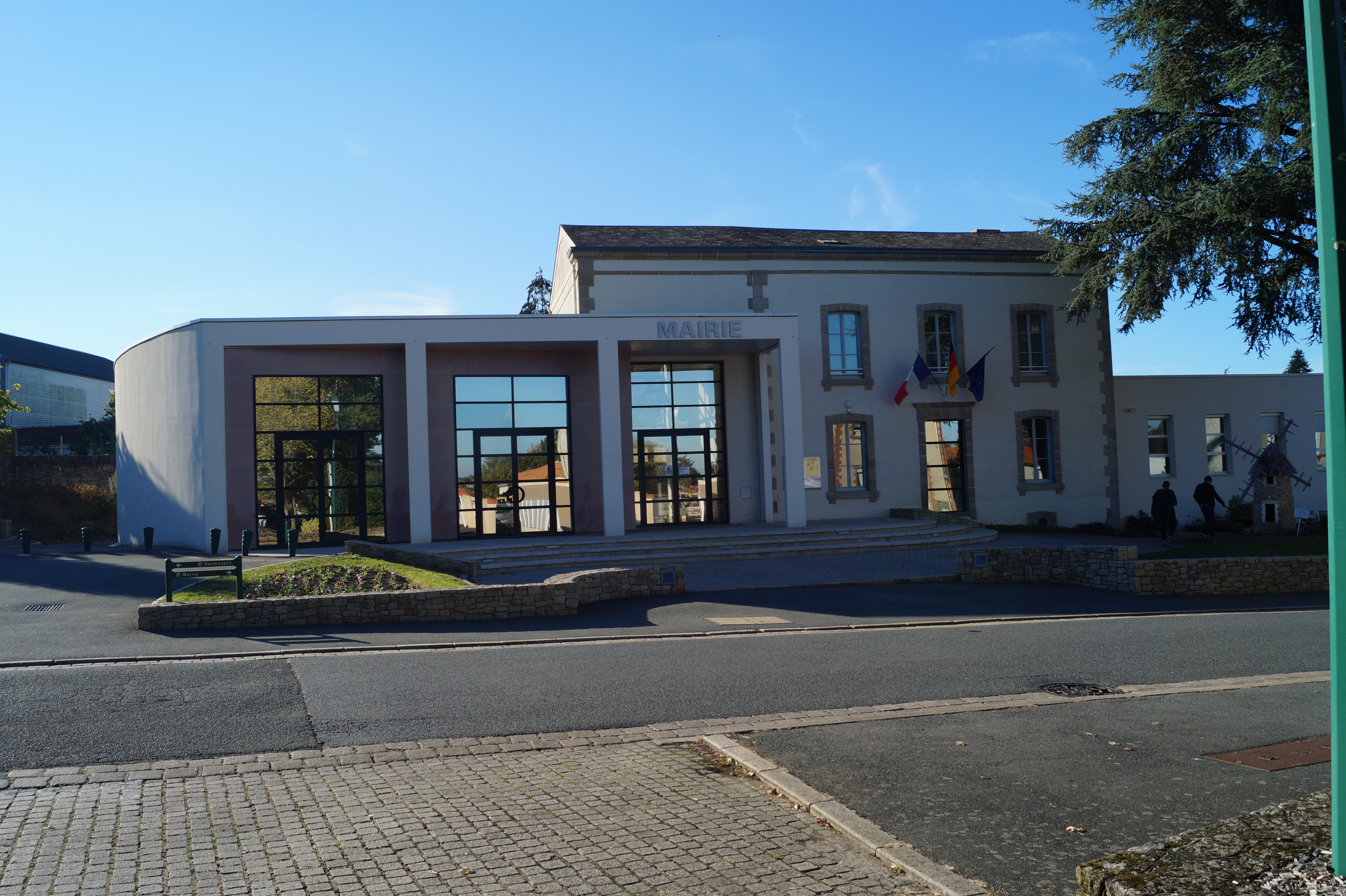
- Location of Chanverrie
- Location within France Location within Pays de la Loire
- Coordinates: 46°57′43″N 0°59′38″W
- Country: France
- Region: Pays de la Loire
- Department: Vendée
- Arrondissement: La Roche-sur-Yon
- Canton: Mortagne-sur-Sèvre
- Intercommunality: Pays de Mortagne

Government
  - Mayor (2020–2026): Jean-François Fruchet
- Area^{1}: 59.41 km^{2} (22.94 sq mi)
- Highest elevation: 245 m (804 ft)
- Lowest elevation: 57 m (187 ft)
- Population (2023): 5,653
  - Density: 95.15/km^{2} (246.4/sq mi)
- Time zone: UTC+01:00 (CET)
  - Summer (DST): UTC+02:00 (CEST)
- INSEE/Postal code: 85302 /85130
- ^{1} French Land Register data, which excludes lakes, ponds, glaciers > 1 km^{2} (0.386 sq mi or 247 acres) and river estuaries.

Chanverrie (French pronunciation: [ʃɑ̃vɛʁi]) is a commune in the Vendée department in the Pays de la Loire region in western France. It was established on 1 January 2019 by merger of the former communes of La Verrie (the seat) and Chambretaud.

== Population ==
Population data refer to the area corresponding with the commune as of January 2025.

Historical population
Year	Pop.	±% p.a.
1968	3,646	—
1975	4,051	+1.52%
1982	4,478	+1.44%
1990	4,807	+0.89%
1999	4,814	+0.02%
2007	5,048	+0.60%
2012	5,307	+1.01%
2017	5,517	+0.78%
2023	5,653	+0.41%
Source: INSEE

== See also ==
- Communes of the Vendée department
