= Berlin-Tegel radio transmitter =

Coordinates: 52°34′20″N 13°17′32″E

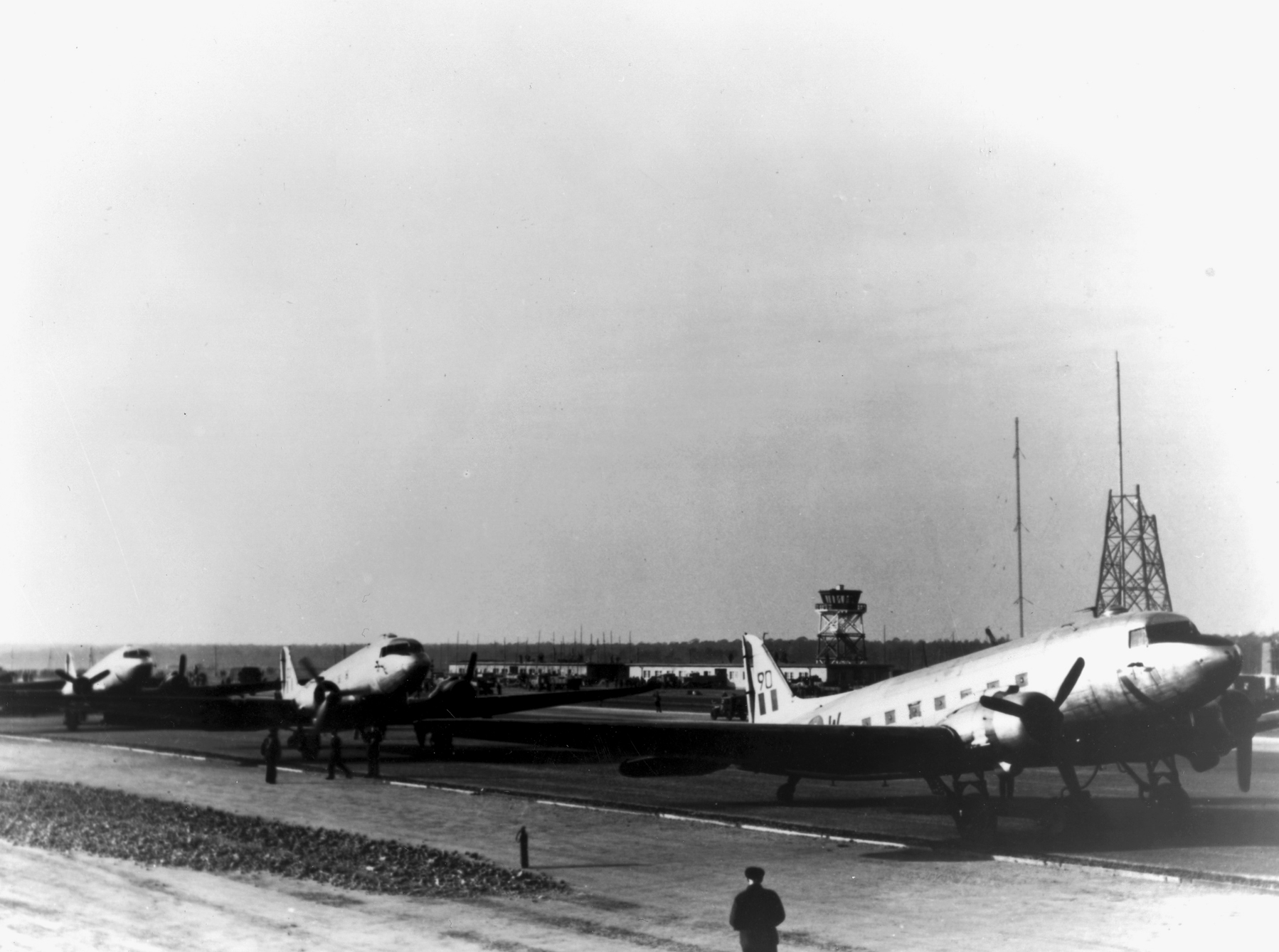
Royal Air Force Douglas C-47 Skytrain Dakota transports being unloaded in the beginning days of flight operations at Berlin Tegel airport. Flight operations at Tegel began on 5 November 1948.

The Transmitter Berlin-Tegel was a broadcasting facility for medium wave in Berlin-Tegel, Germany. It was built in 1933 and used as an aerial wire hung up in a 165-metre-high (541 ft) tower of wood framework. In 1940, the height of the tower was reduced to 86 metres. On December 16, 1948 the tower (and a guyed mast under construction, intended to replace the tower) was bombed under orders of the French Commander (Jean Ganeval) at the time, because of concerns of endangering the air traffic of the nearby Berlin Tegel Airport, which was under construction at the time.

The transmitters were moved to Königs Wusterhausen and installed there. Nevertheless, the transmitter building is still standing.

== See also ==
- List of towers
