= International Village (Gettysburg, Pennsylvania) =

Defunct shopping center in Gettysburg, Pennsylvania

International Village was a small amusement park, shopping, dining and entertainment center located on the south side of Gettysburg, Pennsylvania. It operated from 1970 to 1980. An apartment complex now stands where the park once was.

== History ==
Conceived and built by Richard L. Michael of Timeless Towns of the Americas, International Village was in operation from 1970 to 1980. It was located across the parking lot of the Sheraton Resort Hotel (now the Eisenhower Resort and Convention Center. It had a sky ride and a hippo-themed tractor which transported guests between the hotel and village.

=== Rides ===
The carnival-like rides included a Chance turbo ride and carousel. A classic 1920 wooden carousel originally from Olcott Beach, Olcott, New York, was moved from Boulder Park, Indian Falls, New York, to the park in 1970.

=== Shops ===
The internationally themed shops included Das Gift Haus, Casa Del Oro, The Chinese Chalet, The Old Peddler, Far East Photo World, and Ye Village Toy Vendor. Goods such as imported cigars, collectible plates, oil paintings and international dolls were available. A Korean restaurant which was once located on the property, Korean Cuisine, claimed that they were the first oriental restaurant to open in Gettysburg.

=== Demise ===
A few years after the park opened, business began to slow and many of the rides were closed or sold. The shops remained open a few years longer than the rides, while struggling to compete with other tourist attractions in Gettysburg, including its battlefields.

== Redevelopment efforts ==
The Devenshire apartment complex currently resides on the former site of International Village. In 2010, a proposal was made to build a casino in the area (including the Eisenhower Convention Center). The proposal was rejected by the state in April 2011.
