= Canton of Mortagne-sur-Sèvre =

Canton of France

Coordinates: 46.99°N 0.95°W

The canton of Mortagne-sur-Sèvre is an administrative division of the Vendée department, western France. Its borders were modified at the French canton reorganisation which came into effect in March 2015. Its seat is in Mortagne-sur-Sèvre.

It consists of the following communes:

1. Beaurepaire
2. La Bruffière
3. Chanverrie
4. Cugand-la-Bernardière
5. La Gaubretière
6. Les Landes-Genusson
7. Mallièvre
8. Mortagne-sur-Sèvre
9. Saint-Aubin-des-Ormeaux
10. Saint-Laurent-sur-Sèvre
11. Saint-Malô-du-Bois
12. Saint-Martin-des-Tilleuls
13. Tiffauges
14. Treize-Vents
