= Moutiers =

Moutiers and Les Moutiers may refer to the following places in France :

- Moutiers, Eure-et-Loir, in the Eure-et-Loir department
- Moutiers, Ille-et-Vilaine, in the Ille-et-Vilaine department
- Moutiers, Meurthe-et-Moselle, in the Meurthe-et-Moselle department
- Moûtiers, in the Savoie department
- Moutiers-au-Perche, in the Orne department
- Moutiers-en-Puisaye, in the Yonne department
- Moutiers-les-Mauxfaits, in the Vendée department
- Moutiers-Saint-Jean, in the Côte-d'Or department
- Moutiers-sous-Argenton, in the Deux-Sèvres department
- Moutiers-sous-Chantemerle, in the Deux-Sèvres department
- Moutiers-sur-le-Lay, in the Vendée department
- Moutier-d'Ahun, in the Creuse department
- Moutier-Malcard, in the Creuse department
- Moutier-Rozeille, in the Creuse department
- Les Moutiers-en-Auge, in the Calvados department
- Les Moutiers-en-Cinglais, in the Calvados department
- Les Moutiers-en-Retz, in the Loire-Atlantique department
- Les Moutiers-Hubert, in the Calvados department

== See also ==
- Esves-le-Moutier, in the Indre-et-Loire department
- Fain-lès-Moutiers, in the Côte-d'Or department
- Jouy-le-Moutier, in the Val-d'Oise department
- Juigné-des-Moutiers, in the Loire-Atlantique department
- Les Trois-Moutiers, in the Vienne department
- Marville-Moutiers-Brûlé, in the Eure-et-Loir department
- Saint-Pierre-le-Moûtier, in the Nièvre department
- Thin-le-Moutier, in the Ardennes department
- Vieil-Moutier, in the Pas-de-Calais department
- Villy-le-Moutier, in the Côte-d'Or department
