= La Coudre =

La Coudre may refer to:

- La Coudre, Deux-Sèvres, a commune of the department of Deux-Sèvres, France
- La Coudre, Neuchâtel, a former municipality of the Canton of Neuchâtel, in Switzerland
- La Coudre, Vaud, a village of the Canton of Vaud, Switzerland
