= L'Isle-Jourdain =

L'Isle-Jourdain may refer to:

- Lordship of L'Isle-Jourdain, centred on L'Isle-Jourdain, Gers
- communes in France:
  - L'Isle-Jourdain, Gers, in the Gers department
  - L'Isle-Jourdain, Vienne in the Vienne department
