= Church of Saint-Paixent =

12th-century Romanesque church in L'Isle-Jourdain, Vienne, France

- Église Saint-Paixent
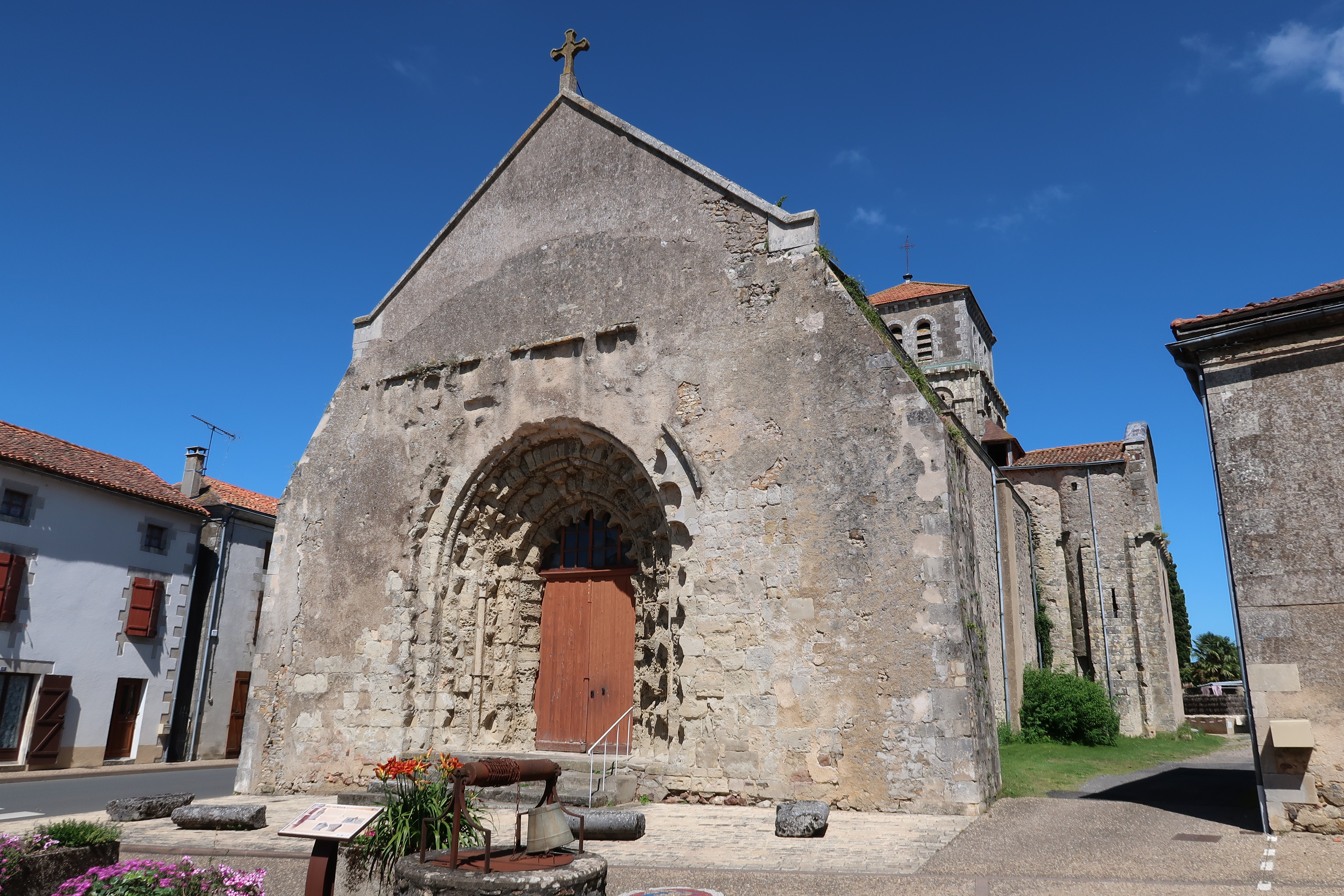
- Exterior view of the Church of Saint-Paixent

Religion
- Affiliation: Roman Catholic Church
- Province: Poitiers
- Rite: Latin Rite
- Status: Active

Location
- Location: 18 Rte d'Adriers
- Municipality: L'Isle-Jourdain
- Country: France
- Interactive map of Church of Saint-Paixent
- Coordinates: 46.23268°N 0.69667°E

Architecture
- Type: Church
- Style: Romanesque
- Completed: 11th–12th century
- Dome: 1
- Designated as NHL: 11 July 1973

The Church of Saint-Paixent is a 12th-century Romanesque church in L'Isle-Jourdain, Vienne, France. A former dependency of the Benedictine Abbey of Moutier-d'Ahun, the building served a small priory until the 18th century and became a parish church in the 19th century. It has been listed as a monument historique since 1973.

== History ==
The church was recorded in 1124 as a dependency of the Benedictine Abbey of Moutier-d'Ahun (Creuse). Established to serve a small priory, the community followed the Rule of Saint Benedict, a monastic lifestyle reflected in the building's iconographic programme. Following the French Revolution, the priory was suppressed and the church was attached to the parish of Millac. It has functioned as a parish church since the 19th century.

Historically, the church formed part of the Priory of Saint-Paixent, a contiguous monastic complex. The adjacent domestic building, which served as the priory lodgings, retains 12th-century masonry, a monastic well, and original stone carvings. These include an Ichthys (fish symbol) identical to those found within the church sanctuary, indicating a unified construction phase.

In 1876, the building underwent significant structural restoration, including the reconstruction of the nave vaulting and the upper portion of the bell tower.

Cultural records indicate that local traditions remained active until the 1960s, including annual processions of the statue of Notre-Dame de Saint-Paixent, which was traditionally dressed in handmade lace. The church was formally listed as a monument historique on 11 July 1973.

== Dedication ==
The church is dedicated to Saint Paixent (also spelled Paxent), an early Bishop of Poitiers. According to ecclesiastical records, he was the successor of Saint Hilary in the 4th century.

The veneration of Saint Paixent is largely restricted to west-central France, and dedications in his name are rare. Documented examples of other churches bearing this name include:

- The Église Saint-Paxent in Cluis (Indre)
- The Abbey and parish church of Massay (Cher)
- The Église Saint-Paixent in Champniers-et-Reilhac (Dordogne)

The choice of this dedication in L'Isle-Jourdain reflects the historical jurisdictional influence of the Diocese of Poitiers over the region.

== Architecture ==
The church is constructed on a Latin cross plan, a standard Romanesque configuration. It consists of a single nave of three bays opening onto a transept featuring semicircular absidioles. The interior side walls of the nave are reinforced by large pointed arches (arcatures brisées).

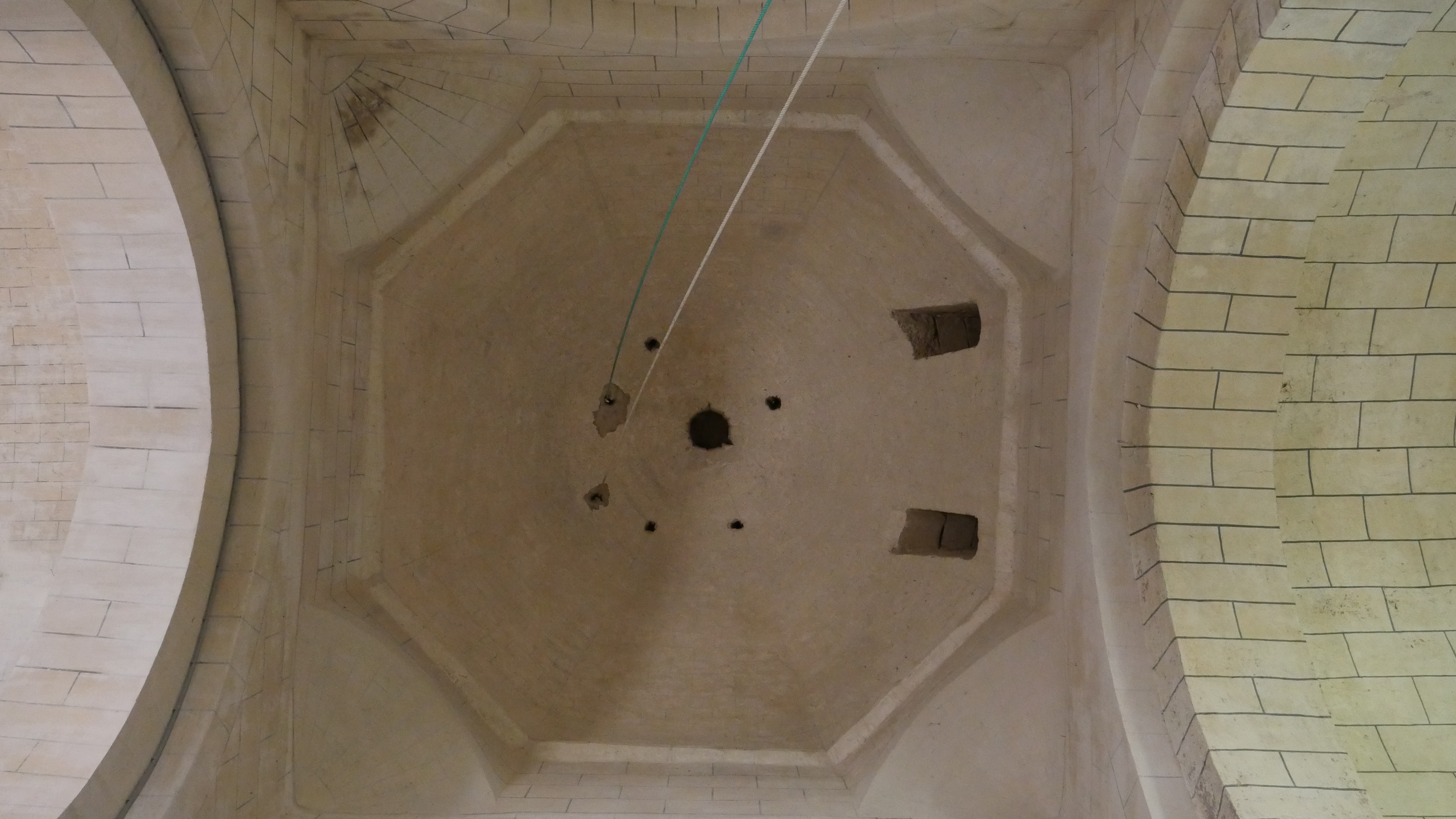
The octagonal dome of the central crossing, supported by four corner squinches (trompes).

The central crossing is covered by an octagonal dome supported by squinches (trompes). This geometric transition allows the square-plan bell tower to distribute its vertical load effectively onto the four central pillars of the crossing. While the primary masonry is 12th-century, the nave vaulting was reconstructed during the 1876 restoration.

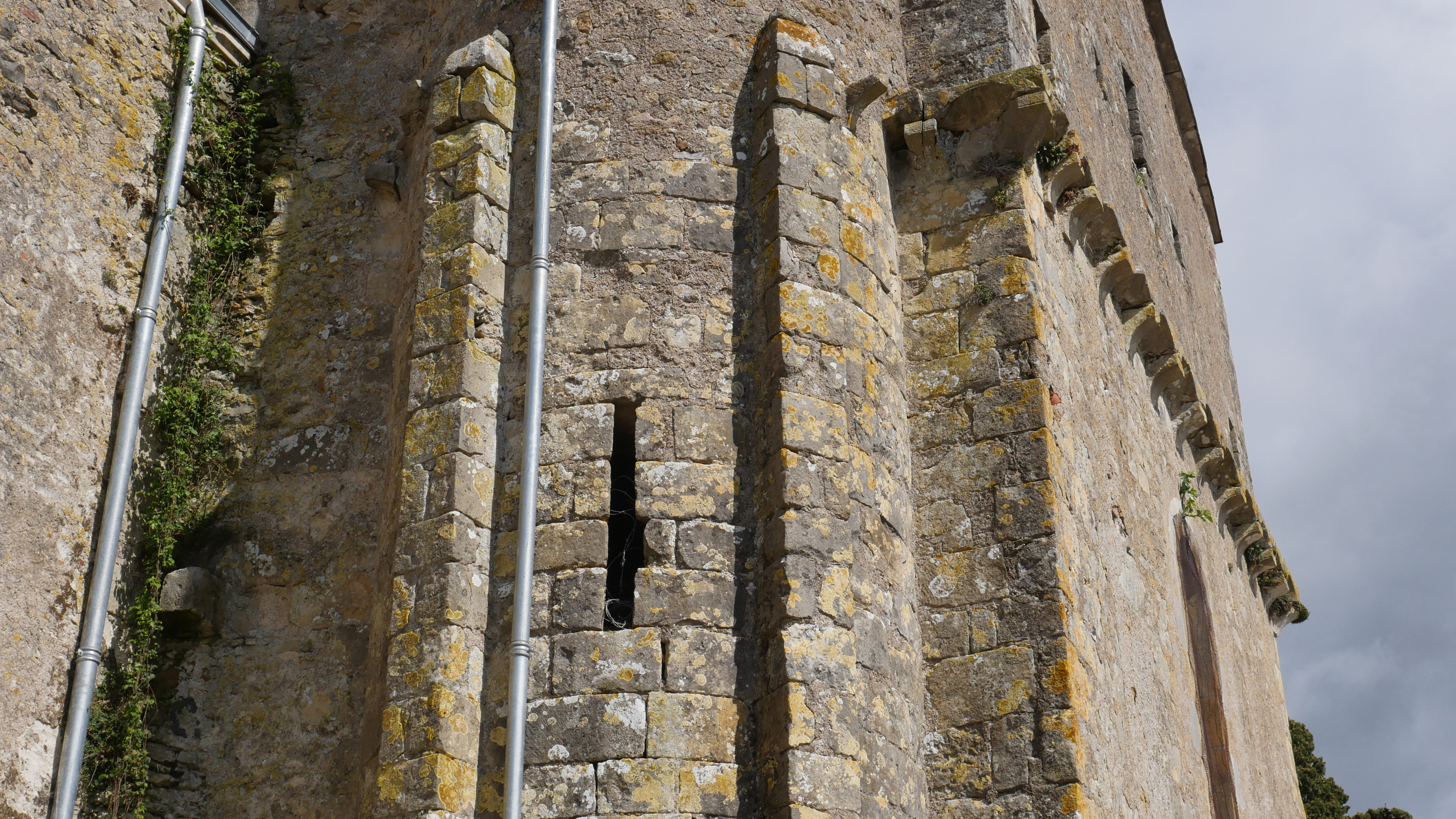
A 15th-century defensive arrow slit (archère) located on the exterior of the chevet.

The eastern chevet and the transept arms retain structural evidence of 15th- or 16th-century fortifications. These include narrow arrow slits (archères), indicating the building's secondary function as a defensive refuge during regional conflicts.

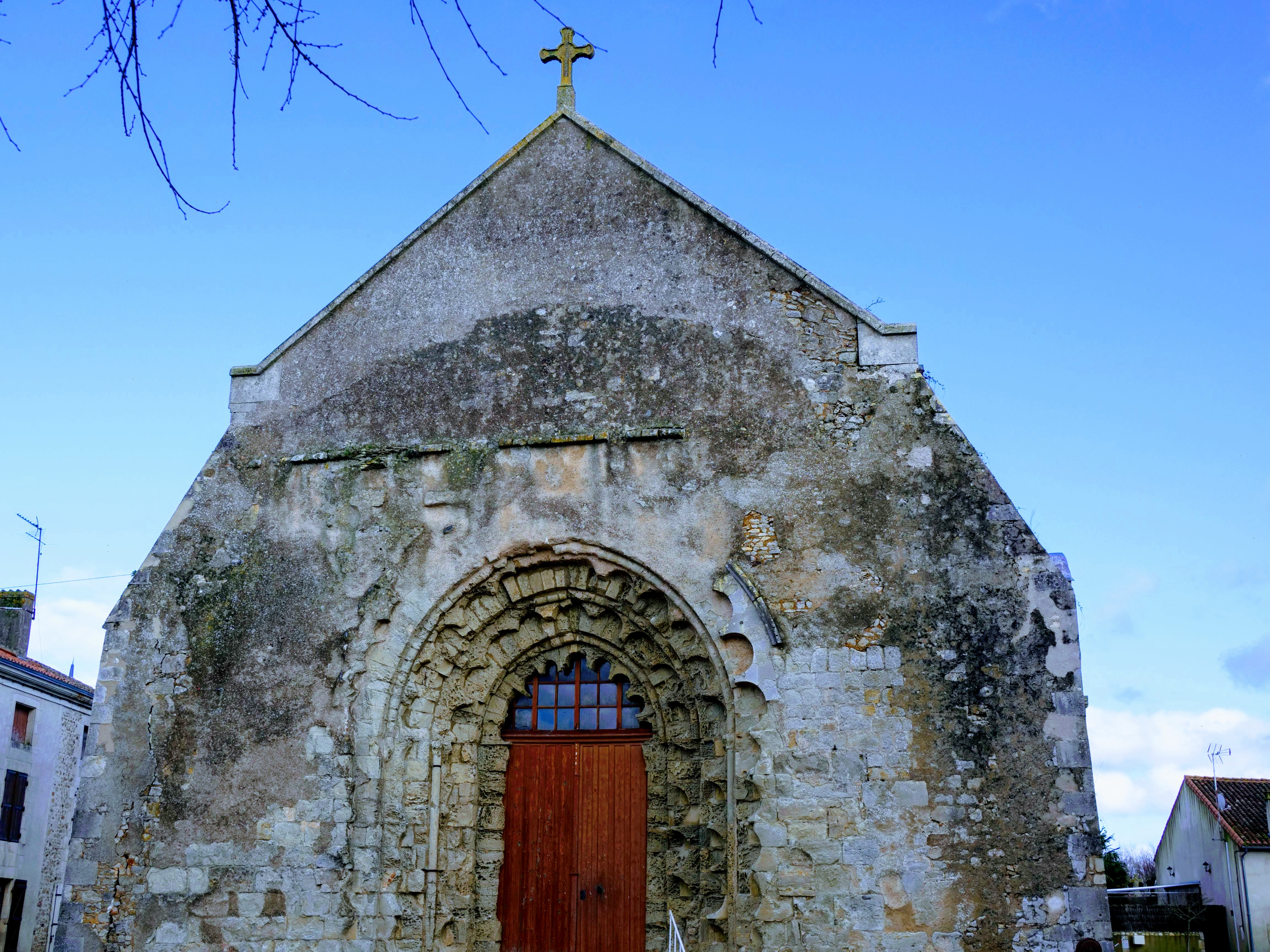
The western portal featuring the characteristic Limousin polylobed arch.

The western facade features a polylobed portal, an ornamental feature characteristic of the Limousin Romanesque style. This decorative influence is frequently found in churches along the pilgrimage routes of the region.

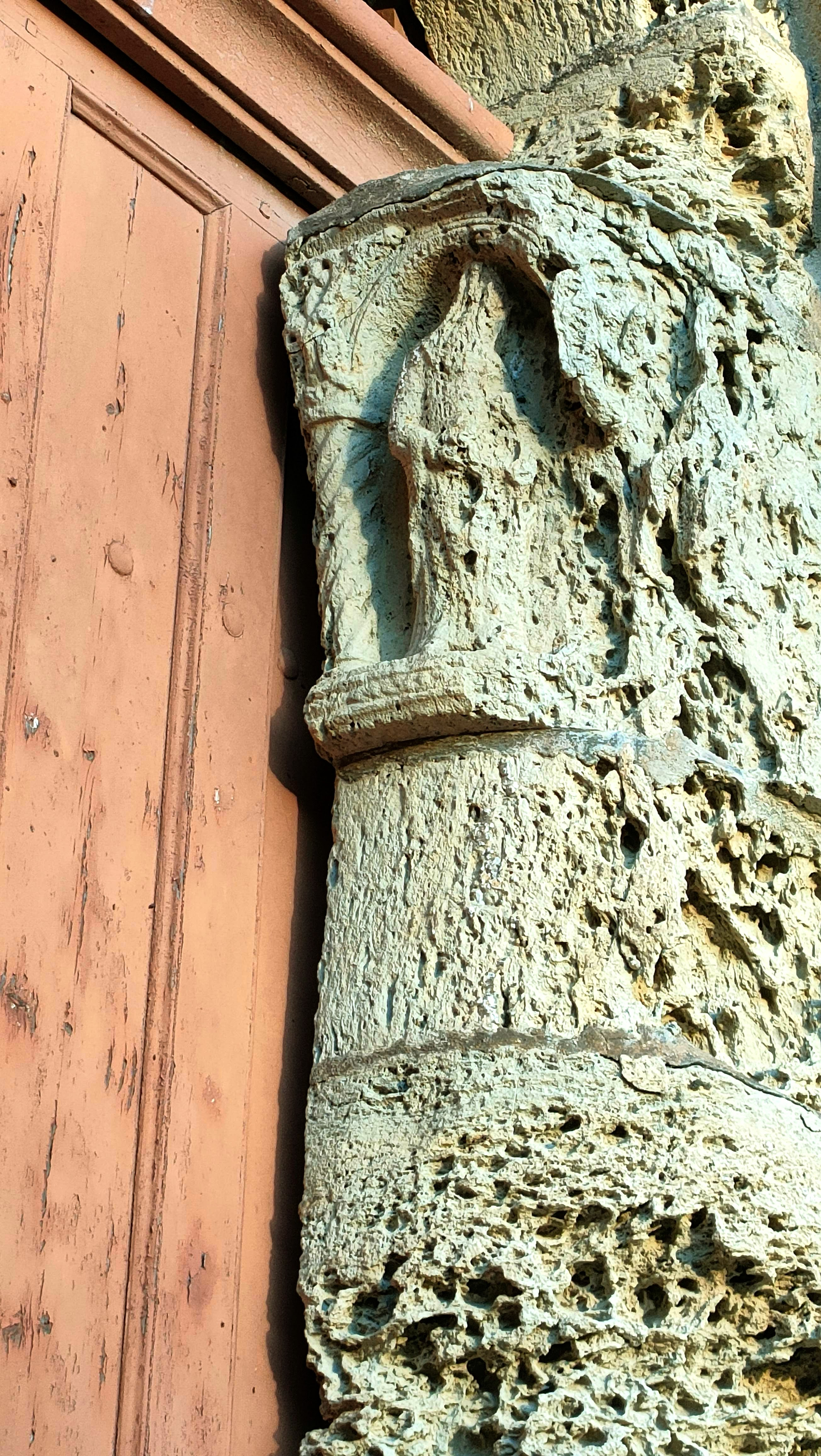
Detail of a weathered vestigial statue located within the masonry of the portal arch.

The archways of the portal contain traces of original stone sculpture. Although significantly weathered by centuries of exposure, a small vestigial statue remains visible within the masonry, representing the final remnants of the doorway's original decorative scheme.

== Iconography ==
=== The Romanesque Capital ===
The church houses a rare 12th-century historiated capital on the northwest pillar of the transept crossing. Carved from local limestone, it represents a sophisticated didactic programme centred on the Benedictine theme of Ausculta ("Listen") the opening command of the Rule of Saint Benedict. The capital is noted for its exceptional symbolic density, likely designed by a monk of the Moutier-d'Ahun community to illustrate the "invisible combat" of the monastic life.

The placement of the figures follows a strict spatial logic tied to the orientation of the church:

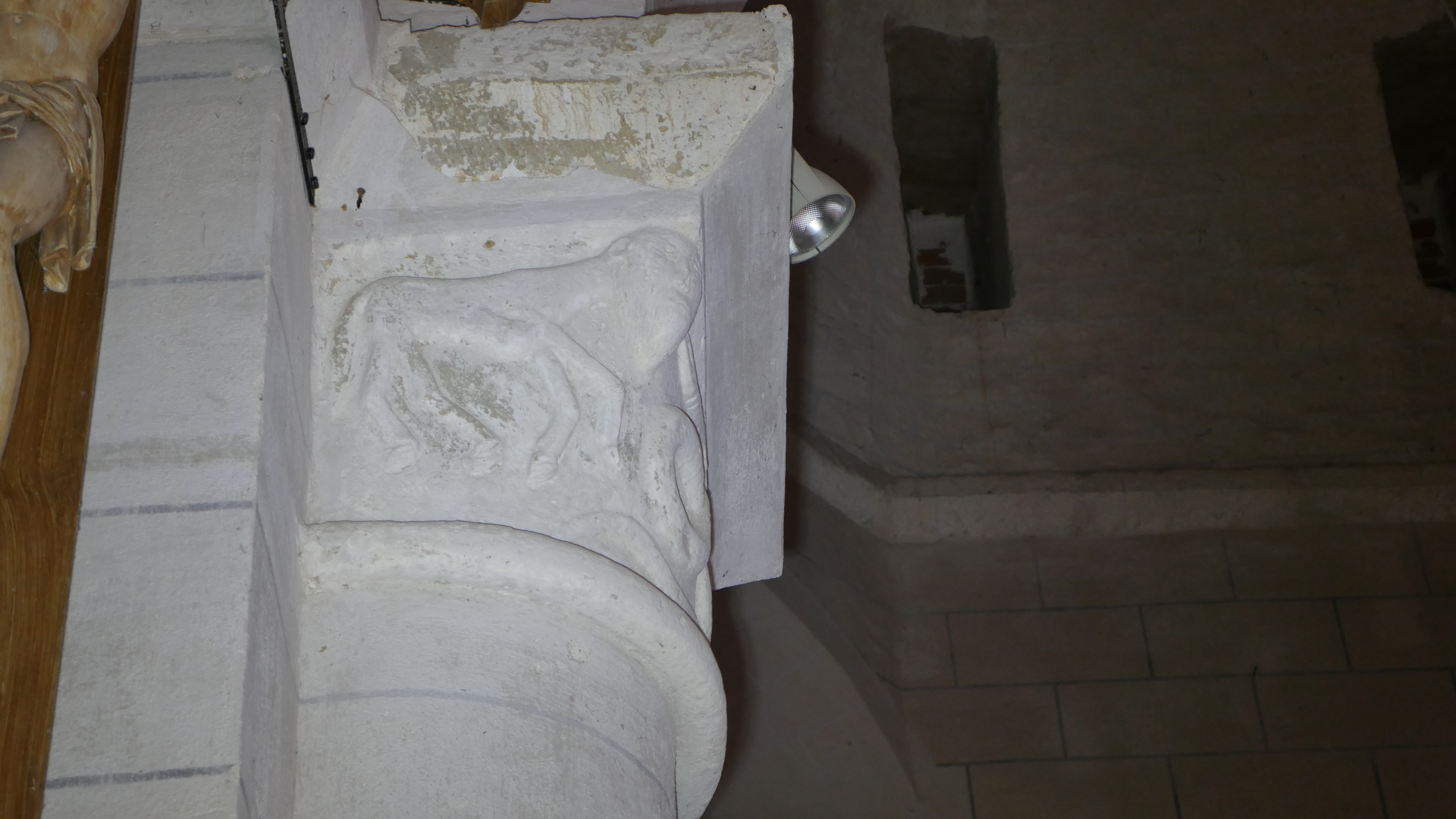
West face: The human-headed donkey (Sloth), facing the darkness of the Occident.

- West Face (The Fall): Oriented toward the "Occident" (from the Latin occidere, "to fall"), this face represents the space of darkness and spiritual chaos. It features a human-headed donkey, a hybrid symbolising spiritual sloth. The sculptor uses the donkey—the most "despised" of animals in medieval bestiaries, to represent a carnal soul that has become animalistic by refusing the spiritual labour of listening to the divine word.

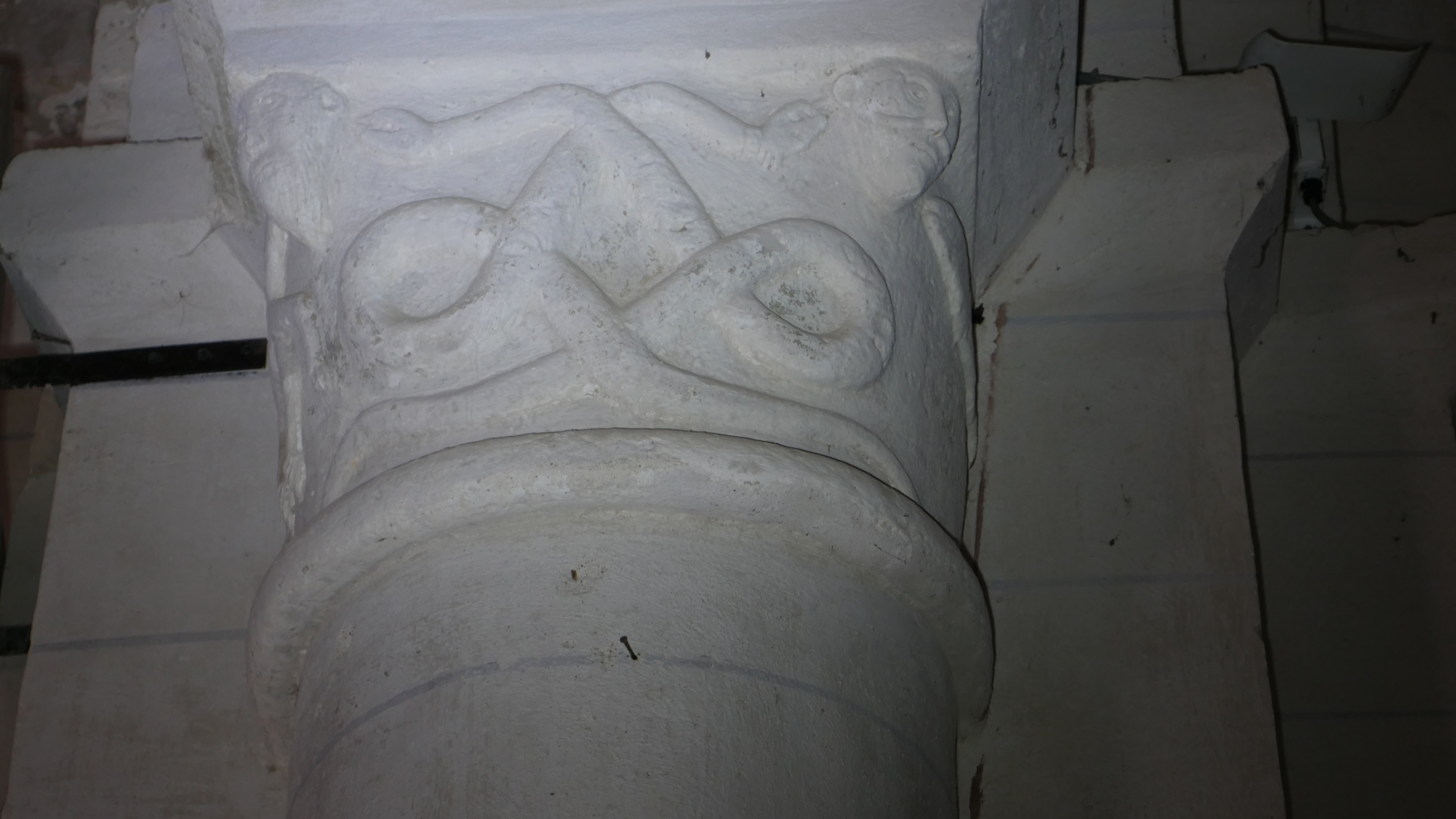
South face: The Temptation of the ears.

- South Face (The Temptation): Depicts symmetrical, smooth-skinned serpents whispering into the ears of human figures. This is a visual translation of the "itching ears" (prurientes auribus) described in 2 Timothy 4:3, where the faithful turn away from truth to follow myths. The serpents are shown "tickling" the ears, illustrating how easily the soul is distracted from prayer by sensory vanity and worldly myths.

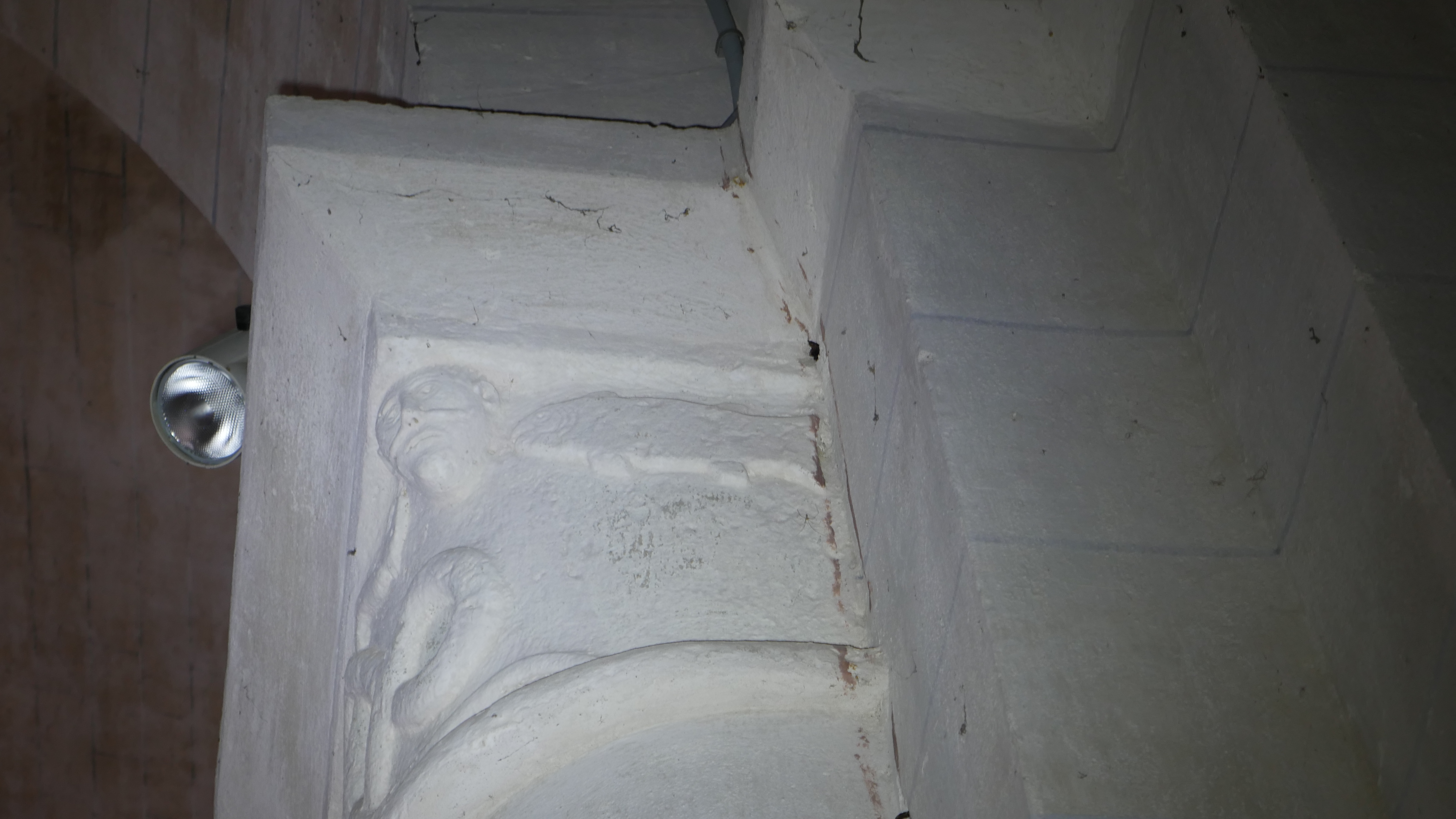
East face: Redemption, facing the light of the sanctuary.

- East Face (The Redemption): Oriented toward the sanctuary and the rising sun (the Light), this face represents the "Intermediate Coming" or the presence of God in the heart. It features a monk with a circular tonsure and a fish (Ichthys). The fish is an extreme iconographic rarity in 12th-century Romanesque sculpture, as the symbol had largely fallen out of use since the early Christian era. The monk’s face features deliberate "slashes" (balafres), signifying the physical and spiritual scars of the "good fight" required to achieve redemption.

=== Statue of Saint Paixent ===
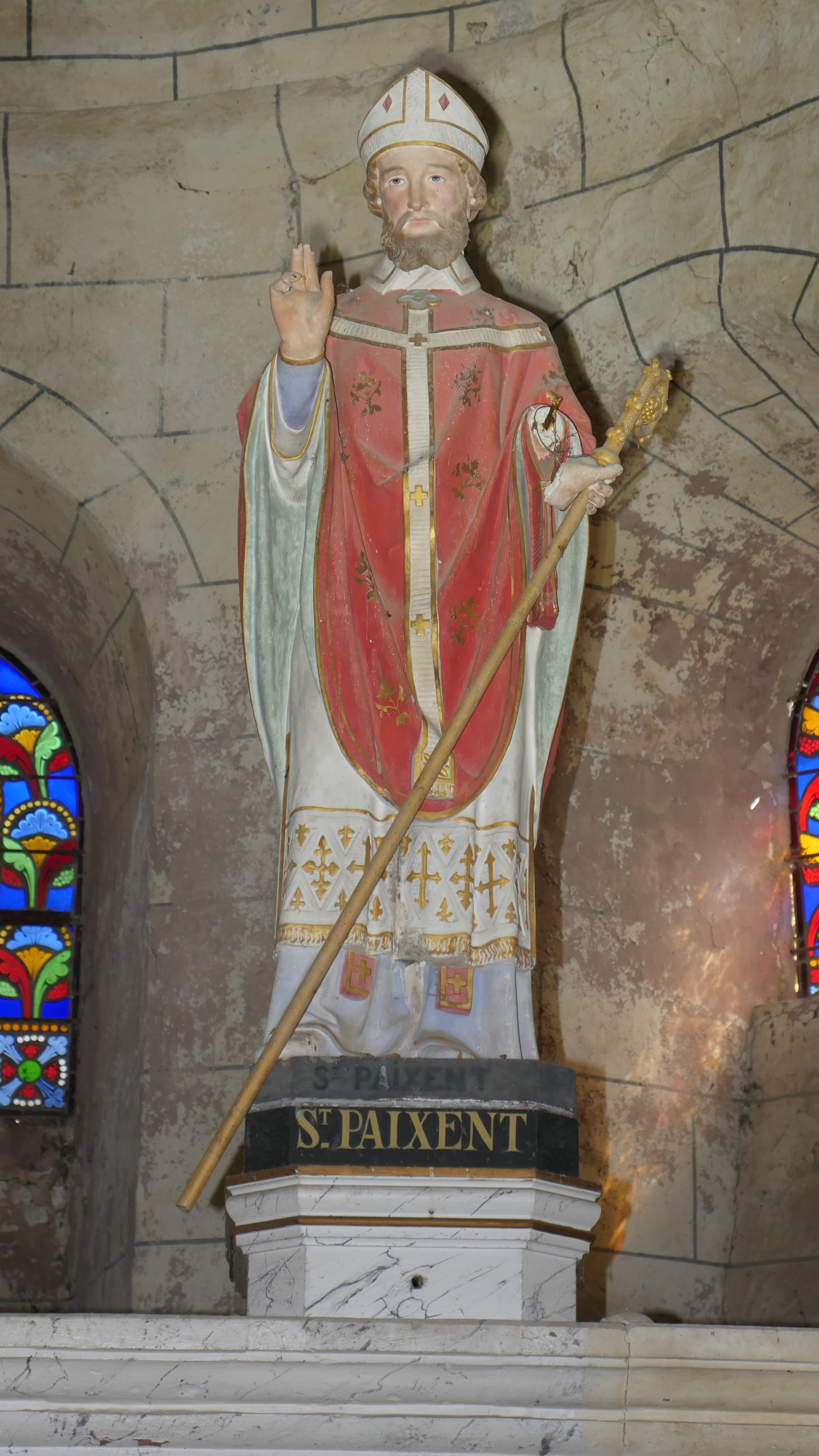
The 19th-century polychrome statue of Saint Paixent.

The church preserves a 19th-century polychrome statue of its namesake, Saint Paixent (Saint Paxent), measuring 130 cm in height. The saint is depicted in episcopal vestments, wearing a mitre and holding a crozier, consistent with his role as an early Bishop of Poitiers. The statue's high-relief polychromy is characteristic of the Gothic Revival style prevalent in the Vienne department during the late 19th century.

=== Statue of Notre-Dame de Saint-Paixent ===
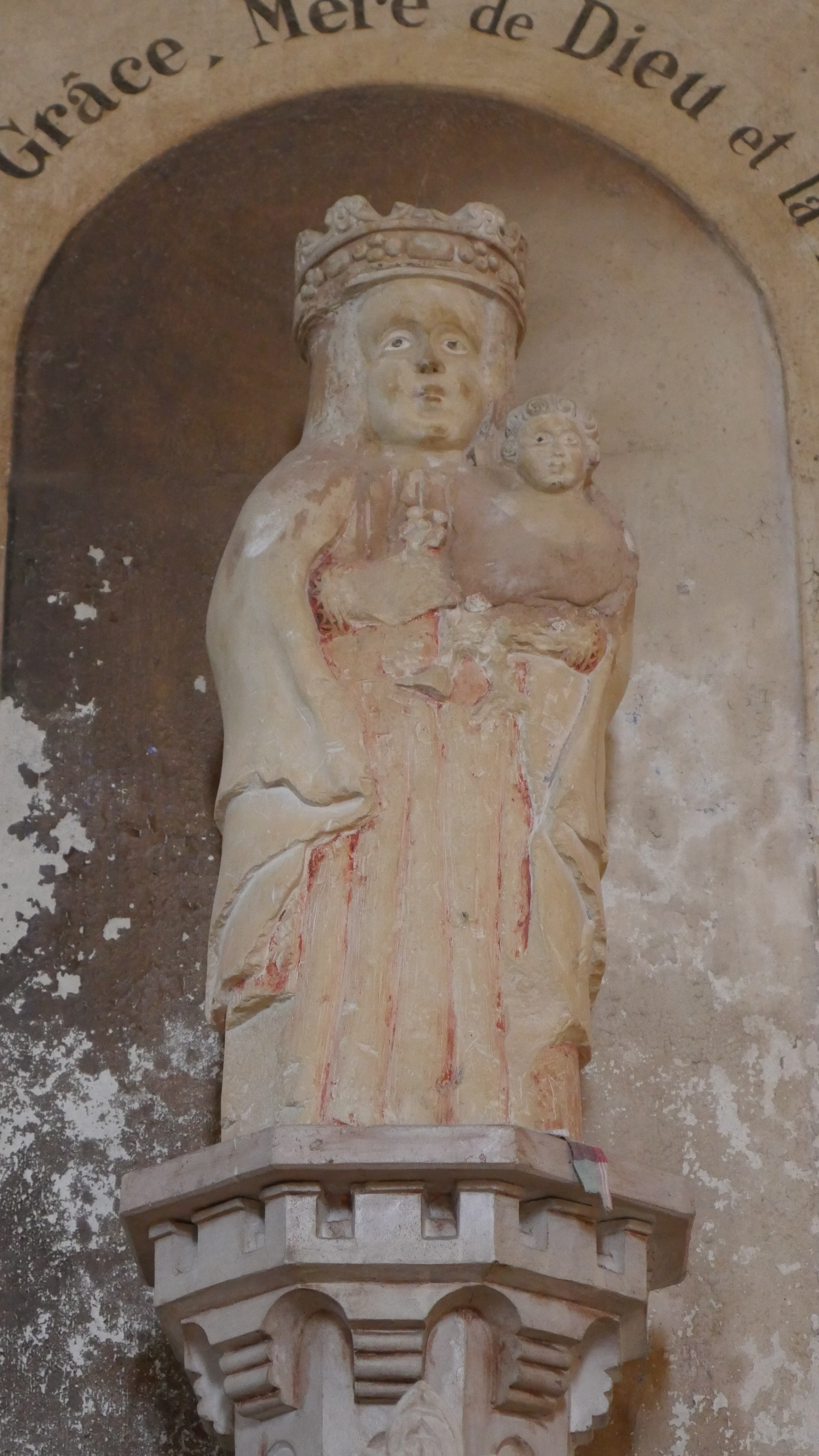
The statue of Notre-Dame de Saint-Paixent.

Located in the nave, this 62 cm polychrome stone statue represents a unique intersection of folk tradition and formal liturgy. Its portable scale made it the focal point of local processions until the 1960s, during which the statue was traditionally dressed in handmade lace. This practice highlights the specific cultural heritage of the Saint-Paixent community and reinforces the theme of the "attentive heart" (coeur attentif), with the Virgin Mary serving as the ultimate model of one who listens to the Word.
