= Priory of Saint-Paixent =

12th-century monastic complex in Vienne, France

Saint-Paixent Priory
- Prieuré de Saint-Paixent
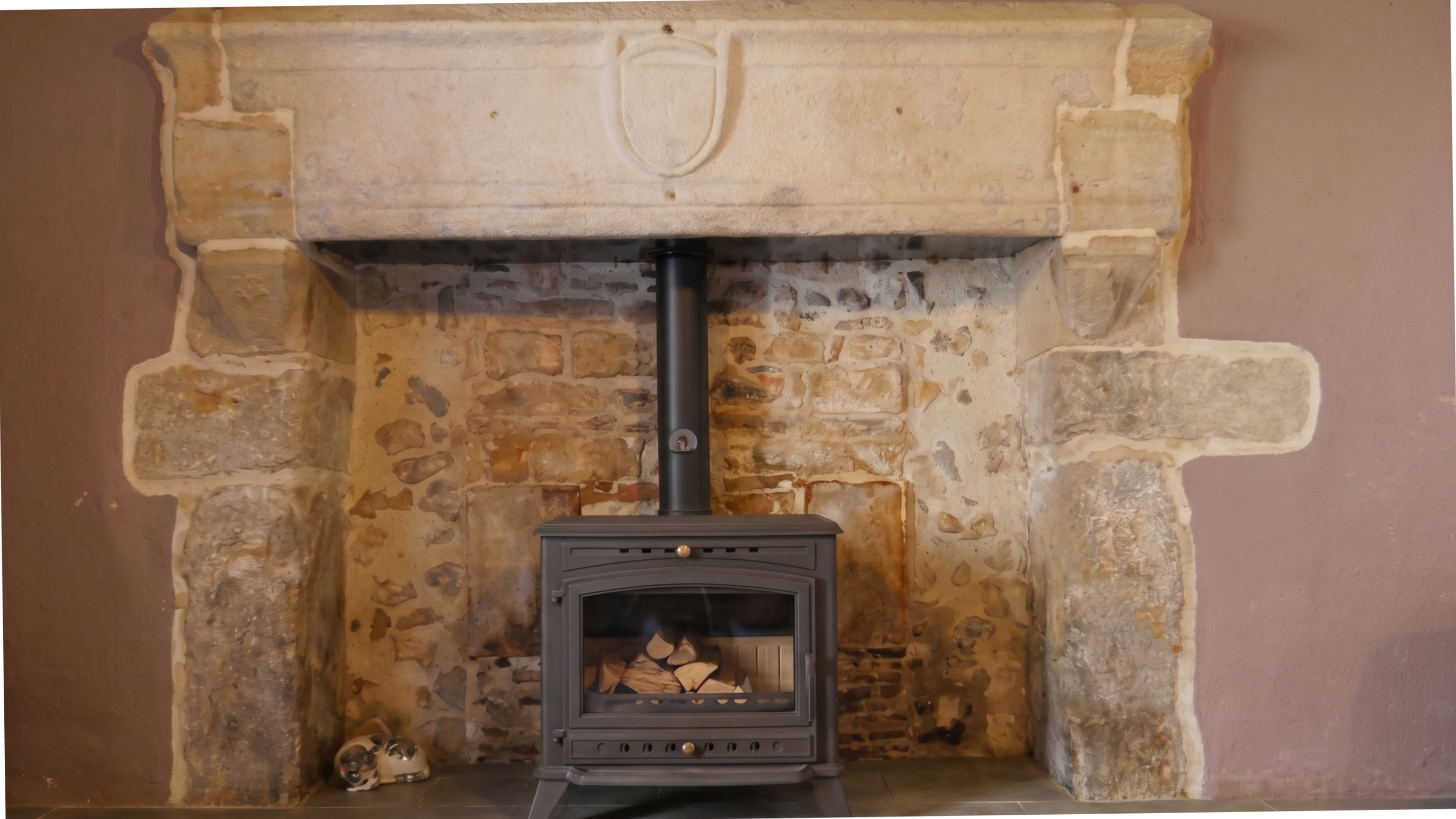
- Ground-floor monumental fireplace within the domestic prioral lodgings
- Interactive map of Saint-Paixent Priory

Monastery information
- Order: Benedictine (Cluniac)
- Established: 12th century
- Disestablished: 18th century

Site
- Location: L'Isle-Jourdain, Vienne
- Country: France
- Coordinates: 46°13′57″N 0°41′12″E

The Priory of Saint-Paixent (Prieuré de Saint-Paixent) is a former monastic complex in L'Isle-Jourdain, in the Vienne department of Nouvelle-Aquitaine, France.

It adjoins the Church of Saint-Paixent, which is recorded from 1124 as a dependency of Moutier-d'Ahun Abbey and later served as the seat of a small Benedictine priory. The surviving domestic buildings preserve architectural and carved stone features that have been associated with the medieval religious complex.

== History ==
=== Medieval Foundations and Royal Itinerary ===
The priory features an established connection to royal administrative itineraries of the early 13th century. On 15 August 1214, King John visited the location during his military and administrative campaigns in Poitou, an event documented within the royal close rolls (Rotuli Litterarum Clausarum), where the monastic site is recorded under the Latin designation Sanctum Peisanc.

The royal visit occurred on the Feast of the Assumption, shortly after the English retreat from the Battle of Roche-au-Moine. The royal column moving through the Vienne valley during this campaign phase included high-ranking figures such as Hubert de Burgh, the Seneschal of Poitou, and Brother Alan Martel of the Knights Templar, who managed the campaign's financial ledgers. During this administrative stop, King John issued an explicit royal command on page 170 of the close rolls to his custodian, Peter de Maulay, ordering him to deliver a gilded silver chalice weighing two marks, either one brought from England or custom-fabricated on the spot, to the messenger of the Saint-Paixent monks as a royal benefaction. The original text concludes with King John's personal signature block, T. me ipso apud Sẽm Peisanc’, translating to English as, 'Witnessed by myself at Saint-Paixent'.

Primary Document Validation

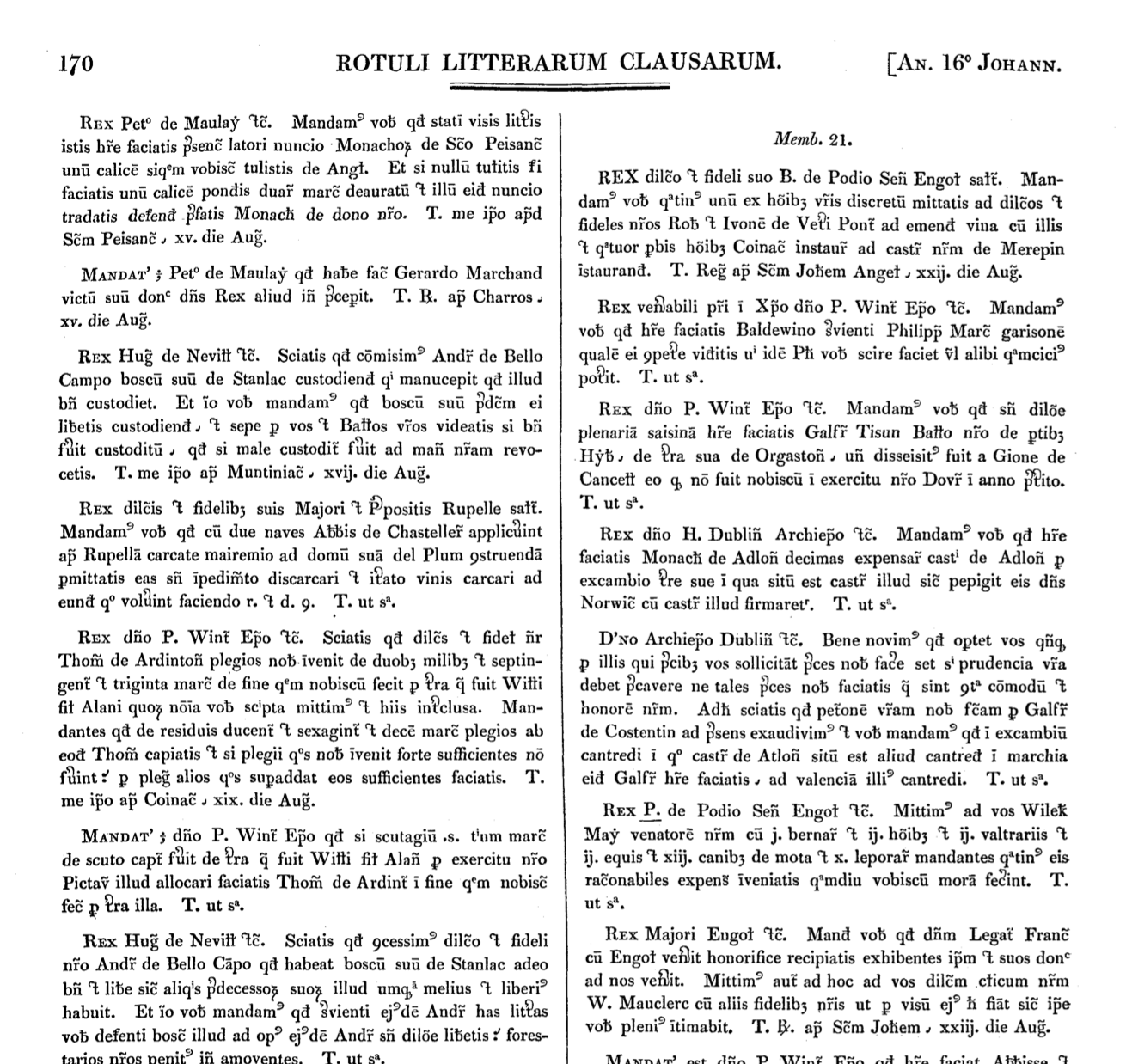
The entry on page 170 of the 1214 royal Close Rolls (Rotuli Litterarum Clausarum) recording the gilded chalice mandate and showing that King John signed the writ while at the Priory of Saint-Paixent (Sanctum Peisanc) on 15 August 1214.

=== Renaissance Feudal Tenure and Clerical Succession ===
Following King John's 1214 visit, a document gap of just over three centuries occurs in the surviving primary sources. The historical record resumes on the eve of the mid-16th century, where a continuous series of property deeds and clerical contracts reveals how the estate operated as a land-holding secular benefice (prieuré simple) within the historic parish of Millac. Under this standard administrative arrangement, the property no longer maintained a resident community of monks; instead, the official prior operated as an absentee administrator who collected the estate's revenues while outsourcing the daily religious services to a hired local secular priest. These early documents only survived because they were later gathered together as vital legal evidence during a major territorial lawsuit in 1733. Specifically, they were compiled under the direction of Dom Louis Périgaulde, the appointed general agent for the mother house at Moutier-d'Ahun Abbey, who retrieved the scattered parchment deeds from the local priory rooms to build a master legal archive for the royal judges.

The earliest of these records dates to 22 August 1524, when François du Chastenet, a local squire and Lord of Puiferrier, rendered formal feudal homage (reconnoissance) to the overarching Lord of L'Isle-Jourdain for his substantial manor house (hostel) at Saint-Paixent. This feudal agreement meant that the prominent estate was officially recognized as a tenant property dependent on the local secular lordship, and it explicitly recorded the house as sitting safely within the parish boundaries of Millac, a detail that proved crucial to verifying the priory's borders centuries later.

Clerical control over the priory's income and buildings shifted several decades later, on 5 November 1574, through a formal exchange contract (permutte). This agreement officially established a clerk named Maître Estienne de Monsereau as the new priest-prior of Saint-Paixent. In taking this office, Monsereau did not buy the property as a private home; instead, he assumed legal control over the priory’s "temporalities", which were the specific local assets dedicated to funding the church. These assets included the main prioral house, the enclosed service courtyard, two domestic gardens, and the legal right to collect agricultural tithes from the residents living in the surrounding borough.

As the local settlement grew around the priory walls, the surrounding borough (bourg) expanded with it. A cluster of private transactions among local residents, including a property deed on 4 May 1601, a family asset transfer on 7 August 1608, and a borough land exchange on 12 June 1610, repeatedly confirmed that this growing residential core sat directly within the priory's legal domain.

The monastic leadership actively managed these valuable commercial and legal rights into the 17th century to secure reliable revenue. On 28 June 1611, the priory formalised its authority over local commerce by certifying its entitlement to customary market tolls collected during the annual village fairs (les droits de coustumes des foires). Shortly thereafter, on 9 November 1611, Prior Siccard leased these official market fair tolls directly to the Marquis of L'Isle-Jourdain in exchange for a permanent annual rent of six livres. This commercial footprint was reinforced on 16 May 1612, when a noble neighbor named Jean de la Quintane, Lord of the Vigerie, registered a land deed acknowledging his holdings were bound by the priory's overarching territorial jurisdiction. This was followed on 9 July 1612 by a formal noble land registry (dénombrement), where the Marquis of L’Isle-Jourdain provided the Prior with an official declaration of the holdings connected to the nearby fortified seat known as the 'Vigerie'.

Because the official priors usually lived elsewhere and operated as non-resident clerks, the daily religious and practical operations of the complex were outsourced to hired secular priests. A three-year lease executed on 24 August 1625 reveals this domestic arrangement clearly when a priest named Pierre Dumas was contracted to run the altar services. In exchange for his daily labour, Dumas was granted an annual stipend of forty livres and ten bushels of rye. Crucially for the architectural history of the site, his contract also granted him a local tenancy consisting of half the monastic gardens and exactly two upper rooms located inside the main prioral house (deux chambres hautes en la maison presbiterale). This structural detail confirms that by the early 17th century, a single quadrant of the property, consisting of two upper rooms accessed from one side of the central staircase core, was already partitioned for private domestic tenancy.

The structural condition of these domestic assets became a matter of formal record two decades later. Following the death of a long-serving prior, a regional court official named Gabriel de Salles, serving as the chatelain and royal judge of L’Isle-Jourdain, arrived at the estate on 2 May 1634 to conduct a meticulous, room-by-room structural inspection (procès-verbal de visite). This survey officially documented the physical state of the main priory house, its stables, and its outbuildings to prevent the previous prior's family from hiding structural neglect or diverting church income into private hands.

By the autumn of 1634, this systemic administrative absenteeism resulted in severe structural neglect and physical decay. An official ecclesiastical inspection conducted on 15 October 1634 by Jean Filleau and Denys Guillotteau, commissioners of the Grands Jours de Poitiers, recorded that the complex was operating as a dependency under the Order of Saint Augustine, led by commendatory prior Emanuel Bernard de la Béraudière. The judicial report detailed severe structural deterioration, noting that one-sixth of the church roof was completely uncovered and that the windows surrounding the main altar lacked glass, allowing the elements to disrupt services. To fund the urgent repairs, the commissioners ordered that one-third of the priory's annual temporal revenue be sequestered from the tenant priest, Marc Simonnet, via a public auction managed by the fiscal procurator of L'Isle-Jourdain.

=== 17th-Century Structural Reports and Sacramental Warfare ===
While the complex operated as a Cluniac Benedictine dependency on the eve of the French Revolution, judicial inspections confirm it was historically an autonomous cell of the Order of Saint Augustine. On 15 October 1634, a supreme judicial inspection was executed on the site by Maître Jean Filleau and Dr Denys Guillotteau under direct mandates from the royal 'Grands Jours' courts, which were extraordinary judicial sessions sent by the King to fix regional administration and neglect.

The resulting structural report revealed severe architectural neglect, documenting collapsed roof sections near the entrance and missing window glazing around the high altar. To remedy this decay caused by non-resident management, the royal commissioners issued a binding enforcement order to the estate's local tenant farmer, Marc Simonnet. The decree legally compelled Simonnet to withhold exactly one-third of the priory's annual rental income from the absentee prior, redirecting those funds directly into a dedicated holding account to pay for the urgent masonry and roofing repairs.

Legal possession of the estate under canon law was reasserted through highly regulated, on-site physical rituals, which served as the official legal method for securing a property title before modern land registries existed. On 9 January 1653, René Gervais took formal possession of the priory via a papal provision. Because Gervais was based far away in the Diocese of Tours, the ceremony was executed by his local proxy, Jehan Rabethe, who was the Prior of L'Isle-Jourdain. Accompanied by two royal notaries, Rabethe physically entered the priory church, sprinkled holy water, prayed before the high altar, kissed the altar stone, took his seat in the prior's stall, and rang the belfry bell to legally assert his territorial jurisdiction.

This ritual perimeter walk was repeated between 8:00 and 9:00 AM on 18 June 1669 by the incoming Prior, François de Rouhet. Guided by the resident priest, Émery Delpeux, Rouhet processed bare-headed around the outside structural fabric of the building to visually and legally define his property lines to the gathered community.

Because the site operated as an investment benefice rather than a standard parish cure, bitter conflicts over territorial control erupted between the monastery and the local parish clergy. These disputes were fundamentally financial, as performing vital sacraments carried mandatory fees. When the hired priory priests attempted to perform localized baptisms, marriages, or burials for the borough inhabitants, the Curé of Millac filed a formal royal lawsuit on 8 January 1677 to protect his exclusive pastoral rights and revenues.

This sacramental warfare eventually forced an uneasy compromise. Following an archidiaconal review on 20 November 1682, the Curé of Millac began issuing a series of highly regulated written concessions, including permits in the summer of 1698 and early 1700. These documents allowed localized baptisms and burials to be performed by the priory priests purely as a derivative privilege, granted simply because the significant geographic distance to the main parish church in Millac made travelling there too difficult for the local population.

=== 18th-Century Episcopal Interdicts and Courtyard Division ===
Pastoral friction between the priory and the parish clergy escalated into the eighteenth century, culminating in restrictions on major liturgical functions. Following an inspection on 10 November 1711, Bishop Jean-Claude of Poitiers issued a strict episcopal decree ordering the prior to immediately purchase proper liturgical vestments for the chancel and explicitly banning the priory from celebrating Easter communion (les pâques) for the local borough residents, legally reinforcing that they were strictly parishioners of the Curé of Millac. Internal administration also remained disorganized; during an asset audit on 13 October 1714, Sub-deacon François Patarin arrived to log the priory's legal assets, forcing Prior de Rouhet to formally admit that the complex maintained no formal clerk's office or archive furniture (il n'a ny gresfe ny registres), with centuries of historical records stored loosely within the domestic quarters.

The documented layout of these residential quarters was further detailed on 30 August 1728, when Prior Jean d’Orfeuille recorded in a formal tax declaration that the prioral residence (maison prieurialle) was vertically configured with exactly two first-floor upper rooms situated beneath an open timber loft (deux chambres hautes, un grenier par le dessus). While this tax description only accounted for a single two-room residential tier above the ground-floor agricultural spaces, the continuous timber loft and the central staircase design indicate the physical building footprint already encompassed the broader multi-wing layout, suggesting the declaration specifically defined the localized prior's quarters rather than the entire structural complex.

This shared usage of the corporate estate eventually caused a total logistical and physical breakdown between the monastic priors and the local parish curates on the eve of the French Revolution. On 1 April 1759, Dom Joseph Gilbert Poncet took possession of the church, touching the physical iron bolts and latches (touchés des Verrouils) of the primary monastic portal to assert his title. Following Poncet's rapid resignation, incoming Cluniac Prior Dom Louis Périgaulde de Roche Neuve arrived at 8:00 AM on 17 May 1759 alongside the royal notary Jean Patharin de Lagasne to claim the title. While Roche Neuve successfully entered the nave to complete his altar prayers and ring the belfry bell, they were blocked from completing the canonical installation because the resident curate, Louis Dassat, had locked the tabernacle and deliberately walked away with the keys. The ceremony was forced to conclude outside the main doors in the presence of local residents, including the barrister Jean de Louradour, Sieur de Belleisle.

To assess the operational damage following this lockout, a formal building survey was executed on 16 July 1759 by Augustin Patharin, the Curé of Luchapt. The inspection revealed severe structural neglect within the priory's integrated domestic and agricultural block. The heavy wooden entry doors of the ground-floor barn, which stood facing the courtyard tier, were completely rotted, falling off their timber frames ('totalement poury... tombent par Lembaults'), and entirely devoid of functional iron hardware. Furthermore, because the internal volume of this lower agricultural tier remained completely open and undivided, Curate Dassat's loose livestock and poultry were running rampant through the prior's crop storage area, eating and destroying the tithe grains. The surveyors noted that the large garden (grand jardin) was entirely overgrown, its perimeter drainage ditches completely filled in, and its ancient apple and pear trees half-dead. To protect the financial interests of the estate, the surveyors recommended a permanent engineering solution: physically bisecting the communal barn space down the middle via the erection of a solid internal stone partition wall (un mur de refonte or mur de refend).

Following this recommendation, extensive structural renovations were funded via post-mortem repair lawsuits between the Cluniac order and the heirs of former Prior d'Orfeuille. Regional master stonemasons Barthélemy and Jean de Villars logged 87.5 days of physical labour repairing the core church masonry by 29 November 1762, which included the construction of the permanent stone partition wall and secure locking mechanisms to isolate the properties. This physical bisection of the external agricultural spaces systematically forced a corresponding division within the main house itself, establishing the permanent architectural footprint and twin residential layout that defines the modern separation of Numbers 9 and 11 Route d'Adriers. Barthélemy de Villars subsequently spent 35 days in November 1764 executing specialized structural repairs within the chancel vaults, the sacristy, the sanctuary, and the belfry mechanisms. Jean de Villars concluded the program on 30 November 1765 by installing comprehensive carpentry and roof re-shingling over the integrated side chapels of St John and St Mary Magdalene.
