= La Chapelle-Gaudin =

- Part of Argentonnay
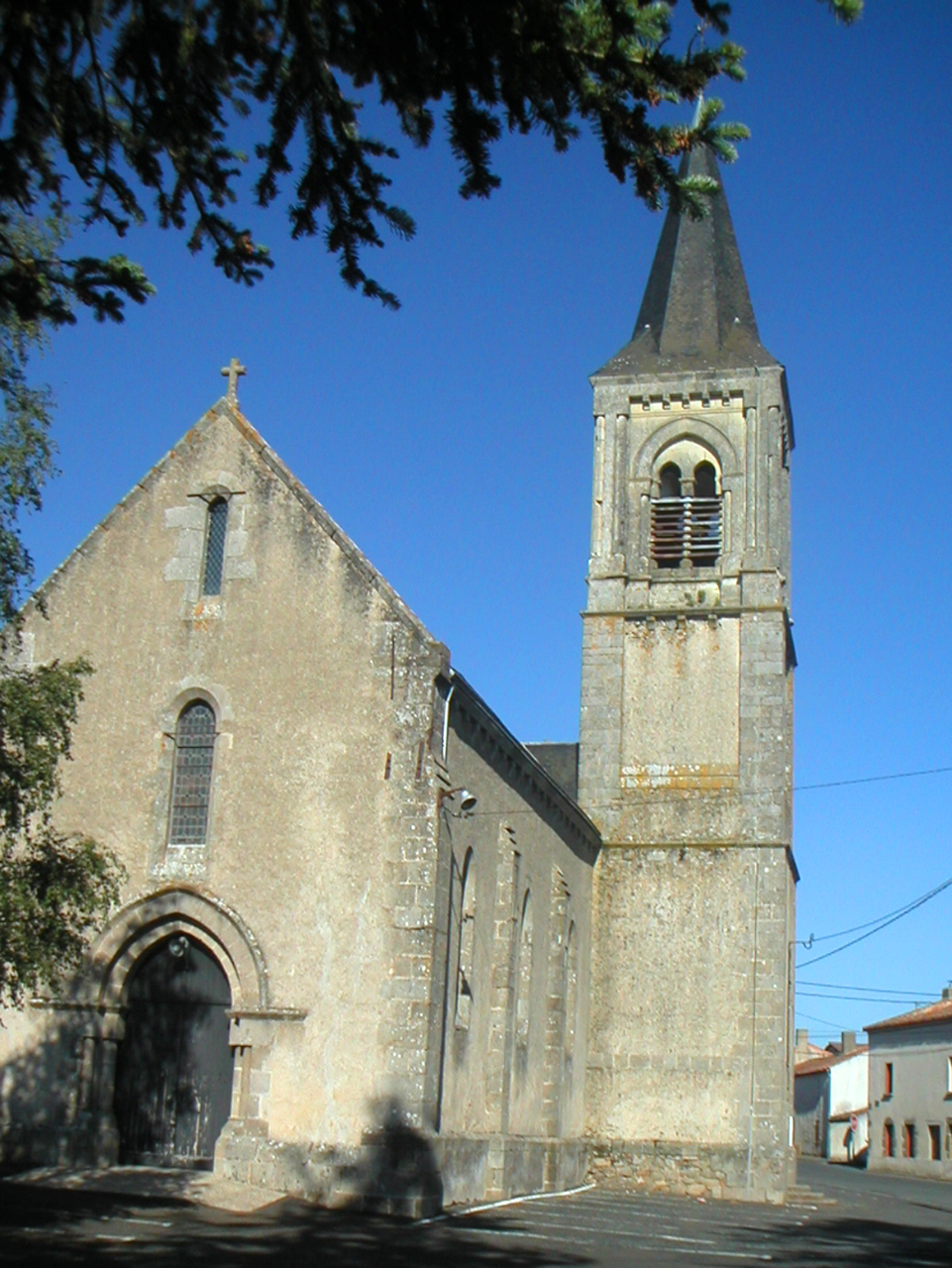
- The church in La Chapelle-Gaudin
- Location of La Chapelle-Gaudin
- Location within France Location within Nouvelle-Aquitaine
- Coordinates: 46°55′56″N 0°22′50″W
- Country: France
- Region: Nouvelle-Aquitaine
- Department: Deux-Sèvres
- Arrondissement: Bressuire
- Canton: Saint-Varent
- Commune: Argentonnay
- Area^{1}: 17.01 km^{2} (6.57 sq mi)
- Elevation: 1,600 m (5,200 ft)
- Highest elevation: 166 m (545 ft)
- Lowest elevation: 101 m (331 ft)
- Population (2022): 243
  - Density: 14.3/km^{2} (37.0/sq mi)
- Time zone: UTC+01:00 (CET)
  - Summer (DST): UTC+02:00 (CEST)
- Postal code: 79300
- ^{1} French Land Register data, which excludes lakes, ponds, glaciers > 1 km^{2} (0.386 sq mi or 247 acres) and river estuaries.

La Chapelle-Gaudin (French pronunciation: [la ʃapɛl ɡodɛ̃]) is a former commune in the Deux-Sèvres department in western France. On 1 January 2016, it was merged into the new commune Argentonnay.

== See also ==
- Communes of the Deux-Sèvres department
