= Le Breuil-sous-Argenton =

- Delegated commune of Argentonnay
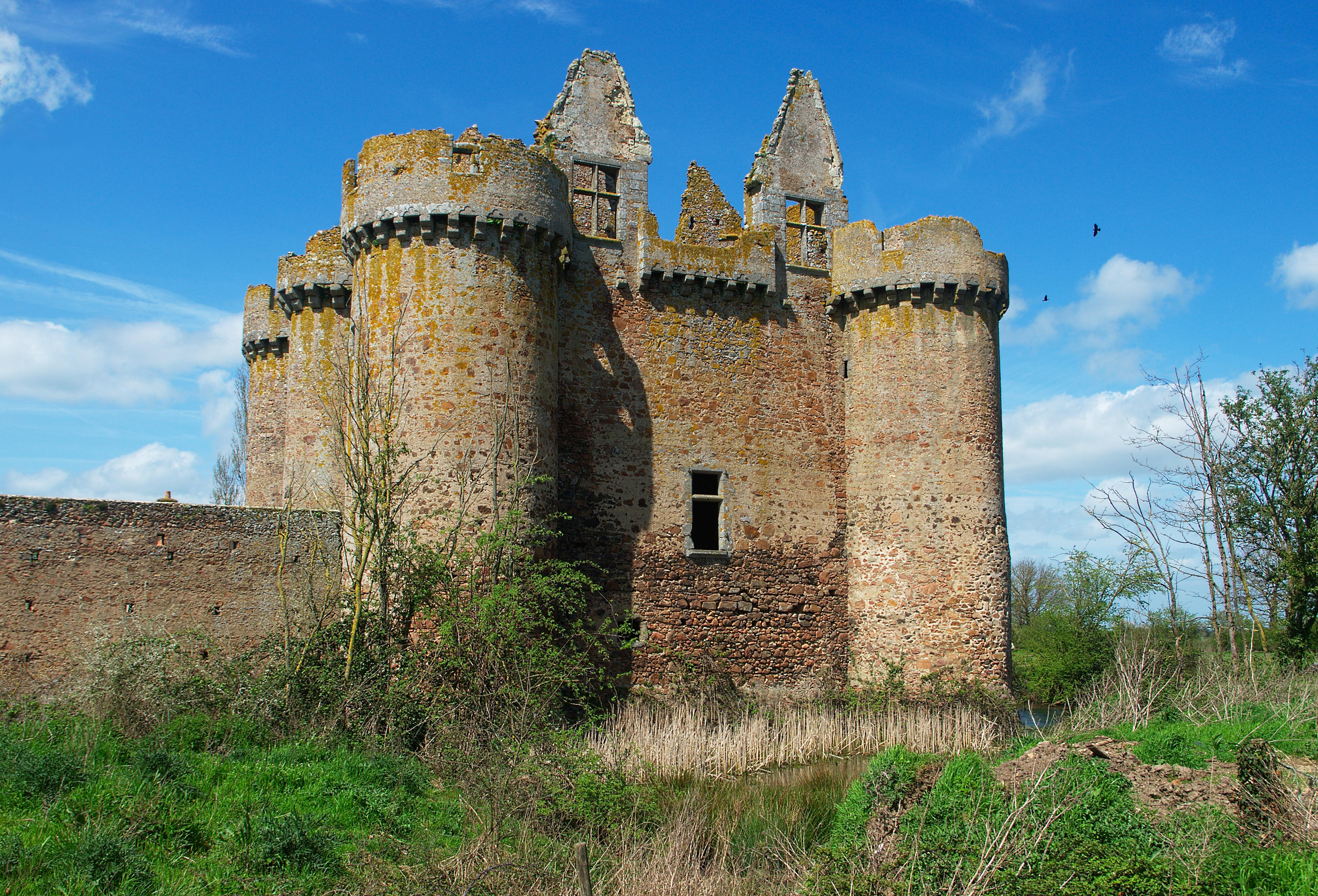
- The Château de l'Ébaupinay
- Location of Le Breuil-sous-Argenton
- Location within France Location within Nouvelle-Aquitaine
- Coordinates: 46°59′36″N 0°25′47″W
- Country: France
- Region: Nouvelle-Aquitaine
- Department: Deux-Sèvres
- Arrondissement: Bressuire
- Canton: Argenton-les-Vallées
- Commune: Argentonnay
- Area^{1}: 19.55 km^{2} (7.55 sq mi)
- Elevation: 117 m (384 ft)
- Highest elevation: 157 m (515 ft)
- Lowest elevation: 67 m (220 ft)
- Population (2022): 439
  - Density: 22.5/km^{2} (58.2/sq mi)
- Time zone: UTC+01:00 (CET)
  - Summer (DST): UTC+02:00 (CEST)
- Postal code: 79150
- ^{1} French Land Register data, which excludes lakes, ponds, glaciers > 1 km^{2} (0.386 sq mi or 247 acres) and river estuaries.

Le Breuil-sous-Argenton (French pronunciation: [lə bʁœj su.z‿aʁʒɑ̃tɔ̃]) is a village and former commune in the Deux-Sèvres department in western France. It is located 18 kilometres (11 mi) northeast of Bressuire. On 1 January 2016, it was merged into the new commune Argentonnay, and became a delegated commune of Argentonnay. It is situated in the northeastern part of the commune.

== Geography ==
The delegated commune of Le Breuil-sous-Argenton has an area of 19.6 km^{2} and 439 inhabitants in 2022. It is located 108 kilometres (67 mi) by road southeast of Nantes, 84 kilometres (52 mi) northeast of Niort and 18 kilometres (11 mi) northeast of Bressuire. The commune bordered the communes of Saint-Aubin-du-Plain, Coulonges-Thouarsais and Genneton. It has an average elevation of 118 metres, and the main river is the Argenton.

== Landmarks ==
The principal church in the village is the Église Notre-Dame.

The late Gothic-style Château de l'Ébaupinay, to the north of the village, dates to the 15th century and was listed as a Historical Monument in 1898. In the 18th century it was damaged following a fire during the French Revolution. Meaning "white thorn", its four towers remain mostly intact and it has a partially filled moat. In 2018, a crowdfunding project organized by startup Dartagnans.fr was started with the objective of restoring the medieval chateau to its former splendour and installing stables, wood and stone workshops, a blacksmith's forge, and a medieval tavern and hostel.

== Notable people ==
- Henri-Victor Miault (1881-1932), sculptor, decorator and carver

== See also ==
- Communes of the Deux-Sèvres department
