= Argenton-les-Vallées =

- Delegated commune of Argentonnay
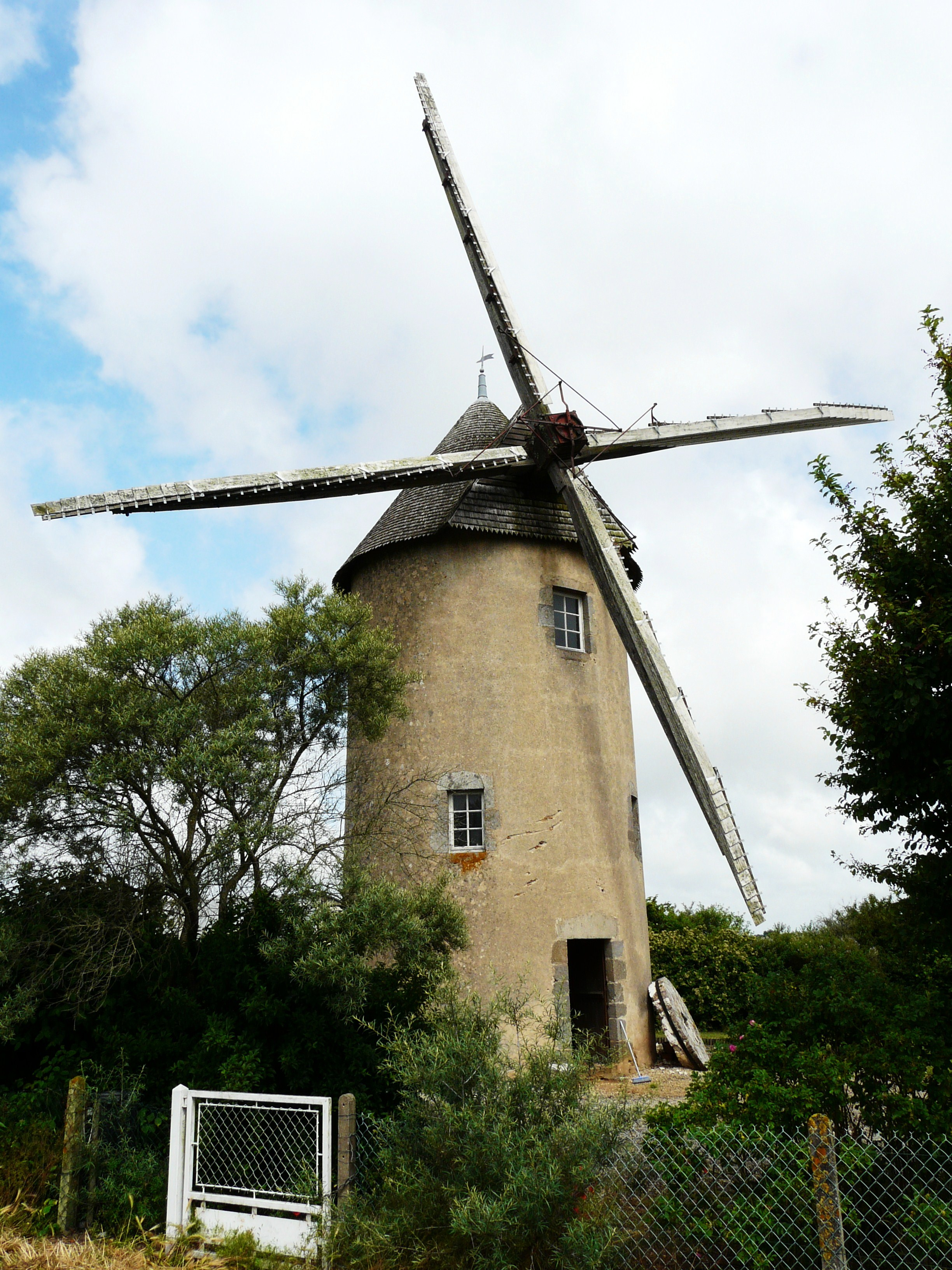
- The windmill in Argenton-les-Vallées

- Coat of arms
- Location of Argenton-les-Vallées
- Location within France Location within Nouvelle-Aquitaine
- Coordinates: 46°59′08″N 0°26′54″W
- Country: France
- Region: Nouvelle-Aquitaine
- Department: Deux-Sèvres
- Arrondissement: Bressuire
- Canton: Argenton-les-Vallées
- Commune: Argentonnay
- Area^{1}: 28.42 km^{2} (10.97 sq mi)
- Highest elevation: 139 m (456 ft)
- Lowest elevation: 70 m (230 ft)
- Population (2022): 1,644
  - Density: 57.85/km^{2} (149.8/sq mi)
- Time zone: UTC+01:00 (CET)
  - Summer (DST): UTC+02:00 (CEST)
- Postal code: 79150
- ^{1} French Land Register data, which excludes lakes, ponds, glaciers > 1 km^{2} (0.386 sq mi or 247 acres) and river estuaries.

Argenton-les-Vallées (French pronunciation: [aʁʒɑ̃tɔ̃ le vale]) is a former commune in the Deux-Sèvres department in western France. On 1 January 2016, it was merged into the new commune Argentonnay, and became a delegated commune of Argentonnay. It is situated in the valley of the River Argenton, from which it takes its name.

It was created on 1 September 2006 from the amalgamation of the communes of Argenton-Château, Boësse and Sanzay.

== See also ==
- Communes of the Deux-Sèvres department
