= Argentonnay =

- Commune
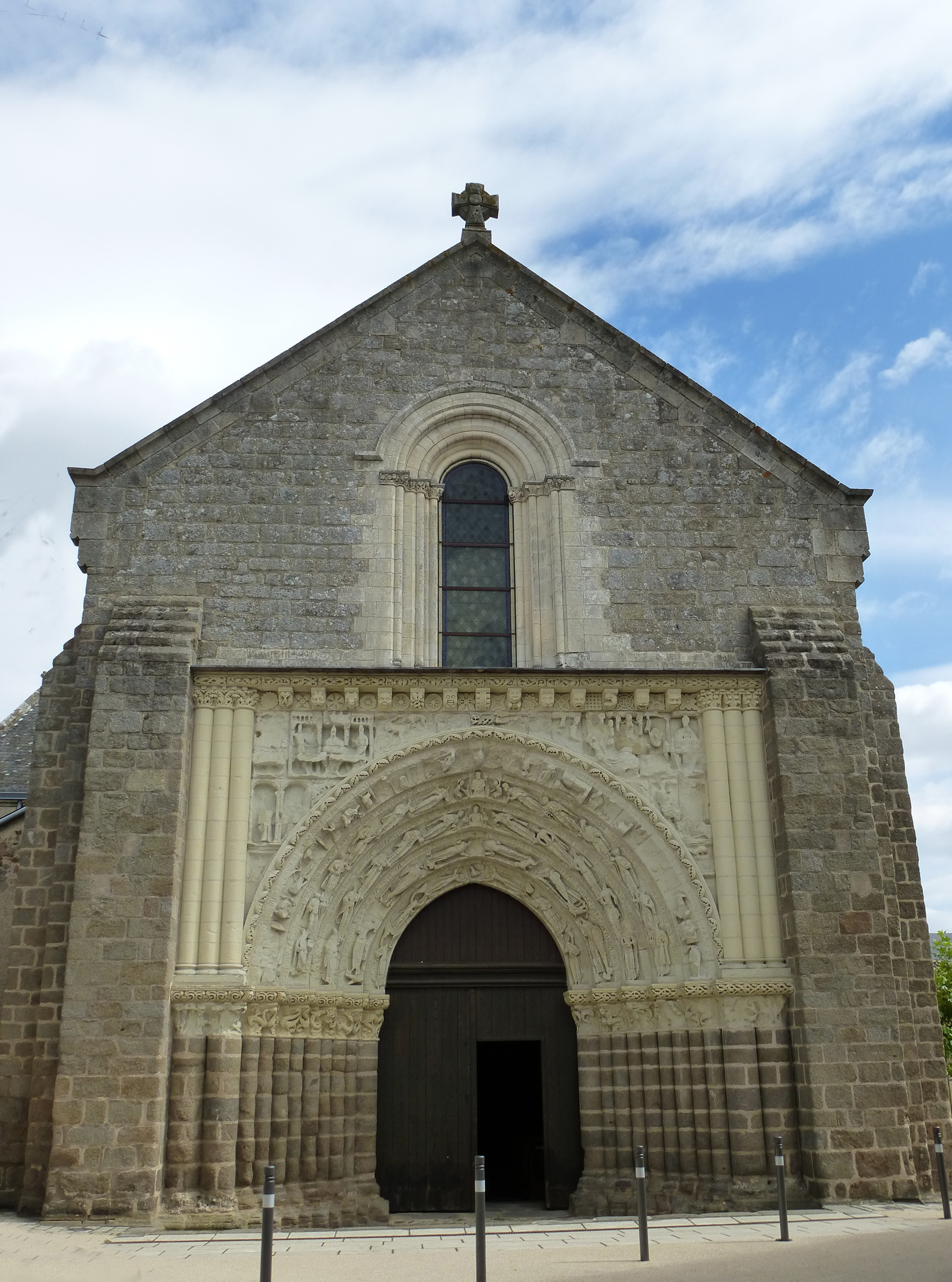
- The church of Saint-Gilles in Argenton-les-Vallées
- Location of Argentonnay
- Location within France Location within Nouvelle-Aquitaine
- Coordinates: 46°59′06″N 0°26′42″W
- Country: France
- Region: Nouvelle-Aquitaine
- Department: Deux-Sèvres
- Arrondissement: Bressuire
- Canton: Mauléon
- Intercommunality: CA Bocage Bressuirais

Government
  - Mayor (2020–2026): Armelle Cassin
- Area^{1}: 117.04 km^{2} (45.19 sq mi)
- Population (2023): 3,234
  - Density: 27.63/km^{2} (71.57/sq mi)
- Time zone: UTC+01:00 (CET)
  - Summer (DST): UTC+02:00 (CEST)
- INSEE/Postal code: 79013 /79150, 79300
- ^{1} French Land Register data, which excludes lakes, ponds, glaciers > 1 km^{2} (0.386 sq mi or 247 acres) and river estuaries.

Argentonnay (French pronunciation: [aʁʒɑ̃tɔnɛ]) is a commune in the Deux-Sèvres department of western France. The municipality was established on 1 January 2016 and consists of the former communes of Argenton-les-Vallées, Le Breuil-sous-Argenton, La Chapelle-Gaudin, La Coudre, Moutiers-sous-Argenton and Ulcot.

== Population ==
Population data refer to the area corresponding with the commune as of January 2025.

Historical population
Year	Pop.	±% p.a.
1968	3,617	—
1975	3,485	−0.53%
1982	3,465	−0.08%
1990	3,411	−0.20%
1999	3,224	−0.62%
2007	3,048	−0.70%
2012	3,251	+1.30%
2017	3,185	−0.41%
2023	3,234	+0.25%
Source: INSEE

== See also ==
- Communes of the Deux-Sèvres department
