= Ulcot =

- Part of Argentonnay
- Location of Ulcot
- Location within France Location within Nouvelle-Aquitaine
- Coordinates: 47°01′39″N 0°23′50″W
- Country: France
- Region: Nouvelle-Aquitaine
- Department: Deux-Sèvres
- Arrondissement: Bressuire
- Canton: Argenton-les-Vallées
- Commune: Argentonnay
- Area^{1}: 6.62 km^{2} (2.56 sq mi)
- Elevation: 123 m (404 ft)
- Highest elevation: 124 m (407 ft)
- Lowest elevation: 101 m (331 ft)
- Population (2022): 55
  - Density: 8.3/km^{2} (22/sq mi)
- Time zone: UTC+01:00 (CET)
  - Summer (DST): UTC+02:00 (CEST)
- Postal code: 79150
- ^{1} French Land Register data, which excludes lakes, ponds, glaciers > 1 km^{2} (0.386 sq mi or 247 acres) and river estuaries.

Ulcot (French pronunciation: [ylko]) is a former commune in the Deux-Sèvres department in western France. On 1 January 2016, it was merged into the new commune Argentonnay.

== See also ==
- Communes of the Deux-Sèvres department
