= Louis Fabien =

French painter

Fabien Louis Pouilloux (18 January 1924 – 1 August 2016), better known by the pseudonym of Louis Fabien, was a French painter.

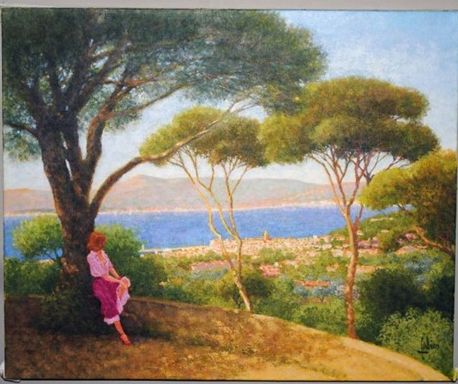

== Early life, family and education ==
Fabien was born in L'Isle-Jourdain in the French département of Vienne in January 1924.

== Career ==
Fabian was a self-taught figurative painter of the School of Paris who used a modern form of pointillism. He painted in a realistic style and tried to capture colourful and charming moments.

He exhibited his work in most of the important Paris salon shows and had one-man shows in many countries including France, the United States, Japan, England, and Germany. He began to show his work in the early 1950s in the Salon d'Automne, and in 1953 exhibited in the Salon de la Jeune Peinture, of which he was elected president in 1964 and in 1965. In 1957 he was accorded the Prix Greenshields.

Fabien's paintings have been acquired by the French State, the City of Paris, and the Petit Palais of Geneva.

== Personal life and demise ==
He died in Cannes in August 2016, at age 92.

== Sources ==
- Dictionnaire des Peintres, Sculpteurs, Dessinateurs et Graveurs, E. Bénézit, Paris
- Biography of Louis Fabien at the Philips Galleries
- Biography of Louis Fabien at the Austin Galleries
