= La Coudre, Deux-Sèvres =

La Coudre
- Part of Argentonnay
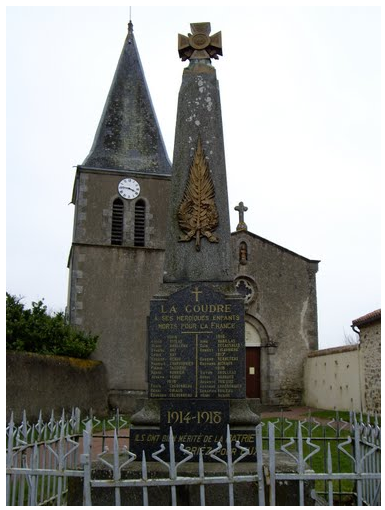
- The church in La Coudre
- Location of La Coudre
- Location within France Location within Nouvelle-Aquitaine
- Coordinates: 46°56′50″N 0°28′10″W
- Country: France
- Region: Nouvelle-Aquitaine
- Department: Deux-Sèvres
- Arrondissement: Bressuire
- Canton: Argenton-les-Vallées
- Commune: Argentonnay
- Area^{1}: 8.40 km^{2} (3.24 sq mi)
- Elevation: 130 m (430 ft)
- Highest elevation: 155 m (509 ft)
- Lowest elevation: 88 m (289 ft)
- Population (2022): 217
  - Density: 25.8/km^{2} (66.9/sq mi)
- Time zone: UTC+01:00 (CET)
  - Summer (DST): UTC+02:00 (CEST)
- Postal code: 79150
- ^{1} French Land Register data, which excludes lakes, ponds, glaciers > 1 km^{2} (0.386 sq mi or 247 acres) and river estuaries.

La Coudre (French pronunciation: [la kudʁ]) is a former commune in the Deux-Sèvres department in western France. On 1 January 2016, it was merged into the new commune Argentonnay.

== See also ==
- Communes of the Deux-Sèvres department
