= Moutiers-sous-Argenton =

- Part of Argentonnay
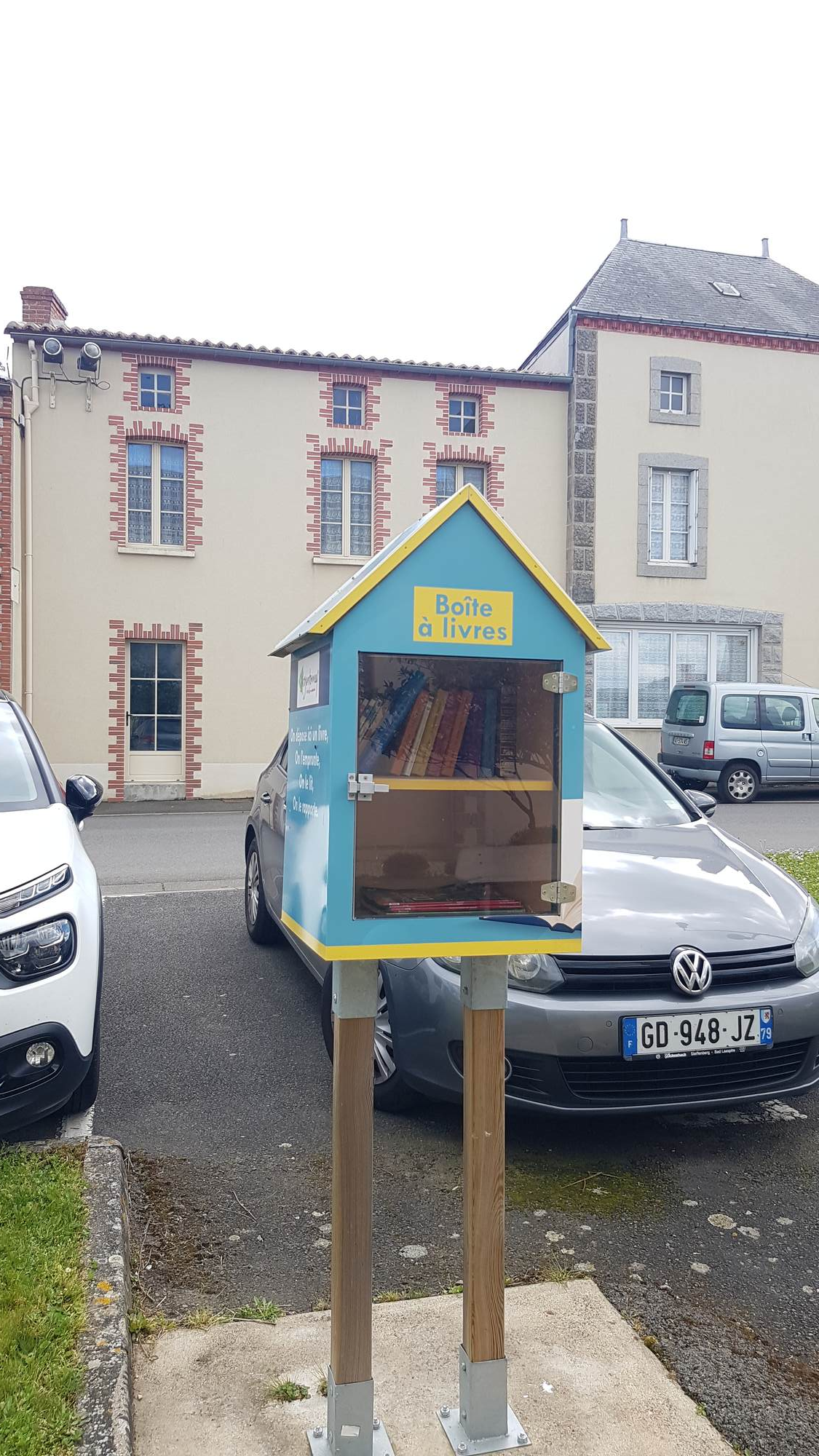
- Moutiers-sous-Argenton Town hall
- Location of Moutiers-sous-Argenton
- Location within France Location within Nouvelle-Aquitaine
- Coordinates: 46°57′15″N 0°23′30″W
- Country: France
- Region: Nouvelle-Aquitaine
- Department: Deux-Sèvres
- Arrondissement: Bressuire
- Canton: Argenton-les-Vallées
- Commune: Argentonnay
- Area^{1}: 36.4 km^{2} (14.1 sq mi)
- Elevation: 181 m (594 ft)
- Highest elevation: 158 m (518 ft)
- Lowest elevation: 68 m (223 ft)
- Population (2022): 631
  - Density: 17.3/km^{2} (44.9/sq mi)
- Time zone: UTC+01:00 (CET)
  - Summer (DST): UTC+02:00 (CEST)
- Postal code: 79150
- ^{1} French Land Register data, which excludes lakes, ponds, glaciers > 1 km^{2} (0.386 sq mi or 247 acres) and river estuaries.

Moutiers-sous-Argenton (French pronunciation: [mutje su.z‿aʁʒɑ̃tɔ̃]) is a former commune in the Deux-Sèvres department in western France. On 1 January 2016, it was merged into the new commune Argentonnay.

== See also ==
- Communes of the Deux-Sèvres department
