= La Coudre, Vaud =

Swiss village in Vaud

Coordinates: 46°38′20.18″N 6°24′10.53″E

La Coudre is a village in the canton of Vaud, Switzerland. It is part of the municipality of L'Isle.
