= L'Isle-Jourdain, Vienne =

L'Isle-Jourdain
- Commune
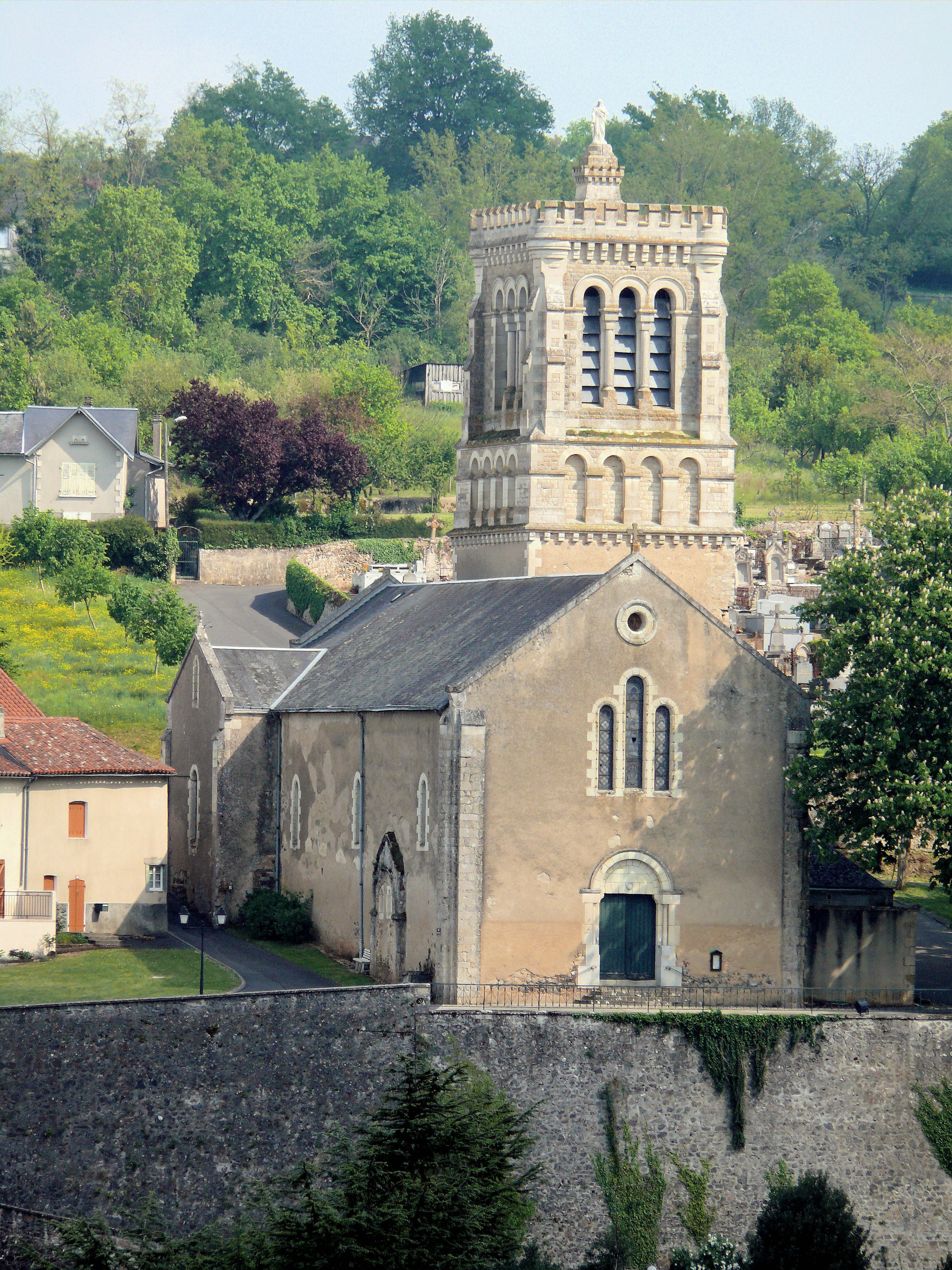
- The church of Saint-Gervais and Saint-Protais, in L'Isle-Jourdain

- Coat of arms
- Location of L'Isle-Jourdain
- Location within France Location within Nouvelle-Aquitaine
- Coordinates: 46°13′59″N 0°41′12″E
- Country: France
- Region: Nouvelle-Aquitaine
- Department: Vienne
- Arrondissement: Montmorillon
- Canton: Lussac-les-Châteaux

Government
  - Mayor (2023–2026): Jean-Pierre Melon
- Area^{1}: 5.92 km^{2} (2.29 sq mi)
- Elevation: 135 m (443 ft)
- Highest elevation: 183 m (600 ft)
- Lowest elevation: 87 m (285 ft)
- Population (2023): 1,126
  - Density: 190/km^{2} (493/sq mi)
- Time zone: UTC+01:00 (CET)
  - Summer (DST): UTC+02:00 (CEST)
- INSEE/Postal code: 86112 /86150
- ^{1} French Land Register data, which excludes lakes, ponds, glaciers > 1 km^{2} (0.386 sq mi or 247 acres) and river estuaries.

L'Isle-Jourdain (French pronunciation: [lil ʒuʁdɛ̃]) is a commune in the Vienne department in the Nouvelle-Aquitaine region in western France.

== Notable residents ==
- Louis Fabien (1924–2016), pseudonym of a French painter who used a modern form of pointillism

== See also ==
- Communes of the Vienne department
- Church of Saint-Paixent
