= Moutier-d'Ahun =

Commune in Nouvelle-Aquitaine, France

Moutier-d’Ahun
- Commune
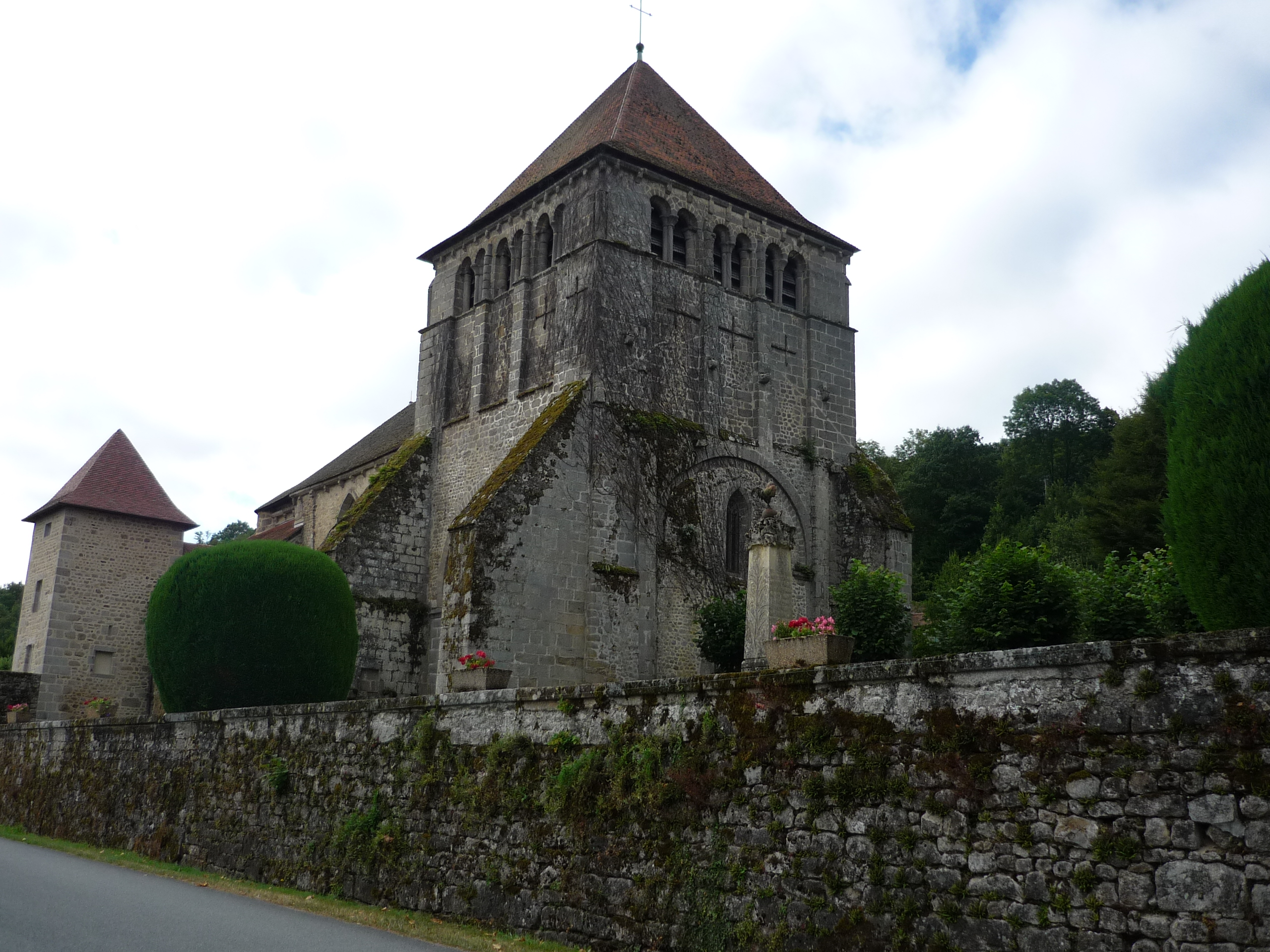
- Abbey
- Location of Moutier-d’Ahun
- Location within France Location within Nouvelle-Aquitaine
- Coordinates: 46°05′33″N 2°03′20″E
- Country: France
- Region: Nouvelle-Aquitaine
- Department: Creuse
- Arrondissement: Guéret
- Canton: Ahun
- Intercommunality: CC Creuse Sud Ouest

Government
  - Mayor (2023–2026): Guy Cathelot
- Area^{1}: 9.91 km^{2} (3.83 sq mi)
- Elevation: 362 m (1,188 ft)
- Highest elevation: 456 m (1,496 ft)
- Lowest elevation: 340 m (1,120 ft)
- Population (2023): 160
  - Density: 16/km^{2} (42/sq mi)
- Time zone: UTC+01:00 (CET)
  - Summer (DST): UTC+02:00 (CEST)
- INSEE/Postal code: 23138 /23150
- ^{1} French Land Register data, which excludes lakes, ponds, glaciers > 1 km^{2} (0.386 sq mi or 247 acres) and river estuaries.

Moutier-d’Ahun (French pronunciation: [mutje da.œ̃], literally Moutier of Ahun; Occitan: Mostier d'Aiun) is a commune in the Creuse department in the Nouvelle-Aquitaine region in central France.

== Geography ==
A farming area comprising the village and a couple of hamlets situated some 11 miles (18 km) southeast of Guéret at the junction of the D16, D13 and the D942 roads. The river Creuse flows through the middle of the village.

== Population ==
Historical population
Year	Pop.	±% p.a.
1968	274	—
1975	244	−1.64%
1982	234	−0.60%
1990	195	−2.25%
1999	193	−0.11%
2007	173	−1.36%
2012	154	−2.30%
2017	184	+3.62%
2023	160	−2.30%
Source: INSEE

== Sights ==
- The church, once part of a monastery, dating from the fourteenth century.
- A medieval stone bridge.

== See also ==
- Communes of the Creuse department
