= Vaincre ou mourir =

2023 film by Paul Mignot and Vincent Mottez

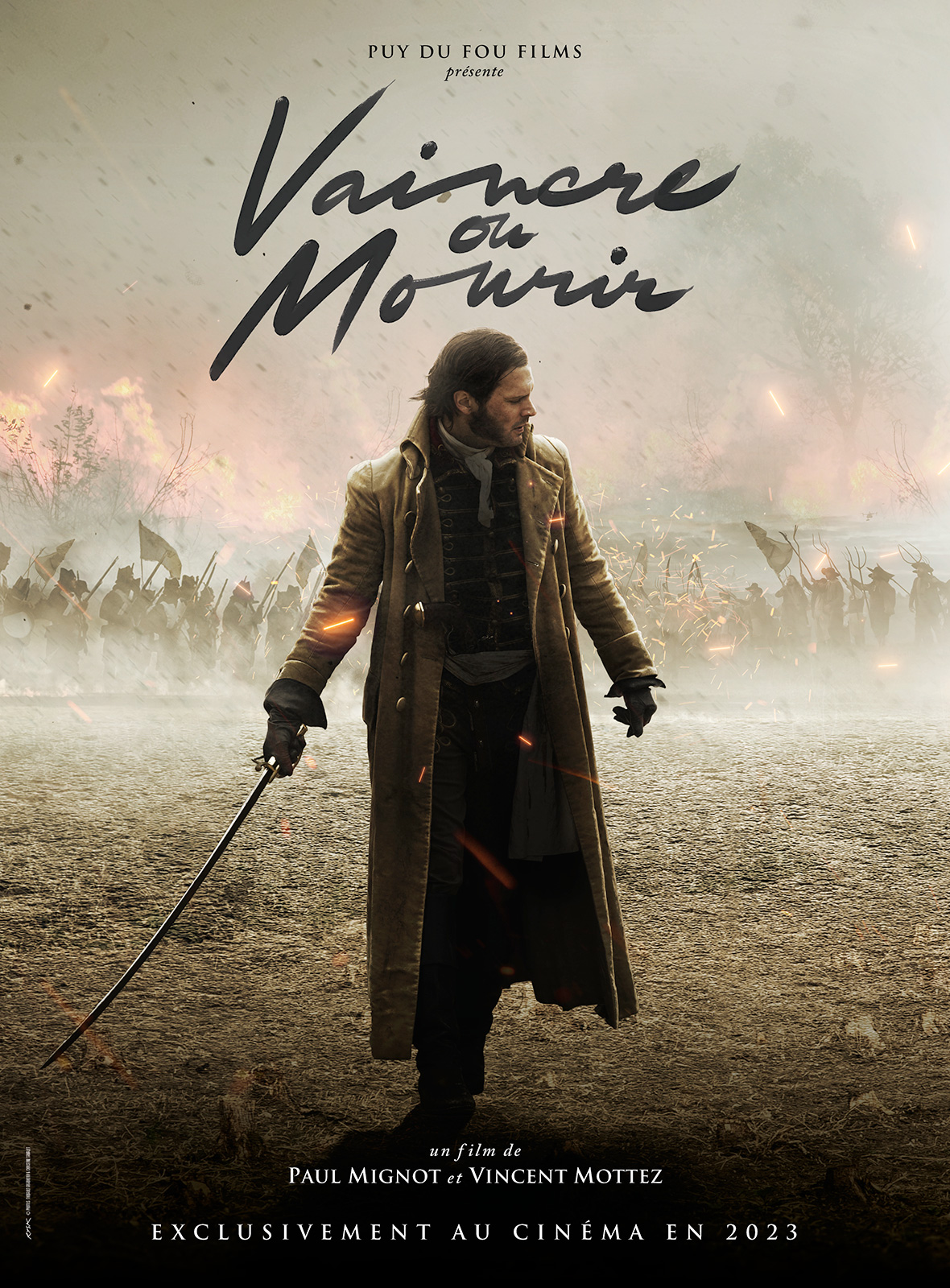
- Theatrical release poster
- Directed by: Paul Mignot Vincent Mottez
- Produced by: Puy du Fou Films Studiocanal
- Starring: Hugo Becker Jean-Hugues Anglade Rod Paradot Constance Gay Francis Renaud Grégory Fitoussi Anne Serra
- Music by: Nathan Stornetta
- Release date: 2023
- Country: France

Vaincre ou mourir (lit. 'Vanquish or Die') is a French film co-directed by Paul Mignot and Vincent Mottez, produced by Puy du Fou Films and StudioCanal, released in 2023. The feature focuses on the War in the Vendée through the prism of Vendée general François Athanase Charette de La Contrie.

The film was mostly poorly received by the press but audience reviews gave the film high praise. The film attracted approximately 300,000 spectators in nine weeks. Historians specializing in the French Revolution note few factual errors but point out that while the film does not repeat counter-revolutionary propaganda, it facilitates the narratives of such organizations.

== Synopsis ==
In revolutionary France, in 1793, after three years of tranquility at the Château de Fonteclose, where he settled after his marriage, François Athanase Charette de La Contrie is called by angry peasants to take command of the Vendée insurrection.

The young sailor becomes a skillful strategist and charismatic war leader, defying the Republic with his army of peasants, women, and children.

== Technical details ==
- Original title: Vaincre ou mourir
- Directed by Paul Mignot, Vincent Mottez
- Screenplay: Vincent Mottez based on the Puy du Fou show Le Dernier Panache
- Music: Nathan Stornetta
- Sets by Audrey Malecot, Irène Marinari
- Costumes: Les Vertugadins
- Photography: Alexandre Jamin
- Editing: Tao Delport
- Producers: Guillaume Allaire, Hubert De Filippo, Nicolas de Villiers
- Production company: Puy du Fou Films, StudioCanal
- Distributor: Saje distribution
- Genre: historical, action, adventure
- Country of production: France
- Original language: French
- Running time: 100 minutes
- Release dates:
  - France: January 25, 2023
- Classification:
  - France: General public when released in cinemas and not recommended for under-10s on television.

== Distribution ==
- Hugo Becker: François Athanase Charette de La Contrie
- Rod Paradot: François Prudent Hervouët de La Robrie
- Gilles Cohen: Jean-Baptiste de Couëtus
- Grégory Fitoussi: Jean-Pierre Travot
- Constance Gay: Céleste Bulkeley
- Dorcas Coppin: Marie Adélaïde de La Touche Limouzinière de La Rochefoucauld
- Jonathan Demurger: Nicolas Haxo
- Francis Renaud: Jacques-Louis Maupillier
- Damien Jouillerot: Louis Lecouvreur
- Olivier Barthélémy: Pfeiffer
- Anne Serra: Marie-Anne Charette de La Contrie
- Jacques Milazzo: Abbé Remaud
- Jean-Hugues Anglade: Albert Ruelle
- Léon Durieux: Louis XVII
- Avant Strangel: Thomas Alexandre Dumas

== Production ==
=== Genesis ===
In March 2022, the Parc du Puy du Fou announced plans to produce a feature-length film through its subsidiary Puy du Fou Films. The project is presented as a historically inspired documentary. This first film focuses on François-Athanase Charette de La Contrie, a major figure in the Vendée War. The project follows on from Le Dernier Panache, created in the Vendée park and voted Best World Creation by the Themed Entertainment Association in 2016. The Pays de la Loire region is contributing €200,000 to the production of Vaincre ou mourir, which requires less than five million euros.

=== Development ===
Several historians and specialists were consulted by the filmmakers, without taking part in writing the script: Jean-Clément Martin, Anne Rolland-Boulestreau, Reynald Secher, Nicolas Delahaye, and Anne Bernet. However, Jean-Clément Martin later asked for his involvement to be withdrawn. In December 2022, director Vincent Mottez commented: “It's true that the project, originally presented as a docu-drama, evolved into a feature film as the project progressed. I fully understand that Jean-Clément Martin, seeing the basic contract modified, made this request. However, we remain on very good terms“.

=== Filming ===
Filming began in March 2022, in and around the Parc du Puy du Fou.

=== Post-production ===
The film's theatrical distribution is handled by Studiocanal, a member of the Vivendi group then owned by Vincent Bolloré, and by Saje. Saje produces films aimed at a Christian audience interested in “everything to do with faith”, in the tradition of American confessional cinema, in the words of Hubert de Torcy, CEO of Saje.

== Home ==
=== Release and promotion ===
The film was released in France on January 25, 2023. Prior to this, previews were held in several French cities on December 8, 2022.

The film was scheduled for release in Spain on September 15, 2023.

=== Critical reception ===
In France, review aggregator Allociné shows an average of 1.3/5 based on 10 press titles. Audience reviews gave the film an average of 4 out of 5, but after an analysis by Libération, their representativeness was called into question by marketing specialists. A year later, audience reviews gave the film an average of 3.6 out of 5.

==== Positive reviews ====
The film received positive reviews, mainly from the conservative press: the traditionalist Catholic monthly La Nef wrote: “the producers have given us a grand spectacle of a film, with excellent actors who are its strong point”. Journalist François Maximin concludes: “The spirit of the film is remarkable, and follows historical reality as closely as possible. In terms of resources, there's nothing ridiculous about the staging, even if it's far from the big Hollywood productions: the image is beautiful, the scenes well shot. All of this is positive, and yet, as we leave the screening, we can't help but feel that something is missing, that we're missing the epic dimension of such a story“.

On Claves, the Christian education website of the Fraternité Saint-Pierre, Abbé Paul Roy sees Vaincre ou mourir as “a beautiful film that brings to life all the paradoxical horror of those forgotten times in our history”. For him, the film remains “discreet about Charette's Christian life, and does not claim to canonize his hero, but shows him fighting for God and the king in a Christian atmosphere. The abbé's presence is constant at his side, even if the character can sometimes seem a little fallible (and unshaven): from the first magnificent images of mass in the woods to the final absolution given to the condemned man on the way to the firing squad”. He asserts that “the great quality of the production, which reflects the expertise of the Puy du Fou, certainly lies in the fine spirit with which the epic of this Vendéen hero is retold, in the beauty of the images, costumes, scenes in general and the music that accompanies them, and in the richness and historical and literary depth of the text that forms the overall framework”.

The Zickma website focuses on the form and the actors: it praises “a formidable Rod Paradot who continues to prove his talent ”as well as“ the beautiful sets, the meticulous staging (despite a few clumsinesses), the beautiful costumes, not forgetting the lovely soundtrack, albeit a little too present”. The reviewer concludes that Vaincre ou mourir “brings a breath of fresh air to French cinema [which] does a lot of good”.

==== Negative opinions ====
Paul Quinio of Libération sees this production as “yet another example of the ongoing conservative offensive, which uses soft power to spread ideas without appearing to do so”. For the journalist, the film is part of “a cultural and ideological battle [...] that is far from over”. He sees in the proposed depiction of the confrontation between “royalists and republicans” during the War in the Vendée “good royalists” against “evil republicans”. Interviewed by Libération, historian Guillaume Lancereau criticized the scriptwriters for “getting a reactionary, Manichean vision” of the events into the heads of as many people as possible. His colleague Elisabeth Franck-Dumas agrees: “What's most fascinating about a militant film that has turned its characters into alibis is the prominence given to concepts, to those headless, abstract, visibly evil entities against which Charette and his friends fight relentlessly. Their names are republic or history. [...] Reversing history, a good definition of the reactionary enterprise“. Albane Guichard of Le HuffPost criticizes the film's use of an interview with “the controversial Reynald Secher, who supports the thesis of a Vendéen ‘genocide’ in his books”, and its ambiguous language: “from the outset, the line between documentary and fiction is blurred”, a “strategy already used in the Park's shows”.

Télérama's Samuel Douhaire headlines “Vaincre ou mourir, un film du Puy du Fou si mauvais que même les royalistes détesteront” (Conquer or die, a Puy du Fou film so bad even royalists will hate it), claiming that the War in the Vendée is “told with Chouan glasses and big clogs”.

In L'Obs, Xavier Leherpeur immediately places the film in his “Raté de la semaine” box: “To the question posed by the title, the answer is clear: die rather than ever see this historical nonsense again". The columnist regrets that the means are “powerless to save the film from its scripted muddle” and finds the direction “inert, relying on an abusive use of drone and low-angle shots to reinforce the Christ-like dimension of the central character”. He concludes: “very little cinema, a lot of noise and proselytizing fury, all sprinkled with a heavy-handed Christian message”.

Murielle Joudet of Le Monde also describes the film as “a historical nonsense”, characterized by “an audiovisual mush that reels off all the hackneyed clichés of the historical film, stirring up its Christian and virilist imagery with visual effects from another age”.

According to Le Parisien, “despite some rather successful action scenes, Vaincre ou mourir struggles to convince, both in form and content”.

Journalist Olivier Delcroix of Le Figaro writes: “If Charette's epic (played by Hugo Becker, who does what he can) deserves to be retold, this is not the way to do it. [...] It's violent, bloody, noisy, aggressive. One sighs at the mere idea of a film that could have been made by Philippe de Broca“.

Sylvestre Picard of Première asks: “Is Vaincre ou mourir at least a great spectacular film? Not really. Above all, it's riddled with ellipses, with the voice-over filling in the gaps in a straitjacketed narrative, stuck in its reductive vision of the world - even if this vision advances masked”. He adds that the feature film is “distributed by Saje, which specializes in Christian films (such as the sinister anti-abortion drama Unplanned in 2019), co-produced by Canal+, owned by the very Catholic Vincent Bolloré”. The journalist points out that the prologue is signed by “historians including the very oriented Reynald Secher, supporter of the controversial Vendée genocide thesis”.

On the Écran large website, Antoine Desrues declares that “the production by Puy du Fou Films assumes the role of a royalist and fundamentalist Catholic tract”, “in which the Republic is perceived as the political system that has, little by little, led to the downfall of our Christian values”. The journalist considers that Charette is presented as “an icon whose actions and ideological stance have never been called into question”. He also compares Vaincre ou mourir to an overtly evangelist strand of Hollywood cinema (Dieu n'est pas mort or Unplanned) that has become “a business in its own right”. Antoine Desrues castigates the underlying message of the film: the “civilizational battle of Vincent Bolloré, who exploits the seventh art as a propaganda tool similar to Touche pas à mon poste. Welcome to 2023, and to the return of total obscurantism, which no longer even bothers to provide itself with an attractive case to mask its mephitic odor”. His colleague Mathieu Jaborska backs up his comments: “Crude royalist exaltation would almost pass for a tolerable position if the pseudo-documentary approach didn't take us for suggestible morons”.

Télé 2 semaines wrote: “while it has the merit of shedding light on a little-known hero, this historical fresco suffers from a predictable script and sloppy direction, particularly in the battle scenes”.

=== Box office ===
At its first afternoon screening in Paris, Vaincre ou mourir failed to reach the top three: Tár ranked first among films released on January 25, 2023, followed by The Asadas and Return to Seoul. On its first day of release, the film achieves a total of 32,371 admissions, including 25,991 in previews, for a total of 489 proposed screenings on 188 copies, including seven in Paris. On the day of its release, Vaincre ou mourir attracted an average of 34 spectators per screen. According to Jérôme Vermelin on TF1 Info, “it didn't really fill theaters”.

Taking previews into account, the film came second in the box-office for new releases in France on its first day, behind Pattie et la Colère de Poséidon (101,484) and ahead of Mayday (18,013). Excluding previews, the film ranks fifth at the box office with 6,380 admissions, behind Divertimento (7,580) and ahead of Un petit miracle (6,267).

At the end of its first week, the film had sold 107,762 tickets, placing it seventh at the weekly box office, behind Puss in Boots: The Last Wish (116,750) and ahead of Tár (98,969).

After its second week of release, Vaincre ou mourir achieved a further 73,394 admissions, still between Le Chat potté 2 (87,053) and Tár (72,394). The film now tops the 200,000 mark. In week 3, Vaincre ou mourir exited the weekly box-office top 10 in fourteenth place, with an additional 51,790 admissions.

At the time of its release, the hoped-for 100,000 admissions seemed out of reach. The far-right press believed that the controversies and historical analyses relayed by the press had led to a Streisand effect, attracting audiences.

| Country or region | Box-office | Box-office closing date | Number of weeks |
|---|---|---|---|
| France | 287 609 entries, 2 107 350 $ | 29 March 2023 | 9 |

=== Controversies ===
==== Suspicion of fake reviews on Allociné ====
On February 13, 2023, Allociné, the review aggregator site, received generally favorable reviews from viewers, with an average of 4 out of 5. A survey published in the daily newspaper Libération on February 11 questions the unusual number of reviews, many of which come from accounts created only recently and which have not posted any other reviews. The flood of reviews also arouses suspicion because of their speed: on the day of the film's release, by 7 a.m., the film's page on Allociné was already flooded with several hundred favorable reviews. Two online marketing specialists interviewed concluded that there was a probable attempt to influence the rating of the film's viewer reviews on Allociné by means of fake reviews, as had happened in the past with other films such as Arthur Benzaquen's Les Nouvelles Aventures d'Aladin in 2015.

A year later, audience reviews give the film an average rating of 3.6 out of 5.

==== Political reactions ====
MPs Alexis Corbière and Matthias Tavel, both members of the political party La France insoumise, denounced an “anti-republican fiction” and a “falsification of history”, believing that the “extreme rightists want to impose on society their own reading of the problems of our time, their hatred of republican equality, their morbid nostalgia for fundamentalist Catholic pseudo-traditions, their nationalism ‘of the earth and the dead’”.

== Analysis ==
=== Analysis by Jean-Clément Martin ===
Vaincre ou mourir is defined as a historical film, and follows on from Dernier Panache, a show at the Puy du Fou theme park presented as “inspired by real events”. Both the theme park and the show have long been the subject of concern and criticism from historians who accuse them of subjugating historical reality to a conservative political vision. This is particularly true of Jean-Clément Martin, a specialist in the French Revolution, the Counter-Revolution and the War in the Vendée. In 2019, however, he indicated that he has proposed “an analysis of the evolution of the memory of the Vendée wars covering the last two centuries up to 2018, to insist on the extraordinary concentration of memories of the war operated by the Puy du Fou and nearby institutions, making the regional memory mutate towards a use that is more touristic than militant”.

Commenting on the film, historian Jean-Clément Martin considers that “there are no notable factual errors that shock, except for one: Charette's signing of the peace treaty of February 17, 1795, which didn't happen! Only the revolutionaries signed“.

In his opinion, the film deals fairly with the participation of women in combat - with the characters of the Amazons Bulkeley and La Rochefoucauld -, the links between the Vendéens and the Chouans and émigrés, and the distance taken by the clergy at the time of the pacification of 1795-1796. On the subject of the massacres committed by the infernal columns, he believes that “overall, the presentation of the devastation corresponds to what is happening. [...] The representation of the repression was inevitable and, it must be said, could have been even more terrible“.

On the other hand, Jean-Clément Martin considers the battle scenes unconvincing, pointing out that Charette did not switch to guerrilla warfare until 1794. He also criticizes the costumes and sets: “The Republicans don't all wear unique uniforms, are better armed and much more numerous. The Vendéens are not just peasants and nobles; there is greater social diversity. [...] The urban décor hardly corresponds to the architecture of Western villages and towns. [...] Life in the area controlled by Charette, or by other forgotten leaders like Stofflet in 1794, is organized: crops are harvested, people are cared for in country hospitals, and even money is minted! The presentation of an almost medieval life is obviously highly romantic and false“. He also regrets that the film does not highlight the divisions between Republicans.

The film takes up “the idea that the Peace of La Jaunaye in February 1795 was accompanied by the delivery of Louis XVII to Charette for installation in the heart of the Vendée”. This version “has been known for two centuries, but no one can say whether it is authentic”.

Jean-Clément Martin believes that the fact that the film “is devoted solely to Charette is technically understandable, but raises questions. Charette arrived late in the war, and only established himself after the summer of 1793. [...] It was only after 1794 that he became a recognized war leader, but his allies and rivals, starting with Stofflet, had to be associated with him. [...] The personalization of war distorts perspectives. [...] The exclusive concentration on Charette is an aesthetic choice, which is understandable, but it does not allow a global view of the war and masks the complexity of the period“.

Jean-Clément Martin subsequently wrote on his Mediapart blog. He criticizes the film for “its useless introduction, its elliptical fiction, its omissions, notably of the complexity of the Vendean armies or, worse still, of the massacres at Machecoul committed by the Vendeans before Charette took the lead”, and points out that Charette never signed the 1795 peace treaty. On the other hand, he criticizes certain aspects of the film, pointing out that the “scenes of fire and devastation” depict historically attested violence. On the whole, he believes that “the word ‘genocide’ is not the subtext of this film”, whose purpose is therefore, in his view, quite distinct from those of Philippe de Villiers, the owner of the Puy du Fou, whose comments Martin deems “highly questionable and deliberately polemical”. He concludes: “Just because important people make highly questionable and deliberately polemical comments, that doesn't mean we should imitate them and enter into stupid debates. We need to get back to the facts, to remember that the War in the Vendée was born of a disastrous rivalry between revolutionaries, and that as long as the Republic does not simply admit this reality - which the Republicans of 1880 knew and denounced - we will always have this festering wound, obviously scratched by those who side with the victims, the fashionable position”. While acknowledging that the film was “produced by groups hostile to the Revolution, even to the Republic, certainly to democracy”, he invites supporters of these three notions to propose other accounts of the period themselves. He cites Turenne and Costelle's TV film La Bataille de Cholet, made in 1974, as an example of successful screen treatment of the period.

=== Analysis by Paul Chopelin and François Huzar ===
In an article published in September 2023 in Annales historiques de la Révolution française, historians Paul Chopelin and François Huzar describe the film as “very demonstrative, with an omnipresent voice-over that presents the historical context and very awkwardly relates the characters' feelings”. What's immediately striking, they say, is how little attention is paid to the religious crisis”. The filmmakers put more emphasis on “the political stakes”, in particular the mass uprising as the driving force behind the revolt, but they “didn't want to make a militant Christian film”, which contrasts with the Saje distribution catalogue.

They also point out that “Charette is not hero-ized according to the classic canons of counter-revolutionary literature. Instead, he is portrayed as a procrastinator, even a failure, who enters the war in spite of himself, and whose charisma gradually reveals itself in the course of the fighting. Constantly hesitant, sometimes sinking into violence himself, he allows himself to be led by events rather than influencing them”.

Paul Chopelin and François Huzar note that Reynald Secher speaks last in the introduction, “which gives him an authoritative status”. However, they consider that “the film is far from espousing his theses on the Vendée wars. At no point is the word genocide uttered”. Nevertheless, they regret that “the filmmakers give credence to the idea of a repression entirely organized from outside”, without giving any place to local antagonisms.

In their view, the second part of the film, devoted to pacification and inspired by the work of historian Anne Rolland-Boulestreau, is “the most nuanced and innovative treatment of the Vendée Wars in cinema”. The film distinguishes “in the Republican camp, the criminals from the men of honor”, and in particular highlights Republican general Jean-Pierre Travot, who appears “as the hero's double, bearing the same fighting ethic, respectful of the adversary and the law of nations”. As for the Bourbons, they were not presented to their advantage, and the monarchical cause ultimately proved disappointing in Charette's eyes.

For Paul Chopelin and François Huzar: “We have to recognize that the political message is ultimately neither anti-republican nor counter-revolutionary. The Revolution, accepted at the outset, is not inherently evil. [...] Vincent Mottez takes up the very classic thesis that the “Terror” went off the rails, and ultimately calls for a reconciliation between adversaries”. From this point of view, they consider that “film critics who describe Vaincre ou mourir as a propaganda film, like Samuel Douhaire in Télérama [...] are, to say the least, acting in bad faith”.

In their view, “in the end, it's more the context of the film's release that transforms it into a militant film, on the right as a symbol of a counter-offensive against a supposedly official history imposed by the left, on the left as an emblem of the cultural ambitions of an identitarian Catholic right embodied by Philippe de Villiers and Vincent Bolloré”.

=== Analysis by Guillaume Lancereau ===
Historian Guillaume Lancereau believes that, although the film does not explicitly take up the thesis of a “Vendéen genocide”, Vaincre ou mourir does take up the idea “in filigree”, firstly because the film opens with an interview with Reynald Secher, who invented the thesis, and secondly because the film retains the idea that the revolutionary state deliberately sought to eradicate the Vendéens. But this idea is “historically untenable”, says Lancereau, because at the time the film takes place “there was no ethnic dimension to the Vendée, and therefore no Vendéen identity. It was built afterwards, in the memory of the Vendée War. And there was no will on the part of the State, but rather a powerlessness to control the exactions committed by the soldiers. So it wasn't due to an excess of State power!” The film's reactionary intent is also evident in its lack of context, and the abrupt ellipsis in the course of the film: ‘We make a monstrous historical leap between 1789 and 1793, a period that includes some of the richest and densest days in French history, in favor of a shift, as if the Terror was already contained in 1789, which is a particularly reactionary historiographical thesis ’.

Lancereau declares that, like the show, “the film carries an anti-republican, Catholic and royalist vision”, and is alarmed by the producers' “pedagogical” pretensions. He warns: “The problem with showing such a film to an uninformed public is that there are no pedagogical contextual elements, and no way of proposing a critical counter-discourse. At the Puy du Fou, there are booklets aimed at schoolchildren that contain objective errors.”

=== Analysis by Pierre Vermeren ===
For Pierre Vermeren, professor of contemporary history at the University of Paris 1 Panthéon-Sorbonne and specialist in the Maghreb, the film's poor critical reception can be explained by the taboo of the Vendée War: “the film [...] throws part of the national novel into the fire by recreating, with varying degrees of cinematic success - but that's not the point - one of the most tragic episodes - if not the most tragic - in our Franco-French history: the War in the Vendée and its 200,000 dead. It's in order to unveil this hidden phase of our national history, its cursed page, that [many historians] dedicate this film to the gémonies”. In his view, the public (especially those on the left) would have difficulty with the subject of the Vendée War, because it took place during a delicate period of the “Great Revolution” (execution of Louis XVI, the Terror), even though the French nation and the Republic were partly built on these periods. In fact, he continues, “it fascinates us [the Great Revolution], and we try to conceal its mass crimes”.

=== Analysis by Thierry Lentz ===
Historian Thierry Lentz, then associate professor at the Institut Catholique de Vendée, wrote in Le Figaro: “If the film, due to a lack of resources, is not free of aesthetic criticism, and if the choice to open with contemporary interventions makes the whole thing a little unusual, we don't see why its theses - which are, moreover, acceptable for a historian - should have less right to be cited than those of other film productions. We should even be delighted that, at last, French cinema is dealing with a subject like this, if only to continue the discussion on the terrible and not so glamorous wars and exactions of the Vendée. But the ZAD de la Terreur, knowing its historically weak position, will never want to hear about it. That's the only thing that's certain”.

== See also ==
- List of films set during the French Revolution and French Revolutionary Wars

== Bibliography ==
- Chopelin, Paul; Huzar, François (2023). "Le Puy du Fou sur pellicule. Usages de l'histoire et mobilisations militantes autour du film Vaincre ou mourir (janvier-février 2023)" [Le Puy du Fou on film. Uses of history and militant mobilization around the film Vaincre ou mourir (January-February 2023)]. Annales historiques de la Révolution française (in French). 413 (3): 179–193. doi:10.3917/ahrf.413.0179.
- Pastorello, Thierry (2023). "Vaincre ou Mourir, film de Paul Mignot et Vincent Mottez, 2023, 110 min". Cahiers d'histoire. Revue d'histoire critique (in French) (156): 214–218. doi:10.4000/chrhc.21699. ISSN 1271-6669.
