= Le Puy du Fou =

Historical theme park in France

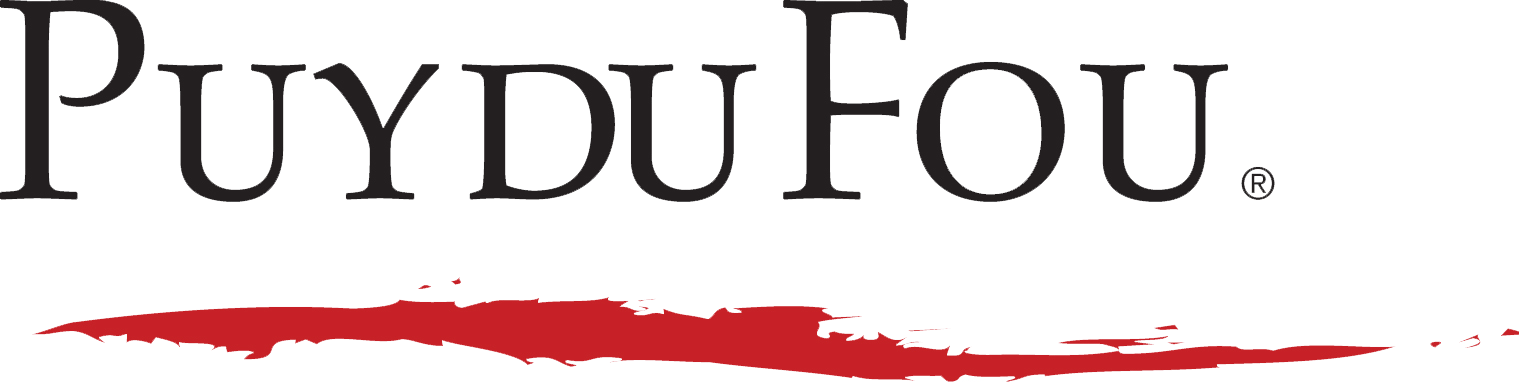

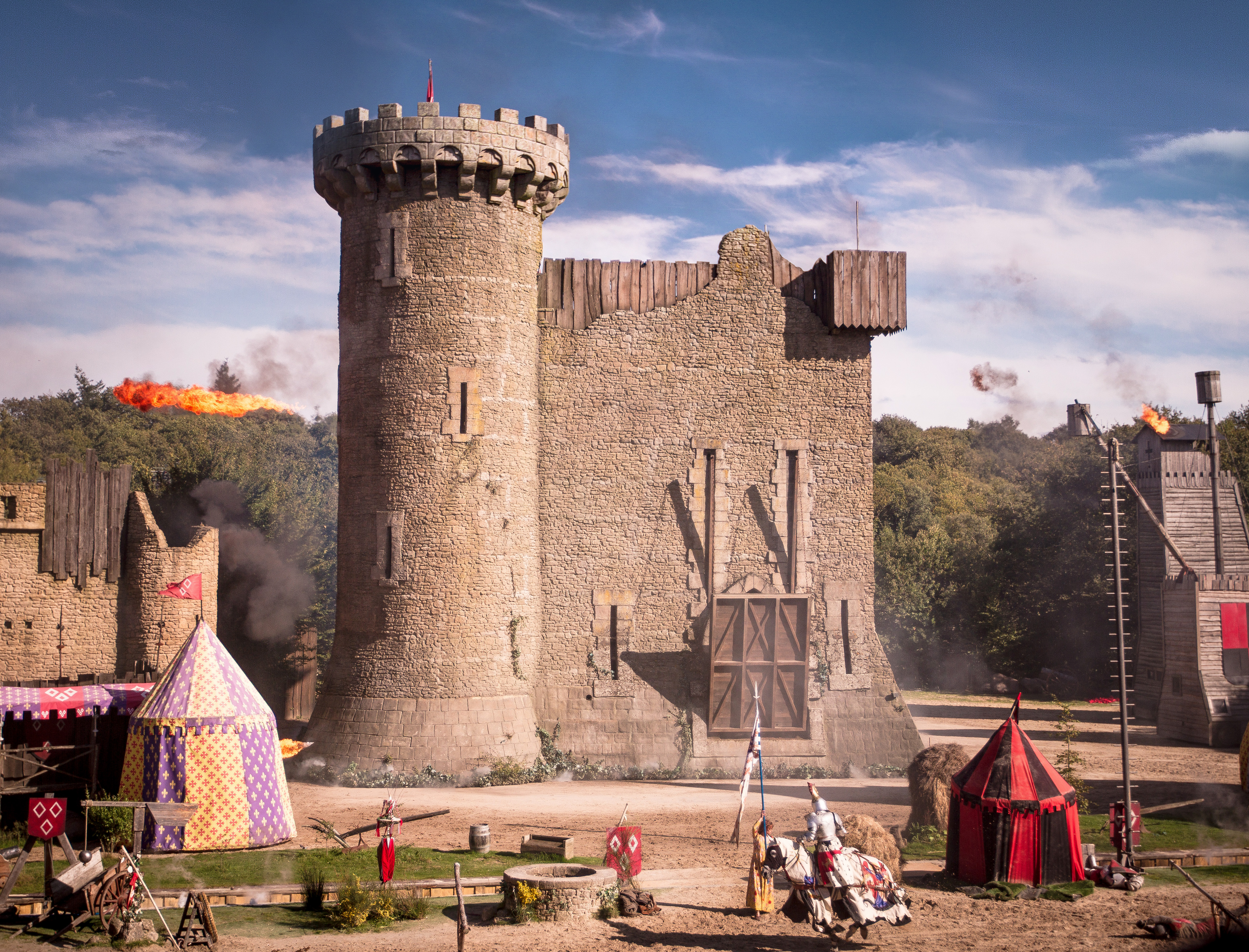
- Le Secret de la Lance
- Interactive map of Le Puy du Fou
- Location: Les Epesses, Vendée, France
- Coordinates: 46.893340°N 0.932068°W
- Opened: Cinéscénie: 1978; Grand Parc: 1989
- Owner: Association du Puy du Fou
- Slogan: "L'Histoire n'attend que vous" (History is waiting for you)
- Operating season: From April to September
- Area: 55 hectares (140 acres)
- Website: Main site

Le Puy du Fou ([pɥi dy fu]; lit. "the jester's hill") is a theme park in Les Epesses, in the Pays de la Loire region of western France. It receives more than two million visitors every year, making it one of the most popular theme parks in France. In 2025, it was the second most visited theme park in France, behind Disneyland Paris.

== History ==
The idea of Puy du Fou originated in 1977, when Philippe de Villiers, a 27-year-old student, decided to create an original show named "Cinéscénie".

On 13 June 1977, Villiers discovered the ruins of an old Renaissance castle in the village of Les Epesses, near Cholet, and wrote a story about a (fictitious) local family named Maupillier (the real name of a soldier of Vendée at the time of the conflict between Vendée and the French Republic during the French Revolution), detailing the family's history from that period until World War II.

Philippe de Villiers organized an association of 600 members (3,650 today) named "l'Association du Puy du Fou", whose current president is his son, Nicolas de Villiers. When Cinéscénie first started in June 1978, the show did not have great success. But during the first season, it flourished and continued to grow from there. It has since spawned its own micro-industry of actors, prop-makers, and trainers for horse riding and sword fighting, which both feature in the show. Since 1988, the "Académies Junior" have organized yearly showings of Cinéscénie, such as at the Paris Paname in the "Halle Renaissance" of the Grand Parc in March 2008.

In August 1980, the President of the French Republic, Valéry Giscard d'Estaing, visited Puy du Fou and attended the Cinéscénie show.

In June 1987, the Prime Minister at the time — and future President of France — Jacques Chirac was hosted by Philippe de Villiers at Puy du Fou. He attended the Cinéscénie show alongside former Prime Minister Raymond Barre and the leader of the National Front, Jean-Marie Le Pen.

The Grand Parc of the Puy du Fou was opened near the Cinéscénie in 1989, and is today one of the most popular theme parks in France. In 2011, the Grand Parc hosted the team presentations before the Tour de France, which was set to begin in the Vendée.

In August 2016, then French Economy Minister Emmanuel Macron visited Puy du Fou alongside Philippe de Villiers. Despite their ideological differences, the two men are said to have a close relationship. In 2020, when Emmanuel Macron was President of the French Republic, he granted preferential treatment to Puy du Fou, pressuring his Prime Minister to authorize the park's reopening and allowing larger crowds (9,000 people) than the usual limit imposed by COVID restriction rules (5,000 people).

On 13 August 2018, the Grand Parc launched a program where specially trained rooks fly around the park to pick up cigarette butts and other small pieces of litter. Christophe Gaborit, the park's Head of Falconry, originally trained the birds to participate in the park's falconry show, but later was inspired to teach them how to pick up rubbish left by the park's visitors. By using a specially created box, inspired by a magician's prop, he taught six of his birds—Boubou, Bamboo, Bill, Black, Bricole, and Baco—to deliver bits of trash to the box and exchange them for food. The goal of the project is both to teach the park's visitors about the birds and to discourage littering.

In 2019, the project expanded abroad with the night show El sueño de Toledo ("The Dream of Toledo") about the history of Spain in Toledo, Spain. It is the first stage of Puy du Fou España. In 2021, it expanded into an entire theme park with five shows and four villages.

In 2024, plans were unveiled for a similar park (called Puy du Fou UK) north of Bucknell, near Bicester, from junction 10 of the M40 in Oxfordshire. The plan currently consists of 4 period villages, 6 outdoor shows and 7 indoor shows. The current timeline projects an opening date in 2029.

== Attractions ==
Puy du Fou is split into 26 main shows, each running for approximately 30–40 minutes:

- Le Secret de la Lance (Secret of the Lance) is set in front of the battlements of a medieval castle. It relates the story of a young shepherdess, Marguerite, who must defend her castle's tower against English knights alone, helped by a lance with supernatural powers.

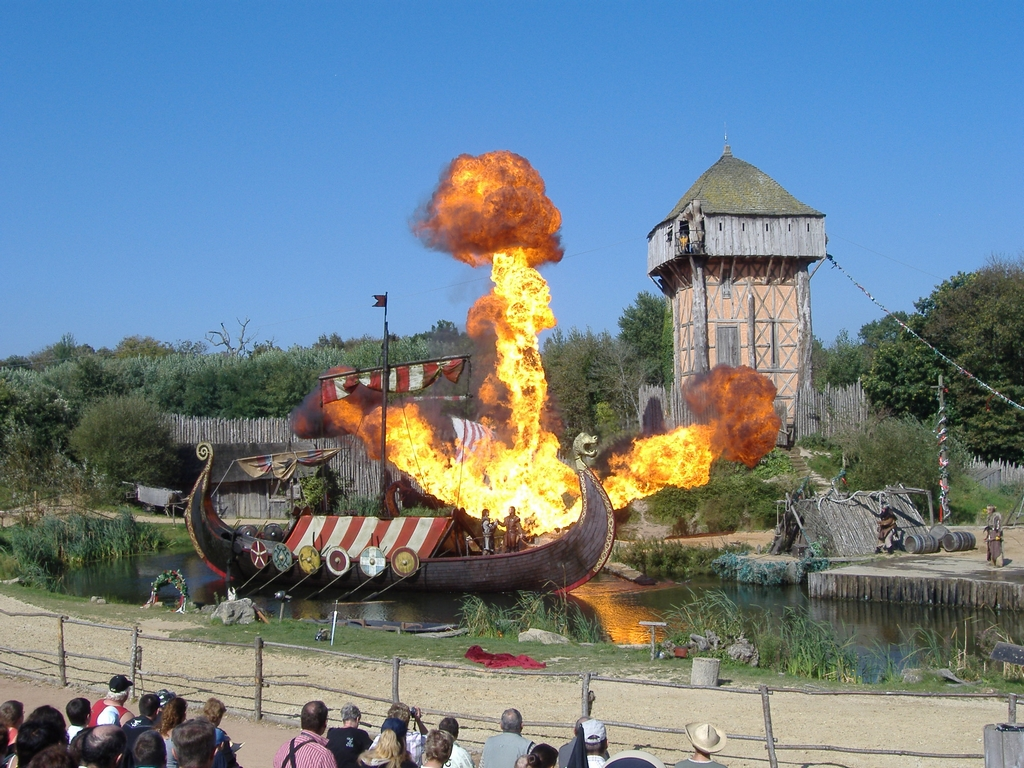
The Vikings

- Les Vikings (The Vikings) is set in a reconstructed 1000-year-old fortress that is attacked by Viking longships. The story begins with a marriage in the village, just before the arrival of a Viking longboat. Special effects include the emergence of a longboat from under water.
- Le Signe du Triomphe (The Sign of Triumph) is set in a replica of an amphitheatre that is 115 meters long and 75 meters wide. It recreates the atmosphere of Roman Gaul at a time of great unrest during the reign of Emperor Diocletian, and features a traditional parade of people and animals, gladiatorial combat, and chariot racing. The 2011 version originally ended with the attempted execution of Christian prisoners involving lions, tigers, and hyenas. This finale was eventually updated in 2022, and now features the full-scale recreation of a naumachia.
- Le Bal des Oiseaux Fantômes (Dance of the Phantom Birds) is a show set to a mysterious story. Dozens of birds of prey surge from the ruins and swoop low over the heads of the visitors. The falcons are placed on the heads of some visitors wearing hats provided by the falconers. Many of the larger birds are released from a balloon floating far overhead. This ends with two hundred birds flying at once above the audience.
- Mousquetaire de Richelieu (Richelieu's Musketeer) features musketeers performing swashbuckling sword fighting and Gypsy girls Flamenco dancing in water. Horses also perform special trotting/jumping techniques.
- Le Dernier Panache (The Last Panache) follows the destiny of a French naval officer, François de Charette de La Contrie, a hero of the American War of Independence, who became one of the leaders of the War in the Vendée against the French Revolution. His activity as a counterrevolutionary leader is framed in the show as a fight for freedom. This show won a THEA Award for outstanding achievement in 2017.
- Le Mime et l'Étoile (The Mime and the Star) takes guests back to the early years of moviemaking, as they attend the production of a black-and-white film on an enclosed set. A romance soon blossoms between the main actress and a mime.
- Les Noces de Feu (The Fire Wedding) takes place at night (except on Fridays and Saturdays during the summer season for the Cinéscénie), entirely on water and depicts the love story between two musicians.

The above shows are presented in French, but electronic translators are available. Immersive shows, especially those relying on live actors, are only available in French. These include:

- Le Monde Imaginaire de La Fontaine (La Fontaine's Imaginary World) is a garden where Jean de la Fontaine's most famous Fables are told through the use of automated animations. It opened in 2012, but was largely updated in 2021 (400 years after La Fontaine's birth) with the addition of lesser-known fables and live actors.
- La Renaissance du Château (Renaissance of the Castle), a tour through the centuries in the historical Puy du Fou Castle. Opened in 2014.
- Les Amoureux de Verdun (The Lovers of Verdun), a recreation of a World War I trench during the winter of 1916. As guests proceed in the war-torn environment, they listen to the correspondence between a soldier and his wife back home, whom he tries to protect from the horrific realities of war in his letters. Opened in 2015 and won the THEA Award for Outstanding Achievement in 2016, one century after the events it depicts.
- Le Mystère de La Pérouse (The Mystery of La Pérouse), a recreation of the ill-fated maritime expedition led by Jean-François de La Pérouse. Guests board La Pérouse's ship, Boussole, and closely follow the story of the Vendean Lieutenant Augustin de Monti. Opened in 2018, it became Europe's Top New Attraction that year.
- Le Premier Royaume (The First Kingdom), a walkthrough retelling the life of Clovis I, the first to unite the Franks into one kingdom. Among many events, this tour variously includes Clovis' war against the remnants of the Roman Empire, the breaking of the Vase of Soissons, or the Frankish king's subsequent conversion to the Christian faith. Opened in 2019 and was awarded Live Entertainment of the Year.

Other smaller shows are also available only in French:

- Les Automates Musiciens (The Musician Automatons), a musical show displaying automaton characters in the Bourg Bérard. Opened in 2004.
- Les Grandes Eaux (The Grand Water Show), a musical fountain show orchestrated to Jean-Baptiste Lully's music.
- Les Chevaliers de la Table Ronde (The Knights of the Round Table) is a retelling of Arthurian Legend in the form of a magic show. Opened in 2013.
- Le Ballet des Sapeurs (Ballet of the Firefighters) is a pantomime musical show portrayed by child actors of the Puy du Fou Académie. Opened in 2017.
- Le Grand Carillon (The Grand Carillon), a musical acrobatic show on the bell tower of the Chasseloup Village. Opened in 2017.

== The Cinéscénie ==
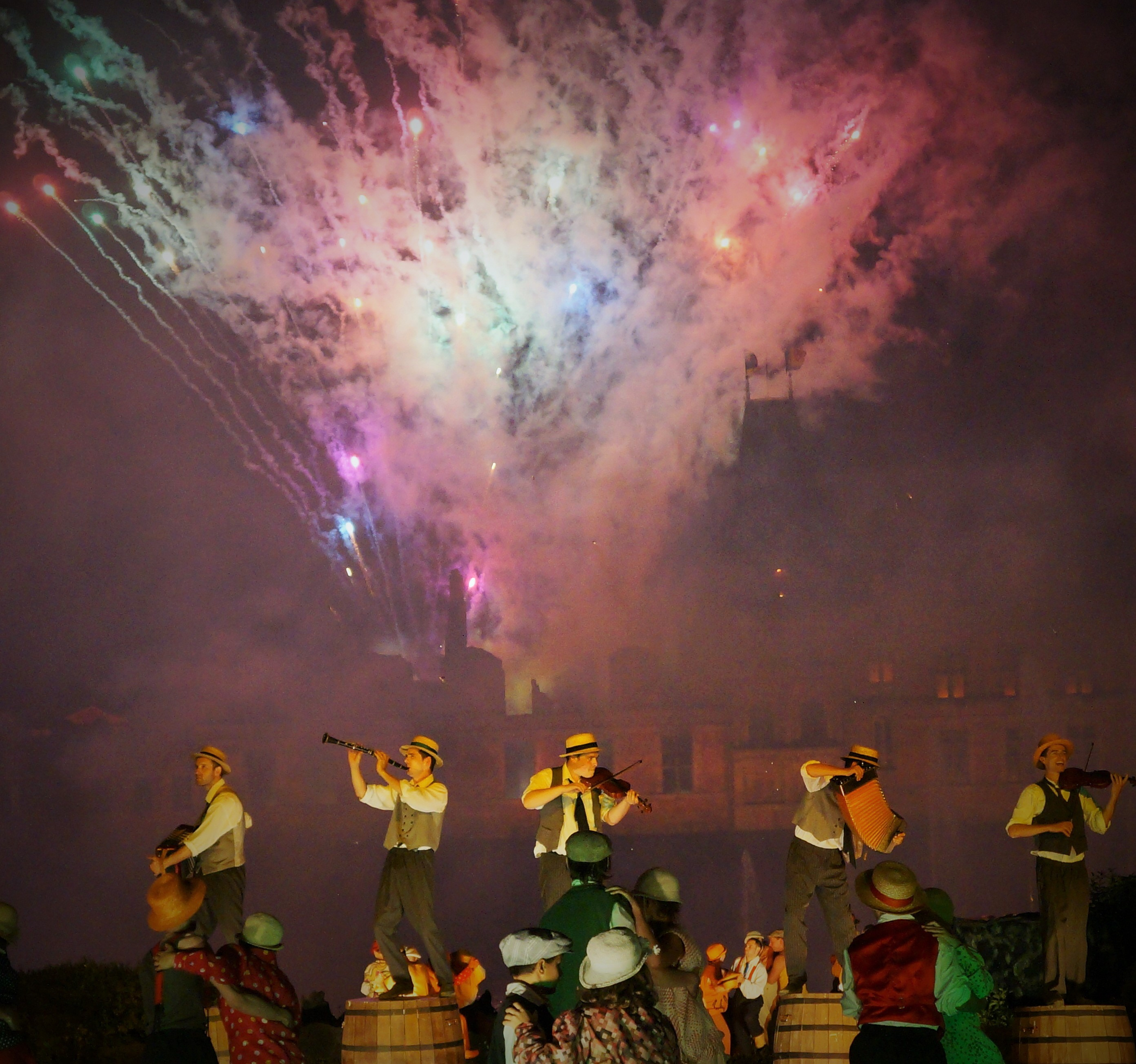
Cinéscénie

The main show takes place in the evening on an outdoor stage. It tells the story of 700 years of history in the area. The Cinéscénie is the largest stage in the world, having 1,200 actors, hundreds of horses, and about 800 fireworks per performance. All of the dialogue is in French, but translation headsets are available in five different languages. All of the actors and actresses, including the children, are volunteers from the local villages. The Cinéscénie is only performed during peak season. It is bookable separately and has a separate entrance.

== La Cité Nocturne ==
In 2007, the park opened its first hotel to encourage guests to stay on property for longer periods of time. Over the years, the hotels have grown in number, and now form a resort southeast of the park named La Cité Nocturne (The Nocturnal City). There are six themed hotels, each allowing guests to choose a century to sleep in.

- La Villa Gallo-Romaine (The Gallo-Roman Villa) is a hotel designed to evoke a Roman Villa in Gaul. Opened in 2007, it was the first Puy du Fou hotel, and originally offered 100 rooms. In 2025, it doubled its capacity with the addition of a full-scale Gallo-Roman street.
- Le Logis de Lescure (Lescure's Lodgings) is the second hotel in the park, which opened in 2009. Designed as a Vendean house of the late 18th century, its name refers to Louis Marie de Lescure, a famous Vendean opponent to the French Revolution. Due to its modest size, it features just four luxury suites.
- Les Îles de Clovis (The Islands of Clovis) opened in 2010. This hotel comprises 50 Merovingian stilt houses from the time of King Clovis I built above ponds.
- Le Camp du Drap d'Or (The Field of the Cloth of Gold) is a 2014 replica of the summit meeting of the same name which occurred in 1520 between Francis I of France and Henry VIII of England. Guests stay in one of the 50 royal tents similar to those set up on that occasion.
- La Citadelle (The Citadel) is a hotel themed to a medieval fortress. It opened in 2017 and offers 100 rooms.
- Le Grand Siècle (The Great Century) is a luxury hotel opened in 2020. Themed to the reign of King Louis XIV, its eight ostentatious pavilions inspired by the now-destroyed Château de Marly offer a total of 96 rooms. It also includes a convention center named Le Théâtre Molière (The Molière Theater).

== Criticism ==
According to communist newspaper L'Humanité, the Cinéscénie (1978) and the park (1989) have faced criticism from some historians about its political propaganda and pseudo-historical views.

Many historians have criticized the Cinescénie's perceived one-sided treatment of the Vendée War. For instance, Michel Vovelle, a professor of French Revolution history at Panthéon-Sorbonne University and a communist activist, describes the Puy du Fou as a "spectacular revision of the French Revolution", offering a "backward-looking vision of the world and a memory that is far from innocent". He concludes: "For French people who have too often lost their historical bearings, in search of a memory of any kind, enemies of violence (which they are right to be) and of the change that they fear, in search of roots, the identitarian affirmation of the Vendée as a memory-region, reviewed and corrected by Mr. Philippe de Villiers, provides a convenient landmark, and all in all, one that is considered satisfactory, whether we rejoice in it or deplore it."

According to French Revolution historian Guillaume Mazeau, "Behind its good-natured atmosphere, the amusement park does not hesitate to exploit French history for political ends" with "a precise project: that of their designer, a certain Philippe de Villiers." The message is that "the Vendéens are a people whom the partisans of the Reign of Terror tried to exterminate between 1793 and 1794. Fortunately, under the Revolution as always, this martyred people has always been able to resist foreign aggression and invasion, preserving its particular genius as well as its eternal identity."

Mazeau has also stated: "Le Puy du Fou, which [De Villiers] launched in 1977, is a war machine that feeds the entire historical imagination of European nationalism. And these lies are given an inordinate amount of visibility, because that is what they are. It is a real problem." As early as the 1980s, historians such as Claude Langlois and Jean-Clément Martin had warned of "the danger of such a representation of history" in which "the French Republic was born of a desire for extermination, even genocide", as described by historian Reynald Secher, who is linked to the "Puy du Fou network". In their view, "the 'Vendéens' were not a people, but individuals of diverse origins, living in 1793 in a region much larger than the present-day département", and divided by the revolution, with the townsfolk in particular supporting the revolution. Without denying the massacres of civilians during the Vendée War, they dispute the use of the term "genocide", as they point out that the massacres only targeted people of certain political opinions and were not aimed at eliminating an entire people, as in the UN's 1948 definition of genocide. It was the "subsequent minimization of the massacres, which were too embarrassing for the national narrative" that "nurtured a process of identity-building, transforming the history of the Vendée into a weapon of war against the Republic. The Puy du Fou is its most successful product."

== Timeline ==
Location	1980	1990										2000										2010										2020					
Location	9	0	1	2	3	4	5	6	7	8	9	0	1	2	3	4	5	6	7	8	9	0	1	2	3	4	5	6	7	8	9	0	1	2	3	4	5
Main Shows
Le Château du Puy du Fou	Le Spectacle de Chevalerie					La Fête de Chevalerie						La Bataille du Donjon										Le Secret de la Lance															
Le Château du Puy du Fou	—N/a																La Bataille du Donjon (Nighttime)				—N/a																
Le Château du Puy du Fou	—N/a																									La Renaissance du Château											
Le Château du Puy du Fou	—N/a																																		La Frairie de la Toussaint		
Le Vieux Château	—N/a	Le Vol des Rapaces		Le Spectacle de Fauconnerie											Le Bal des Oiseaux Fantômes																						
Le Stadium Gallo-Romain	—N/a												Gladiateurs										Le Signe du Triomphe (2011)											Le Signe du Triomphe (2022)			
Le Grand Carrousel	—N/a																	Mousquetaire de Richelieu																			
Le Théâtre des Géants	—N/a																											Le Dernier Panache									
Period Villages and Shows
Chasseloup	Le Village XVIIIème																																		Chasseloup		
Chasseloup	—N/a				Les Musiciens Traditionnels																								Le Grand Carillon								
Font-Rognou	—N/a						La Cité Médiévale																												Font-Rognou		
Font-Rognou	—N/a						Le Magicien Ménestrel																		Les Chevaliers de la Table Ronde												L'Épée du Roi Arthur
Saint Philbert le Vieil	—N/a								Le Fort de l'An Mil																										Saint Philbert le Vieil		
Saint Philbert le Vieil	—N/a								La Légende de Saint Philibert								Les Vikings																				
Le Bourg Bérard	—N/a				La Halle Renaissance																									Le Café de La Madelon							
Le Bourg Bérard	—N/a															Le Bourg 1900																			Le Bourg Bérard		
Le Bourg Bérard	—N/a																Les Automates Musiciens																				
Le Bourg Bérard	—N/a																												Le Ballet des Sapeurs								—N/a
Le Bourg Bérard	—N/a																																		Le Mime et l'Étoile		
Natural Areas and Shows
La Forêt Centenaire	La Vallée Fleurie																																		Le Val de la Marienne		
La Forêt Centenaire	—N/a		Le Chemin de la Mémoire																											Le Mystère de La Pérouse							
La Forêt Centenaire	—N/a				Le Théâtre d'Eau															L'Odyssée du Puy du Fou											Le Premier Royaume						
La Forêt Centenaire	—N/a																										Les Amoureux de Verdun										
La Prairie	—N/a			La Tanière des Loups																				Le Monde Imaginaire de La Fontaine (2012)									Le Monde Imaginaire de La Fontaine (2021)				
La Prairie	—N/a					La Roseraie																													La Roseraie de Ronsard		
La Prairie	—N/a							Le Théâtre des Enfants												La Légende de Martin									La Mijoterie du Roy Henry								
L'Étang	—N/a																				Les Orgues de Feu											Les Noces de Feu					
L'Étang	—N/a																				Les Grandes Eaux																
Hotels
La Cité Nocturne	—N/a																		La Villa Gallo-Romaine																		
La Cité Nocturne	—N/a																				Le Logis de Lescure																
La Cité Nocturne	—N/a																					Les Îles de Clovis															
La Cité Nocturne	—N/a																									Le Camp du Drap d'Or											
La Cité Nocturne	—N/a																												La Citadelle								
La Cité Nocturne	—N/a																															Le Grand Siècle					
Location	9	0	1	2	3	4	5	6	7	8	9	0	1	2	3	4	5	6	7	8	9	0	1	2	3	4	5	6	7	8	9	0	1	2	3	4	5
Location	1980	1990										2000										2010										2020					

== Reception and awards ==
Ghislain de Montalembert wrote that Le Puy du Fou was the "greatest attraction park in the world" in Le Figaro.

- 13 August 2011: Puy du Fou won the silver Jupiter at the Internationale des Feux Loto Quebec, the largest international competition of pyrotechnics, at Montréal.
- 17 March 2012: Puy du Fou received the THEA Classic Award 2012 for "outstanding, breakthrough visitor attractions that have stood the test of time" at Los Angeles.
- 2013: Puy du Fou was awarded the title "Best European theme park" by the Parksmania Awards in Italy.
- 2014: it received the Applause Award from the International Association of Amusement Parks and Attractions.
- 2017: it received the "Hall of Fame Award" at Orlando in Florida during the International Association of Amusement Parks and Attractions Expo.
- 16 March 2024: it received the THEA Award for Best Live Show for "Le Mime et l'Étoile" from the Themed Entertainment Association (THEA).

== See also ==
- Puy du Fou España
