= Puy du Fou España =

Theme park in Toledo, Spain

Coordinates: 39.83950°N 4.09081°W

Puy du Fou España is a Spanish historical theme park opened in 2021 and located in the outskirts of Toledo, in the autonomous community of Castile-La Mancha. The park is part of the French group Association du Puy du Fou. The shows are based on the history of Spain.

Workers, including the General Union of Workers, have complained about the lack of a proper timer register and the quickly changing schedules that causes a lot of unpaid downtime that actors spend in the park, far from Toledo. In 2026, the company denounced its former director Erwan de la Villéon. He was substituted by Oliver Strebelle. The new direction bargained a new collective agreement with the workers for 2026-2029.

== Shows ==
=== Night show ===
- El Sueño de Toledo (The Dream of Toledo) is Puy du Fou España's night-time show depicting the history of Spain in Toledo. The show lasts for about 80 minutes. The show made its debut in 2019, two years before the opening of the park.

=== Daytime shows ===
- A Pluma y Espada (With Pen and Sword) is a swashbuckling show about Lope de Vega.
- El Último Cantar (The Last Song) follows the life of Rodrigo Díaz de Vivar (El Cid).
- Cetrería de Reyes (Falconry of Kings) depicts a falconry competition between Abd al-Rahman III and Fernán González of Castile.
- El Misterio de Sorbaces (The Mystery of Sorbaces) takes place in the time of the Visigoths, where in a hidden place a forbidden union between a Roman and Visigoth is secretly celebrated.
