= Les Epesses =

- Commune
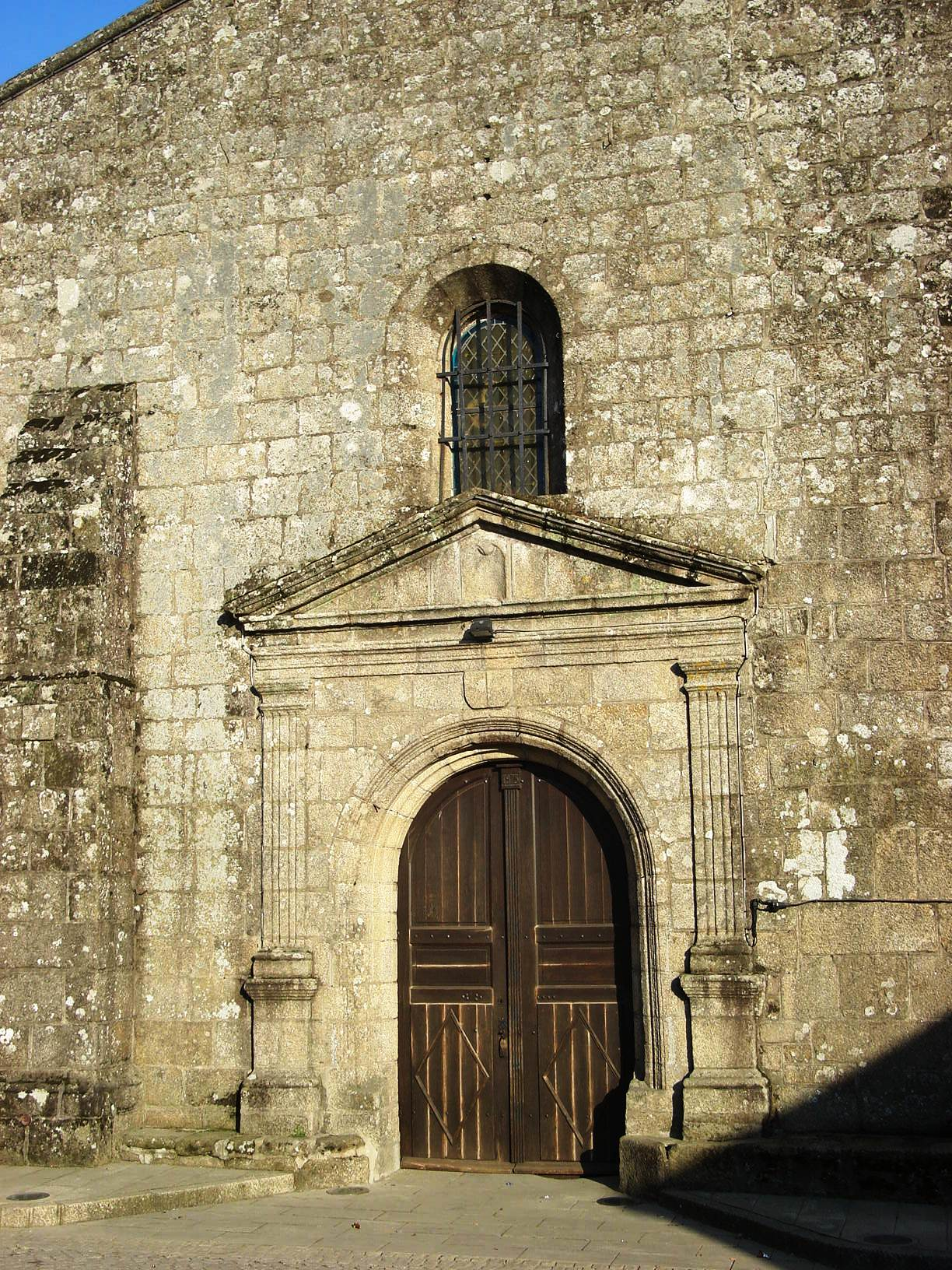
- The church of Our Lady, in Les Epesses

- Coat of arms
- Location of Les Epesses
- Location within France Location within Pays de la Loire
- Coordinates: 46°53′02″N 0°53′53″W
- Country: France
- Region: Pays de la Loire
- Department: Vendée
- Arrondissement: La Roche-sur-Yon
- Canton: Les Herbiers
- Intercommunality: Pays des Herbiers

Government
  - Mayor (2020–2026): Jean-Louis Launay
- Area^{1}: 31.29 km^{2} (12.08 sq mi)
- Elevation: 220 m (720 ft)
- Highest elevation: 254 m (833 ft)
- Lowest elevation: 118 m (387 ft)
- Population (2023): 2,983
  - Density: 95.33/km^{2} (246.9/sq mi)
- Time zone: UTC+01:00 (CET)
  - Summer (DST): UTC+02:00 (CEST)
- INSEE/Postal code: 85082 /85590
- ^{1} French Land Register data, which excludes lakes, ponds, glaciers > 1 km^{2} (0.386 sq mi or 247 acres) and river estuaries.

Les Epesses (French pronunciation: [lez‿epɛs]), also spelled as Les Épesses, is a commune in the Vendée department, Pays de la Loire, western France.

It is best known for the Puy du Fou historical theme park.

== Geography ==
The municipal territory of Les Epesses covers 3,156 hectares. The average altitude of the commune is 182 meters, with levels fluctuating between 118 and 254 meters.

== Population ==
Historical population
Year	Pop.	±% p.a.
1968	1,876	—
1975	1,957	+0.61%
1982	2,016	+0.43%
1990	2,107	+0.55%
1999	2,110	+0.02%
2007	2,477	+2.02%
2012	2,709	+1.81%
2017	2,853	+1.04%
2023	2,983	+0.75%
Source: INSEE

== See also ==
- Communes of the Vendée department
- Puy du Fou
