= Jean-Clément Martin =

French historian

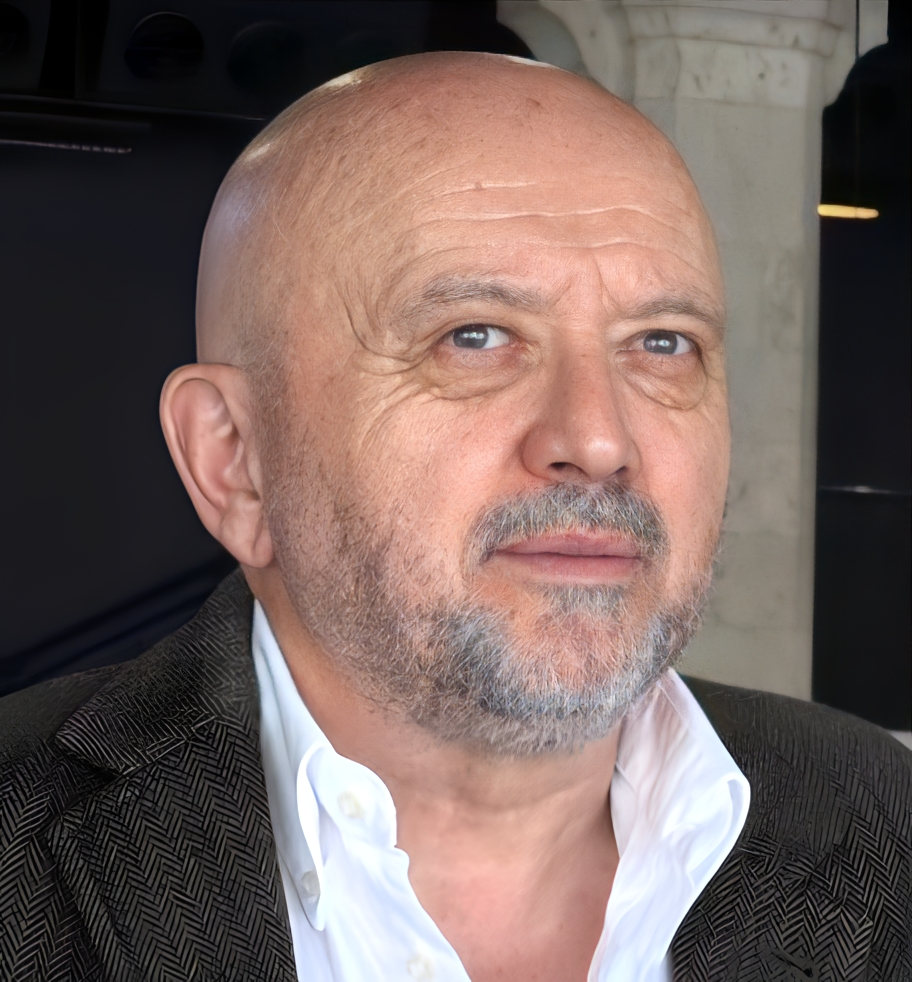
- Jean-Clément Martin at the "Rendez-vous de l'histoire" in Blois (2018)
- Born: 31 January 1948; Thouars, France
- Occupations: Historian; writer; teacher
- Known for: Historian of the French Revolution

Academic background
- Education: Paris-Sorbonne University
- Doctoral advisor: Emmanuel Le Roy Ladurie

Academic work
- Era: French history: Early modern period; French Revolution; Counter-revolutionary; War in the Vendée

Jean-Clément Martin (French: [ʒɑ̃ kləmɑ̃ maʁtɛ̃]; born 31 January 1948) is a French historian, a specialist in the French Revolution, Counter-revolution and the War in the Vendée.

== Biography ==
Martin's doctoral advisor was Emmanuel Le Roy Ladurie. From 2000 to 2008 he was the director of the Institut d'histoire de la Révolution française, connected to the Pantheon-Sorbonne University. Since then he has been professor emeritus.

== Research on the French Revolution ==
He studies the Vendée as a lieu de mémoire or memory space. His research focusses on understanding violence, the contribution of gender history and the role of religion and religiosity in the revolutionary process.

He refuses to consider the operations ordered in Vendée by the National Convention, either the infernal columns or the drownings at Nantes, as genocide. For him, "il y a bien eu des crimes de guerre et des batailles abominables, c'est clair, mais en aucun cas un génocide" [there were war crimes and abominable battles, that's clear, but in no way genocide] during the Vendée wars, the French Revolution having been civil war.

== Works ==
- Vendée-Chouannerie, Nantes, Éditions Reflets du passé, 1981 ISBN 2865070085
- Blancs et Bleus dans la Vendée déchirée, coll. Découvertes Gallimard, 1986 ISBN 2070762068
- La Vendée et la France, 1789-1799, Éditions du Seuil, 1987 ISBN 2020095513
- La Vendée de la Mémoire, 1800-1980, Éditions du Seuil, 1989 ISBN 2020105640
- La Loire-Atlantique dans la tourmente révolutionnaire, Éditions Reflets du Passé, 1989
- Le Massacre des Lucs, Vendée 1794 (with Xavier Lardière), Geste Éditions, La Crèche, 1992
- Une région nommée Vendée, entre politique et mémoire, Éditions Geste, 1996 ISBN 2910919358
- La Révolution française, étapes, bilans et conséquences, Éditions du Seuil, collection Mémo, 1996 ISBN 2020231271
- La Vendée en 30 questions, Geste Éditions, La Crèche, 1996
- Contre-Révolution, Révolution et Nation en France, 1789-1799, Éditions du Seuil, 1998 ISBN 2020258722
- Le Puy du Fou en Vendée, l'Histoire mise en scène (with Charles Suaud), L'Harmattan, 2000 ISBN 2738449514
- La Guerre de Vendée, Éditions Geste, 2001 ISBN 2020095513
- La contre-révolution en Europe siècles. Réalités politiques et sociales, résonances culturelles et idéologiques, Presses universitaires de Rennes, 2001 ISBN 2868475604
- La Révolution française, 1789-1799, Éditions Belin, 2003 ISBN 2701136970
- Violence et Révolution. Essai sur la naissance d'un mythe national, Éditions du Seuil, 2006 ISBN 2020438429Lire une recension de ce titre.
- Loire-Atlantique. Balades aériennes (with Michel Bernard), Patrimoines Medias, 2006 ISBN 2910137600
- Comtesse de Bohm, prisonnière sous la terreur. Les prisons parisiennes en 1793, Éditions Cosmopole, 2006 ISBN 2846300275
- La Vendée et la Révolution. Accepter la mémoire pour écrire l'histoire, Perrin, collection Tempus, 2007 ISBN 2262025975Lire une recension de ce titre
- La Révolution française, Éditions Le Cavalier bleu, collection Idées reçues, 2008 ISBN 2846701873
- La révolte brisée, femmes et hommes dans la Révolution française et l'Empire (1770-1820), Armand Colin, 2008 ISBN 2200346263
- La Terreur. Part maudite de la Révolution, Gallimard, coll. Découvertes Gallimard, 2010 ISBN 2070439143
- Marie-Antoinette, with Cécile Berly, Citadelles-Mazenod, 2010, ISBN 2850883298
- La machine à fantasmes. Relire l'histoire de la Révolution française, Vendémiaire, ISBN 236358029X
- Critical edition of Peut-on prouver l'existence de Napoléon ?, by Richard Whately, Vendémiaire, 2012.
- Nouvelle Histoire de la Révolution française, Perrin, 2012
- Un détail inutile ? Le dossier des peaux tannées. Vendée, 1794, Vendémiaire, 2013, ISBN 978-2-36358-055-9
- La Guerre de Vendée, 1793-1800, Points-Seuil, 2014 ISBN 978-2-7578-3656-9
- La Machine à fantasme, Relire l'histoire de la Révolution française, Vendémiaire, Rééd. poche, 2014
- with Laurent Turcot, Au cœur de la Révolution, les leçons d'histoire d'un jeu vidéo, Paris, Vendémiaire, 2015. ISBN 9782 36358 173 0
- Robespierre, la fabrication d'un monstre, Perrin, 2016, 368 pages
- La Terreur. Vérités et légendes, Perrin, 2017, 238 pages
- Les Echos de la Terreur. Vérités d'un mensonge d'Etat, 1794-2018, Belin, 2018, 316 p., 9782410002065
- Camisards et Vendéens. Deux guerres françaises, deux mémoires vivantes, with Philippe Joutard, Nîmes, Alcide éditions, 2018, 144 p.
- La Vendée de la Mémoire 1800-2018, Paris, Perrin, 2019, 429 p., (ISBN 9782262081409)
- Un aller simple pour la Révolution. Le voyage inutile (novel), self-published, 2020
- Les Vendéens, audio book, Frémeaux et Associés, 2020, (EAN 3561302556826).
- L'Exécution du roi, 21 janvier 1793: la France entre République et Révolution, Paris, Perrin, 2021, 411 p. (ISBN 978-2-262-06988-9)
- Infographie de la Révolution française, Paris, Passés composés, 2021, 127 p. (ISBN 978-2-37933-110-7)
- La Révolution n'est pas terminée: Interventions, 1981-2021, Paris, Passés composés, 2022, 207 p. (ISBN 978-2-37933-777-2)
- Penser les échecs de la Révolution française, Paris, Tallandier, 2022, 250 p. (ISBN 979-10-210-4909-3)
- La Grande Peur de juillet 1789, Tallandier, 2024
- 50 objets racontent la Révolution française, Paris, Eyrolles, 2025, 206 p. (ISBN 978-2-416-01753-7)
- La révolution inachevée des femmes. France 1770-1820, Malakoff, Armand Colin, 2025, 317 p. (ISBN 978-2-200-63957-0)

== See also ==
- Historiography of the French Revolution
