= Reynald Secher =

French historian (born 1955)

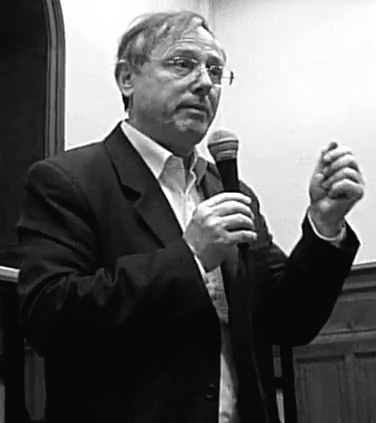
The historian and writer fr: Reynald Secher in France, on March 8, 2012, during his conference "Vendée from genocide to memoricide".

Reynald Secher (born 27 October 1955) is a French historian famous for his work on the War in the Vendée.

== Vendée ==
Under the supervision of Jean Meyer at the Paris-Sorbonne University, Secher wrote a history of his home town, La Chapelle-Basse-Mer. His thesis on the revolt in the Vendée ('Contribution à l'étude du génocide Franco-français: la Vendée-Vengé') won him a Doctorat d'État. These were both published in 1986.

His argument that the suppression of the revolt in the Vendée by the Revolutionary government constituted a genocide was controversial. Reviewers denounced Secher as anti-revolutionary and anti-republican. Laurent Ladouce described the debate:

Many "progressive" thinkers and historians still approve or justify the anti-religious fervor of the revolutionaries. They are thus challenged by a recent discovery made by a 32-year-old historian, Reynald Secher. Secher presented a remarkable doctoral thesis at the Sorbonne, subtitled "The Franco-French Genocide." His thesis demonstrates that the inhabitants of the Vendée region, after they surrendered to the Republic armies in 1793, were systematically exterminated in 1794 by order of the convention led by Robespierre. About 117,000 civilians—including women, and children—were massacred, in order that the "race" of Vendeans be obliterated as a hindrance to the progress of the Revolution.

However, Secher's estimate of the Vendéan casualties was criticised by historians such as Charles Tilly and Michel Vovelle due to objections to Secher's methodology. Tilly accused Secher of using "dubious methods to estimate the losses of population and housing attributable to the counterrevolution and its repression". François Lebrun has argued for a figure of 150,000 rebel dead, while Jean-Clément Martin estimated rebel casualties as numbering between 220,000 and 250,000. Donald Sutherland of the University of Maryland claimed that Secher's figures have been superseded by the research of Jacques Hussenet, who calculated losses of 165,000. Sutherland also argued that the repression of the Vendéans did not constitute a genocide and that Secher showed "an eye-popping gullibility in crediting every anti-republican atrocity story he can find".

== Works ==
- La Chapelle-Basse-Mer. Village vendéen. Révolution et contre-révolution (Paris: Librairie Académique Perrin, 1986). ISBN 2262004021
- Le Génocide Franco-Français. La Vendée-Vengé (Paris: Presses Universitaires de France, 1986). ISBN 2130396186
  - A French Genocide: The Vendée (Notre Dame, Indiana: University of Notre Dame Press, 2003). ISBN 0268028656
