= List of centenarians (military commanders and soldiers) =

The following is a list of centenarians – specifically, people who became famous as military commanders or soldiers – known for reasons other than their longevity. Living people are listed bolded. For more lists, see lists of centenarians.

All supercentenarians (above 110 years old)
Living

Name	Lifespan	Age	Reason for Notability
**Yavar Abbas**	1920–	105	British Indian Army captain
Benjamin H. Adams	1888–1989	100	American admiral
Hassan Alavikia	1910–2013	102	Iranian Army general
Mariano Álvarez	1818–1924	106	Filipino general and President of the Magdiwang
Bud Anderson	1922–2024	102	American Air Force officer and World War II flying ace
Kurt Andersen	1898–2003	104	German Luftwaffe general
Walter Stratton Anderson	1881–1981	100	American vice admiral of the Navy
Stuart Archer	1915–2015	100	British Army officer; recipient of the George Cross
Millie Bailey	1918–2022	104	American World War II veteran
Aaron Bank	1902–2004	101	American army officer; founder of the Special Forces
Russell Bannock	1919–2020	100	Canadian fighter pilot
Bill Bell	1912–2012	100	British army officer
Mélanie Berger-Volle	1921–2026	105	French resistance veteran
Mikhail Beregovoy	1918–2021	103	Soviet Air Defence Forces officer
Sir Clarence Bird	1885–1986	101	British general
Mustafa Şekip Birgöl	1903–2008	105	Turkish military officer and last veteran of the Turkish War of Independence
William Henry Bisbee	1840–1942	102	American general
Stephen J. Bonner Jr.	1918–2021	103	American World War II flying ace
Aleksey Botyan	1917–2020	103	Soviet colonel, spy, partisan and intelligence officer
Aubrey J. Bourgeois	1907–2011	103	American Navy officer
Hugo Broch	1922–2026	104	German World War II flying ace
Lady Martha Bruce	1921–2023	101	British prison governor, Women's Royal Army Corps officer, and aristocrat
Colette Brull-Ulmann	1920–2021	101	French Resistance fighter
Robert Cardenas	1920–2022	102	American Air Force general
Waldemar Levy Cardoso	1900–2009	108	Last surviving Brazilian field marshal
Robert Carter	1910–2012	102	British Royal Air Force officer
Dean Caswell	1922–2022	100	American World War II flying ace
Kenneth O. Chilstrom	1921–2022	101	American air force colonel and test pilot
Sir Philip Christison	1893–1993	100	British general
Ilie Ciocan	1913–2026	112	Romanian World War II veteran
Richard E. Cole	1915–2019	103	American Air Force officer and last living participant of the Doolittle Raid
Lewis Combs	1895–1996	101	American Navy admiral
Daniel Cordier	1920–2020	100	French Resistance fighter (Compagnon de la Libération)
Michael Lindsay Coulton Crawford	1917–2017	100	British Royal Navy officer and submariner
Susan Ahn Cuddy	1915–2015	100	American Navy officer; first female gunnery officer in U.S. Navy
Donald L. Custis	1917–2021	103	American Navy vice admiral
Aaron Daggett	1837–1938	100	Union Army general of the American Civil War
Perry J. Dahl	1923–2024	101	Canadian-born American Air Force officer and World War II flying ace
Philippe de Gaulle	1921–2024	102	French Navy admiral
Udey Chand Dubey	1909–2009	100	Indian Army general
Dai Zijin	1916–2017	101	Chinese Air Force major
Emma Didlake	1904–2015	111	American soldier (Women's Army Auxiliary Corps)
James W. Downing	1913–2018	104	American Navy lieutenant
Leo J. Dulacki	1918–2019	100	American Marine Corps lieutenant general
James Francis Edwards	1921–2022	100	Canadian fighter pilot
William J. Ely	1911–2017	105	American Army officer
William A. Enemark	1913–2016	102	American Army officer
Henry St John Fancourt	1900–2004	103	British Royal Navy officer
Fang Huai	1917–2019	101	Chinese Army major general
Hubert Faure	1914–2021	106	French soldier, Grand Croix of the Legion of Honour recipient
Edward L. Feightner	1919–2020	100	American admiral
John William Finn	1909–2010	100	American Navy officer; Medal of Honor recipient
Mario Fiorentini	1918–2022	103	Italian partisan, spy and mathematician
James Flint	1913–2013	100	British Royal Air Force officer and businessman
Ángeles Flórez Peón	1918–2024	105	Spanish republican militiawoman and socialist activist
**James Clayton Flowers**	1915–	110	American Tuskegee Airman
Dorothy Frooks	1896–1997	101	American author, publisher, military officer, and military lawyer
Robert B. Fulton	1910–2015	104	American Navy officer
**John F. Gonge**	1921–	105	American Air Force officer
Edward Greer	1924–2025	100	American army officer
Harry E. Goldsworthy	1914–2022	107	American Air Force officer
Amedeo Guillet	1909–2010	101	Italian Army officer
Gail Halvorsen	1920–2022	101	American Berlin Airlift pilot
Julia E. Hamblet	1916–2017	100	American military officer
Monique Hanotte	1920–2022	101	Belgian World War II resistance fighter
Reinhard Hardegen	1913–2018	105	German U-boat commander
**James H. Harvey**	1923–	103	American Air Force pilot
Sir Cosmo Haskard	1916–2017	100	British Army officer
Bernice Falk Haydu	1920–2021	100	American aviator and member of the Women Airforce Service Pilots
Charles D. Herron	1877–1977	100	American Army general
Sir George Higginson	1826–1927	100	British general
Dame Felicity Hill	1915–2019	103	British Royal Air Force officer; Director of the Women's Royal Air Force (WRAF; 1966–69)
John L. Hines	1868–1968	100	American general and Chief of Staff of the United States Army
Mad Mike Hoare	1919–2020	100	Irish soldier and mercenary
Henry Clay Hodges	1860–1963	103	American Army major general
Hsu Li-nung	1919–2025	106	Taiwanese military officer, politician and unification activist
James D. Hughes	1922–2024	101	American Air Force general
Frederick Augustus Irving	1894–1995	101	American Army general and West Point Military Academy Superintendent
Albin F. Irzyk	1917–2018	101	American brigadier general
Georgy Vasilyevich Ivanov	1901–2001	100	Soviet Army major general
Richard H. Jackson	1866–1971	105	American Navy admiral
Wacław Jędrzejewicz	1893–1993	100	Polish Land Forces officer, diplomat and college professor
Johnny Johnson	1921–2022	101	British Royal Air Force officer and last surviving original member of No. 617 Squadron RAF and of Operation Chastise, the "Dambusters" raid of 1943
Ernst Jünger	1895–1998	102	German Army officer and notable author
Ed Keats	1915–2019	104	American Navy officer
Orris E. Kelly	1926–2026	100	American army officer, chief of chaplains (1975–1979)
Hedley Kett	1913–2014	100	British Royal Navy officer
Dame Marion Kettlewell	1914–2016	102	British Naval officer; director of the Wrens (1966–1970)
Bill King	1910–2012	102	British Navy officer, yachtsman and author
Nikolai Kirtok	1920–2022	101	Ukrainian-born Russian Red Army pilot, Hero of the Soviet Union (1945)
Norman Kleiss	1916–2016	100	American World War II Navy dive-bomber pilot
Roy L. Kline	1914–2020	105	American Marine brigadier general, served as Military Secretary to the Commandant of the Marine Corps
Franciszek Kornicki	1916–2017	100	Polish fighter pilot
Hermann von Kuhl	1856–1958	102	German Army general
Reidar Kvaal	1916–2016	100	Norwegian Army officer
Traute Lafrenz	1919–2023	103	German-American resistance fighter (White Rose)
Dean S. Laird	1921–2022	101	American World War II flying ace
Geoffrey Langlands	1917–2019	101	British Army Major and Pakistan-based educator
Phyllis Latour	1921–2023	102	South African-born New Zealand intelligence officer (SOE)
Li Guang	1914–2020	106	Chinese Army major general
Liu Zhonghua	1917–2018	101	Chinese Navy admiral
Georges Loinger	1910–2018	108	French soldier during World War II
Sonomyn Luvsangombo	1924–2026	101	Mongolian Army colonel general and politician
Lü Zhengcao	1905–2009	104	Chinese Army general
Ian Lyall Grant	1915–2020	104	British Army general
Stanisław Maczek	1892–1994	102	Polish Army general
Tom Maguire	1892–1993	101	Irish Republican Army activist, commander and politician
Branko Mamula	1921–2021	100	Yugoslav army officer and politician
John Manners	1914–2020	105	British Royal Navy officer and first-class cricketer
Leroy J. Manor	1921–2021	100	American American Air Force lieutenant general, joint commander of Operation Ivory Coast
**Ivan Martynushkin**	1924–	102	Soviet Army soldier, Auschwitz concentration camp liberator
Miloslav Masopust	1924–2026	101	Czechoslovak Army general
Roy Matsumoto	1913–2014	101	American Army officer
Kenneth Mayhew	1917–2021	104	British Army officer; recipient of the Military Order of William
William V. McBride	1922–2022	100	American Air Force general
Charles McGee	1919–2022	102	American fighter pilot and Tuskegee Airman
Seth J. McKee	1916–2016	100	American Air Force general
Donald M. McPherson	1922–2025	103	American World War II flying ace
James Megellas	1917–2020	103	American Army officer
John H. Miller	1925–2025	100	American Marine Corps lieutenant general
Sanford K. Moats	1921–2023	102	American Air Force officer and WWII flying ace
Masaichi Niimi	1887–1993	106	Japanese Navy admiral
Paul R. Norby	1913–2015	102	American Navy officer
Louis M. Nuttman	1874–1978	104	American brigadier general
Francis W. Nye	1918–2019	100	American Air Force major general
Sir Henry Oliver	1865–1965	100	British Admiral of the Fleet
Kate Orchard	1923–2025	102	Veteran of the Women's Auxiliary Corps in India
Phon Paradraksa	1923–2026	103	Thai general and police officer.
Stylianos Pattakos	1912–2016	103	Greek military officer and politician, member of the Greek junta
Frederick R. Payne Jr.	1911–2015	104	American Marine Corps officer
Sir Thomas Pearson	1914–2019	105	British Army general
Raymond E. Peet	1921–2021	100	American Navy vice admiral
Paul D. Phillips	1918–2023	105	American army general
Erich Priebke	1913–2013	100	German Nazi SS captain and war criminal
Yitzhak Pundak	1913–2017	104	Israeli general
**John C. Raaen Jr.**	1922–	104	American major general
Mary Louise Rasmuson	1911–2012	101	American army officer; director, Women's Army Corps
Vasily Reshetnikov	1919–2023	103	Soviet colonel-general of aviation, Hero of the Soviet Union
David C. Richardson	1914–2015	101	American Navy officer
**Guillermo Rodríguez**	1923–	103	Ecuadorian general and politician, acting president (1972–1976)
**Richard Rohmer**	1924–	102	Royal Canadian Air Force reconnaissance pilot, D-Day, Battles of Normandy, Belgium and the Netherlands
Edward Rowny	1917–2017	100	American Army officer
Paul Royle	1914–2015	101	Australian Royal Air Force pilot
Heinrich Ruhl	1915–2015	100	German Army officer
Mary Rundle	1907–2010	103	English superintendent of the Women's Royal Naval Service
Du Runsheng	1913–2015	102	Chinese military officer and agricultural reformer
Mike Sadler	1920–2023	103	British Army officer, last original member of the Special Air Service
Miguel Ángel Sanz Bocos	1918–2018	100	Spanish Army officer and aviator
Helmuth Schlömer	1893–1995	102	German Army general
William Seach	1877–1978	101	American Medal of Honor recipient from the Boxer Rebellion
DeWitt Searles	1920–2021	100	American Air Force major general
Dave Severance	1919–2021	102	American Marine Corps colonel, who led the company responsible for raising the flag on Iwo Jima
Dawn Seymour	1917–2017	100	American Women Airforce Service Pilot and activist
**Surindra Nath Sharma**	1923–	103	Indian Army general
Charles Norman Shay	1924–2025	101	American World War II veteran
John K. Singlaub	1921–2022	100	American general
Ralph C. Smith	1893–1998	104	American major general
William W. Snavely	1920–2020	100	American Air Force lieutenant general
Sergei Sokolov	1911–2012	101	Marshal of the Soviet Union, Hero of the Soviet Union and Soviet Minister of Defence
Deryck Stapleton	1918–2018	100	British Royal Air Force Air Marshal
Guy Stern	1922–2023	101	German-American decorated member of the Ritchie Boys
**Herbert I. Stern**	1918–	107	American Army field artillerist and last surviving pre-war graduate of the United States Military Academy
Dorothy C. Stratton	1899–2006	107	American SPARS director
Elliott B. Strauss	1903–2003	100	American Navy rear admiral
Sun Yuanliang	1904–2007	103	Chinese National Revolutionary Army general
Teiichi Suzuki	1888–1989	100	Japanese lieutenant general
Josef Schütz	1920–2023	102	Lithuanian-born German Nazi concentration camp guard
Zbigniew Ścibor-Rylski	1917–2018	101	Polish brigadier general
Arsène Tchakarian	1916–2018	101	Armenian-born French resistance fighter (FTP-MOI) and historian
Robert E. Thacker	1918–2020	102	American test pilot and bomber pilot of three wars
Radu Theodoru	1924–2025	101	Romanian general
Connell Thode	1911–2014	103	New Zealand Naval officer
Andrey Titenko	1918–2022	103	Soviet soldier, Hero of the Soviet Union (1945)
Dan Tolkowsky	1921–2025	104	Israeli Air Force officer
James L. Underhill	1891–1991	100	American Marine Corps lieutenant general
Necdet Üruğ	1921–2021	100	Turkish military officer and 19th Chief of the Turkish General Staff
Ivan Ustinov	1920–2020	100	Soviet lieutenant general
James Van Fleet	1892–1992	100	American Army general
Neil D. Van Sickle	1915–2019	104	American Air Force general
Ronald R. Van Stockum	1916–2022	105	American Marine brigadier general, who commanded Marine Corps Reserve
Telmo Vargas	1912–2013	100	Ecuadorian general (Chief of Staff)
Zisis Verros	1880–1985	104	Greek chieftain of the Macedonian Struggle; recipient of the Black Emblem of the Macedonian Struggle
Eugene Vielle	1913–2015	101	British Royal Air Force officer
Võ Nguyên Giáp	1911–2013	102	Vietnamese general and Minister of Defence
Herbert Wahler	1921–2023	101	German Einsatzgruppe C member.
Sir Hereward Wake, 14th Baronet	1916–2017	101	British Army officer
Sir Provo Wallis	1791–1892	100	British Admiral of the Fleet
Wan Haifeng	1920–2023	102	Chinese general
Ralph Weymouth	1917–2020	102	American Vice Admiral
Neville Wigram, 2nd Baron Wigram	1915–2017	101	British Army Major
D. B. H. Wildish	1914–2017	102	British Royal Navy officer
Gus Winckel	1912–2013	100	Dutch military officer and pilot
Soerjo Wirjohadipoetro	1917–2022	105	Indonesian lieutenant general
Xiao Ke	1907–2008	101	Chinese general
Xue Yue	1896–1998	101	Chinese general
Yang Yongsong	1919–2022	103	Chinese military officer
Dov Yermiya	1914–2016	101	Israeli lieutenant-colonel in the Israel Defense Forces
Zhang Xueliang	1901–2001	100	Chinese general
Zhang Zhen	1914–2015	100	Chinese general
Nikolai Zhugan	1917–2017	100	Soviet Air Force major general
