= 1913 in the United Kingdom =

Events from the year 1913 in the United Kingdom.

== Incumbents ==
- Monarch – George V
- Prime Minister – H. H. Asquith (Liberal)

== Events ==
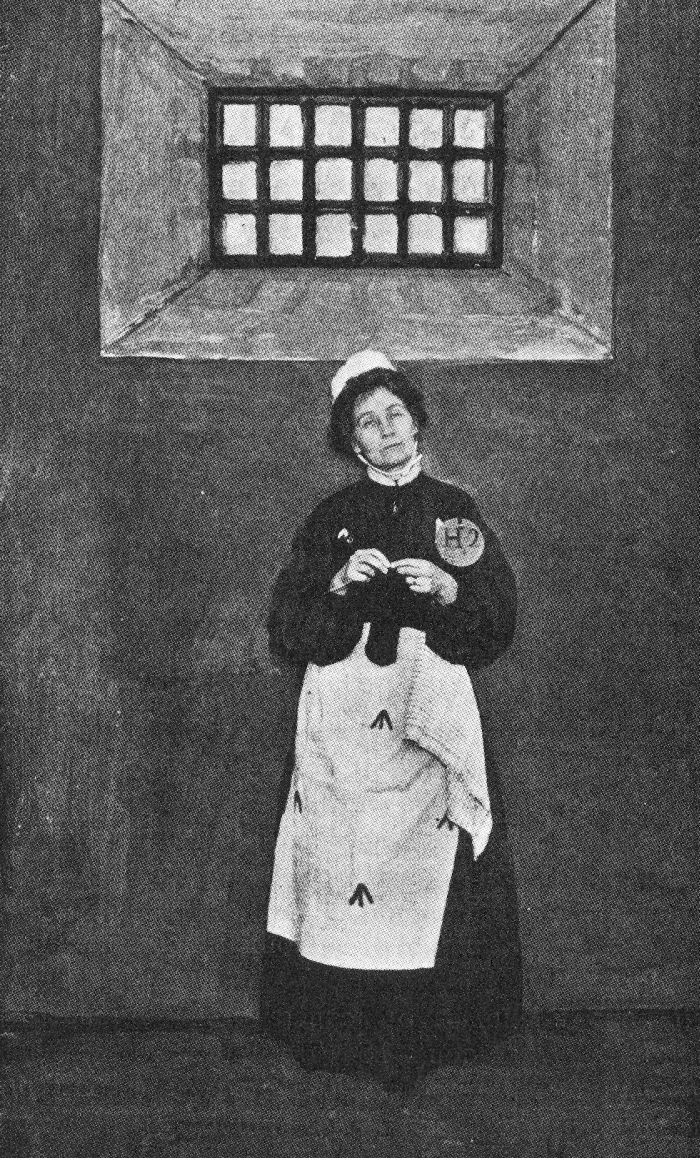
Emmeline Pankhurst in prison dress.

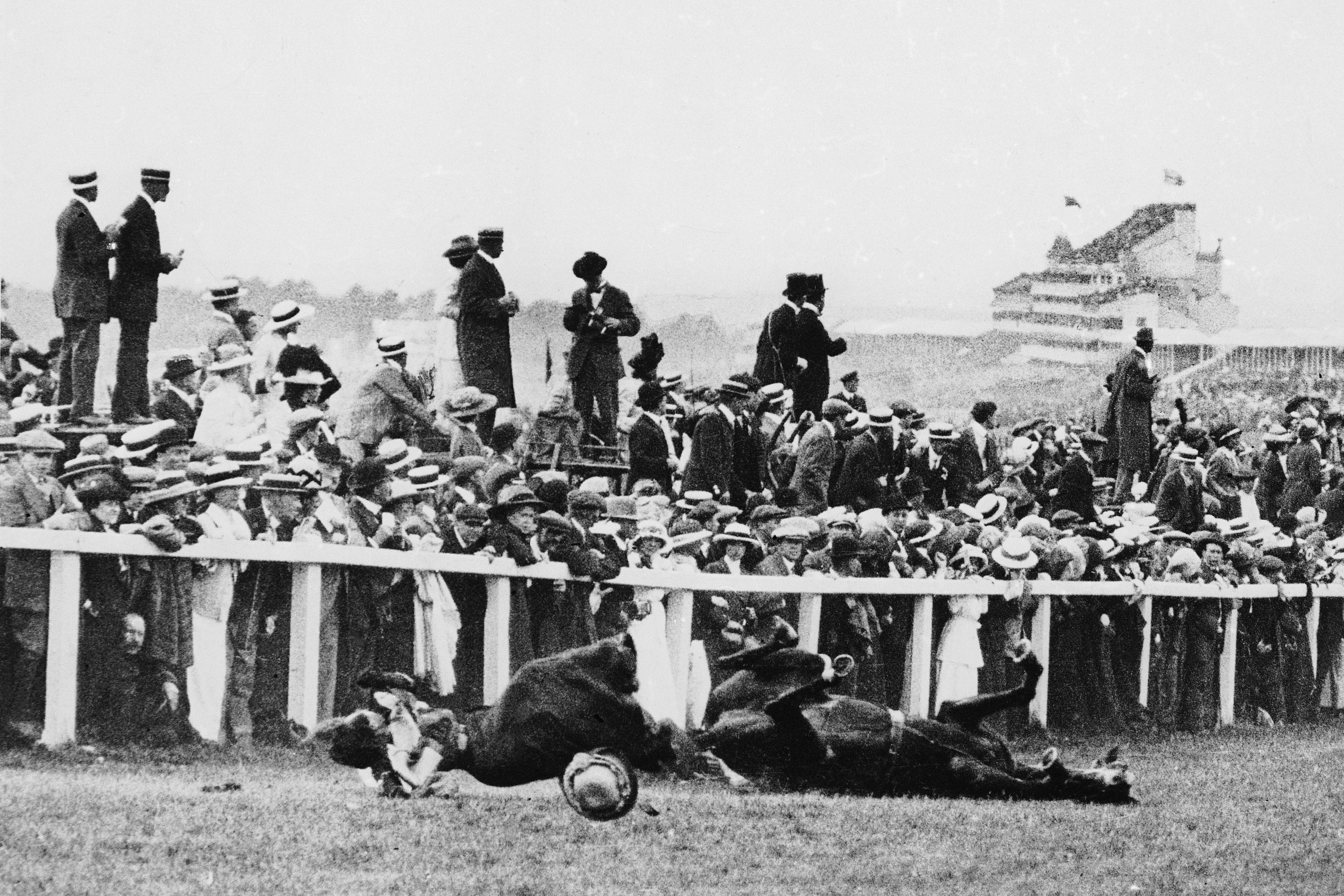
Tragedy at the Derby: Emily Davison and the horse Anmer.

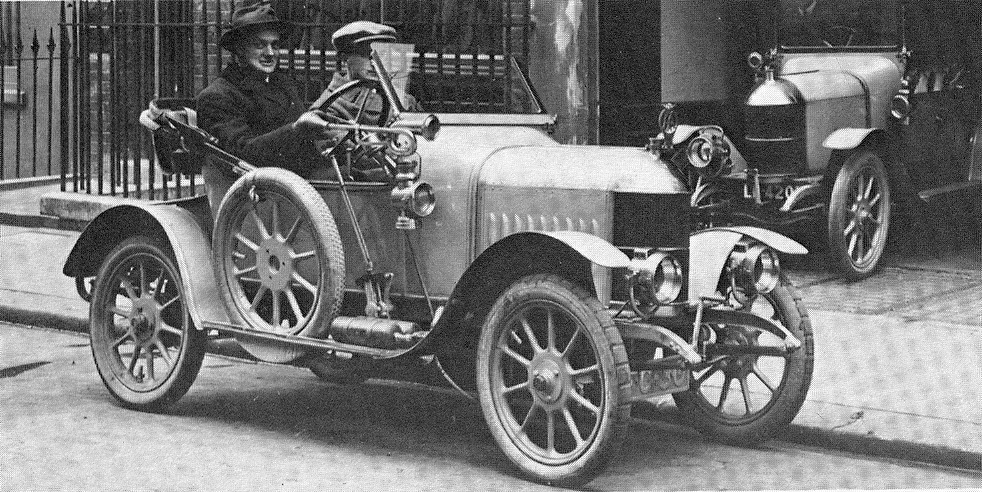
1913 'Bullnose' Morris Oxford.

- 1 January – the British Board of Film Censors begins to classify and censor films.
- 13 January – Edward Carson founds the Ulster Volunteer Force (UVF) by unifying several existing loyalist militias to resist home rule in Ireland.
- 15 January – unemployment and maternity benefits introduced.
- 30 January – the House of Lords rejects the Third Irish Home Rule Bill for the second time, by 326 to 69.
- 10 February – news reaches London of the failure of Capt. Scott's 1912 polar expedition.
- 15 February – Barry Jackson opens the Birmingham Repertory Theatre.
- 19 February – suffragette arson attack on a house being built for David Lloyd George near Walton Heath Golf Club. Emmeline Pankhurst (in a speech in Cardiff this evening) claims to have incited this and other incidents.
- 26 February – the Royal Flying Corps (RFC) establishes the first operational military airfield for fixed-wing aircraft in the UK at Montrose in Scotland.
- c.1 March – British steamship Calvados disappears in the Marmara Sea with 200 on board.
- 28 March – the Morris Oxford 2-seater car goes on sale.
- 2 April – suffragette Emmeline Pankhurst is sentenced to three years of penal servitude.
- 11 April – the Nevill Ground's cricket pavilion in Royal Tunbridge Wells is destroyed in a suffragette arson attack.
- 21 April – the Cunard ocean liner RMS Aquitania, built by John Brown & Company, is launched on the River Clyde.
- 9 May–11 July – major industrial strike in the Black Country of England.
- 20 May – the first ever Chelsea Flower Show is held in London.
- 4 June – Emily Davison, a suffragette, runs out in front of the King's horse, Anmer, at the Epsom Derby. She is trampled and dies four days later on 8 June, never having regained consciousness.
- 26 June – first female magistrate appointed, Miss Emily Dawson, in London.
- 7 July – the Irish Home Rule Bill is once again carried in the House of Commons, despite attempts by Bonar Law to obstruct it.
- 26 July – 50,000 women take part in a pilgrimage in Hyde Park, London organised by the National Union of Women's Suffrage Societies.
- 7 August – American-born aviation pioneer Samuel Franklin Cody is killed with his passenger (English cricketer William Evans) when his Cody Floatplane breaks up in a flight from Farnborough, Hampshire.
- 13 August – invention of stainless steel by Harry Brearley in Sheffield (concurrent with its invention in the United States by Elwood Haynes).
- 15 August – Mental Deficiency Act 1913 passed, establishing a Board of Control for Lunacy and Mental Deficiency to oversee the implementation by local Mental Deficiency Committees of provisions for the care and management people classed as "Idiots", "Imbeciles", "Feeble-minded persons" and "Moral Imbeciles", who are to be committed to institutions, including a new category of "mental deficiency colony".
- 26 August – Dublin lock-out: members of James Larkin's Irish Transport and General Workers' Union employed by the Dublin United Tramways Company begin strike action in defiance of the dismissal of trade union members by the chairman, businessman William Martin Murphy.
- 31 August ('Bloody Sunday') – Dublin lock-out: the Dublin Metropolitan Police kill one demonstrator and injure 400 in dispersing a demonstration in Sackville Street (Dublin).
- August – fifty sperm whales strand on the coast of Cornwall.
- September – Army Manoeuvres of 1913: a fighting retreat from a position near Daventry and the use of spotter aircraft are practised.
- 6 September – Arsenal F.C., previously based in Plumstead, South London, move into their new stadium at Highbury, North London.
- 18 September – Avro 504 military aircraft first flies; more than 10,000 will be built.
- c. 1 October – Caroline Spurgeon named Hildred Carlile professor of English literature, University of London, the second woman professor in England.
- 14 October – 439 miners die in the Senghenydd Colliery Disaster, Britain's worst pit disaster.
- 16 October – HMS Queen Elizabeth launched at Portsmouth Dockyard as the Royal Navy's first oil-fired battleship.
- 20 December – serious fire at Portsmouth Dockyard destroys the semaphore tower.

=== Undated ===
- Sir Aston Webb remodels Buckingham Palace's main East Front, in London.
- Carter's Crisps of London introduce commercial manufacture of potato crisps to the UK.

== Publications ==
- E. C. Bentley's novel Trent's Last Case.
- Ethel Carnie's working class novel Miss Nobody.
- Walter de la Mare's Peacock Pie: a book of rhymes.
- Arthur Holmes' book The Age of the Earth, describing the estimation of the age of the Earth to 1.6 billion years using radiometric dating.
- D. H. Lawrence's novel Sons and Lovers.
- Alfred North Whitehead and Bertrand Russell, 3rd volume of Principia Mathematica, one of the most important and seminal works in mathematical logic and philosophy.

== Births ==
- 2 January – Anna Lee, actress (died 2004 in the United States)
- 9 January – Eric Berry, actor (died 1993)
- 13 January – Lotte Berk, dancer and dance teacher (died 2003)
- 16 January – Tom Burns, sociologist (died 2001)
- 17 January – Shaun Wylie, mathematician and World War II codebreaker (died 2009)
- 18 January – George Unwin, World War II fighter ace (died 2006)
- 27 January – Jack Lee, film director (died 2002)
- 30 January – Percy Thrower, gardener and broadcaster (died 1988)
- 4 February – Richard Seaman, motor racing driver (died 1939)
- 6 February – Mary Leakey, anthropologist (died 1996)
- 10 February – Douglas Slocombe, cinematographer (died 2016)
- 13 February – George Barker, poet (died 1991)
- 15 February – William Scott, Ulster Scots painter (died 1989)
- 17 February – Frederick Higginson, fighter pilot (died 2003)
- 28 February – Wally Ridley, record producer and songwriter (died 2007)
- 1 March – R. S. R. Fitter, nature writer (died 2005)
- 9 March – John Fancy, aviator (died 2008)
- 15 March
  - George Bennions, fighter pilot (died 2004)
  - Jack Fairman, racing driver (died 2002)
- 21 March – George Abecassis, racing driver (died 1991)
- 22 March – Cyril Hart, forestry expert (died 2009)
- 29 March
  - Jack Jones, trade union leader (died 2009)
  - R. S. Thomas, Welsh poet (died 2000)
- 31 March – Walter Winterbottom, footballer (died 2002)
- 3 April – Peter Coke, actor (died 2008)
- 5 April – Anne Scott-James, journalist (died 2009)
- 11 April – Chrystabel Leighton-Porter, model (died 2000)
- 16 April
  - Charles McLaren, 3rd Baron Aberconway, industrialist and horticulturalist (died 2003)
  - Les Tremayne, actor (died 2003)
- 17 April – Miss Read, novelist (died 2012)
- 19 April – Michael Wharton, humorist "Peter Simple" (died 2006)
- 21 April – Norman Parkinson, photographer (died 1990)
- 24 April – Lady Marguerite Tangye, debutante and actress (died 2002)
- 29 April – Eugene Vielle, Royal Air Force officer and inventor (died 2015)
- 1 May – Florence Bell, scientist (died 2000)
- 4 May – Charles Rob, surgeon (died 2001)
- 6 May – Stewart Granger, actor (died 1993 in the United States)
- 8 May – Sid James, South African-born comic actor (died 1976)
- 10 May – Alan Gemmell, botanist (died 1986)
- 12 May – Hugh Latimer, actor (died 2006)
- 18 May – Jane Birdwood, politician (died 2000)
- 24 May – James Flint, Royal Air Force officer, businessman (died 2013)
- 25 May – Richard Dimbleby, journalist and broadcaster (died 1965)
- 26 May – Peter Cushing, actor (died 1994)
- 27 May – Linden Travers, actress (died 2001)
- 29 May – Douglas Black, physician (died 2002)
- 31 May – Graham Webster, archaeologist (died 2001)
- 1 June
  - Patrick Dalzel-Job, naval commando (died 2003)
  - Bill Deedes, journalist and politician (died 2007)
- 2 June – Barbara Pym, novelist (died 1980)
- 14 June – Stanley Black, musician (died 2002)
- 15 June
  - Trevor Huddleston, Anglican bishop and anti-apartheid activist (died 1998)
  - John Sinclair Morrison, classicist (died 2000)
- 23 June – Mollie Harris, radio actress and author (died 1995)
- 25 June – Cyril Fletcher, comedian (died 2005)
- 28 June
  - Maldwyn James, Welsh rugby union player (died 2003)
  - George Lloyd, composer (died 1998)
- 30 June – Henry Leask, general (died 2004)
- 2 July – Marcus Sieff, Baron Sieff of Brimpton, businessman (died 2001)
- 3 July – William Deakin, World War II soldier and historian (died 2005)
- 10 July – Elizabeth Inglis, actress (died 2007)
- 18 July – Nat Temple, band leader (died 2008)
- 21 July – Catherine Storr, children's writer (died 2001)
- 23 July – Michael Foot, Labour Party leader 1980–1983 (died 2010)
- 25 July – John Cairncross, Scottish-born public servant, spy for the Soviet Union, academic and writer (died 1995)
- 28 July
  - Hedley Kett, British naval officer (died 2014)
  - Rosemary Murray, educator and chemist (died 2004)
- 30 July – Marjorie Williamson, educator (died 2002)
- 3 August – Paul Bryan, politician (died 2004)
- 11 August – Angus Wilson, novelist and short story writer (died 1991)
- 14 August – Fred Davis, snooker and billiards player (died 1998)
- 16 August – Monty Berman, cinematographer (died 2006)
- 21 August – Arnold Goodman, Baron Goodman, lawyer and political adviser (died 1995)
- 30 August – Richard Stone, economist, Nobel Prize laureate (died 1991)
- 31 August – Bernard Lovell, physicist and radio-astronomer (died 2012)
- 2 September – Bill Shankly, football manager (died 1981)
- 4 September – Victor Kiernan, Marxist historian (died 2009)
- 7 September
  - Martin Charteris, Baron Charteris of Amisfield, army officer and courtier (died 1999)
  - Anthony Quayle, actor (died 1989)
- 8 September – Mary Hardwick, tennis player (died 2001)
- 23 September – Andy Barr, Irish communist and trade unionist (died 2003)
- 26 September – Terence Patrick O'Sullivan, civil engineer (died 1970)
- 29 September – Trevor Howard, actor (died 1988)
- 2 October – Vivian Ridler, printer and typographer (died 2009)
- 7 October – Derek Lang, general (died 2001)
- 12 October – Alice Chetwynd Ley, romance writer (died 2004)
- 19 October – Robert Yewdall Jennings, judge (died 2004)
- 22 October – Tamara Desni, actress (born in Germany; died 2008)
- 23 October – David Tabor, physicist (died 2005)
- 26 October
  - Harry Kartz, businessman (died 2016)
  - Hugh Scanlon, trade union leader (died 2004)
- 27 October – Leonard Rosoman, painter (died 2012)
- 28 October – Douglas Seale, English actor (died 1999)
- 5 November
  - Guy Green, filmmaker (died 2005)
  - Vivien Leigh, actress (born in British India; died 1967)
- 8 November – Frederick Gore, painter (died 2009)
- 11 November – Ivy Benson, bandleader (died 1993)
- 12 November – Kenneth Steer, archaeologist (died 2007)
- 13 November – Hermione, Countess of Ranfurly, novelist (died 2001)
- 14 November – Eve Gardiner, beautician and remedial make-up artist (born 1992)
- 21 November – John and Roy Boulting, film directors and producers (died 1985 and 2001 respectively)
- 22 November – Benjamin Britten, composer (died 1976)
- 26 November – Sybil Marshall, writer (died 2005)
- 27 November – Robert Dougall, broadcaster (died 1999)
- 9 December – Peter Smithers, Conservative politician (died 2006)
- 10 December – Harry Locke, character actor (died 1987)
- 12 December – Edward Lowbury, bacteriologist (died 2007)
- 13 December – Arnold Brown, Salvation Army general (died 2002)
- 21 December – Boulting brothers, twin filmmakers (died 1985 and 2001)
- 26 December – Elizabeth David, née Gwynne, cookery writer (died 1992)

== Deaths ==
- 23 January – Frederick Holman, Olympic gold medal swimmer (born 1883; typhoid)
- 17 February – Edward Stanley Gibbons, philatelist, founder of Stanley Gibbons Ltd (born 1840)
- 25 March – Garnet Wolseley, 1st Viscount Wolseley, field marshal (born 1833 in Ireland; died in France)
- 28 May – John Lubbock, 1st Baron Avebury, pre-historian and naturalist (born 1834)
- 30 May – John Oldrid Scott, architect (born 1841)
- 2 June – Alfred Austin, Poet Laureate (born 1835)
- 8 June – Emily Davison, suffragette (born 1872)
- 28 September – Sir Alfred East, painter (born 1844)
- 25 October – Frederick Rolfe, writer and artist (born 1860)
- 6 November – Sir William Henry Preece, electrical engineer and inventor (born 1834)
- 7 November – Alfred Russel Wallace, evolutionary biologist (born 1823 in Monmouthshire)
- 26 November – Frances Julia Wedgwood, feminist novelist, biographer and critic (born 1833)

== See also ==
- List of British films before 1920
