= Yuri Pisarev =

Russian scientist (1916–1993)

- Юрий Писарев
- Born: 26 March 1916; Moscow, Soviet Union
- Died: 11 March 1993 (aged 76)
- Resting place: Troyekurovskoye Cemetery
- Education: Leningrad State University
- Occupation: Historian
- Employer: RAN Institute of Archaeology
- Awards: (1987)
- Scientific career
- Fields: History

Yuri Alekseevich Pisarev (Russian: Юрий Алексеевич Писарев; March 26, 1916, Moscow – March 11, 1993, Moscow) was a Soviet and Russian historian, specializing in the modern history of Central and Eastern Europe, the history of World War I, and international relations. He was a Corresponding Member of the USSR Academy of Sciences in the Department of History (history of the socialist countries of Eastern Europe) from December 26, 1984, and an Academician of the Russian Academy of Sciences from June 11, 1992.

== Biography ==
He graduated from the History Department of Leningrad State University (1941). He participated in the Great Patriotic War, and served in the Leningrad militia. He was a member of the Communist Party of the Soviet Union from 1947, a graduate of the Ural State graduate school, and a PhD in history (1950, dissertation: "Agrarian Relations and the Peasant Movement in the Serbo-Croatian-Slovene State in 1918–1923"). From 1950 to 1953, he headed a department at the journal Voprosy istorii (Problems of History). He taught at MGIAI (now the Historical and Archival Institute of the Russian State University for the Humanities) and at the History Department of Moscow State University (1980 to 1983).

Until 1959, he worked at the Institute of History of the USSR Academy of Sciences, and later at the Institute of Slavic and Balkan Studies (Institute of Slavic Studies of the Russian Academy of Sciences) as a sector head (1962 to 1989), chief researcher, and advisor to the directorate. He participated in the publication of fundamental collections of documents as part of joint projects between the USSR Academy of Sciences and academic institutions in Yugoslavia and People's Republic of Bulgaria: "The First Serbian Uprising of 1804-1813. and Russia" (volumes 1-2, Moscow, 1980-1983), "The Liberation Struggle of the Peoples of Bosnia and Herzegovina and Russia" (volumes 1-2, Moscow, 1985-1988), etc.

He is buried at the Troyekurovskoye Cemetery.
