= Herbert Stern =

Herbert Stern may refer to:

- Herbert Stern, 1st Baron Michelham (1851–1919), British financier and philanthropist
- Herbert Jay Stern (born 1936), American lawyer and judge
- Herbert I. Stern (born 1918), United States Army officer
