= Kate Orchard =

British Second World War veteran (1922–2025)

- Born: 24 April 1922; British India
- Died: 4 April 2025 (aged 102); Cornwall, England
- Known for: Second World War veteran

Kate Orchard (24 April 1922 – 4 April 2025) was a British veteran and campaigner. She served in the Second World War and later in life was a fundraiser for military charities.

== Biography ==
Kate Orchard was born on 24 April 1922, into a large Anglo-Indian family as one of 13 children. She spent much of her childhood attending boarding schools in India as her father worked in the railways. Orchard joined the Women's Auxiliary Corps in India in 1942 and worked alongside both the Royal Air Force (RAF) and the Indian Air Force. Her work involved being a plotter which meant working on 24-hour watches, plotting aircraft targets and sending signals via air warning systems.

She rose to the rank of warrant officer first class and became a trainer of new plotters. She also met her husband Bill during the war. He was serving in India with the Royal Artillery before he was sent to Burma. The couple married in 1944, and following the war in 1946, the couple moved to his home in Cornwall, which was her first time visiting England.

Later in life, she resided in Camborne. In 2013, she was featured in a special exhibition in London. In 2020, she was invited to attend the recent annual Battle of Britain Sunday service, at Westminster Abbey. In April 2022, she took to the skies in a glider aged 99 to raise money for Help for Heroes. The plane took off from RNAS Culdrose in Helston. One week later she turned 100. She received a bottle of Royal Champagne from the King to mark her 100th birthday. As a charity fundraiser she sold poppies to raise money for the Royal British Legion. In 2023, she became the oldest person in Britain to fly on stage after being nominated by her granddaughter Kyra to be lifted by the wires at the Cornwall Playhouse.

A great-grandmother, Orchard was a regular churchgoer and ran a Scrabble club for more than 15 years.

Orchard died in Cornwall on 4 April 2025, at the age of 102.

== See also ==
- List of centenarians (military commanders and soldiers)
