= Ivan Vertelko =

Russian military officer (1926–2021)

- Ivan Vertelko in 1958
- Native name: Иван Петрович Вертелко
- Born: 17 August 1926; Strigovo, Pochepsky Uyezd, Bryansk Governorate, Russian SFSR, Soviet Union
- Died: 14 June 2021 (aged 94)
- Buried: Troyekurovskoye Cemetery
- Allegiance: Soviet Union
- Branch: Soviet Tank Forces; Soviet Border Forces
- Service years: 1940–1988
- Rank: Colonel General
- Commands: 3rd Guards Tank Division
- Conflicts: Second World War; Soviet–Afghan War
- Awards: Order of Lenin (2x); Order of the October Revolution; Order of the Red Banner (2x); Order of the Patriotic War, 1st Class; Order of the Red Banner of Labour; Order of the Red Star; Order "For Service to the Homeland in the Armed Forces of the USSR", 3rd Class; Medal "For Battle Merit"; Medal "For the Victory over Germany in the Great Patriotic War 1941–1945"

Ivan Petrovich Vertelko (Russian: Иван Петрович Вертелко; 17 August 1926 – 14 June 2021) was an officer of the Soviet military who held a number of posts in the Soviet Tank Forces, and later the Soviet Border Forces, reaching the rank of colonel general.

Born in 1926, Vertelko was still a child when the Second World War broke out, and following the Axis invasion of the Soviet Union in 1941, lived for some time under German occupation. He narrowly avoided being deported to Germany by escaping from a camp, and in 1943 joined the Red Army at the age of 17. He initially served as a scout in a motorcycle reconnaissance battalion, going on to see action at the liberation of Minsk and during the Vilnius offensive. Wounded in action, he lost a finger, and received the Order of the Red Star when defending against counterattacks, before joining the tank forces as a crewman on a T-34. In this role he saw out the war, but continued to serve in the armed forces.

By now attached to the tank forces, Vertelko studied at several schools and rose through the ranks and positions to more senior commands. He studied at the Military Academy of the Armoured Forces, and later at the Military Academy of the General Staff, and after distinguishing himself in military exercises, became first deputy commander of the 5th Guards Tank Army. He then made a radical switch in his career after being transferred to the Soviet Border Forces, who were in the process of equipping with new heavier armaments, and who needed an experienced commander. He served as deputy head of the Main Directorate for the Internal Affairs of the KGB, and then as first deputy head of the Main Directorate of the KGB, being heavily involved in the deployment of the Border Forces during the Soviet–Afghan War. Retiring in 1990, he wrote his memoirs and remained active in veterans' affairs, before his death in 2021 at the age of 94.

== Early life and career ==
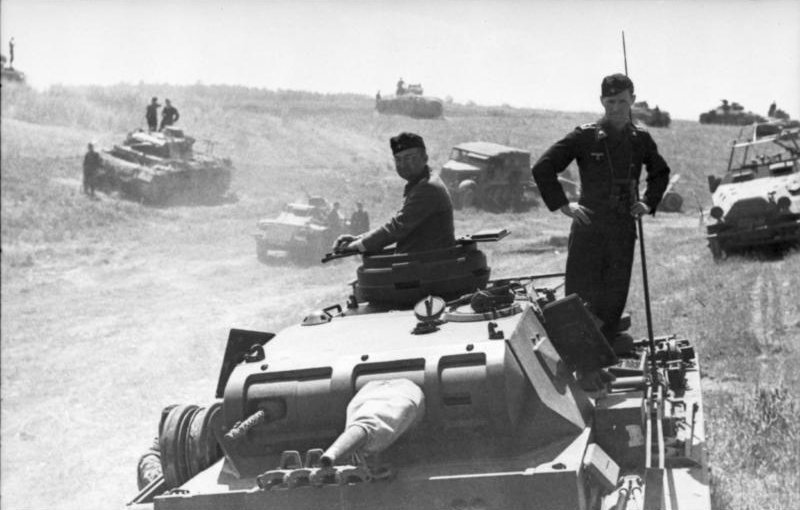
June 1941, Operation Barbarossa. German troops advanced, occupying large areas of the Soviet Union, including Vertelko's home village.

Vertelko was born on 17 August 1926 into a Russian family in the village of Strigovo, in what was then Pochepsky Uyezd, Bryansk Governorate, part of the Russian SFSR, in the Soviet Union. His father, Petr Prokhorovich Vertelko (1897-1981) had served in World War I, the October Revolution and the Russian Civil War. His mother was Nina Nikiforovna Vertelko (née Gubko; 1898-1994). In addition to Ivan, the couple had seven girls.

He graduated from the four-year classes in his village school, followed by a further seven years study at an evening school, located 7 kilometres (4.3 mi) away. To finish this seven years of study he had to travel to the village of Pavlovka, some 40 miles (64 km) from Strigovo. With the Axis invasion of the Soviet Union in 1941, Vertelko was employed in constructing defensive positions for a time. Despite these efforts, the area was occupied by German forces, and Vertelko was for a time living under German occupation. During this period he narrowly avoided deportation to Germany, escaping from a concentration camp.

== Wartime service ==
Vertelko joined the Red Army in October 1943, initially undergoing training with the 72nd Reserve Training Rifle Regiment of the 9th Rifle Division. He would later recall that he first took the oath on 3 November 1943. With the completion of his training, he was dispatched to the front in March 1944, serving as a scout in the 75th Motorcycle Reconnaissance Battalion of the 29th Tank Corps, with the 5th Guards Tank Army. He had a narrow escape when a comrade offered to exchange trenches with him prior to a German counterattack. A shell hit Vertelko's former trench, killing the man he had exchanged with. Vertelko went on to see action in many of the battles as the Red Army pushed back the occupying forces. He was awarded the Medal "For Courage" after the liberation of Minsk, and went on to participate in the battles of the Vilnius offensive, resulting in the liberation of Molodechno, Borisov, Kaunas, and Vilnius.

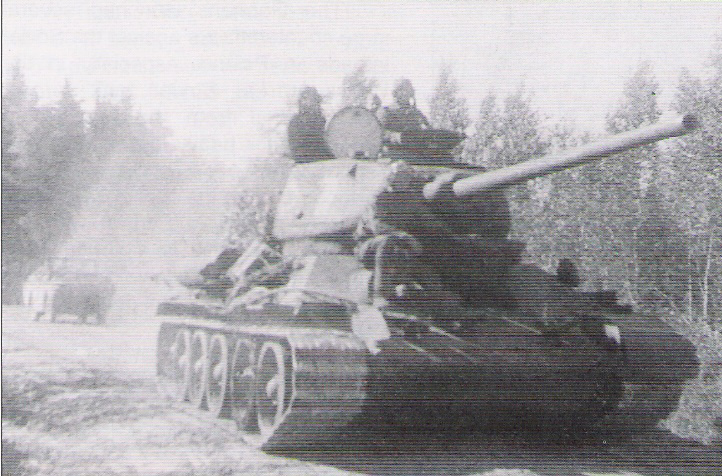
A Soviet T-34 tank. Vertelko became a tank crewmember during the last stages of the war.

He was subsequently wounded while defending against three German counter-attacks, losing a finger on his left hand, he was credited with killing 34 Germans, and was awarded the Order of the Red Star at the age of 17. A testimony from February 1944, signed by senior lieutenant Musin, noted that "Vertelko showed himself to be a brave reconnaissance warrior. While in a reconnaissance group ... he killed 34 German soldiers, for which he was presented with a government award - the Order of the Red Star. Disciplined. Outwardly presentable. Devoted to the cause of the party of Lenin-Stalin and the Socialist Motherland." In March 1945 he was transferred to the tank forces, as a crew member on a T-34 tank, replacing an injured loader. He was in Königsberg when the war ended.

== Postwar ==
Vertelko remained in the armed forces after the war, entering the 2nd Kazan Heavy Tank School in 1945, transferring with the school after its move to Ordzhonikidze, and then graduating in 1948, being promoted to the rank of lieutenant. He initially commanded a company of SU-152 self-propelled guns in Kartuz Bereza in the Byelorussian Soviet Socialist Republic, and then served as a staff officer to the deputy commander of the Belorussian Military District, Colonel-General Dmitry Mostovenko. It was during this time that Vertelko finally completed his secondary education, secretly graduating from the ninth grade of high school in 1954. In 1955 he enrolled in the Military Academy of the Armoured Forces. Though he passed the examinations, there was some question over his wartime injury of a missing finger, which initially caused his rejection by the selection committee. He was nevertheless later accepted, and graduated in 1958, taking up the post of chief of reconnaissance of a regimental headquarters, followed by deputy commander and then commander of a tank battalion. From 1963 he was deputy commander of a regiment. He was also appointed commander of a tank regiment of the 120th Guards Motor Rifle Division in 1963.

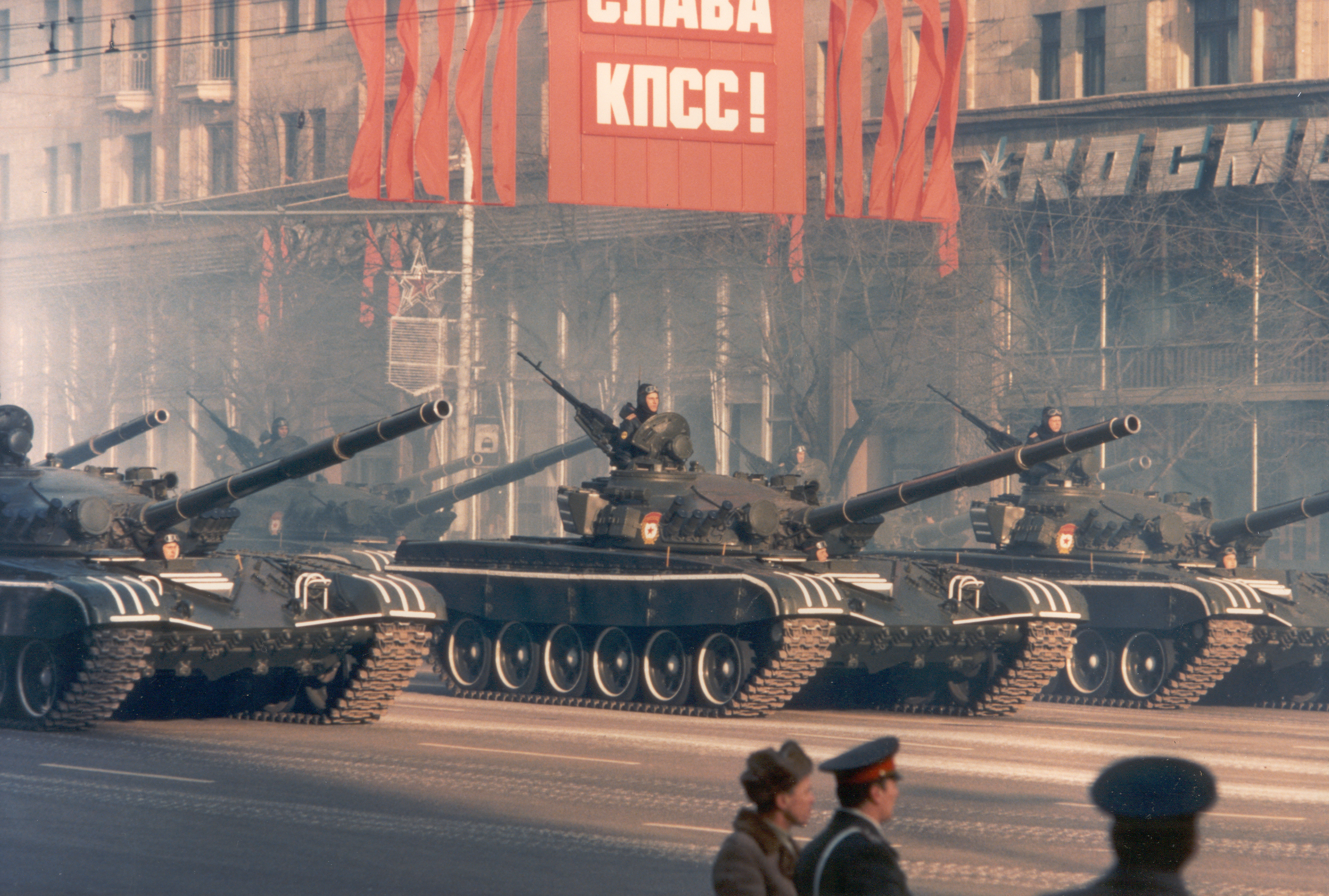
T-72 tanks, a mainstay of Soviet forces from the 1970s onwards. Vertelko oversaw the testing and acceptance of the tank into service, and oversaw their deployment in the units he was part of.

Vertelko carried out further studies by enrolling in the Military Academy of the General Staff in 1967. This was another academic course where Vertelko's participation was initially in doubt. The usual age limit was 40, and Vertelko was 41 when he came to apply. The objections were overruled after he participated in the 'Dnepr' exercises that year. Swift action by the forces under his command prevented his team's defeat, and Vertelko received the personal thanks of Defence Minister Andrei Grechko, a gold watch, and admission to the Academy. He duly graduated on 6 July 1969, becoming commander of the 3rd Guards Tank Division, in the Belorussian Military District. He was promoted to major general in 1970. In 1971 he took charge of the commission for testing the T-72 tank, and being convinced of its merits, pushed for its acceptance into service, a view which carried the day. In 1972 he became first deputy commander of the 5th Guards Tank Army. Success in this post led to him being tipped to become the army's commander, but in 1973 Vertelko made a surprise transfer to the Soviet Border Forces, which were part of the KGB.

== Border Forces service ==
The Sino-Soviet border conflict in 1969 had raised serious concerns in the Soviet leadership, and it was decided to reinforce the Soviet Border Forces with new and more powerful equipment, including artillery systems, tanks, infantry fighting vehicles, and armoured personnel carriers. Such measures required an experienced commander to implement them, and Vertelko was selected. Prior to taking up his post, Vertelko was summoned to meet with Yuri Andropov, the then chairman of the KGB. Andropov asked Vertelko's opinion on his appointment, to which Vertelko mentioned his concern that his arrival in the Border Forces would be like "a tank on the runway", and would disrupt the existing smooth operations of the forces. Andropov reassured Vertelko that he would have his support. Andropov and Vertelko would meet again several years later, after Andropov's rise to the position of General Secretary of the Communist Party, when Vertelko was receiving the Order of the Red Banner from Andropov at a ceremony in the Moscow Kremlin. Andropov remarked "And you still doubted, Comrade Vertelko, whether you were right to take up this business. Congratulations!"

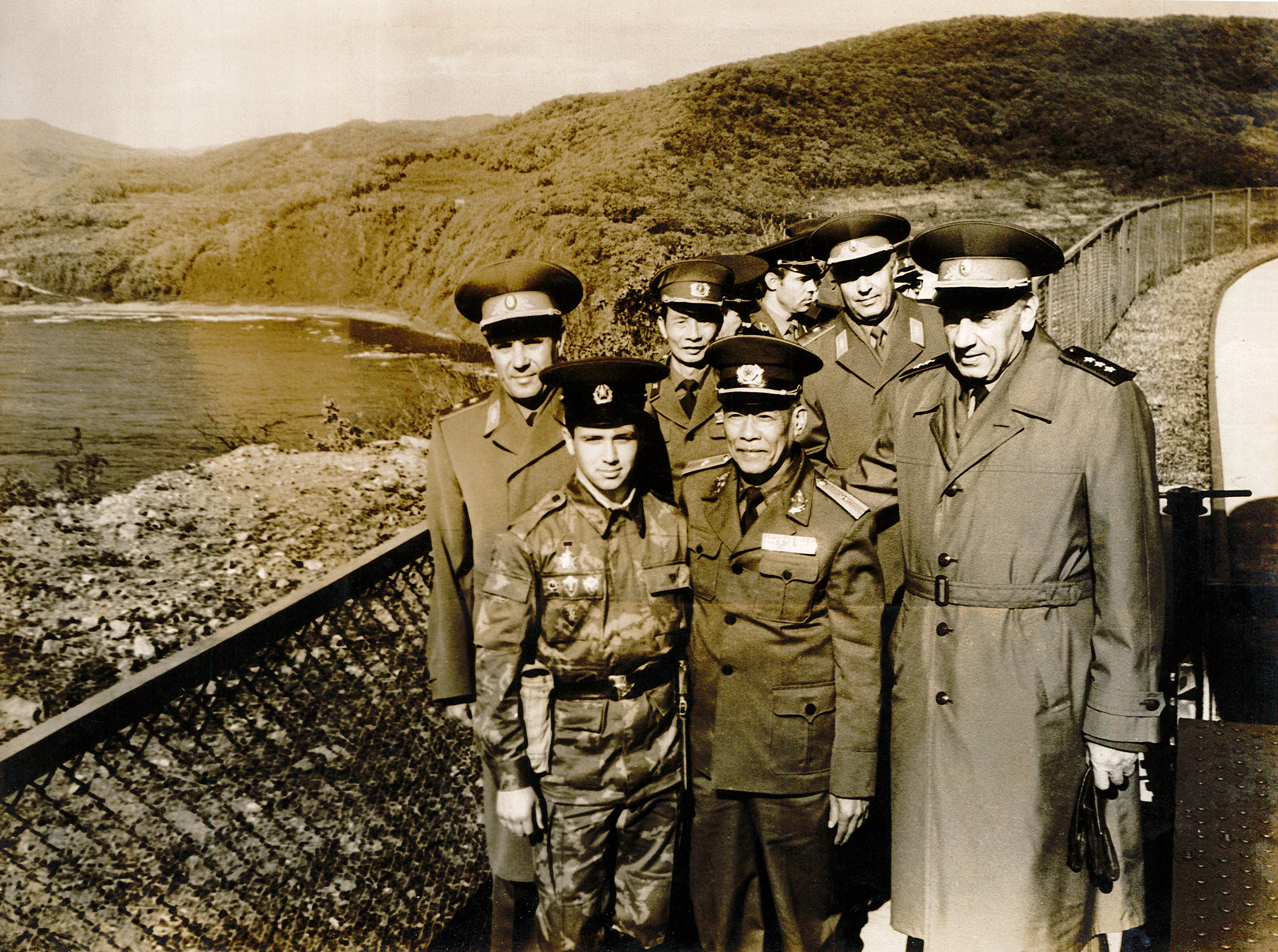
First row from left, excluding soldiers wearing camouflage clothing: Mikhail Barybin, Tam Le Thanh, and Ivan Vertelko at the Nakhodka Border Station on October 17, 1989.

Vertelko was initially deputy head of the Main Directorate for the Internal Affairs of the KGB, from 1973 until 1983. During this period he oversaw the deployment of the first units of the border force into northern Afghanistan in 1982, during the Soviet–Afghan War. He had seventy-five garrisons under his command as well as advisers among the Afghan border troops, six airborne assault groups and three air regiments. He spent nine years in Afghanistan, becoming first deputy head of the Main Directorate of the KGB in 1983, and serving as such until his retirement in 1990 with the rank of colonel general.

== Retirement ==
Ivan Vertelko retired in 1990 and settled in Moscow. He had suffered two serious illnesses, resulting in hospitalization, during the Soviet–Afghan War, which left him partially disabled. He wrote and published his memoirs, entitled Serving the Soviet Union, and was a member of the Union of Writers of Russia. He was a member of the "Alpha Centre" Fund for the Socio-Economic Rehabilitation of Employees and Veterans of Special Services and Law Enforcement Agencies, and participated in the events of the special forces community.

He was married to Anna Denisovna Vertelko, née Gnedko, who was born in 1926. Their daughter, Tamara Ivanovna Gladukhova, née Vertelko, was born in 1949. Ivan Vertelko died on 14 June 2021 at the age of 94. He was buried on 18 June 2021 at the Troyekurovskoye Cemetery.

== Honours and awards ==
Vertelko received many honors and awards throughout his career, including 54 different medals, eight domestic and four foreign medals. He was twice awarded the Order of Lenin, and also held the Order of the October Revolution, two Orders of the Red Banner, the Order of the Patriotic War First Class, the Order of the Red Banner of Labour, Order of the Red Star, awarded in 1944, and the Order "For Service to the Homeland in the Armed Forces of the USSR" Third Class. He also held four foreign orders and fifty-two medals. He was also awarded the titles of Honoured State Security Officer and Honoured Officer of the Ministry of Internal Affairs of the USSR.

At some point in the 1990s Vertelko was awarded the title of Hero of the Soviet Union by the Permanent Presidium of the Congress of People's Deputies of the Soviet Union. This award is considered unofficial and is not recognized by the Russian government. During the celebration of the 100th anniversary of the Soviet Army and Navy, Defender of the Fatherland Day, he was awarded the commemorative medal "100 Years of the Armed Forces" in 2018.
