= Colette Brull-Ulmann =

French physician (1920–2021)

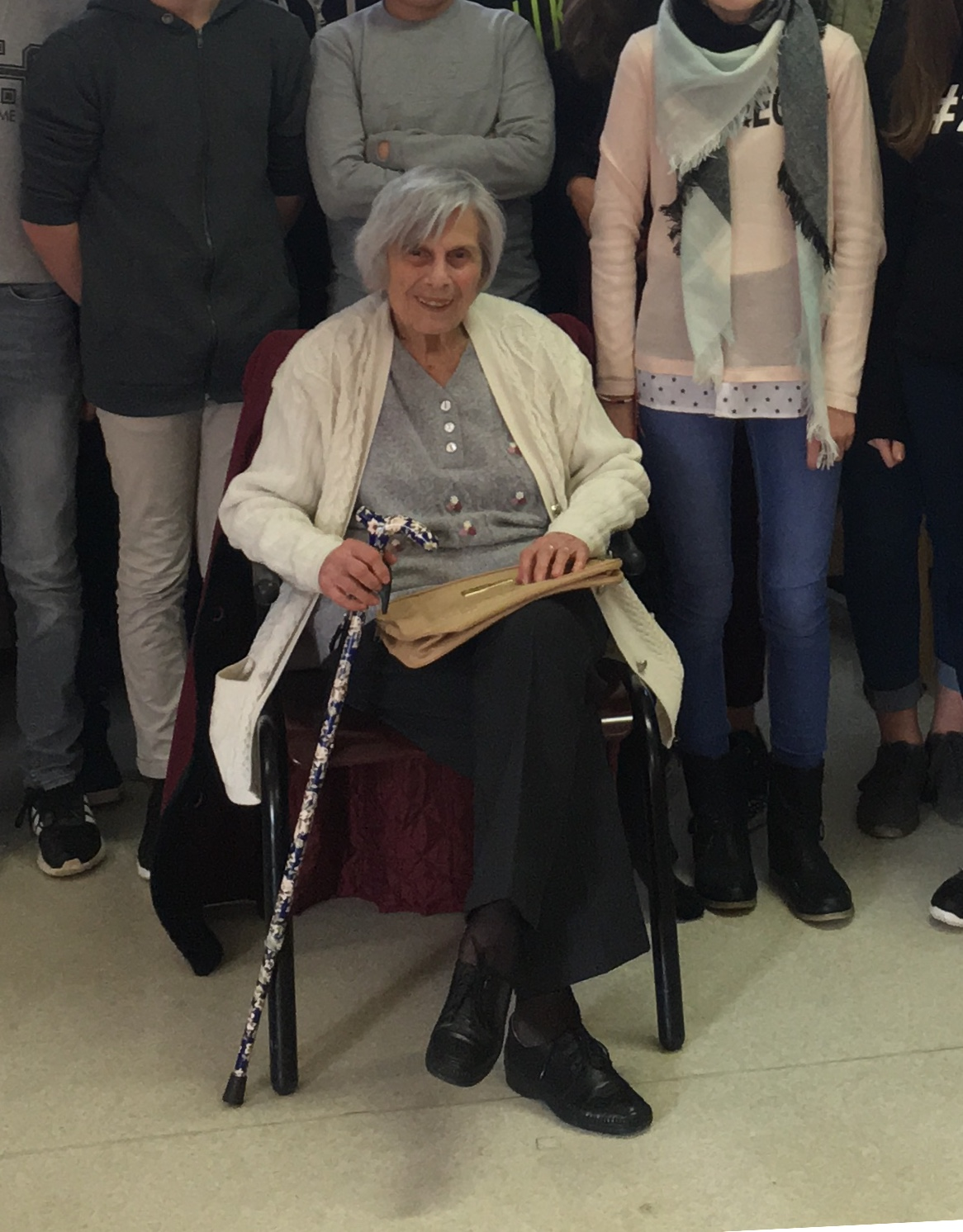
Colette Brull-Ulmann in 2018

Colette Brull-Ulmann (18 April 1920 – 22 May 2021) was a French Resistance fighter who worked at the Rothschild hospital in Paris during World War II and took part in the rescue of many Jewish children.

== Biography ==
Colette Brull was born as the second daughter of a Jewish family of four in Paris in 1920. In 1940, when aged 20 and while a medical student, she could not become an intern due to Vichy anti-Jewish legislation (October 1940). The only hospital in Paris where Jewish doctors have the right to exercise is the Rothschild Hospital in the 12th district she integrates in 1941. In 1941, she became a medical intern at the Rothschild hospital in the 12th arrondissement of Paris, the only hospital that did not then ban Jewish doctors from practising. Men from the Drancy internment camp were treated there, then after the “Vel' d'Hiv Roundup” in Paris on 16 July 1942, sick women and children. From July 1942, she actively participated in the Resistance and in the rescue of Jewish children hospitalized at the Rothschild Hospital, under the orders of Claire Heyman, a social worker at the hospital and organizer of the children's escape network.

In 1943, Brull-Ulmann was forced to flee the Rothschild Hospital and joined the Central Intelligence and Action Bureau, a spy service where she worked as an intelligence officer until the Liberation in 1945. After the war, she became a pediatrician in Noisy-le-Sec (Seinean-Saint-Denis), where she lived with her husband, Jacques-André Ulmann, a doctor and also resistance fighter and three children.

On 14 July 2019, aged 99, she was made an officer of the Legion of Honor. Colette Brull-Ulmann died at the age of 101 in May 2021.
