= Troyekurovskoye Cemetery =

Cemetery in western Moscow, Russia

- Троекуровское кладбище
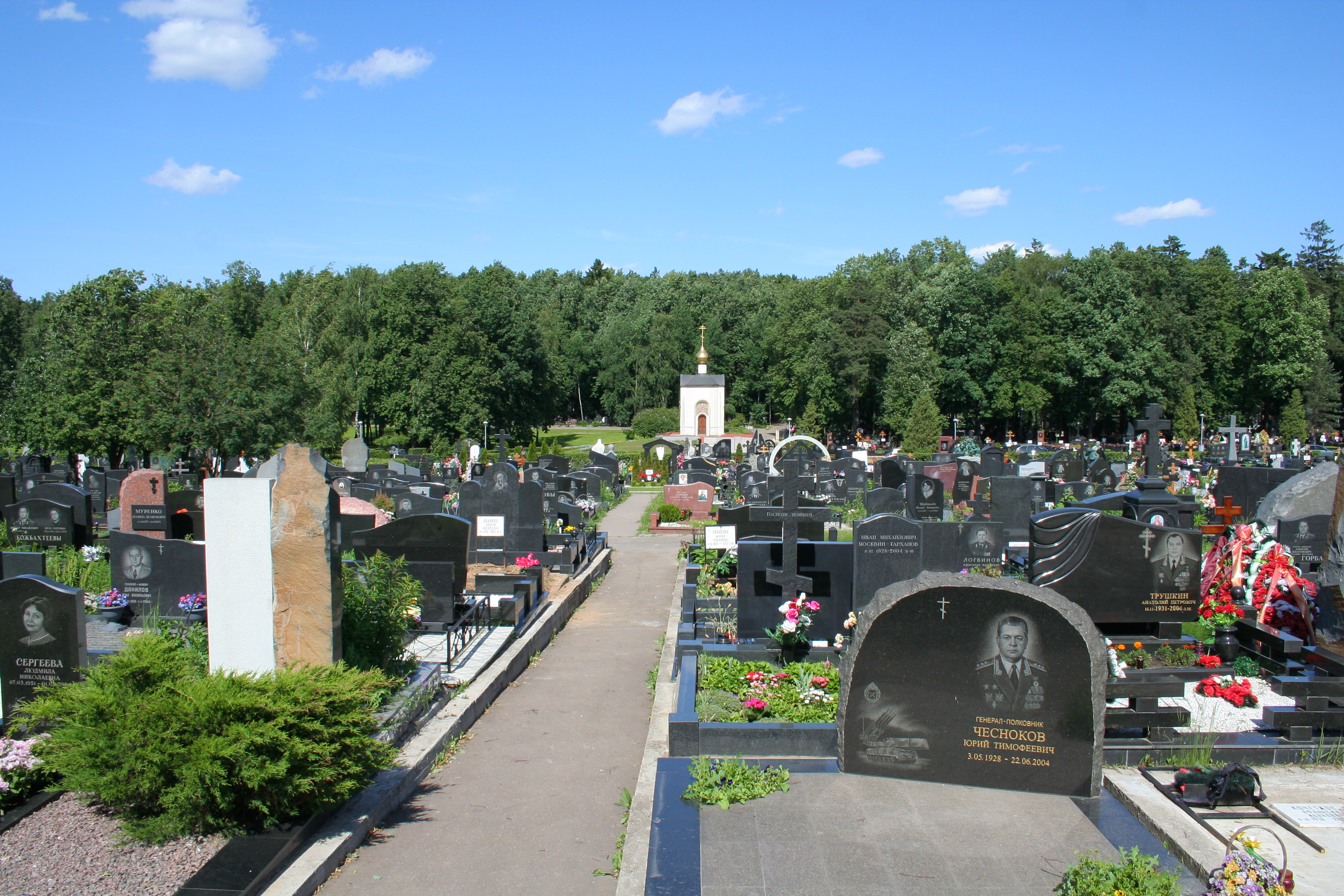
- Interactive map of Troyekurovskoye Cemetery

Details
- Established: 1962
- Location: Moscow
- Country: Russia
- Coordinates: 55°42′00″N 37°24′32″E
- Size: 33.72 hectares (83.3 acres)

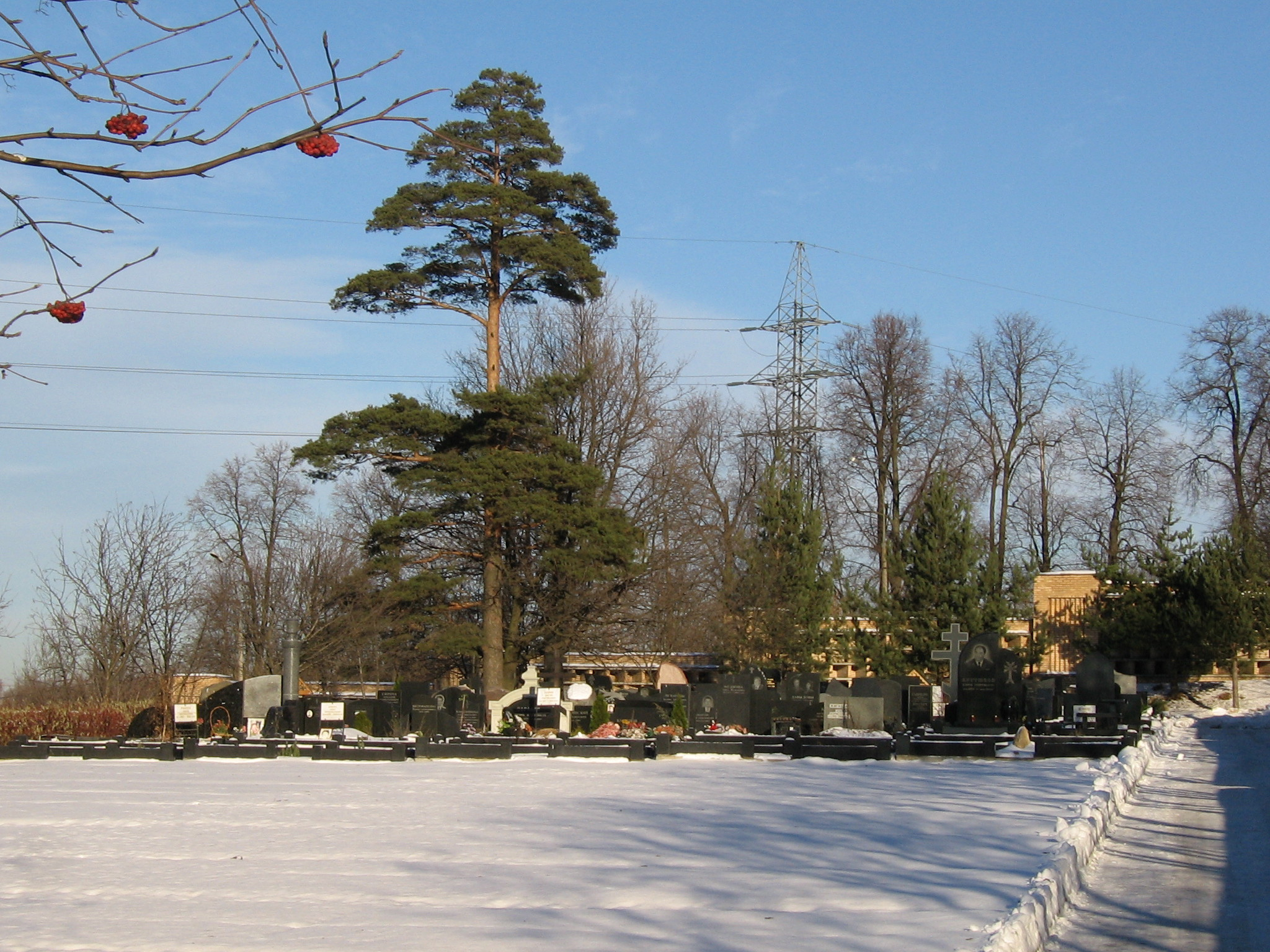
The Troyekurovo Cemetery

The Troyekurovo Cemetery (Russian: Троекуровское кладбище, romanized: Troyekurovskoye kladbishche), alternatively known as Novo-Kuntsevo Cemetery (Russian: Ново-Кунцевское кладбище, romanized: Novo-Kuntsevskoye kladbishche), is a cemetery in Moscow, Russia.

The cemetery is located in the former village of Troyekurovo on the western edge of Moscow, which derives its name from the Troyekurov princely family, a branch of the Rurikid House of Yaroslavl, that owned the village in the 17th century. Troyekurovo Cemetery includes the Church of Saint Nicholas, built by Prince Troyekurov in 1699–1704, which was closed during the Soviet era but reopened in 1991.

Troyekurovo Cemetery is administered as a branch of the Novodevichy Cemetery and is the resting place of numerous notable Russian and Soviet figures.

== Notable people buried at the Troyekurovo Cemetery ==
=== Notable graves ===
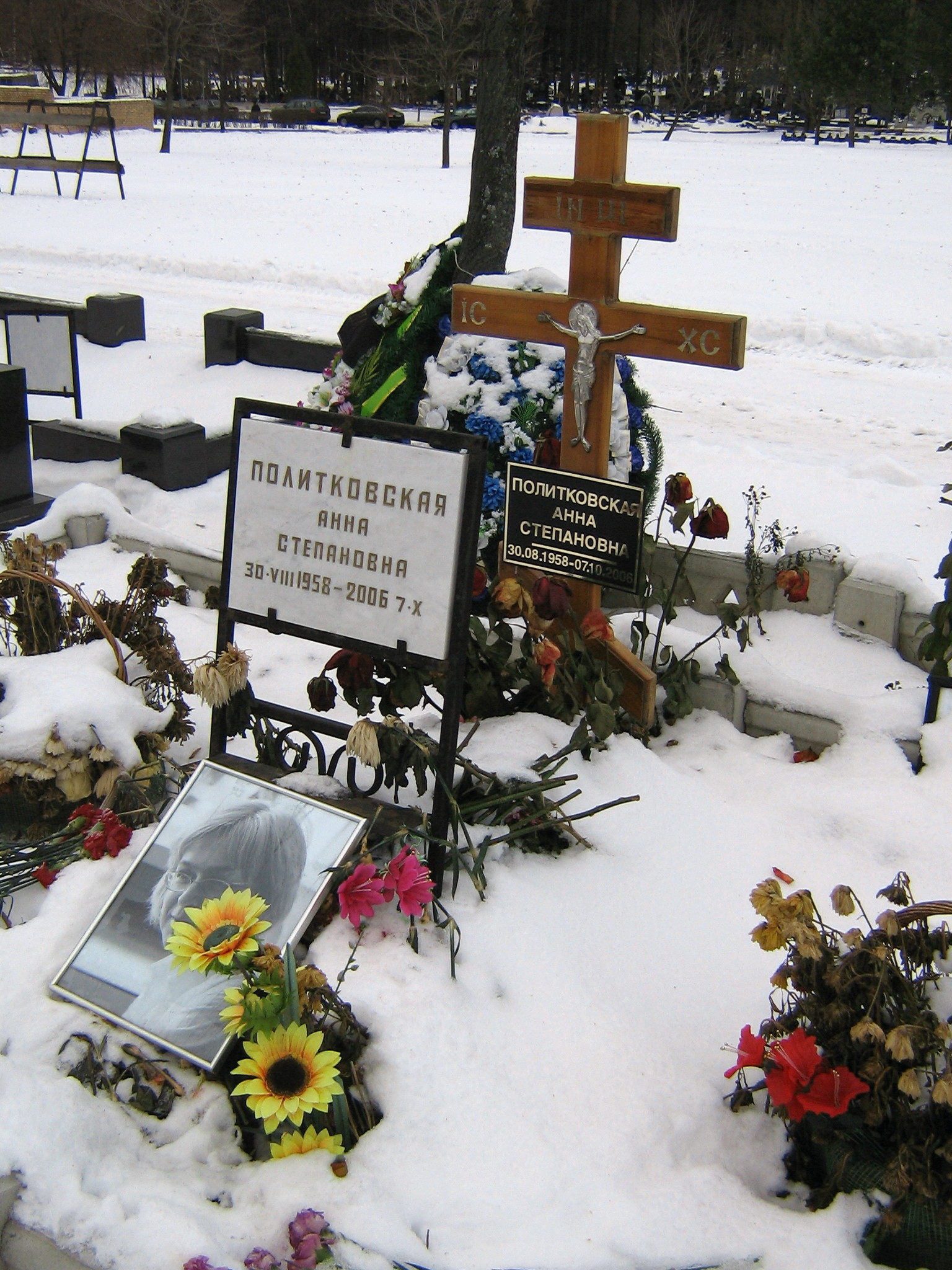
Anna Politkovskaya's grave

- Nina Alisova (1915–1996), Russian actress
- Gennady Bachinsky (1971–2008), Russian radio talk show host and producer
- Grigory Baklanov (1923–2009), Russian writer
- George Blake (1922–2020), Soviet spy who defected from the United Kingdom
- Alexei Bogomolov (1913–2009), radio engineer, Hero of Socialist Labour, Lenin Prize, USSR State Prize
- Viktor Bortsov (1934–2008), Soviet/Russian theatrical and cinema actor
- Yevgenia Dobrovolskaya (1964–2025), Russian actress
- Galina Dzhugashvili (1938–2007), Russian translator of French, granddaughter of Joseph Stalin
- Semyon Farada (1933–2009), Russian actor
- Konstantin Feoktistov (1926–2009), Russian cosmonaut
- Vladislav Galkin (1971–2010), Russian film actor
- Vasily Grossman (1905–1964), Soviet-era writer and journalist
- Natalya Gundareva (1948–2005), Russian actress
- Roman Abelevich Kachanov (1921–1993), Russian animator
- Dmitry Kholodov (1967–1994), journalist of the newspaper Moskovskij Komsomolets, killed as he was investigating alleged corruption among high ranks of the Russian military
- Elem Klimov (1933–2003), Soviet film director
- Vyacheslav Kochemasov (1918–1998), diplomat
- Andrey Kozlov (1965–2006), was the first deputy chairman of the Central Bank of the Russian Federation from 1997 to 1999 and again in 2002 to 2006
- Ilya Kormiltsev (1959–2007), Russian poet, translator, and publisher
- Konstantin Krylov (1967–2020), nationalist writer, journalist and philosopher
- Alfred Kuchevsky (1931–2000), Soviet professional ice hockey player
- Sergey Kurdyumov (1928–2004), specialist in mathematical physics, mathematical modeling, plasma physics, complexity studies and synergetic
- Mikhail Lapshin (1934–2006), President of the Altai Republic in Russia from 2002 to 2006
- Yuri Levada (1930–2006), Russian sociologist and political scientist
- Alexander Lenkov (1943–2014), Russian film, stage and voice actor.
- Eduard Limonov (1943–2020), Russian writer and political dissident, founder of the National Bolshevik Party
- Anatoly Lysenko (1937–2021), Russian television figure, journalist, director, producer.
- Sergey Mavrodi (1955–2018), MMM Leader
- Georgy Millyar (1903–1993), Russian film actor
- Yelena Mukhina (1960–2006), Soviet Gymnast.
- Yulia Nachalova (1981–2019), Russian singer and actor
- Gennady Nazarov (1967-2025), Russian actor
- Vyacheslav Nevinny (1934–2009), Russian actor
- Arsha Ovanesova (1906–1990), Soviet Armenian documentary film director, and screenplay writer.
- Galina Pisarenko (1934–2022), Soviet-born Russian soprano and teacher
- Anna Politkovskaya (1958–2006), murdered Russian journalist, author and human rights activist well known for her opposition to the Chechen conflict and Russian President Vladimir Putin
- Lyubov Polishchuk (1949–2006),actress
- Pavel Popovich (1930–2009), the 8th person in space
- Anatoly Pristavkin (1931–2008), Russian writer
- Yuli Raizman (1903–1994), Russian film director
- Boris Rybakov (1908–2001), Soviet archaeologist and historian
- Genrikh Sapgir (1928–1999), Russian poet
- Galina Savelyeva (1928–2022), Russian gynaecologist, Order of the Badge of Honour, Honoured Science Worker of the Russian Federation and Hero of Labour of the Russian Federation among others
- Daniil Shafran (1923–1997), Jewish Russian cellist
- Mikhail Shatrov (1932–2010), Soviet playwright
- Irina Shevchuk (1951-2026), Russian actress
- Vsevolod Shilovsky (1932-2025), Russian actor
- Vladimir Simonov, (1957-2025), Russian actor
- Natalia Shvedova (1916–2009), Russian lexicographer
- Sergei Suponev (1963–2001), TV host
- Valentina Tolkunova (1946–2010), Russian singer
- Yevgeny Vesnik (1923–2009), Russian actor
- Liliya Yudina (1929-2025), Russian actress
- Boris Zakhoder (1918–2000), Russian children's writer
- Sergey Zalygin (1913–2000), Russian novelist
- Anastasia Zavorotnyuk (1971–2024), Russian actress
- Agnia Aleksandrovna Kuznetsova (1911–1996), Russian writer
- Larisa Golubkina (1940–2025), Soviet and Russian actress
- Boris Grachevsky (1949–2021), the director of Eralash
- Aleksandr Dedyushko (1962–2007), Russian television actor
- Eduard Uspensky (1937–2018), Russian writer

=== Public and political figures ===
- Yegor Ligachyov (1920–2021), Second Secretary of the CPSU
- Yevgeny Bushmin (1958–2019), Russian economist, politician
- Anatoly Lukyanov (1930–2019), Chairman of the Supreme Soviet of the Soviet Union
- Ivan Silayev (1930–2023), Prime Minister of the Soviet Union
- Viktor Chebrikov (1923–1999), Soviet spy and head of the KGB from 1982 to 1988
- Vitaly Fedorchuk (1918–2008), Ukrainian Soviet administrator. He was chairman of the KGB in 1982. He then became the Soviet interior minister from 1982 until 1986
- Nikolai Ryzhkov (1929–2024), Prime Minister of the Soviet Union
- Boris Fyodorov (1958–2008), Russian economist, politician, and reformer
- Aleksandr Kamshalov (1932–2019), member of the Communist Party of the Soviet Union and head of the State Committee for Cinematography in the Soviet Union
- Andrei Kirilenko (1906–1990), leading official of the Communist Party of the Soviet Union in the 1960s, 1970s and early 1980s
- Gennady Kolbin (1927–1998), First Secretary of the Central Committee of the Communist Party of Kazakh SSR
- Nikolay Kruchina (1928–1991), top Soviet communist official, the administrator of affairs of the Central Committee
- Vladimir Kryuchkov (1924–2007), Soviet politician and leading figure in Communist Party of the Soviet Union and Chairman of KGB, dismissed in 1991 for his role in the failed August Coup against Soviet President Mikhail Gorbachev
- Anna Larina (1914–1996), third wife of Bolshevik leader Nikolai Bukharin, and author of memoirs about the Soviet Union and her 20 years spent imprisoned within the Gulag
- Pyotr Latyshev (1948–2008), Presidential Envoy to Urals Federal District, Russia
- Yuri Maslyukov (1937–2010), the last Gosplan chairman
- Boris Nemtsov (1959–2015), Russian opposition politician
- Boris Pugo (1937–1991), Latvian Communist political figure
- Vladimir Semichastny (1924–2001), Chief of the KGB from November 1961 to April 1967
- Georgy Shakhnazarov (1924–2001), Soviet politician and political scientist
- Larisa Shoygu (1953–2021), Russian politician, deputy of the State Duma (2007–2021)
- Anatoly Tyazhlov (1942–2008), Russian politician who served as the governor of Moscow Oblast from 1991 until 2000
- Alexander Yakovlev (1923–2005), Russian economist, chief of party ideology, sometimes called the "godfather of glasnost"
- Gennady Yanayev (1937–2010), the only vice president of the Soviet Union
- Valery Boldin (1935–2006), former Assistant Secretary to Mikhail Gorbachev

=== Military ===
- Sergey Akhromeyev (1923–1991), Hero of the Soviet Union (1982), Marshal of the Soviet Union (1983)
- Galaktion Alpaidze (1916–2006), Soviet lieutenant general and first director of the Plesetsk Cosmodrome
- Nikolai Amelko (1914–2007), Soviet admiral, commander of the Pacific Fleet
- Timur Apakidze (1954–2001), Russian major general, deputy commander of naval aviation and Hero of the Russian Federation
- Aleksey Botyan (1917–2020), Hero of the Russian Federation (2007), Second World War partisan and intelligence officer
- Vladimir Bogdashin (1952–2021), naval officer, rear admiral, captain of the frigate Bezzavetnyy during the 1988 Black Sea bumping incident.
- Yuri Drozdov (1925–2017), a high-level Soviet and Russian security official who oversaw the KGB's Illegals Program from 1979 to 1991.
- Vasily Dzhugashvili (1921–1962), general, son of Joseph Stalin and his second wife, Nadezhda Alliluyeva
- Anatoly Kosov (1927–1995), naval officer, vice-admiral, commander of the Baltic Fleet
- Natalya Meklin (1922–2005), World War II bomber pilot and Heroine of the Soviet Union
- Vladimir Muravyov (1938–2020), colonel general of the Strategic Missile Forces
- Yevdokiya Pasko (1919–2017), Heroine of the Soviet Union from the 46th Guards Night Bomber Aviation Regiment
- Aleksey Prokhorov (1922–2002), twice Hero of the Soviet Union, major-general
- Lev Rokhlin (1947–1998), Lieutenant-General in the Soviet and Russian armies
- Igor Sergeyev (1938–2006), Defense Minister of the Russian Federation from 1997 until 2001. He was the first and as of 2008 the only Marshal of the Russian Federation.
- Yevgeny Shaposhnikov (1942–2020), Marshal of Aviation, final Defence Minister of the Soviet Union
- Leonid Shcherbakov (1936–2021), Lieutenant-General, Hero of the Russian Federation
- Vladimir Sidorov (1924–2000), Admiral, commander of the Baltic and Pacific Fleets
- Boris Snetkov (1925–2006), Army General in the Soviet and Russian armies
- Lev Skvirsky (1903–1990), commander of the 26th Army
- Aleksandr Starovoitov (1940–2021), Army General, Hero of the Russian Federation
- Gennady Suchkov (1947–2013), admiral, commander of the Pacific and Northern Fleets
- Ivan Ustinov (1920–2020), Soviet general-lieutenant, counterintelligence officer
- Valentin Varennikov (1923–2009), Soviet General of the Army, Hero of the Soviet Union
- Ivan Vertelko (1926–2021), Soviet Colonel General
- Mikhail Vodopyanov (1899–1980), Soviet aircraft pilot, one of the first Heroes of the Soviet Union, and a Major General of the Soviet Air Force
- Mikhail Zaitsev (1923–2009), Soviet General of the Army, Hero of the Soviet Union
