= Louis M. Nuttman =

United States Army general (1874–1978)

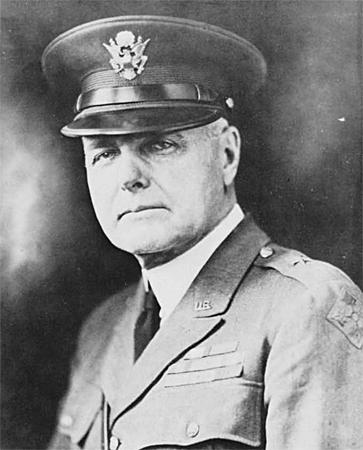
- Born: 28 January 1874; Newark, New Jersey, United States
- Died: 4 November 1978 (aged 104); San Francisco, California, United States
- Burial place: Arlington National Cemetery, Virginia, United States
- Military career
- Allegiance: United States
- Branch: United States Army
- Service years: 1895–1938
- Rank: Brigadier General
- Service number: 0-484
- Unit: Infantry Branch
- Commands: 18th Infantry Brigade; 22nd Infantry Brigade; 69th Infantry Brigade; New York Port of Embarkation; 22nd Infantry Regiment; 356th Infantry Regiment
- Conflicts: World War I; Battle of Saint-Mihiel; Meuse-Argonne Offensive
- Awards: Army Distinguished Service Medal; Silver Star (4)

Louis Meredith Nuttman (January 28, 1874 – November 4, 1978) was a high-ranking officer in the United States Army who served for over 43 years. A veteran of the Spanish–American War, the Philippine–American War, and World War I, he rose to the rank of brigadier general and was a recipient of the Army Distinguished Service Medal. At the time of his death at age 104, he was the oldest living graduate of the United States Military Academy.

== Early life and education ==
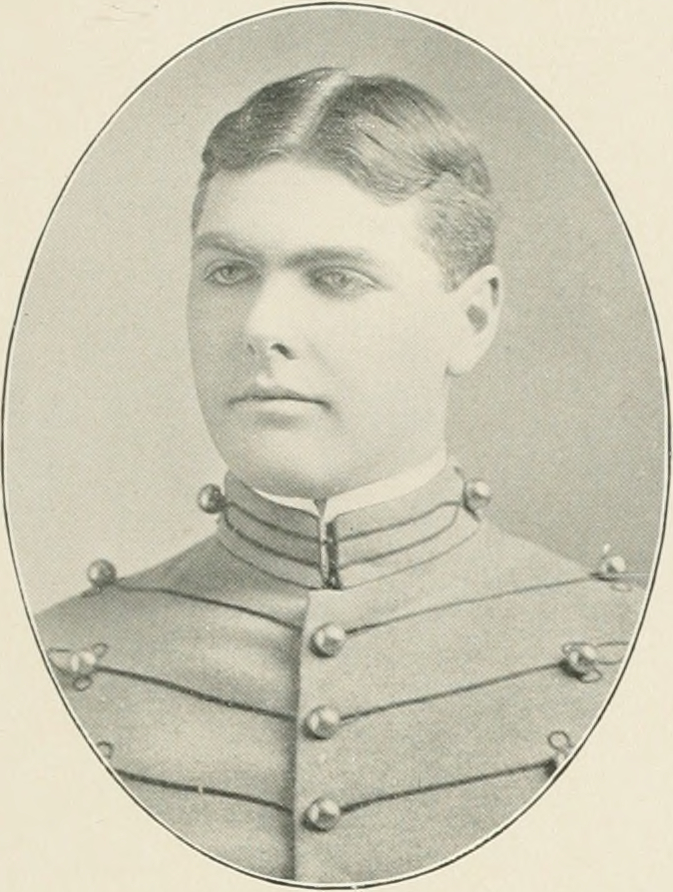
Nuttman as a United States Military Academy cadet c. 1895

Nuttman was born in New Jersey on January 28, 1874. He received an appointment to the United States Military Academy at West Point, entering on June 17, 1891. He graduated on June 12, 1895, ranking 31st in a class of 52 members. During his time at the academy, he demonstrated a strong aptitude for Spanish and English, though he found greater academic challenge in civil engineering and philosophy. Upon graduation, he was commissioned as a second lieutenant in the Infantry.

== Military career ==
=== Early conflicts ===
Nuttman saw extensive active service during the expansion of the United States as a global power. During the Spanish–American War, he participated in the Santiago de Cuba Campaign (June 22 – July 17, 1898), where he earned his first citation for gallantry. Following the war, he was deployed to the Philippines, serving with the 14th Infantry during the Philippine–American War.

In 1900, he accompanied the 14th Infantry to China as part of the China Relief Expedition during the Boxer Rebellion, earning a fourth citation for gallantry. He returned to the Philippines in late 1900 and continued to serve there intermittently until 1908, including participation in the Battle of Bayan in 1902.

=== World War I ===
During World War I, Nuttman held several key leadership positions. In August 1917, he was promoted to the temporary rank of colonel and assigned to the 89th Division. He commanded the 356th Infantry Regiment, where he was credited with providing his troops with the efficient training necessary for combat operations in France.

On October 1, 1918, he was promoted to the temporary rank of brigadier general. He later took command of the Combat Officer's Replacement Depot at Gondrecourt, where he demonstrated significant executive ability in organizing and administering the facility during the final stages of the war. For his "exceptionally meritorious and distinguished services," he was awarded the Army Distinguished Service Medal.

=== Post-war and later service ===
Following the war, Nuttman reverted to his permanent rank of colonel. He served as an instructor at the Infantry School at Fort Benning and later as Chief of Staff of the 2nd Infantry Division at Camp Travis, Texas. From July 1930 to January 1932, he commanded the 22nd Infantry Regiment at Fort McPherson, Georgia.

He was promoted to the permanent rank of brigadier general on May 1, 1932. His final assignments included commanding the 22nd Infantry Brigade at Schofield Barracks, Hawaii, and the 18th Infantry Brigade in Boston. He retired from active duty on January 31, 1938.

== Personal life and death ==
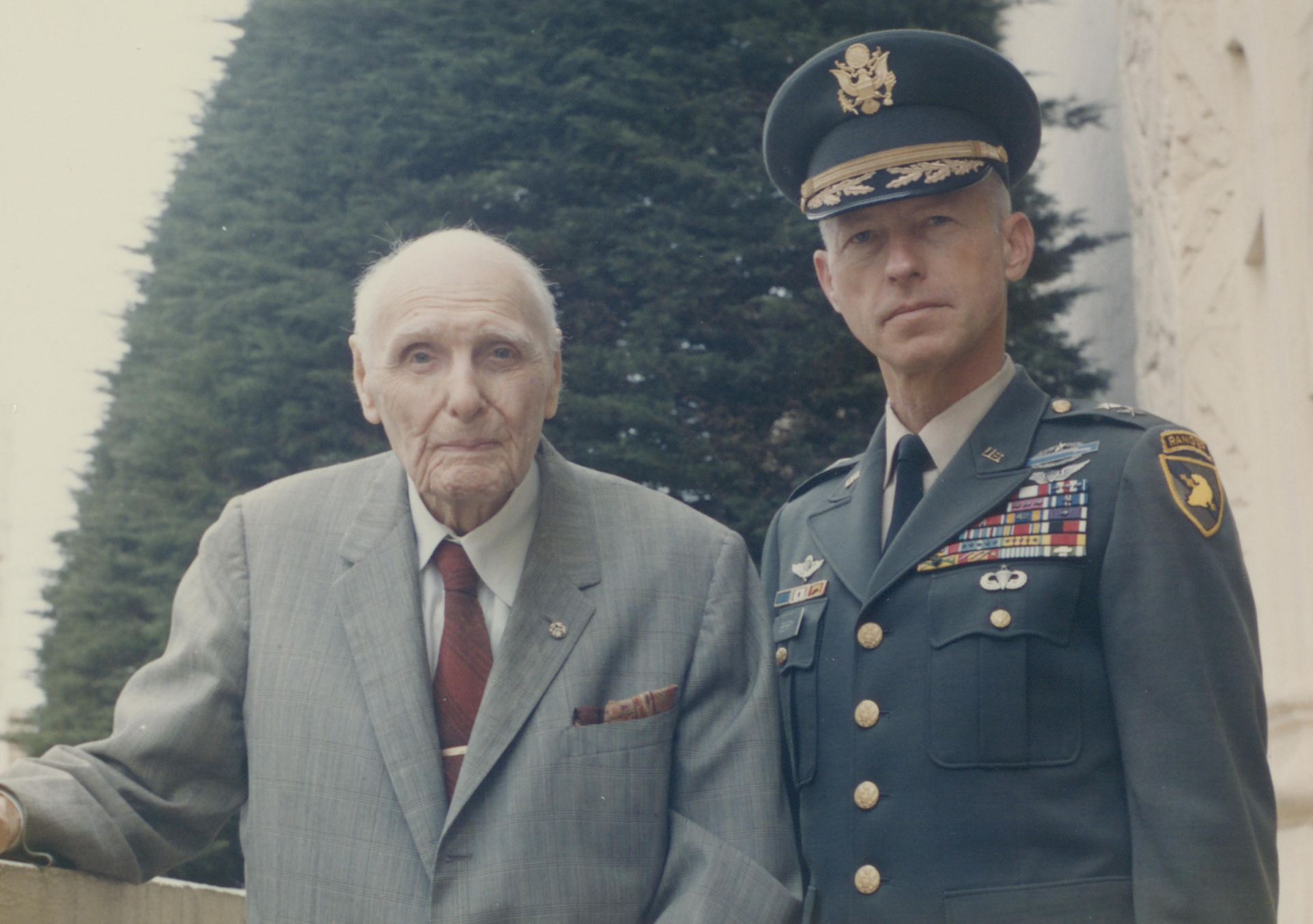
Nuttman (left) with United States Military Academy Superintendent Sidney B. Berry (right) on 2 October 1974

Nuttman lived a long retirement in San Francisco. He died on November 4, 1978, at the age of 104. At the time of his death in 1978, Nuttman was recognized as the oldest living graduate of the academy, a distinction that made him a prominent figure among the West Point Association of Graduates. He is buried at Arlington National Cemetery.

== Awards and decorations ==
Nuttman's decorations include:

- Army Distinguished Service Medal
- Silver Star (Four citations for gallantry, later converted to the Silver Star medal)
- Spanish Campaign Medal
- Philippine Campaign Medal
- China Relief Expedition Medal
- World War I Victory Medal
