= Li Guang (PLA general) =

Chinese military officer (1914–2020)

- 黎光
- Born: Li Guangyu (黎光裕); November 5, 1914; Yilong County, Sichuan, China
- Died: December 27, 2020 (aged 106); Nanjing, Jiangsu, China
- Education: Counter-Japanese Military and Political University; Nanjing Military Academy
- Spouse(s): Liu Dangping; Li Shuren
- Children: 7
- Military career
- Allegiance: Chinese Communist Party; China
- Branch: People's Liberation Army Ground Force
- Service years: 1932-2020
- Rank: Major general
- Conflicts: Second Sino-Japanese War; Chinese Civil War; Korean War
- Awards: Order of August the First (3rd Class Medal) (1955); Order of Independence and Freedom (2nd Class Medal) (1955); Order of Liberation (2nd Class Medal) (1955); Red Star Medal (1st Class)

Li Guang (Chinese: 黎光; pinyin: Lí Guāng; 5 November 1914 – 27 December 2020) was a founding major general (Shaojiang) of the People's Liberation Army (PLA) of China. He took part in the Red Army in 1933 and joined the Chinese Communist Party in 1935.

== Biography ==
Li was born Li Guangyu (黎光裕) into a poor family in Yilong County, Sichuan, on November 5, 1914. On August 23, 1933, the Chinese Red Army liberated the downtown Yilong County. After the Red Army liberated Li's hometown Xinzheng in early September, he had applied to join the army. At the age of 18, he was appointed a platoon leader of 2nd Company of the Independent Battalion and broke up a gang of bandits and landlords deep in the mountains. In October 1933, under the command of Chiang Kai-shek, Liu Xiang assaulted the Sichuan-Shaanxi revolutionary base, he fought with the Kuomintang army in Cangxi County and was wounded in the leg. At the end of March 1935, he participated in the Long March.

=== Second Sino-Japanese War ===
During the Second Sino-Japanese War, he was a company commander in 129th Division of the Eighth Route Army. He was wounded in the battle with the Japanese at Yangmingbao airport. He recuperated in Yan'an General Hospital for two months after a bullet went from his left jaw through right ear. After recovery, he entered the Counter-Japanese Military and Political University. In October 1938, he was sent to Jizhong Military Area in north China's Hebei province. He fought guerrilla wars with the Japanese army in the Baiyangdian area.

=== Chinese Civil War ===
After the surrender of Japan, Commander-in-chief Zhu De ordered Li to capture Zhangjiakou. On August 20, 1945, Zhangjiakou was occupied and the troops of Fu Zuoyi suffered a crushing defeat. Afterwards, he successively participated in the Battle of Zhengding, Battle of Wuchi, Battle of Zhengtai, Battle of Qingfengdian during the Chinese Civil War. In 1949, his troops took part in the siege of Fu Zuoyi after the liberation of Baoding.

=== PRC era ===
After the establishment of the Communist State, he was appointed division commander of the 198th Division of 66th Corps. Soon after, he was accepted by Nanjing Military Academy (now PLA Military Academy). In July 1952, the Chinese government commissioned him as division commander of 202nd Division of the 68th Corps. He was present at the Battle of Kumsong and Summer Offensive Campaign during the Korean War. After war, he was promoted to deputy commander of the 68th Corps. He attained the rank of major general (shaojiang) in 1955. In 1956, he was transferred to the coastal province Jiangsu and appointed commander of Lianyungang Fortress. He was division commander of 15th Division of the Wusongkou Garrison in 1958, and held that office until 1962. Since 1962 he successively served as deputy director and director of Engineering Command of the Nanjing Military Region. In 1978 he became a consultant of Nanjing Military Region.

=== Death ===
He died of illness in Nanjing, Jiangsu, on December 27, 2020, aged 106.

== Personal life ==
He was twice married. His first wife named Liu Dangping (刘荡平) and his second wife named Li Shuren (李淑仁). He had three sons and four daughters.

== Awards ==
- Order of August the First (3rd Class Medal) (1955)
- Order of Independence and Freedom (2nd Class Medal) (1955)
- Order of Liberation (2nd Class Medal) (1955)
- Red Star Medal (1st Class)
