= Ivan Ustinov =

Soviet and Russian intelligence officer (1920–2020)

- Native name: Иван Лаврентьевич Устинов
- Born: 1 January 1920; Malaya Bobrovka, Yekaterinburg Governorate, Russian SFSR
- Died: 15 January 2020 (aged 100) Moscow, Russia
- Buried: Troyekurovskoye Cemetery
- Allegiance: Soviet Union; Russia
- Branch: NKVD; SMERSH; MGB; MVD; KGB
- Service years: 1939–1991
- Rank: General-Lieutenant
- Commands: Third Directorate of the KGB; Office of Special Divisions of the KGB for the Group of Soviet Forces in Germany
- Awards: Order of Honour; Order of the Red Banner (twice); Order of the Red Star (three times); Order of the Patriotic War First class Medal "For Courage"; Medal "For Battle Merit"

Ivan Lavrentevich Ustinov (Russian: Иван Лаврентьевич Устинов; 1 January 1920 – 15 January 2020) was a Soviet intelligence officer who held a number of posts in Soviet military counterintelligence, reaching the rank of general-lieutenant.

Born in 1920, Ustinov joined the Red Army in 1939 and was assigned to serve in the state's security organs. He had begun his operational studies two weeks before the Axis invasion of the Soviet Union, and was soon in service in the front lines. He saw action at the Battle of Smolensk and the fighting around Vyazma, having to escape encirclement before he could rejoin the Soviet forces. He served on several of the fronts during the Second World War, as part of the detachments of NKVD and SMERSH operatives assigned to army groupings. By the end of the war he was head of a SMERSH detachment with a regiment, and during the 1950s was part of military counterintelligence assigned to the Group of Soviet Forces in Germany, as part of the Ministry of State Security (MGB), and its successors the Ministry of Internal Affairs (MVD), and finally the Committee for State Security (KGB).

Ustinov then served in various positions with the KGB's Third Directorate in the 6th Guards Tank Army, and the Far Eastern Military District, eventually becoming deputy head and then head of the KGB's entire Third Directorate, effectively leading the Soviet Union's military counterintelligence. His final active posting was a return to the Soviet Forces in Germany as Head of the KGB's Special Directorate there. In the KGB's reserve after 1981, he served as advisor to the chairman of Gosplan on security issues until his retirement in 1991.

In retirement Ustinov published on the subject of the history of military counterintelligence, took part in anniversary events and was a consultant on documentary films. He had received a number of honours and awards over his career, and died in 2020, shortly after his 100th birthday.

== Early life and wartime service ==
Ustinov was born on 1 January 1920 in the village of Malaya Bobrovka, then part of Yekaterinburg Governorate, in the Russian SFSR, USSR. He attended the Irbitsky feldsher-obstetric school, graduating in August 1938 and being assigned to work in the NKVD's North Ural forced labour camp. He joined the Red Army in November 1939. Assigned to the state's security organs, he began the course of operational studies at the NKVD's school in Mogilev on 10 June 1941, less than two weeks before the outbreak of war.

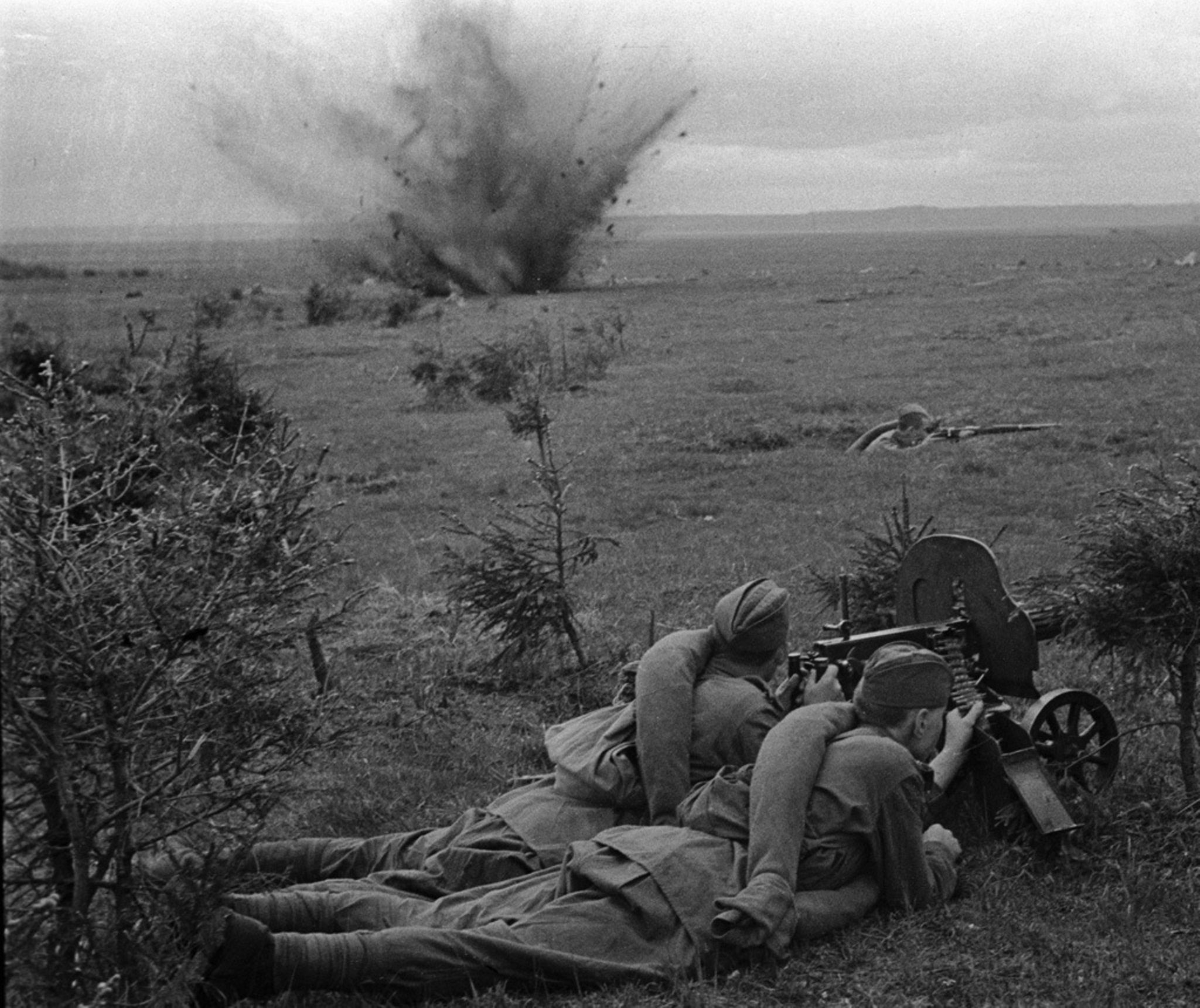
Soviet forces in action during the fighting around Smolensk in 1941. Ustinov was involved in the fighting, narrowly escaping encirclement and capture.

With the Axis invasion of the Soviet Union that month, Ustinov was deployed on the Western Front. He was assigned to the 6th Cavalry Division, then at Białystok, but with the rapid advance of enemy forces, found himself cut off and unable to reach his unit. He returned to Mogilev and was placed with the reserve personnel. He subsequently saw action at the Battle of Smolensk, and at the fighting around Vyazma. During the engagements Ustinov's detachment was one of the many trapped by German encirclement. The detachment was eventually able to break through the encirclement and withdraw to safety, a fact the commander of the assembly point credited to Ustinov's actions. Ustinov later recalled how he greeted the men with "Comrades, I'm from military counterintelligence! Now we will organize and make a breakout. I checked: it will be possible to break through here. If someone is scared and wants to surrender, I will shoot him with the power given to me by the Motherland!" Later in the war he saw action with the 11th Guards Army as part of the NKVD Special Division, taking part in the offensives in Operation Kutuzov in 1943, and Operation Bagration in 1944. From April 1944, he was the head of SMERSH detachment with the 83rd army field evacuation point, and from January 1945, the head of SMERSH of the 3rd detachment of a separate tank regiment of the 3rd Belorussian Front. He was credited with the exposure of over 20 Abwehr agents.

== Postwar ==
From November 1945 Ustinov was deputy head of the SMERSH detachment for the 36th Guards Rifle Corps in the Baltic Military District. Further postings in the 1950s were primarily with the Group of Soviet Forces in Germany. In April 1951 he became Deputy Head of the 3rd Division of the Second Main Directorate of the Ministry of State Security (MGB) for the Soviet Forces in Germany, holding the post until November 1952, when he became Secretary of the Directorate's Party Committee, followed by the Secretary of the Party Committee for the Directorate of Special Divisions in the Ministry of Internal Affairs (MVD) for Soviet Forces in Germany from March 1953 until March 1954. He continued to hold the post after the MVD was replaced by the Committee for State Security (KGB) that month, and in December 1954 became Head of the KGB's 3rd Department for the Soviet Forces in Germany. Ustinov held this post until January 1957, when he returned to the Soviet Union as Deputy Head of the KGB's military counterintelligence section in the 69th Air Army.

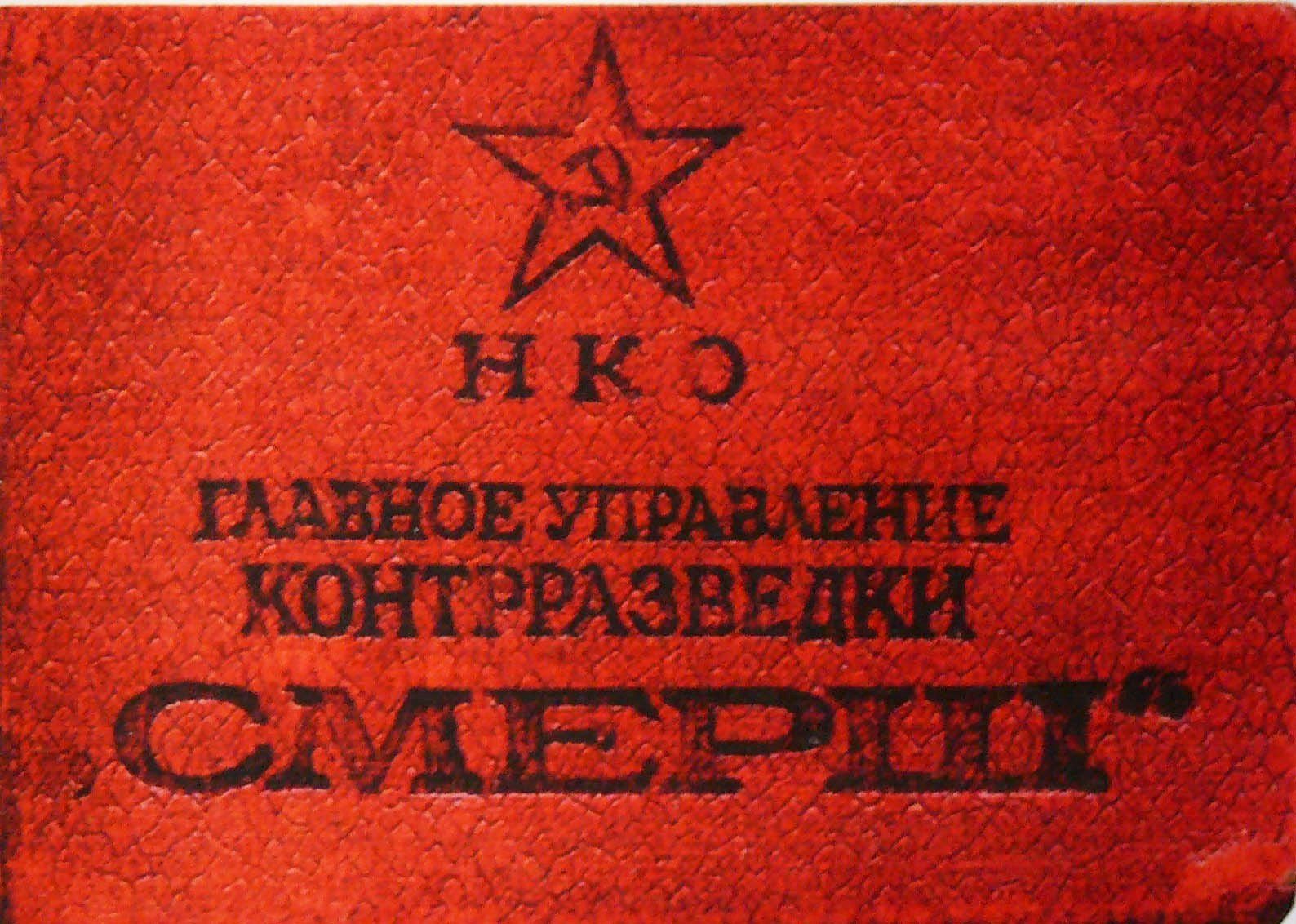
Certification for a SMERSH agent. Ustinov's career was spent with the various military counterintelligence organs, including the NKVD, SMERSH, the MGB, MVD, and KGB.

Ustinov's next post was as head of the KGB's military counterintelligence section of the 6th Guards Tank Army between August 1958 and July 1963, after which he became Deputy Head of the KGB's Special Directorate for the Far Eastern Military District until 1966. In August that year he became head of the directorate, holding the post until February 1968. He was during this time promoted to the rank of major general on 20 December 1966. In February 1968 Ustinov was appointed Deputy Head of the KGB's Third Directorate, holding the position until becoming head of the directorate on 4 September 1970, effectively leading the Soviet Union's military counterintelligence. Promoted to general-lieutenant on 15 June 1971, Ustinov was next appointed Head of the KGB's Special Directorate for the Soviet Forces in Germany from November 1973 until July 1981. He was then transferred to the KGB's reserve and served as advisor to the chairman of Gosplan on security issues until Ustinov's retirement in September 1991.

== Retirement ==
In retirement Ustinov wrote and published on the subject of the history of military counterintelligence. His book Strengthened by Steel was published in 2005, and reprinted in 2008 as At the Frontier of Historical Change. He was a regular contributor of articles on wartime and postwar military counterintelligence in a number of journals. He took part in many anniversary events relating to the security organs, or wartime victories, and was frequently a consultant on documentary films, including Military Counterintelligence: The Invisible War, Operation Aryans, and Operation Mole. In 2013 People's Artist of the USSR Alexandr Shilov painted Ustinov's portrait.

Ustinov died in Moscow on 15 January 2020, aged 100. His funeral took place on 17 January, and he was buried in the Troyekurovskoye Cemetery.

Ustinov had received a number of awards and honours over his career. He was twice awarded the Order of the Red Banner, on 30 October 1967 and 31 December 1976; as well as three Orders of the Red Star, on 30 April 1944, 5 November 1954 and 6 May 1985; the Order of the Patriotic War First Class on 11 March 1985; as well as the Medals "For Courage", "For the Defence of Moscow", "For the Capture of Königsberg" and "For the Victory over Germany in the Great Patriotic War 1941–1945". He also held 17 awards from foreign states. In 1969 he was given the title of Honoured State Security Officer, and in 2010 he was awarded the Order of Honour by the Russian Federation. Shortly before his death he was awarded the Russian Federation Presidential Certificate of Honour.
