= Aleksey Botyan =

Soviet and Russian intelligence officer (1917–2020)

- Алексей Николаевич Ботян
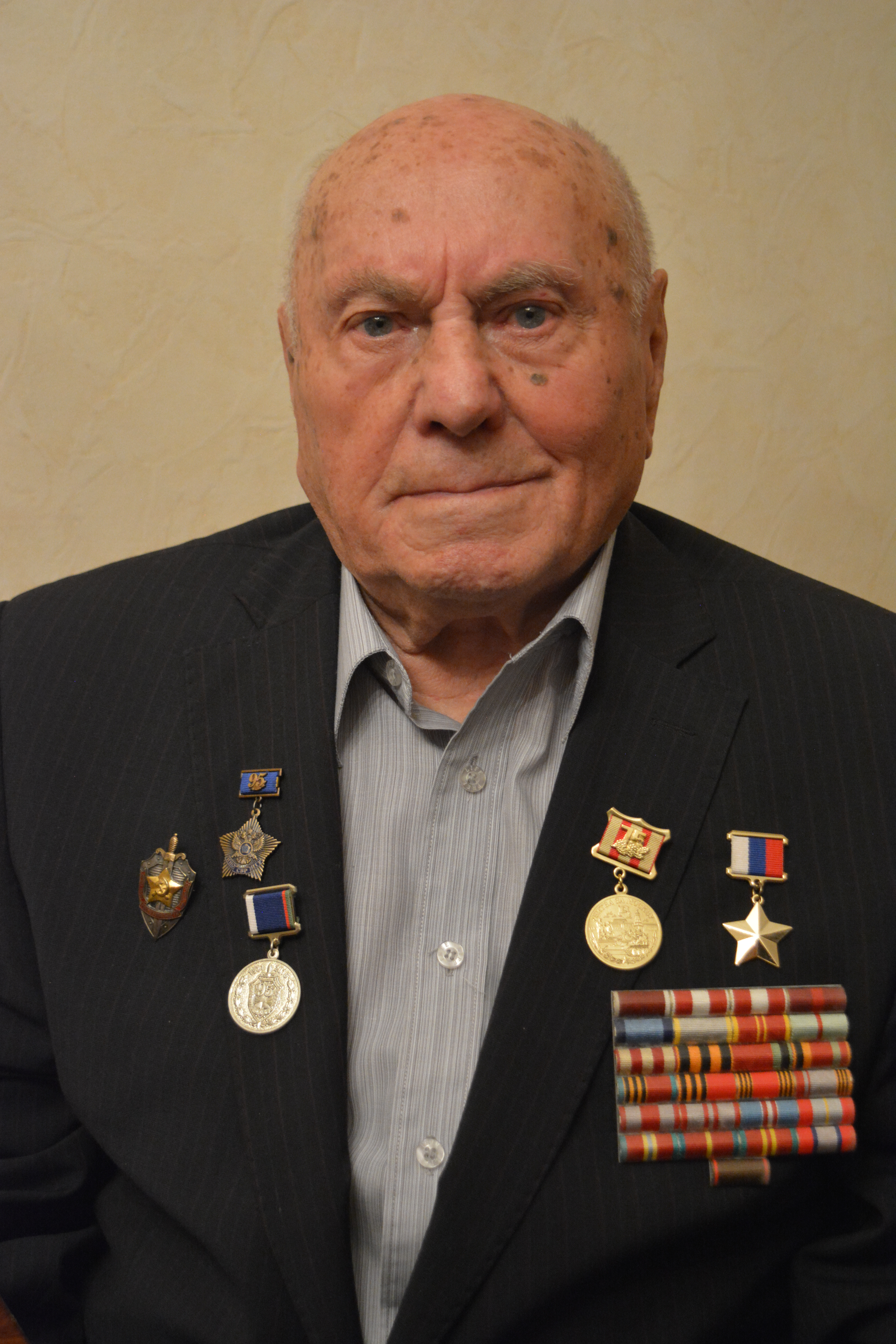
- Botyan in 2016
- Born: 10 February 1917; Chertovichi, Vilna Governorate, Russian Empire
- Died: 13 February 2020 (aged 103); Moscow, Russia
- Burial place: Troyekurovskoye Cemetery
- Military career
- Allegiance: USSR; Russia
- Service years: 1939–1989
- Rank: Colonel of State Security
- Awards: Hero of the Russian Federation; Order "For Merit to the Fatherland" Fourth Class; Order of Courage; Twice Order of the Red Banner; Order of the Patriotic War; Order of the Red Banner of Labour; Medal "For Battle Merit"; Medal "To a Partisan of the Patriotic War"; Medal "For the Defence of Moscow"; Medal "For the Victory over Germany in the Great Patriotic War 1941–1945"; Medal "For Impeccable Service" First and Second Classes; Silver Cross of the Virtuti Militari

Aleksey Nikolayevich Botyan (also transliterated Alexei Botian; Russian: Алексе́й Никола́евич Ботя́н; 10 February 1917 – 13 February 2020) was a Soviet and Russian spy and intelligence officer. He was awarded the title of Hero of the Russian Federation in 2007 for his role in protecting the Polish city of Kraków from destruction by the Nazis in January 1945.

Botyan died in Moscow on 13 February 2020, at the age of 103. President of Russia Vladimir Putin offered his condolences in an official message, stating "The legendary scout, a strong, extraordinary personality, passed away. He was the leader and participant in brilliant special operations, which became an important contribution to the Great Victory and are forever inscribed in domestic and world history." Botyan was buried with military honours in the Alley of Heroes in the Troyekurovskoye Cemetery on 17 February.

== See also ==
- List of Heroes of the Russian Federation
