= DeWitt Searles =

United States Air Force major general (1920–2021)

DeWitt R. Searles
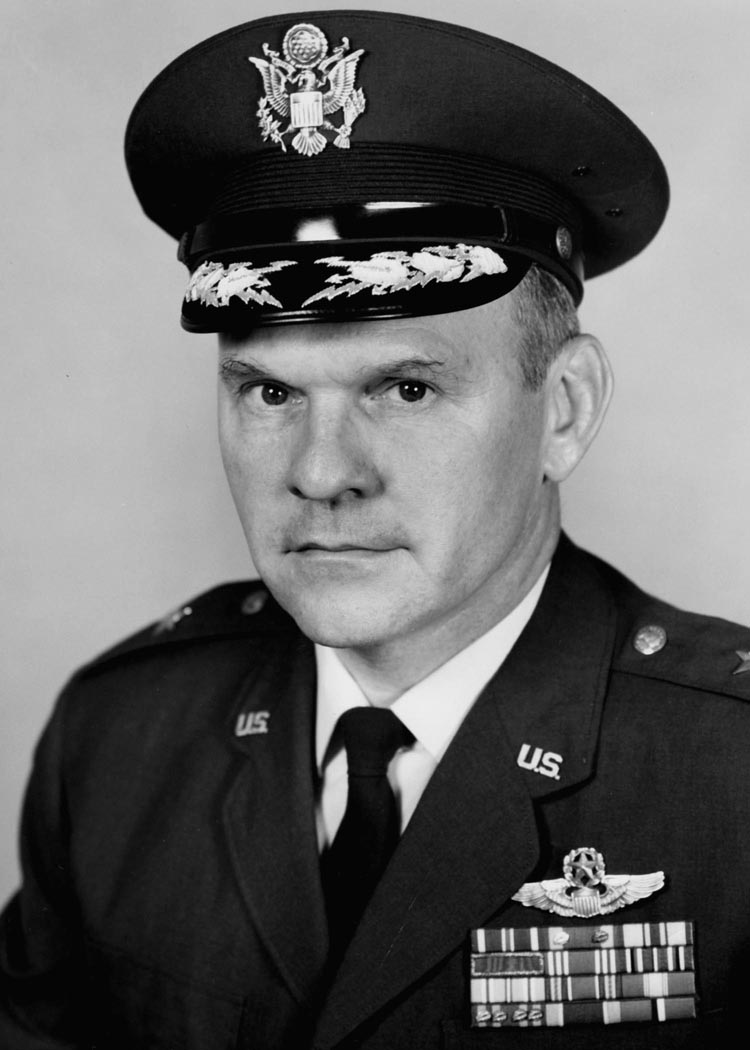
- Born: August 7, 1920; Birmingham, Alabama U.S.
- Died: February 27, 2021 (aged 100); Virginia, U.S.
- Military career
- Allegiance: United States
- Branch: United States Air Force
- Service years: 1943–1974
- Rank: Major general
- Conflicts: World War II

DeWitt Richard Searles (August 7, 1920 – February 27, 2021) was a major general in the United States Air Force who served as Deputy Inspector General of the Air Force from 1972 to 1974. He graduated from the former Bolles Military Academy in 1939. He died in Virginia in February 2021 at the age of 100.
