= James Flint (RAF officer) =

- Born: 24 May 1913; Nottingham, England
- Died: 16 December 2013 (aged 100)
- Military career
- Allegiance: United Kingdom
- Branch: Royal Air Force
- Service years: 1938–1945
- Rank: Wing Commander
- Nicknames: Jim; Jimmy
- Service number: 714968 (airman); 121331 (officer)
- Commands: No. 50 Squadron RAF
- Conflicts: World War II
- Awards: Distinguished Flying Cross; George Medal; Distinguished Flying Medal; Air Efficiency Award

Wing Commander James Flint, DFC, GM, DFM, AE (24 May 1913 – 16 December 2013) was a British businessman and decorated Royal Air Force officer. During active service in World War II, he gained the unique distinction of receiving two gallantry awards for separate actions during the same operation.

== Early life ==
Flint was born on 24 May 1913 in Nottingham, England. He was one of four children of William and Edith Flint. He was educated at Trent Bridge Central School. He left school at 14 and began work. However, the company soon went bust and he was offered a job by the company that undertook the liquidation. He then trained as an accountant with the firm, R. A. Page.

== Military service ==
In August 1938, he joined the Royal Air Force Volunteer Reserve and was accepted for pilot training. When World War II broke out in September 1939, he was called up for full-time service and continued his pilot training at RAF Tollerton and RAF Brize Norton. In January 1941, he completed pilot training and received his wings. He was posted to No. 49 Squadron RAF, based at RAF Scampton, as a sergeant pilot in February 1941. His first mission was not as a pilot but as a navigator. He had volunteered to fill in for the original navigator who had fallen ill. As a pilot, he flew missions that were attacks against targets in Nazi Germany.

Flint was awarded the George Medal (GM) and the Distinguished Flying Medal (DFM) for actions that occurred on the same flight in an Handley Page Hampden, on the night of 5/6 July 1941. He was awarded an immediate DFM for his 'cool courage and determination to strike at the enemy' during the flight. On 7 November 1941, he was awarded the George Medal.

One night in July 1941, this airman was captain and pilot of an aircraft which was attacked by two enemy aircraft whilst over the sea about 50 miles from the English Coast. As a result of the damage sustained, Sergeant Flint was later compelled to descend on the water 800 yards from the shore. The wireless operator and air gunner were able to leave the aircraft but there was no sign of the navigator. Sergeant Flint was unable to open the astro hatch so he lowered the back of the pilot's seat, crawled through the aperture, and found the navigator, who had been badly wounded, helpless behind a spar where he had fallen. The aircraft was fast sinking but Sergeant Flint managed to drag the navigator out through the pilot's hatch. The dinghy had been punctured and, being only partially inflated, sunk at once with the aircraft. The air gunner, though wounded, swam towards the shore and Sergeant Flint, at first assisted by the wireless operator until his wounds prevented him from continuing, supported the helpless navigator until they were within 50 yards of the shore where a soldier who had come out to render assistance relieved him. Sergeant Flint then swam to the shore where, after seeing both the wireless operator and navigator safe and finding no sign of the air gunner, he asked for boats to be sent out to search for the missing man, at the same time giving clear instructions where to look for him. He would not leave the beach until he had seen that boats were searching for the air gunner who, it was subsequently found, must have succumbed to his wounds shortly after striking out for the shore. Sergeant Flint then walked for over a mile to a waiting ambulance and was taken to hospital. This airman displayed great gallantry and disregard for personal safety in his efforts to save the helpless navigator who, unfortunately, has since died of his wounds.

— George Medal citation, The London Gazette 4 November 1941.

Flint's tour ended in September 1941 and he was rested from flight operations serving on the ground as an airfield controller. He was a flight sergeant when he was offered a commission for the second time. Having accepted, he was commissioned on 1 May 1942 into the General Duties branch of the Royal Air Force Volunteer Reserve as a pilot officer (emergency). He spent the next two years at a bomber training unit as an instructor. He was promoted to flying officer (war substantive) on 1 November 1942. He was promoted flight lieutenant on 12 November 1942. In 1944, he converted to the Lancaster Bomber and was posted to No. 50 Squadron RAF as commanding officer. His squadron flew as air support during the Normandy Landings of June 1944. He was promoted to squadron leader (war substantive) on 11 June 1945. He commanded No. 50 Squadron RAF until the end of the war, having undertaken 20 sorties with them.

On 23 March 1945, he was awarded the Distinguished Flying Cross (DFC). Flint was demobbed in 1945. On 24 May 1958, he was allowed to retain the rank of wing commander.

== Later life ==
After being demobilised in 1945, Flint took up employment with a sports outfitters and suppliers, Redmayne and Todd. He then became a representative and director of a hairdressing equipment company, which he worked for until his retirement in 1978.

Flint died on 16 December 2013, aged 100.
