= Eugene Vielle =

British Royal Air Force officer (1913–2015)

Eugene Vielle OBE
- Born: 23 April 1913; Lambeth, London, England
- Died: 2 April 2015 (aged 101)
- Military career
- Allegiance: United Kingdom
- Service years: 1932–1957
- Rank: Group Captain
- Conflicts: World War II
- Awards: Order of the British Empire (OBE) 1939–1945 Star; War Medal 1939–1945

Eugene Emile "Tubby" Vielle OBE (29 April 1913 – 2 April 2015) was a Royal Air Force (RAF) officer who was involved in the development of new navigation and bombing systems during World War II. Vielle believed that his ideas for the "Vielle Bombing System" with a television camera in the nose, developed after the war, was the basis of the development of the cruise missile. It was reported by the Wiltshire Times that he flew as many as 150 different types of aircraft during his career.

== Early life ==
Eugene Emile Vielle was born on 29 April 1913 in the Lambeth district of London. His early education was at Dulwich College.

== Royal Air Force ==
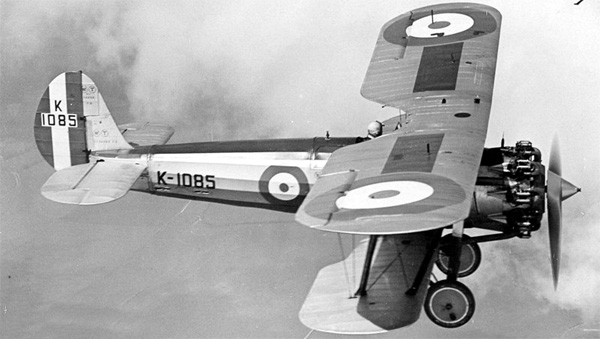
The Bristol Bulldog.

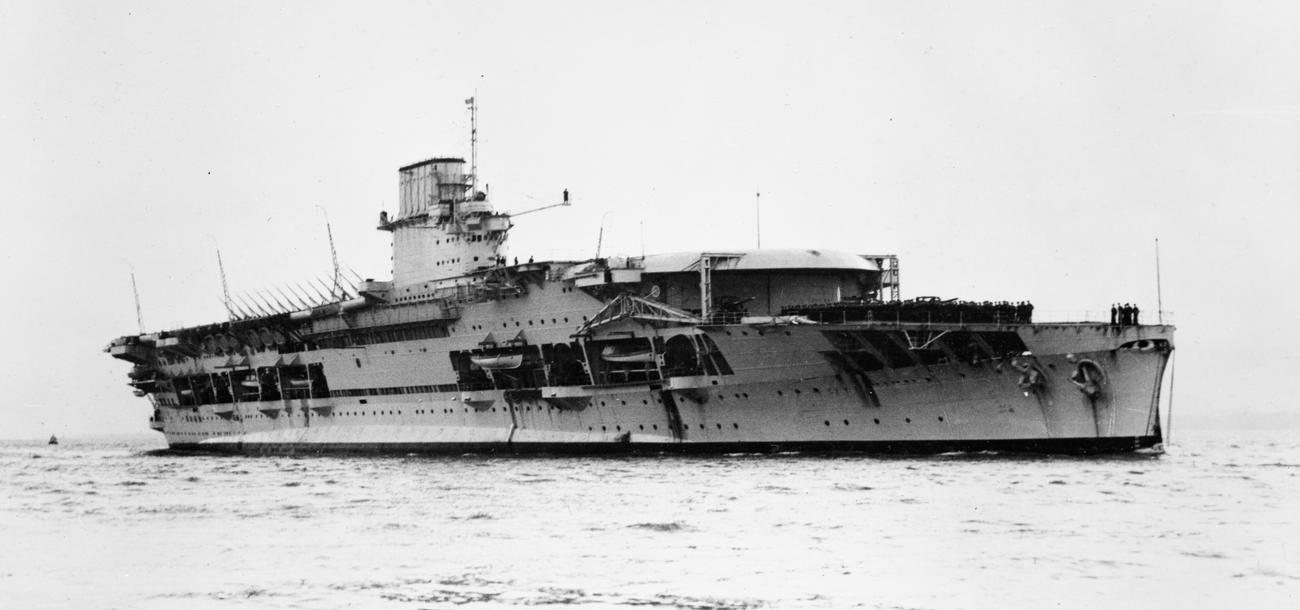
HMS Courageous.

Vielle was admitted to the Royal Air Force College Cranwell in 1932 by a Prize Cadetship awarded by the British Air Ministry. He received his commission in 1934 from King George V. His first appointment was to 32 Squadron at Biggin Hill where he flew Bristol Bulldog fighters. In September 1935 he was sent to the Fleet Air Arm where he flew from the aircraft carrier HMS Courageous in the Mediterranean Sea. The ship had been converted from a battlecruiser to an aircraft carrier as a result of the Washington Naval Treaty.

In August 1937, Vielle joined the Ferry Flight at RAF Cardington where he had the chance to fly many different types of aircraft and began to develop his interest in navigation and flying by instruments. He attended the air force's Specialist Navigation Course in 1939 and joined the Instrument Department of the Royal Aircraft Establishment at Farnborough the same year.

The German invasion of Poland had already occurred during September 1939, so Vielle's flight plan specified a more circuitous route. Rather than taking a dangerous direct line crossing mainland Europe, he flew along the north African Mediterranean coast, finally vectoring to the north at Gibraltar and then to Britain along the Portuguese, Spanish, and French Atlantic coasts. At the time, Britain was retrieving far-flung aircraft—- both military and civilian—- from distant bases and airfields for the looming war against Nazi Germany that would begin in earnest in June 1940 with the Battle of Britain.

During World War II he was involved in the development of new navigation and bombing systems and came to believe that three of his colleagues at the Royal Aircraft Establishment, Farnborough were Soviet agents, conspiring to hamper the British war effort. During 1950, he took his ideas for the "Vielle Bombing System", with a television camera in the nose, to the United States and he believed that his system was the basis for the development of the cruise missile. Vielle retired from the Royal Air Force in 1957 as a group captain. In May 2013, the Wiltshire Times reported that he flew in 150 different types of aircraft during his career.

== Life after the RAF ==
After his retirement from the RAF, Vielle initiated an avionics company, Avel Corporation, to develop an aircraft anti-collision system and began to write novels. He also began to write his memoirs in 1962 but did not publish them until 2013, as Almost a Boffin, as he felt too much of the content was confidential.

Vielle was a member of the Royal Aeronautical Society and a fellow of the Royal Institute of Navigation.

== Family ==
In 1935, Vielle married Marjorie "Bunny" Barnard (died 1990). The couple had three daughters.

== Death ==
Vielle died on 2 April 2015. He was survived by his daughters.

== Selected publications ==
- Village Of Stars. With David Beaty. (As Paul Stanton). 1960.
- Star-Raker. With Donald Payne. Hodder & Stoughton, London, 1961.
- Flight of the Bat. With Donald Payne. (As Donald Gordon). 1964.
- The Golden Oyster. Morrow, New York, 1968.
- No Subway. Collins, London, 1968.
- Leap in the Dark. Morrow, New York, 1971. (U.K. paperback 1972 as Donald Gordon)
- The Shadow of Kuril: A novel. Collins, London, 1971. ISBN 0002217694
- Almost a Boffin. Dolman Scott, 2013. Memoirs. ISBN 978-1909204157
