= Herbert I. Stern =

United States Army officer and centenarian (born 1918)

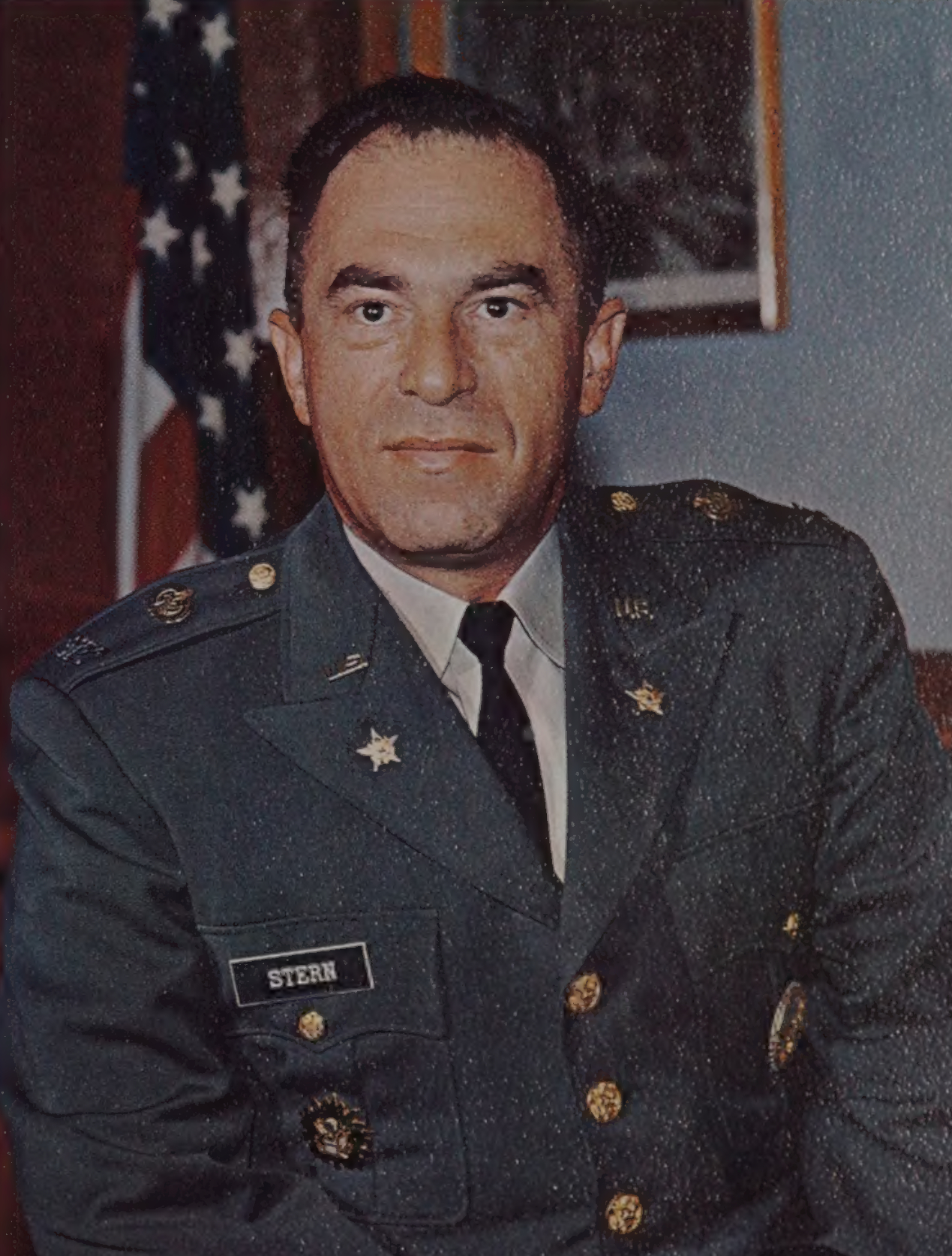
- Stern as Chief of Staff of Fort Jackson c. 1963
- Born: December 24, 1918 (age 107); Baltimore, Maryland, U.S.
- Military career
- Allegiance: United States
- Branch: United States Army
- Service years: 1941–1968
- Rank: Colonel
- Unit: 325th Field Artillery Battalion
- Commands: 325th and 909th Field Artillery Battalions
- Conflicts: World War II: Battle of the Bulge; Western Allied invasion of Germany
- Awards: Silver Star Medal; Legion of Merit
- Other work: Stern's Furniture in Rockville

Herbert Irving Stern (born December 24, 1918) is an American World War II battalion commander during World War II who is the oldest living graduate of the U.S. Military Academy at West Point. His journey to West Point began in the summer of 1937, when he secured an appointment to the academy as a member of the Class of 1941. Stern's ambition to attend West Point was evident from a young age, and he graduated from high school at 16 before attending a preparatory school for a year. Initially promised an appointment by Maryland Senator Radcliffe, Stern ultimately received his through a competitive exam after the promise was retracted. As a battalion commander during World War II, Stern was awarded a Silver Star Medal during the Battle of the Bulge for his actions. In late April 1945, while driving through Salzwedel, Germany, Stern and his men discovered a satellite camp of Neuengamme concentration camp with 3,000 Jewish women. They liberated the camp, providing immediate relief to the prisoners and destroyed the facility. Stern is recognized on the wall of Jewish alumni of West Point at West Point Jewish Chapel.

== Cadet Experience ==
Stern in 1941, during his time at West Point

As a cadet, Stern was actively involved in various extracurricular activities including the chess club, soccer team, and camera club. Known for his “adventurous and fun-loving spirit” combined with a "calculating, ambitious mind," he graduated as a Cadet Sergeant. During his four years at West Point, Stern underwent extensive cavalry training, despite his aversion to horses.

== World War II ==
When the Battle of the Bulge began on December 16, 1944, Stern's unit, the 325th Field Artillery Battalion of the 84th Infantry Division, was stationed in northern Germany. The unit was quickly moved to the Bulge and arrived in Marche, Belgium, on December 19, 1944. As the battle intensified, Stern, then a major, was the senior officer available to lead his battalion after their commander was reassigned.

In the midst of severe weather conditions—freezing cold, intermittent snow, and near-constant fog—Stern made a critical decision to personally register his guns on a crossroads position, despite orders to remain at the command post. His actions led to a devastating artillery strike against an advancing German armored column, which many observers believe marked a turning point in the battle. This strike played a significant role in halting the German advance and was a pivotal moment in the battle.

For his valorous actions during this period, Stern was awarded the Silver Star. On a subsequent occasion during the battle, Stern's battalion came under intense enemy fire while advancing in a jeep near the front lines. After temporarily seeking cover in a water-filled ditch, Stern risked his own safety to move the jeep forward and call in artillery fire, which successfully silenced enemy guns and protected his men.

Prior to the Battle of the Bulge, Stern and his unit had been trained in the use of the newly introduced variable time (VT) fuze near Aachen, Germany. They utilized this fuze during the battle with devastating effectiveness against enemy positions.

Following their time in the Bulge, Stern's battalion continued operations in northern Germany. They crossed the Roer River, advanced through the Siegfried Line, and reached the Rhine River, engaging in continuous combat. Stern formally assumed command of his battalion after his superior was reassigned. He later commanded two artillery battalions, the 325th and 909th Field Artillery Battalions, in support of the 333rd Infantry Regiment.

During an engagement with a German tank unit, Stern's battalion successfully defended against the attack, thanks in part to their previous training. Despite significant losses and the destruction of their equipment, there were no casualties among the men. Stern's battalion was recommended for a Presidential Unit Citation, but the recommendation was denied due to insufficient casualties, a decision Stern believed was unjust.

In late April 1945, while driving through Salzwedel, Germany, Stern and his men discovered a concentration camp with 3,000 Jewish women. They liberated the camp, providing immediate relief to the prisoners and destroying the facility. Stern later returned to check on the women and observed their transformation from severely malnourished prisoners to healthier individuals due to the care they received.

== Post-War Career ==
After World War II, Stern continued his military service in various high-profile assignments. He attended the French War College in Paris, then joined the 60th Field Artillery Battalion in Germany before serving as the provost marshal for southern Bavaria. In July 1947, he returned to the U.S. and served with Headquarters, Army Ground Forces, and in Indo-China supporting French forces.

His subsequent roles included positions at the Army War College, NATO headquarters in Italy, and the Joint Advanced Study Group with the Office of the Joint Chiefs of Staff, where he worked on a classified study at President Dwight D. Eisenhower's request. Stern's final military assignment was with the Central Treaty Organization in Turkey and Iran before retiring as a Colonel on September 1, 1968.

== Later life ==
After retiring from the Army, Stern managed his family's business, Stern's Furniture, in Rockville, Maryland. He moved to Falcons Landing, Potomac Falls, Virginia, a retirement community for veterans, in the early 2000s with his wife, Rose, who died in 2015 after over 70 years of marriage. Stern remained active well into his 100s, enjoying pheasant hunting with his son, Robert. In recognition of his longevity and service, Stern was celebrated as the oldest living West Point graduate in 2023 and last surviving member of his graduating class.
