= Women in the Indian Armed Forces =

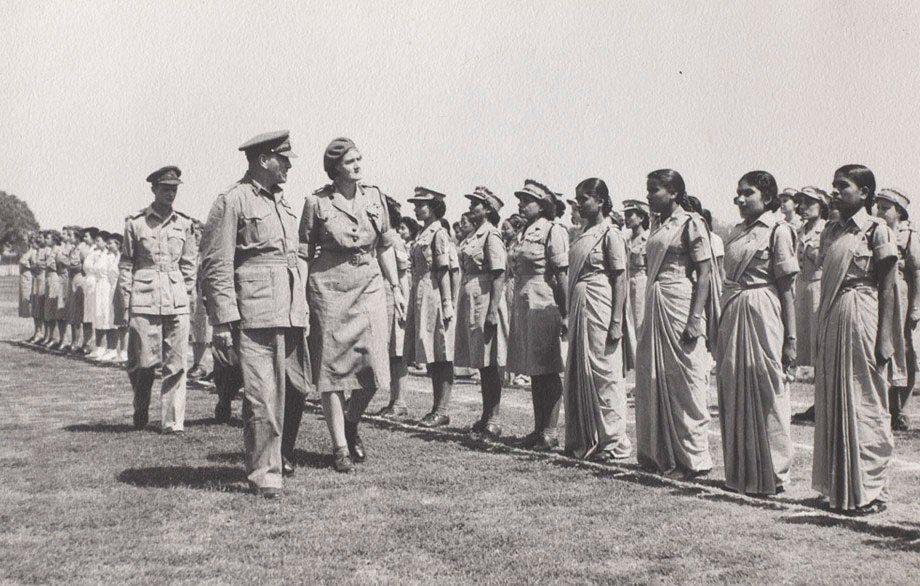
Field Marshal Sir Claude Auchinleck inspects Women's Auxiliary Corps (India) personnel, c. 1947

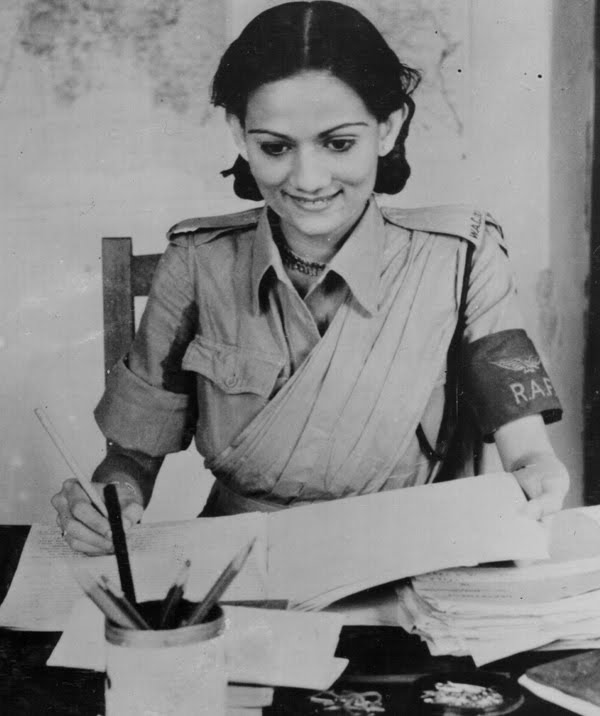
A Women's Auxiliary Corps private on duty in the orderly room of a Royal Air Force station in India, August 1943

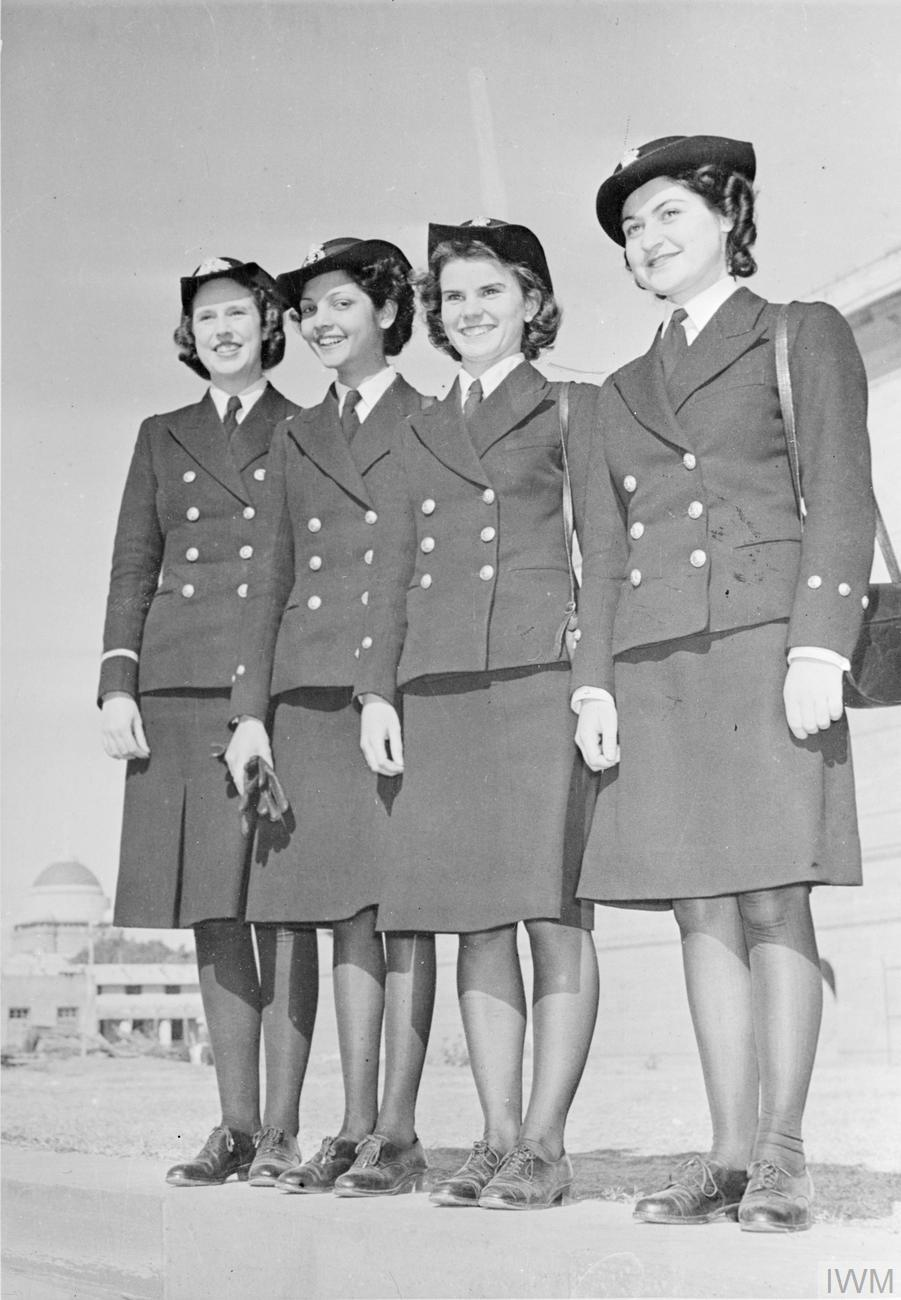
Women of the Women's Auxiliary Corps Naval Wing, 1945

Women in the Indian Armed Forces serve primarily in combat service support branches and in non combatant roles. In 2018, female officers made up 13.09% of the Indian Air Force, 6% of the Indian Navy, and 3.8% of the Indian Army, increases from 8.5%, 3%, and 3% respectively in 2014. By 2020, three women held the rank of lieutenant-general or its equivalent, all within the Medical Services. In May 2021, the Army inducted its first 83 female sepoys into the Corps of Military Police. On 30 March 2023, the Indian Navy inducted 273 female sailors among a graduating class of 2,585 agniveers at INS Chilka. The Indian Air Force also welcomed its first 153 female agniveers on 7 March 2024, following their graduation from the Airmen Training School in Belagavi.

== History ==
In 1888, the British Indian Army (BIA) established the Indian Military Nursing Service (MNS), marking the first time that the BIA recruited female service members. MNS nurses served during World War I and World War II, during which 350 were killed, captured, or declared missing. One of the service's greatest losses occurred in February 1942, when Imperial Japanese bombers sank the SS Kuala while it was transporting nurses. Later, in May 1942, the Women's Auxiliary Corps was established to support BIA operations; by the end of World War II, it had recruited 11,500 women.

Noor Inayat Khan, who was of Indian descent, served in the Special Operations Executive (SOE) during World War II. She was secretly sent to German-occupied France to assist in SOE operations. Khan was betrayed and captured before being subsequently executed at the Dachau concentration camp, and was posthumously awarded the George Cross for her service. Kalyani Sen, the first Indian servicewoman to visit the United Kingdom, served in the Royal Indian Navy's Women's Royal Indian Naval Service during World War II. In 2021, the National Defence Academy entrance exam of the Indian Armed Forces was opened to female cadets.

== Indian Army ==
=== Summary table of commission by corps ===
Under the Army Act of 1950, women were ineligible for regular commissions except in "such corps, departments or branches which the central government may specify by way of notifications." On 1 November 1958, the Army Medical Corps became the first unit of the Indian Army to grant regular commissions to women. Since 1992, women have been inducted into various branches of the Indian Army with only a short service commission. In 2008, women were first inducted as permanent commissioned officers in the Legal and Education corps. In 2020, they were similarly inducted into eight more corps. As of 2020, women were not yet allowed as combatants in the Parachute Regiment of the Indian Army or other special forces. However, they can join the paratrooper wings of their respective arms, such as para EME, para signals, and para ASC.

Here is the status of women's induction in various branches of the military:

Serial number	Name of corps/regiment	Women commissioned	Since	Notes
1	Army Aviation Corps	Yes	2020	Women cannot get permanent commission.
2	Army Corps of Signals	Yes	1992	Since 2020 in permanent commission (short service commission).
3	Army Dental Corps	Yes	1888 or earlier	Since 1958 in permanent commission (long service commission).
4	Army Education Corps	Yes	1992	Since 2008 in permanent commission (short service commission).
5	Army Medical Corps	Yes	1888 or earlier	Since 1958 in permanent commission (long service commission).
6	Army Ordnance Corps	Yes	1992	Since 2020 in permanent commission (short service commission).
7	Army Postal Service Corps	Yes	1992	Women cannot get a permanent commission.
8	Army Service Corps	Yes	2020	Since 2020 in permanent commission (short service commission).
9	Corps of Army Air Defence	Yes	2020	Since 2020 in permanent commission (short service commission).
10	Corps of Electronics and Mechanical Engineers	Yes	1992	Since 2020 in permanent commission (short service commission).
11	Corps of Engineers	Yes	2020	Since 2020 in permanent commission (short service commission).
12	Corps of Military Police	Yes	2020	In January 2019 it was decided by the MoD, to induct women into CMP for the first time in PBOR roles, ie non-officer roles (jawans).
13	Defence Security Corps	No	N.A.	Women cannot get commission.
14	Intelligence Corps	Yes	2020 (short service commission)	Capt. Ganeve Lalji was the first Aide de camp to an army commander (Lieutenant General).
15	Judge Advocate General's Department	Yes	1992	Since 2008 in permanent commission (short service commission).
16	Military Nursing Service	Yes	1888	Major General Lisamma PV is the present Additional Director General (ADG) of the MNS. It is a woman-only regiment in the army.
17	Pioneer Corps	No	N.A.	Women cannot get commission.
18	Regiments (Armoured)	No	N.A.	Women cannot get commission.
19	Regiments (Artillery)	Yes	2023	Since 2023 in permanent commission (short service commission).
20	Regiments (Infantry)	No	N.A.	Women cannot get commission.
21	Regiments (Mechanised)	No	N.A.	Women cannot get commission.
22	Remount and Veterinary Corps	No	N.A.	Women can get commission.
23	Territorial Army	Yes	2018	Women cannot get permanent commission.

=== Notable women ===
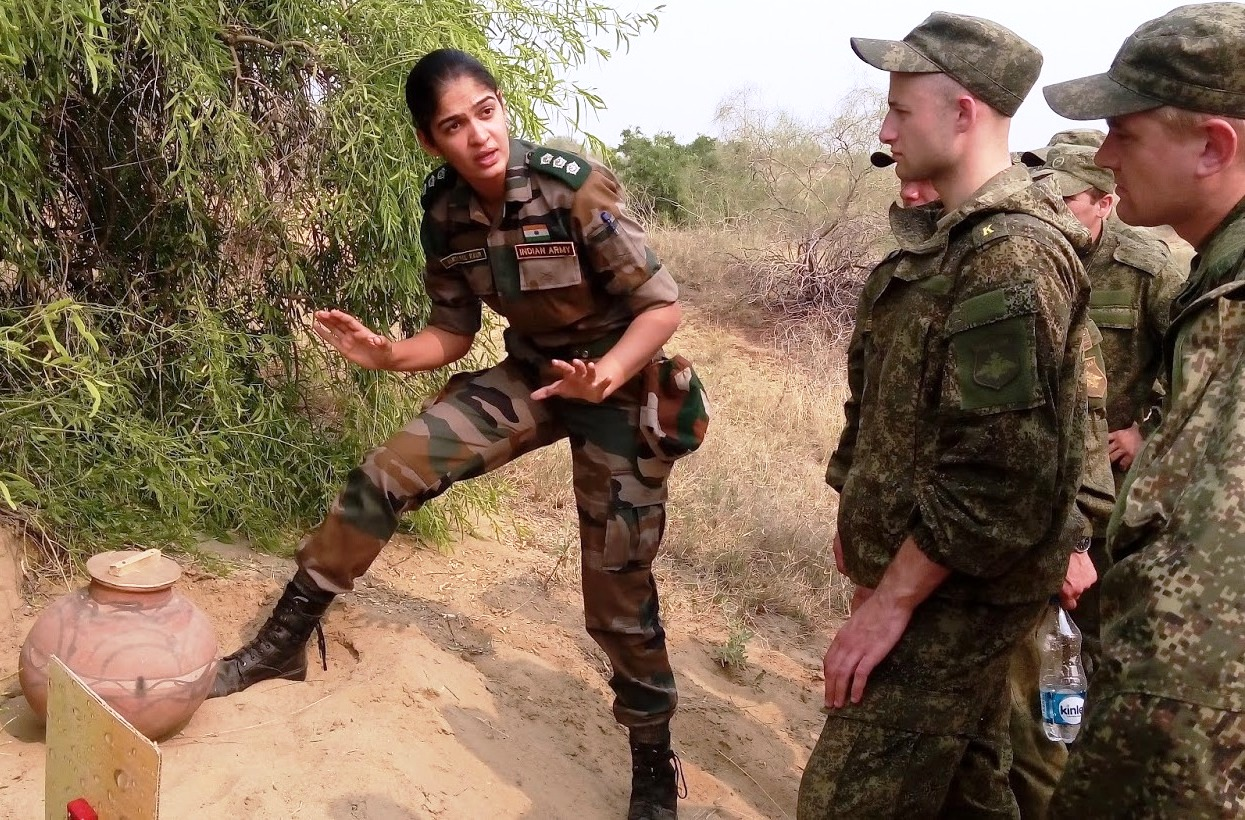
A female officer of the Indian Army briefing Russian soldiers during a joint exercise in 2015.

As of 2020, women were not allowed to serve in combat units such as the Infantry, Mechanised Infantry, or Armoured Corps.

On 27 August 1976, Gertrude Alice Ram, the MNS Matron-in-Chief, became the first female officer in the Indian Army to attain the rank of Major General and the first woman in the Indian Armed Forces to attain a two-star rank. With Ram's promotion, India became the third nation to promote a woman to flag rank, following the United States and France.

In 1992, the Indian Army began inducting women officers in non-medical roles. On 19 January 2007, the United Nations' first all-female peacekeeping force, made up of 105 Indian policewomen, was deployed to Liberia. Ruchi Sharma became the Indian Army's first female operational paratrooper after joining in 1996.

Priya Jhingan, commissioned in 1993, was one of the first 25 women to join the Indian Army as an officer. Alka Khurana Sharma was also among the first women to join the Indian Army, serving ten years in the Army Ordnance Corps. In 1992, she became the first female officer to participate in the Army Day and Republic Day parades. Sapper Shanti Tigga, who joined in 2011, became the first female jawan (private rank) in the Indian Army. Following the death of her husband in a 2012 counter-insurgency operation, Priya Semwal joined the Indian Army Corps of EME, becoming the first wife of a fallen jawan to be commissioned as an officer.

Lieutenant Colonel Mitali Madhumita, commissioned in 2000, is the first female officer in India to receive a gallantry award. She was awarded the Sena Medal in 2011 for exemplary courage shown during the February 2010 terrorist attack on the Indian embassy in Kabul, Afghanistan, as well as for operations in Jammu-Kashmir and the Northeast states.

Anjana Bhaduria, a member of the inaugural 1992 batch of female cadets at the Officers Training Academy, Chennai, was the first female officer in the Indian Army to win a gold medal. Along with Priya Jhingan, this first group of women officers was commissioned in March 1993. Divya Ajith Kumar, commissioned in 2010, was the first female officer to receive the Sword of Honor. In 2015, she led a contingent of 154 women officers and cadets during the Republic Day parade.

Captain Swati Singh, an engineer and the only female officer in her brigade at the time, was the first woman to be deployed at Nathu La pass as a Signals in-charge. In February 2020, Madhuri Kanitkar became the third woman to be promoted to Lieutenant General in the Indian Army. She and her husband, who is also a Lieutenant General, became the first couple in Indian history to both achieve that rank.

On 17 February 2020, the Supreme Court of India ruled that women officers in the Indian Army are eligible for command positions on par with their male counterparts. The court dismissed the government's opposing arguments as discriminatory, disturbing, and based on stereotypes. The court also mandated that permanent commissions be made available to all women, regardless of their years of service, ordering implementation within three months. Although the government had previously suggested that troops would not accept women as commanding officers, eight more corps and branches began inducting women as commissioned officers.

Ganeve Lalji of the Corps of Military intelligence became the first woman to serve as an Aide-de-camp to an Army Commander (Lieutenant General).

== Indian Navy ==
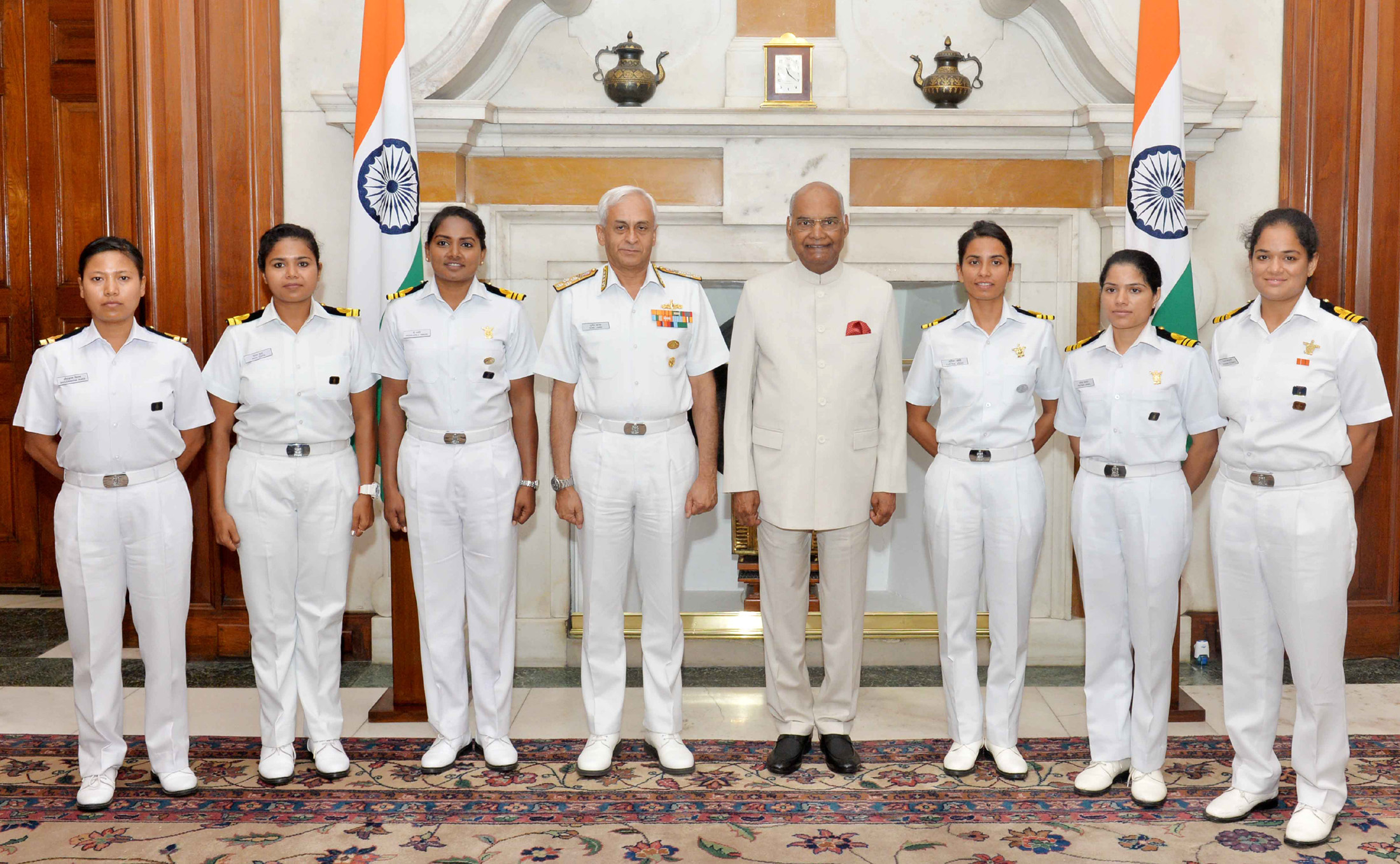
All-women crew of INSV Tarini on completion of their voyage of circumnavigation of the globe.

In October 1976, Dr. Barbara Ghosh became the first woman officer in the Indian Navy to attain the rank of Commander. Having joined the navy in 1961, she was also the first woman medical officer to receive a permanent naval commission.

Dr. Punita Arora, commissioned in 1968, was the first woman in the Indian Army to reach the second-highest rank of Lieutenant General and the first female Vice Admiral.

On 8 March 2018 (International Women's Day), the six-member crew of the INSV Tarini, which participated in the Navika Sagar Parikrama, was conferred the Nari Shakti Puraskar for their outstanding contribution toward women's empowerment. The crew included Lt. Cdr. Vartika Joshi, Lt. Cdr. P. Swathi, Lt. Cdr. Pratibha Jammwal, Lt. Payal Gupta, Lt. Aishwarya Boddapati, and Lt. Shourgrakpam Vijaya Devi. The award was received on behalf of the crew by Lieutenant Shourgrakpam Vijaya Devi, Northeast India's first female naval officer. All six officers were also awarded the Nao Sena Medal (Gallantry) and the Tenzing Norgay National Adventure Award.

On 2 December 2019, Sub-lieutenant Shubhangi Swaroop became the first woman pilot for the Indian Navy, flying the Dornier 228 surveillance aircraft. In September 2020, two women officers, Sub-Lieutenants Kumudini Tyagi and Riti Singh, were deployed onboard warships for the first time. They were selected as airborne tacticians to operate from the decks of naval vessels.

On 26 August 2021, Surgeon Vice Admiral Sheila S. Mathai became the fourth woman to be promoted to a three-star rank and the first woman to achieve to rank of Vice Admiral directly within the Navy. Surgeon Vice Admiral Arti Sarin is the third woman to hold a three-star rank in the Indian Navy.

In December 2023, Lieutenant Commander Prerna Deosthalee became the first woman officer of the Indian Navy to command an Indian naval warship.

In July 2025, Sub-Lieutenant Astha Poonia of Meerut was inducted as the Indian Navy's first woman fighter pilot for MiG-29K fighter jets, based at aircraft carriers INS Vikramaditya and INS Vikrant.

== Indian Air Force ==
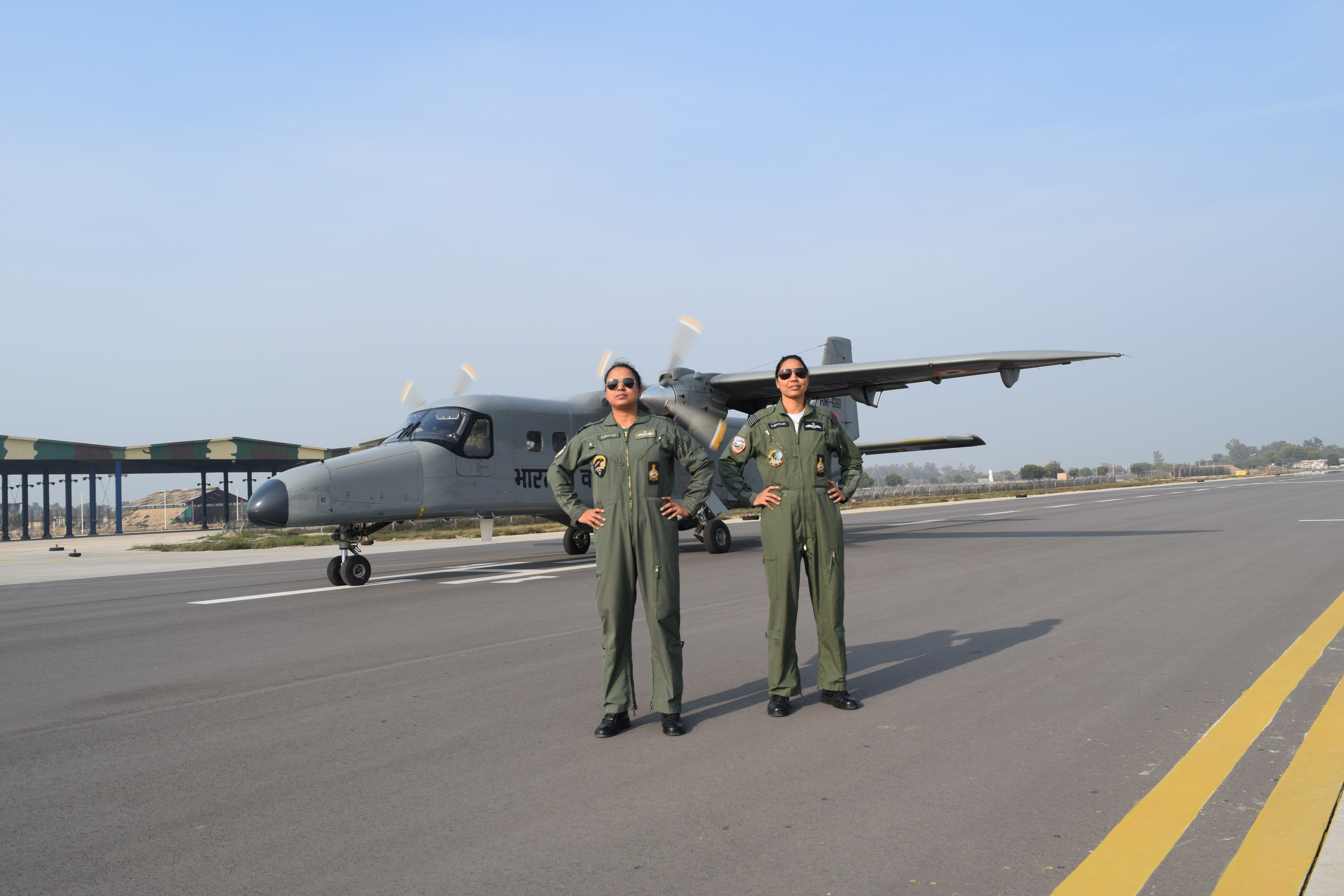
Women Pilots of the Indian Air Force

The Indian Air Force (IAF) inducts women in all roles, including combat and support roles. As of September 2020, there were 1,875 female officers serving in the IAF, including 10 pilots and 18 navigators. The first woman officer in the IAF was Wing Commander Vijayalakshmi Ramanan. Originally commissioned into the Army Medical Corps, she was seconded to the Air Force and served until her retirement in 1979. In August 1966, Flight Lieutenant Kanta Handa, became the first female medical officer to receive a commendation for her service during the Indo-Pakistani war of 1965.

While women began serving as pilots in support roles in 1994, Flight Officers Gunjan Saxena and Sreevidya Rajan became the first women to fly in a combat zone during the 1999 Kargil War. Subsequent milestones include Deepika Misra becoming the first female IAF pilot to train for the Sarang display team in 2006, and Flight Lieutenant Nivedita Singh becoming the first woman from the IAF to summit Mount Everest in 2012.

In 2015, the IAF expanded combat opportunities for women as fighter pilots. In 2019, Avani Chaturvedi, Mohana Singh Jitarwal, and Bhawana Kanth were inducted as the first three female fighter pilots. On 22 May 2019, Kanth became the first woman fighter pilot to qualify for combat missions. All three pilots were awarded the Nari Shakti Puraskar on International Women's Day, 8 March 2020.

Other recent milestones include Wing Commander Shaliza Dhami becoming the first woman officer granted a permanent commission in 2019, and Squadron Leader Minty Agarwal becoming the first woman to receive the Yudh Seva Medal that same year. More recently, On 25 August 2025, a formation led by Squadron Leader Priya Sharma flew the final sortie of the MiG-21 BISON from Nal Airbase alongside Air Chief Marshal Amar Preet Singh.

== Special Forces of India ==
As of 2020, Women are not yet allowed as combatant in the combat specialist forces, such as Ghatak Force, para commandos, etc. Indian Army's para commandos is a voluntary service and the recruitment procedure of Para and Para SF does not strictly mention any gender for the soldiers that can participate. It is not clear if any women have been able to participate or qualify for this ELITE force. The Indian Airforce and the Indian Navy have allowed women to join the Garud Commando Force and the MARCOS respectively. It is not clear as of 2023, if any women have been able to qualify.

Dr. Seema Rao, also known as "India's Wonder Woman", is India's first woman commando trainer, having trained over 15,000 Special Forces of India (including the NSG, MARCOS, GARUD) as full-time guest trainer for 20 years without compensation as a pioneer in close quarter battle (CQB).

== Paramilitary forces of India ==
Women in Indian Coast Guard, Assam Rifles and Special Frontier Force.

=== Indian Coast Guard ===
Women can join the Indian Coast Guard in officer ranks as general duty, pilot or law officers. In January 2017, Indian Coast Guard became the first force to deploy four female officers, assistant commandants Anuradha Shukla, Sneha Kathayat, Shirin Chandran and Vasundhara Chouksey, in combat roles on board KV Kuber hovercraft ship patrolling the Indian maritime zone bordering Pakistan and Bangladesh.

=== Assam Rifles ===
In April 2016, Assam Rifles inducted a first batch of 100 female soldiers who had undergone year-long training programme and graduated in the passing-out parade at the Assam Rifles Training Centre and School in Shokhüvi in Chümoukedima District of Nagaland. They will be deployed at Cordon And Search Operation (CASO), Mobile Check Posts (MCP) and road opening operations in various battalions for search, frisking and interrogation of women, crowd control and dispersal of female agitators.

In August 2020, around 30 rifle-women from Assam Rifles were deployed along the LoC for the first time. They are led by Captain Gursimran Kaur of the Army Service Corps.

=== Special Frontier Force ===
Special Frontier Force, created in 1962 as a most covert and elite Special Force unit as the armed wing of RAW to conduct covert operations behind the Chinese Lines in the event of another Sino-Indian War, inducted 500 female in 1972 for the first time in medical, signals and clerical roles.

== Central Armed Police Forces ==
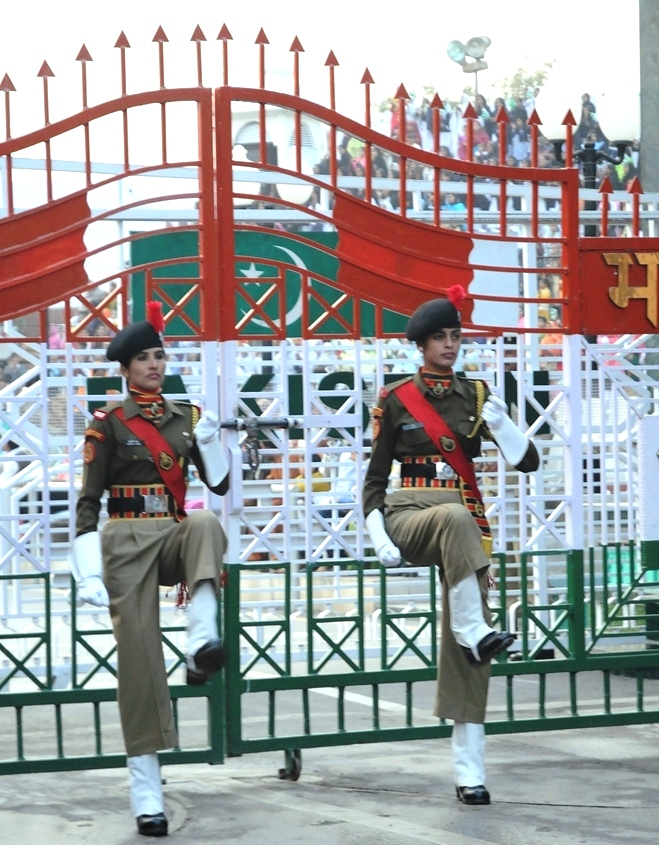
Women of the Border Security Force at the Indian Pakistan border

In 1992, Asha Sinha, a 1982 Batch IPS Officer, became the First Woman Commandant in the Paramilitary forces of India when she was posted as Commandant, Central Industrial Security Force in Mazagon Dock Shipbuilders Limited and after 34 years of service she retired as Director General of Police (DGP). In 2018 an IPS Officer Archana Ramasundram of 1980 Batch became the First Woman to become the Director General of Police of a Paramilitary Force as DG, Sashastra Seema Bal, she retired after serving for 37 years.

In March 2016, govt allowed direct-entry women officers in all five Central Armed Police Forces, namely Central Reserve Police Force (CRPF), Border Security Force (BSF), Indo-Tibetan Border Police (ITBP), Sashastra Seema Bal (SSB) and Central Industrial Security Force (CISF), allow direct entry to women in junior rank via direct recruitment and also to women officer via Union Public Service Commission in supervisory combat roles. In March 2016, Home Minister Rajnath Singh announced that women will be inducted in 33% constable-rank personnel in CRPF and CISF and 15% in the border guarding forces BSF, SSB and ITBP.

=== Central Reserve Police Force ===
Central Reserve Police Force (CRPF) allows women officers in supervisory combat roles since a long time via UPSC route.

=== Central Industrial Security Force ===
Central Industrial Security Force (CISF) allows women officers in supervisory combat roles since a long time via UPSC route.

=== Border Security Force ===
Border Security Force (BSF) allowed women officers in supervisory combat roles in 2013.

=== Sashastra Seema Bal ===
Sashastra Seema Bal (SSB) allowed women officers in supervisory combat roles in 2014.

=== Indo-Tibetan Border Police ===
Indo-Tibetan Border Police (ITBP) allowed women officers in supervisory combat roles in 2016. About 1.75% (1,500) of 80,000 ITBP personnel are women, mostly in the rank of constables (c. March 2016).

== Other Forces ==
Women also serve in the National Security Guard (NSG), Special Protection Group (SPG), Railway Protection Force (RPF), National Disaster Response Force (NDRF) and Border Roads Organisation (BRO).

=== National Security Guard ===
National Security Guard (NSG) (Black Cat Commandos) inducted female commandos for the first in 2011–12, however the first discrimination they faced was from the female then Chief Minister, Mayawati who refused to be guarded by the female commandos. In 2015, govt announced that the female NSG Black Cat Commandos, who undergo the same training as their male counterpart, will be deployed in counter-terrorism operations as they also perform VIP protection duties.

=== Special Protection Group ===
Special Protection Group (SPG) inducted female commandos in 2013, and then Prime Minister Manmohan Singh's wife Gursharan Kaur became the first SPG protectee to have women commandos.

=== Railway Protection Force ===
Railway Protection Force (RPF) has female unit, Shakti Squad. In 2015, 25-year-old Debashmita Chattopadhyay became first female Assistant Security Commissioner (ASC) in RPF who took charge of the Shakti squad of RPF women constables.

Sonali Mishra became first women Director General of RPF.

=== National Disaster Response Force ===
National Disaster Response Force (NDRF) got its first woman commander in 2015 when 40-years old senior Commandant Rekha Nambiar joined the 4th Battalion based in Arakkonam in Tamil Nadu to lead 1,000 personnel-strong all-men battalion.

=== Border Roads Organisation ===
In June 2021, Vaishali Hiwase became the first women commanding officer to command a BRO Road Construction Company part of the India-China Border Roads.

== Three star officers ==
Eight women have been promoted to three-star rank in the Indian Armed Forces. All of them are from the Medical Corps and graduate medical doctors of the Armed Forces Medical College (AFMC). Surgeon Vice Admiral Arti Sarin is the first woman to serve as Director General Armed Forces Medical Services (DGAFMS) and the highest-ranking woman officer in the history of the Indian Armed Forces.

S.No	Photo	Name	Branch	Date of promotion	Notes
1		Lieutenant General Punita Arora; PVSM, SM, VSM	Indian Army	1 September 2004	First woman to be elevated to three-star rank. Later moved to the Indian Navy and held the rank of Vice Admiral.
2		Air Marshal Padma Bandopadhyay; PVSM, AVSM, VSM	Indian Air Force	1 October 2004	First woman to be promoted to three-star rank in the Indian Air Force.
3		Lieutenant General Madhuri Kanitkar; PVSM, AVSM, VSM	Indian Army	29 February 2020	Last served as Deputy Chief of the Integrated Defence Staff (Medical) (DCIDS (Med)) at HQ IDS.
4		Surgeon Vice Admiral Sheila S. Mathai; NM, VSM	Indian Navy	26 August 2021	Last served as Director General (Organization and Personnel) of Armed Forces Medical Services (AFMS).
5		Lieutenant General Rajshree Ramasethu	Indian Army	16 September 2021	Former Commandant of Armed Forces Medical College (AFMC).
6		Surgeon Vice Admiral Arti Sarin; PVSM, AVSM, VSM	Indian Navy	5 October 2022	Current Director General Armed Forces Medical Services. First woman to serve as DGAFMS and the highest-ranking woman officer in the history of the Indian Armed Forces.
7		Lieutenant General Sadhna S Nair; AVSM, VSM	Indian Army	23 October 2023	Last served as Director General Medical Services (Army). Earlier Director General Hospital Services (Armed Forces) in the rank of Air Marshal.
8		Surgeon Vice Admiral Kavita Sahai; SM, VSM	Indian Navy	1 February 2024	Last served as Director General Medical Services (Navy).

== In popular culture ==
- Aarohan (1996–97), tele serial showcasing women officers serving in the Indian Navy.
- The Test Case (2017), web series on the fictional story of the first woman training to serve in a combat role within the Indian Armed Forces.
- Gunjan Saxena: The Kargil Girl (2020–21), biographical film starring Janhvi Kapoor as real life Indian Air Force pilot Gunjan Saxena who was the first Indian female airforce pilot in combat.
- Tejas (film) (2023), Kangana Ranaut plays the role of Indian Air Force Pilot Tejas Gill is on a mission to rescue an Indian spy who has some very confidential information while also battling with her tragic past of haunted memories.

== See also ==
- Timeline of women in the Indian military and Coast Guard
- Serving generals of the Indian Army
- National Commission for Women
- Welfare schemes for women in India
- Women in agriculture in India
- Women in India
- Women's suffrage in India
