= Timeline of women in the Indian military and Coast Guard =

This is a timeline of women in the Indian military and Coast Guard (a paramilitary force under the Ministry of Defence).

== Pre-Independence (to 15 August 1947) ==
=== 1888 ===
28 March

The Military Nursing Service in India is established, with the arrival in India of 10 British Army nurses to organise nursing for British troops in India.

=== 1896 ===
The Military Nursing Service becomes the Indian Army Nursing Service (IANS).

=== 1903 ===
The Indian Army Nursing Service becomes the Queen Alexandra's Military Nursing Service for India - QAMNS (I), the Indian branch of Queen Alexandra's Imperial Military Nursing Service (QAIMNS), formed the previous year.

=== 1914 ===
Following the outbreak of war, the Temporary Nursing Service for Indian Soldiers (TINS) is formed, with Indian nurses being recruited for the first time.

=== 1915–1918 ===
60 temporary nurses are appointed to the TINS in 1915, and the TINS serves in Indian and British troop hospitals in India, Aden, Mesopotamia and Egypt during the First World War.

=== 1926 ===
1 October
The Queen Alexandra's Military Nursing Service for India is amalgamated with the main QAIMNS, and the Indian Military Nursing Service (IMNS) is established, under the supervision of QAIMNS officers.

=== 1941 ===
24 September
To relieve an acute shortage of fully trained military nurses brought on by the Second World War, the Auxiliary Nursing Service (India) (ANS-I) is established. Entrants receive a limited amount of training in military and civil hospitals; by the war's end, 2,787 auxiliary nurses have joined the service.

=== 1942 ===
April
The first woman medical officer is commissioned into the Indian Medical Service (IMS) as an emergency commissioned officer. The Women's Auxiliary Corps (India) (WAC-I) is formed the same month, rising to a peak strength of 11,000 across all ranks by the end of the war. Its members serve in various non-combatant roles.

=== 1943 ===
3 April
The Indian Army Medical Corps is formed through amalgamating the Indian Medical Service (IMS), the Indian Medical Department (IMD) and the Indian Hospital Corps (IHC); its members hold the same ranks and status as all other army personnel.
15 September
The Indian Military Nursing Service becomes the Military Nursing Service (MNS), with its members given commissioned rank at par with other armed forces officers.
December
The Naval Wing of the Women's Auxiliary Corps (India) is established, and is renamed the Women's Royal Indian Naval Service (WRINS) in February 1945. The Indian counterpart of the WRNS, its members are employed in the Communications branch of the Royal Indian Navy (RIN) as cipher assistants, telephonists, telegraphists, typists, secretaries, stenographers, personal assistants and mail officers. Other members conduct intelligence work, with those stationed at Bombay and Karachi also assisting with naval training, gunnery and ASW tactics.

=== 1947 ===
15 March
The WAC (I) and the WRINS are officially disbanded and its remaining members demobilised.

== Post-Independence (from 15 August 1947) ==
=== 1947 ===
15 August
Upon Independence, Military Nursing Service officers assume leadership of the service from QAIMNS officers.
13 September
Mrs. D. G. Howard, an Indian Nursing Officer, is appointed the first Indian director of the MNS in the rank of Chief Principal Matron, becoming the first Indian woman officer to hold a rank equivalent to colonel.

=== 1955 ===
August
Vijayalakshmi Ramanan is commissioned into the Indian Army Medical Corps on a short-service commission, and becomes the first woman to be seconded to and hold a commission in the Indian Air Force.

=== 1958 ===
1 November
Women are granted regular commissions in the Army Medical Corps, marking the first time women become eligible for permanent commissions in any branch of the armed forces outside the Military Nursing Service.

=== 1959 ===
All members of the Military Nursing Service are given standard army ranks, formally recognising them as part of the regular army, though QAIMNS-derived designations are retained for those officers in the ranks of Major (Matron) and above.

17 July
Flight Lieutenant Gita Chanda (later Ghosh) becomes the first woman paratrooper in the armed forces after successfully completing her maiden jump at Agra. She also served as an instructor at tha Paratroopers Training School in Agra & later retired as a Wing Commander.

=== 1961 ===
Barbara Ghosh, an officer in the Army Medical Corps, becomes the first woman to hold a naval commission.

=== 1962 ===
11 December
The head of the Military Nursing Service is upgraded in rank, with Chief Principal Matron (Colonel) J. M. Staggs, the head of the MNS since September 1961, becoming the service's first Matron-in-Chief (Brigadier) and the first woman officer in the Armed Forces to attain one-star rank.

=== 1966 ===
19 September
Captain Farida Rehana becomes the first woman army officer to qualify as a paratrooper, having become the first woman in the services to join an operational airborne unit in July. She has actively participated in the 1971 Indo-Bangladesh War, where she served on both the fronts simultaneously, earning the Paschimi Star (Medal) & Poorvi Star (Medal). She also participated in Operation Cactus Lily. She recalls that she had around 500 jumps including Combat free-fall to her credit. She later retires from service as a lieutenant-colonel.

=== 1972 ===
22 August
Vijayalakshmi Ramanan becomes the first woman Air Force officer to be promoted to wing commander (medical branch) whilst holding a permanent commission. She was also awarded the Vishisht Sewa Medal by the President of India.

=== 1976 ===
27 August
The head of the Military Nursing Service is again upgraded in rank, with Matron-in-Chief (Brigadier) Gertrude Alice Ram, the military nursing service Matron-in-Chief since 30 October 1975, becoming the first woman officer in the Indian Army to attain the rank of major-general, and the first female officer in the Indian Armed Forces to attain two-star rank.
October
Barbara Ghosh becomes the first woman officer to be promoted to commander in the navy.

=== 1978 ===
Air Force officer Padmavathy Bandhopadyay becomes the first woman officer in the armed forces to successfully pass out of the Defence Services Staff College.

=== 1991 ===
9 October
The Ministry of Defence approves the commissioning of women as officers on short-service commissions, for an initial period of five years service, into the following non-combat branches of the navy: Education, Logistics and Naval Law.

25 November
The Ministry of Defence approves the commissioning of women as officers on short-service commissions, for an initial period of three years service, into the following non-combat Non-Technical Ground Duty Branches of the air force: Administration, Logistic, Accounts, Education and Meteorological.

=== 1992 ===
30 January
Under the Women Special Entry Scheme (WSES), the non-combat Army streams of the Army Postal Service, the Judge Advocate General's (JAG) department, the Army Education Corps (AEC), the Army Ordnance Corps (Central Ammunition Depots and Material Management) and the Army Service Corps (Food Scientists and Catering Officers) are opened to commissioned women officers. Women entering the army under this scheme are limited to a five-year term of service.
September
Priya Jhingan becomes the first female cadet in the Indian Army upon entering the Officers Training Academy in Chennai.
28 November
The Indian Navy becomes the first armed force to commission women in non-medical streams (Education, Logistics and Naval Law), commissioning its first 22 short-service commission female officers.
December
The Army clears the induction of woman officers into five more non-combat streams (Signals, Intelligence, Electrical and Mechanical Engineering and the Artillery Regiment).

=== 1993 ===
The Navy clears the induction of women as commissioned officers in the Air Traffic Controller (ATC) stream.

6 March
Priya Jhingan becomes the first woman army officer to be commissioned in a non-medical branch, receiving her commission as a second lieutenant in the Judge Advocate General's (JAG) Department. She serves in the army for 10 years, retiring as a major.
1 June
The first batch of woman officers in the IAF Ground Duty branches pass out from the Air Force Academy. The Air Force subsequently opens the Technical, Flying (Pilots) (Transport and Helicopter streams) and Navigation branches to women officers.

=== 1994 ===
17 December
The air force commissions its first seven female pilots.

=== 1996 ===
The Coast Guard is opened to women commissioned officers for an initial period of three years service, with those officers eligible for short-service commissions in the Administration, Logistics, Law and Ground Duties (Pilot) streams.

== See also ==
- Women in Indian Armed Forces
- Women in warfare and the military (1900–1945)
- Women in warfare and the military (1945–1999)
- Women in warfare and the military (2000–present)
