= Rajshree Ramasethu =

Indian general

Lieutenant General Rajshree Ramasethu
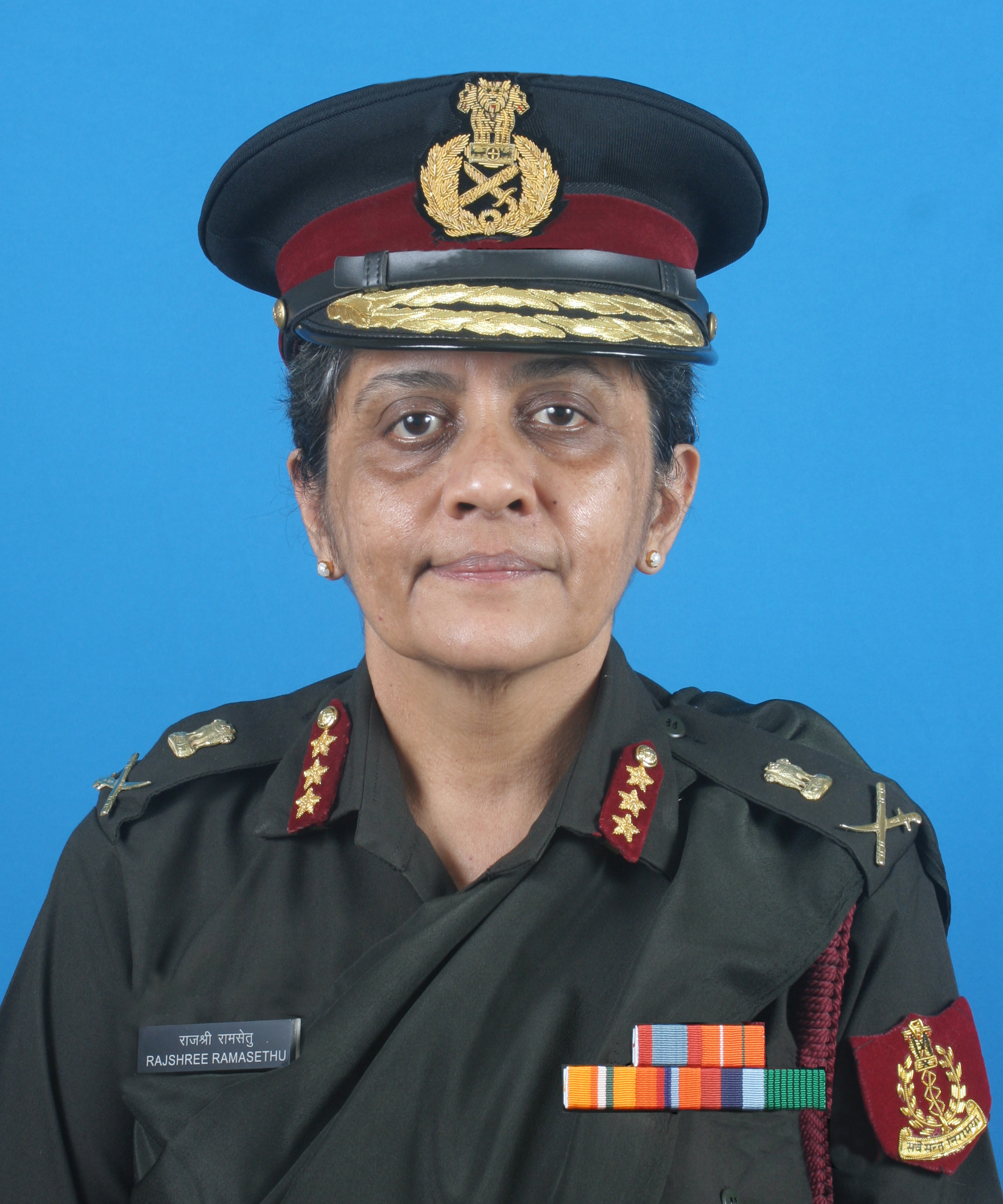
- Ramasethu as Commandant AFMC
- Military career
- Allegiance: India
- Branch: Indian Army
- Service years: 1983 – 2022
- Rank: Lieutenant General
- Unit: Army Medical Corps
- Commands: Armed Forces Medical College MG MED HQ Southern Command Military Hospital Chennai Military Hospital, Pune
- Awards: COAS Commendation three times

Lieutenant General Rajshree Ramasethu is a former general officer of the Indian Army. She is the fifth woman in the Indian Armed Forces and third in the Indian Army to be promoted to a Three-star rank. She last served as the Director and Commandant of the Armed Forces Medical College, Pune.

== Early life and education ==
Ramasethu joined the Armed Forces Medical College, Pune in 1979.

== Military career ==
Ramasethu was commissioned in the Army Medical Corps in December 1983. She did her post-graduation, earning the Doctor of Medicine degree in Internal Medicine. She subsequently underwent super specialisation in Nephrology at the All India Institute of Medical Sciences, New Delhi.

Ramasethu has tenanted appointments of Consultant (medicine and Nephrology) at INHS Asvini, the naval hospital in Mumbai, and the Command Hospital Eastern Command in Kolkata. She has also served as the Commandant of the Military Hospital, Chennai and as the Assistant Chief of the Integrated Defence Staff (Medical) (ACIDS Med) at HQ IDS.

As a Major General, Ramasethu served as the Senior Consultant (Medicine) in the office of the Director General Armed Forces Medical Services (DGAFMS) in New Delhi. She then served as Major General Medical at the Southern Command at Pune. On 16 September 2021, Ramasethu assumed the office of Director and Commandant of her alma-mater Armed Forces Medical College, Pune in the rank of Lieutenant General.

== Awards and decorations ==
Ramasethu has been awarded the Chief of the Army Staff Commendation Card three times - in 1995, 2011 and 2017.

	Special Service Medal	Sainya Seva Medal	
50th Anniversary of Independence Medal	30 Years Long Service Medal	20 Years Long Service Medal	9 Years Long Service Medal

== See also ==
- Women in the Indian Armed Forces
- Punita Arora
- Padma Bandopadhyay
- Madhuri Kanitkar
- Sheila S. Mathai
- Arti Sarin

Military offices
Preceded by Lieutenant General Nardeep Naithani	Commandant Armed Forces Medical College; 2022-present	Succeeded by Surgeon Vice Admiral Arti Sarin
