= Tigga =

Tigga may refer to:

- Manoj Tigga, Indian politician
- Shanti Tigga, soldier
- Torra Tigga railway station
