= Arti Sarin =

Indian admiral

Surgeon Vice Admiral Arti Sarin PVSM AVSM VSM
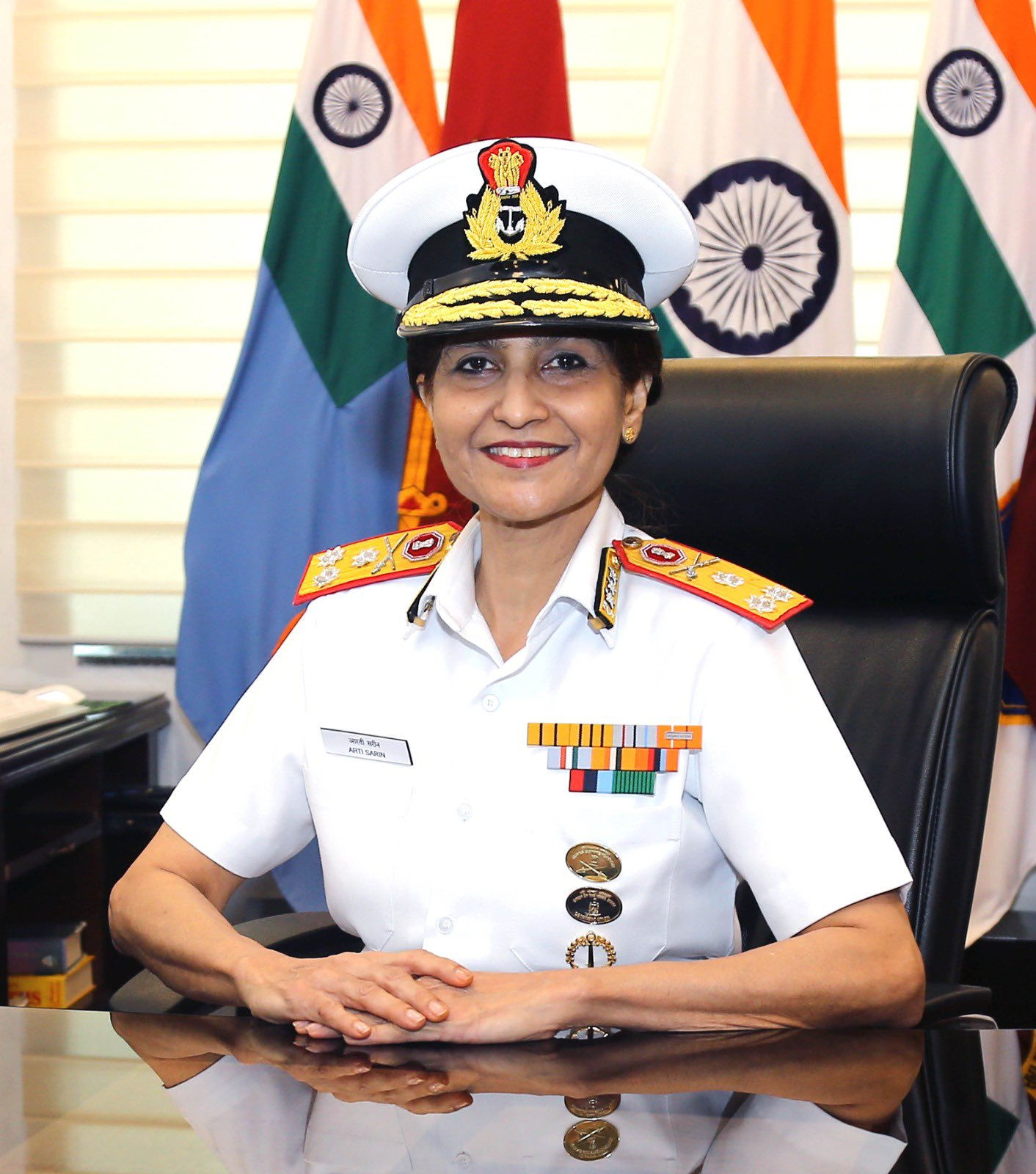
- Sarin as the 46th DGAFMS

Director General Armed Forces Medical Services
- President: Droupadi Murmu
- Preceded by: Lieutenant General Daljit Singh
- Succeeded by: Air Marshal Sandeep Thareja

Personal details
- Awards: Param Vishisht Seva Medal; Ati Vishisht Seva Medal; Vishisht Seva Medal

Military service
- Allegiance: India
- Branch/service: Indian Navy
- Years of service: 26 December 1985 – 31 August 2026
- Rank: Surg Vice Admiral
- Commands: Armed Forces Medical Services; Armed Forces Medical College; INHS Asvini
- Service number: 75408-F

Surgeon Vice Admiral Arti Sarin, PVSM, AVSM, VSM is a former flag officer in the Indian Navy. She last served as the director general armed forces medical services, the senior-most appointment in the Armed Forces Medical Services (DGAFMS). She was the first woman to serve as DGAFMS and the highest-ranking woman officer in the history of the Indian Armed Forces.

She previously served as the director general medical services (navy) and as the director general medical services (air) in the rank of air marshal. She is the sixth woman in the Indian Armed Forces to be promoted to a three-star rank. She is the third woman officer to hold the rank of vice admiral in the Indian Navy, after Surgeon Vice Admiral Punita Arora and Surgeon Vice Admiral Sheila S. Mathai.

She has the distinction of serving in all three branches of the Indian Armed Forces. She served in the Indian Army from the ranks of lieutenant to captain, in the Indian Navy from surgeon lieutenant to surgeon vice admiral and in the Indian Air Force as an air marshal.

== Early life and education ==
Sarin attended the Timpany School, Visakhapatnam. She then joined the Armed Forces Medical College, Pune. At AFMC, she completed her MBBS degree, passing out in the same batch as future Director General Medical Services (Army) Sadhna Saxena Nair. She then did her post-graduation in 1992, earning the Doctor of Medicine degree in Radiology from AFMC. She then earned a DNB degree in Radiation Oncology from the Tata Memorial Centre, Mumbai and was trained in Gamma Knife Surgery at the University of Pittsburgh in Pennsylvania.

== Military career ==
Sarin was commissioned in the Armed Forces Medical Services on 26 December 1985 as a lieutenant (surgeon sub-lieutenant). Her career spans across all three services – the Indian Army, the Indian Navy, and the Indian Air Force. She was promoted to captain (surgeon lieutenant) on 3 December 1986. On 3 December 1991, Sarin was promoted surgeon lieutenant commander, and was promoted surgeon commander on 14 January 2000.

Sarin has served at the Naval Science and Technological Laboratory (NTSL), a defence laboratory of the Defence Research and Development Organisation (DRDO) in Visakhapatnam. She has also served at the Naval Hospitals INHS Dhanvantari at Port Blair, INHS Kalyani at Visakhapatnam, INHS Sanjivani at Kochi and INHS Asvini at Mumbai. Sarin is an examiner for the National Board of Examinations in Radiotherapy and the Maharashtra University of Health Sciences (MUHS), Nashik. She has also been a recognised post-graduate degree teacher at the Mumbai University, Pune University and at the MUHS for MD Radiology & DNB Radiation Oncology. She has several publications in Indian and international Journals and has contributed to chapters in books on liver disease and assisted reproduction, respectively.

Sarin has served as a Professor & Head of the Department (HOD) Radiation Oncology at Army Hospital (Research & Referral) in Delhi, the Command Hospital Southern Command, Pune, the AFMC and INHS Asvini. In her administrative appointments, she has served as the Senior Registrar (Medical Superintendent) at INHS Asvini and as the Principal Medical Officer Naval Dockyard (Mumbai). Promoted surgeon captain (by selection) on 1 September 2008 (seniority from 2 July), Sarin was promoted surgeon commodore on 1 February 2015. During the COVID-19 pandemic, she oversaw the design and development of innovative solutions and set up quarantine facilities in the Southern Naval Command.

=== Flag rank ===
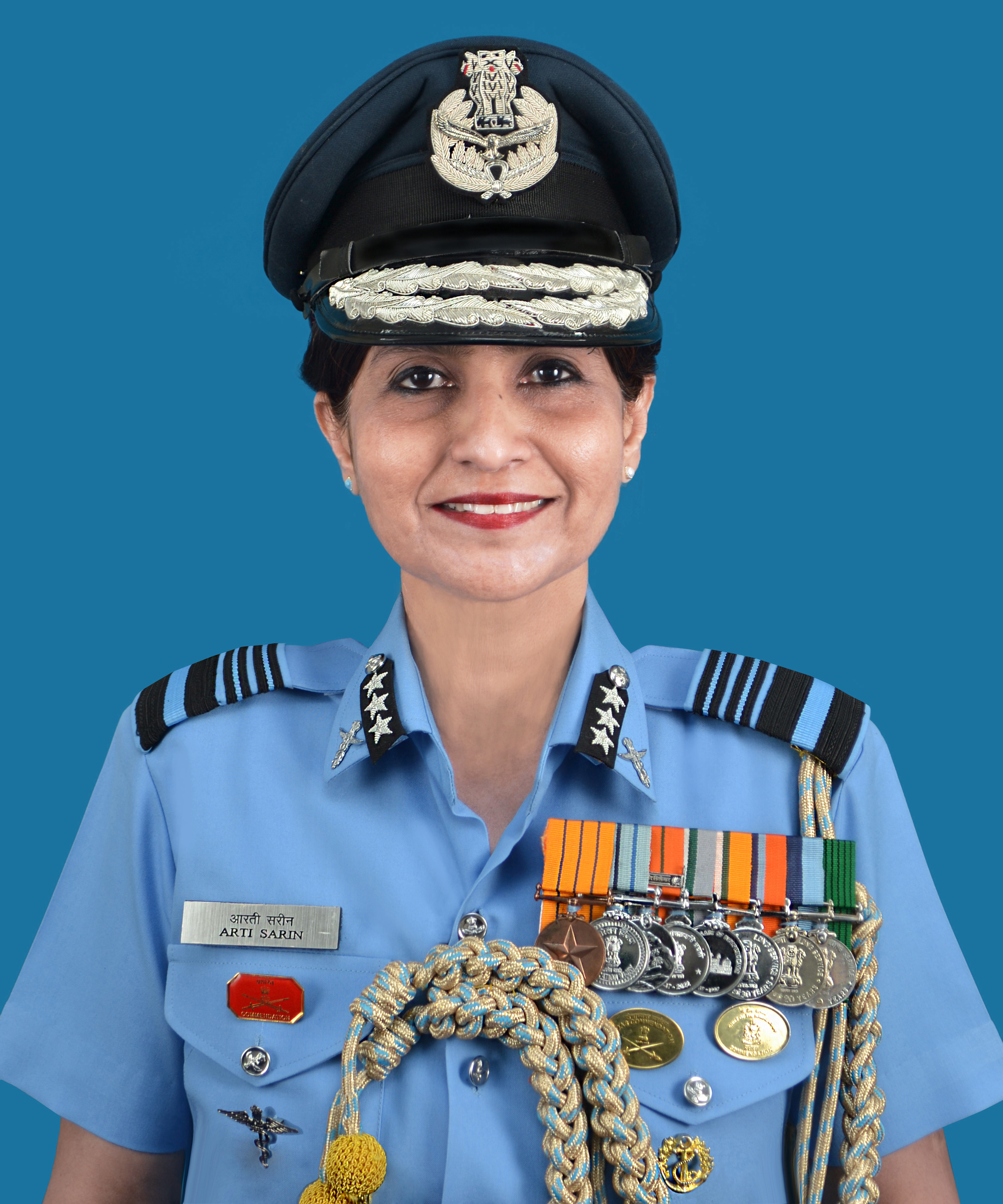
Sarin as the DGMS (Air) in the rank of air marshal.

On 17 June 2020, Sarin was promoted to the rank of Surgeon Rear Admiral, with seniority from 2 March 2020. She was appointed Command Medical Officer, Southern Naval Command (SNC). She is the second woman to have held the appointment of CMO at SNC, the first being Surgeon Rear Admiral Nirmala Kannan. On 26 January 2021, she was awarded the Vishisht Seva Medal for distinguished service of a high order. After a short stint at SNC, she was appointed commanding officer of INHS Asvini. On 31 January 2021, in a rare event of a change of command between two women flag officers, she took over from Surgeon Rear Admiral Sheila S. Mathai. In December 2021, Rear Admiral Sarin relinquished the appointment of Commandant INHS Asvini and was appointed Command Medical Officer Western Naval Command.

On 5 October 2022, Sarin was promoted to the rank of Surgeon Vice Admiral, only the sixth woman to be promoted to three-star rank in the Indian Armed Forces. She was appointed the director and commandant of the Armed Forces Medical College. She took over from another woman three-star officer – Lieutenant General Rajshree Ramasethu. On 10 January 2023, Vice Admiral Sarin took over as the director general medical services (air) (DGMS Air) in the rank of air marshal. After a short stint, in March 2023, she was appointed director general medical services (navy) in the rank of surgeon vice admiral.

Sarin was appointed director general armed forces medical services (DGAFMS), the senior-most appointment of the Armed Forces Medical Services on 1 October 2024. She is the first woman to serve as DGAFMS and the highest-ranking woman officer in the history of the Indian Armed Forces. She was awarded the Param Vishisht Seva Medal on 26 January 2026.

== Personal life ==
Sarin was born into a naval family; her father was a naval officer who served for 41 years and retired as a commander, while her brother Rajesh also served in the navy for 30 years. A submariner, Rajesh retired as a commodore, having served as the Commodore Commanding Submarines (East) besides commanding three submarines and a frigate. Her sister-in-law was also a doctor in the navy.

Sarin is married to Surgeon Rear Admiral C. S. Naidu, AVSM, VSM, a hepatobiliary surgeon who served in the navy for 38 years. In 2020, in a first, the couple served as the Command Medical Officers (CMO) of naval commands. While Vice Admiral Sarin served as the CMO of the Southern Naval Command, Rear Admiral Naidu was the CMO of the Eastern Naval Command. The couple has a son.

== Awards and decorations ==
Sarin has been awarded with the Ati Vishisht Seva Medal in 2024 and the Vishisht Seva Medal in 2021. She has also been awarded with Chief of the Naval Staff Commendation Card in 2001, the General Officer Commanding-in-Chief commendation in 2013, the Chief of the Army Staff commendation in 2017.

Param Vishisht Seva Medal	Ati Vishisht Seva Medal	Vishisht Seva Medal	Operation Vijay Medal
Sainya Seva Medal	75th Anniversary of Independence Medal	50th Anniversary of Independence Medal	30 Years Long Service Medal
	20 Years Long Service Medal	9 Years Long Service Medal	

== Dates of Rank ==
Insignia	Rank	Appointment	Component	Date of rank
	Lieutenant	—N/a	Indian Army	26 December 1985
	Captain	—N/a	Indian Army	3 December 1986
	Surgeon Lieutenant Commander	—N/a	Indian Navy	3 December 1991
	Surgeon Commander	—N/a	Indian Navy	14 January 2000
	Surgeon Captain	—N/a	Indian Navy	1 September 2008
	Surgeon Commodore	Senior Registrar of INHS Asvini	Indian Navy	2018
	Surgeon Rear Admiral	Command Medical Officer, Southern Naval Command	Indian Navy	2 March 2020
	Surgeon Rear Admiral	Commanding Officer, INHS Asvini	Indian Navy	2 March 2020
	Surgeon Vice Admiral	Director of Armed Forces Medical College	Indian Navy	5 October 2022
	Air Marshal	Director General Medical Services (Air)	Indian Air Force	10 January 2023
	Surgeon Vice Admiral	Director General Medical Services (Navy)	Indian Navy	25 March 2023
	Surgeon Vice Admiral	Director General Armed Forces Medical Services	Indian Armed Forces (tri-service)	1 October 2024

== See also ==
- Women in the Indian Armed Forces
- Punita Arora
- Padma Bandopadhyay
- Madhuri Kanitkar
- Sheila S. Mathai
- Rajshree Ramasethu

Military offices
Preceded by Sheila S. Mathai	Commanding Officer INHS Asvini; 2021-2021	Succeeded by Anupam Kapur
Preceded by Lieutenant General Rajshree Ramasethu	Commandant Armed Forces Medical College; 2022-2023	Succeeded by Lieutenant General Narendra Kotwal
Preceded by Lieutenant General Daljit SIngh	Director General Armed Forces Medical Services; 2024-2026	Succeeded by Air Marshal Sandeep Thareja
