= Sadhna =

Sadhna may refer to:

- Sadhna (film), 1958 film
- Sadhna News, Hindi-language News television channel
- Sadhna Pass, mountain pass in India
- Sadhna Saxena Nair, former general officer of the Indian Army
- Naam yog Sadhna Mandir, temple in Mathura, India

== See also ==
- Sadhana (disambiguation)
