= Kavita Sahai =

Indian woman general of Army medical corps

Surgeon Vice Admiral Kavita Sahai AVSM, SM, VSM
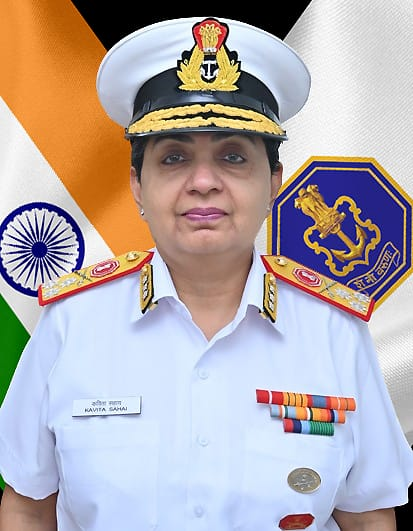
- Allegiance: India
- Branch: Indian Navy
- Service years: December 1985 - 30 April 2026
- Rank: Surgeon Vice Admiral
- Service number: 76819-N
- Awards: Sena Medal; Vishisht Seva Medal
- Education: Armed Forces Medical College; Indian Naval Academy

Surgeon Vice Admiral Kavita Sahai, SM, VSM is a retired flag officer in the Indian Navy. She is the eighth woman in the Indian Armed Forces to be promoted to a Three-star rank, and the fourth to hold the rank of Vice Admiral. She last served as the Director General Medical Services (Navy). She earlier served as the Commandant Army Medical Corps Centre and College, Lucknow.

== Career ==
Sahai was commissioned in the Army Medical Corps in December 1986 after graduating from Armed Forces Medical College. In 1994, she did her Doctor of Medicine in pathology and Diplomate of National Board in Pathology in 1997.

An alumnus of the Armed Forces Medical College Pune, Sahai has specialized in Pathology and super specialized in Oncopathology from the prestigious AIIMS, New Delhi. She has been Professor and head of Dept, Lab Sciences at Army Hospital Research and Referral (AHRR) and Base Hospital Delhi Cantt (BHDC). She has also been Professor at Dept of Pathology, Armed Forces Medical College (AFMC), Pune.

Prior to assuming charge as the DGMS (Navy), she was the First woman Commandant of AMC Centre & College and Officer-in-Charge Records. She is the first woman officer to be elected as Colonel Commandant of Army Medical Corps. She has a special interest in Medical Education and was awarded prestigious Foundation for Advancement of International Medical Education and Research (FAIMER) Fellowship for advancement of Med Education from Philadelphia, USA in 2013-14.

== Awards ==
In recognition for her distinguished Service, Sahai has been awarded the Sena Medal in 2024 and Vishisht Seva Medal in 2018 and has been Commended by the Chief of the Army Staff (COAS) twice in 2008 & 2012 and the GOC-in-C (WC) in 2010.

Ati Vishisht Seva Medal	Sena Medal	Vishisht Seva Medal	Special Service Medal
Sainya Seva Medal	75th Anniversary of Independence Medal	50th Anniversary of Independence Medal	30 Years Long Service Medal
20 Years Long Service Medal		9 Years Long Service Medal	
