= Kamala Balakrishnan =

Indian military officer and immunologist (1930–2018)

- Kamala Balakrishnan, from the website of the American Society for Histocompatibility and Immunogenetics.
- Born: January 16, 1930
- Died: August 7, 2018 (aged 88); Houston, Texas
- Occupation(s): Military officer, medical researcher

Kamala Balakrishnan (January 16, 1930 – August 7, 2018) was an Indian military officer and immunologist. She was a lieutenant colonel in the Indian Armed Forces, president of the American Society of Histocompatibility and Immunogenetics (ASHI), and director of the Transplantation Immunology Division at the Paul Hoxworth Blood Center in Cincinnati, Ohio.

== Early life ==
Balakrishnan was born in 1930. She graduated from the Christian Medical College in Vellore, and completed a diploma in clinical pathology from the Armed Forces Medical College at Pune. She pursued further studies in immunology at the University of Birmingham, in 1967 and 1968.

== Career ==
Balakrishnan was a lieutenant colonel and senior medical officer in the Indian Armed Forces. She established India's first histocompatibility laboratory, in New Delhi. She was awarded the Shakuntala Devi Amir Chand Award in 1971, and the Colonel Amir Chand Award in 1973, both from the Indian Council of Medical Research. In the 1980s, she supported the work of the Bangalore Medical Services Trust, consulting on laboratory set up and personnel training for blood banks.

In the United States, Balakrishnan was president of the American Society of Histocompatibility and Immunogenetics from 1996 to 1997. From 1981 to 2001, she was director of the Transplantation Immunology Division at the Paul Hoxworth Blood Center in Cincinnati, Ohio. She was a professor of transfusion medicine at the University of Cincinnati, and contributed to research articles in academic journals including The New England Journal of Medicine, Lupus, Nephron, Transfusion, Immunological Investigations, Journal of Surgical Research, and Human Immunology. She also contributed to a textbook, Transfusion Immunology and Medicine (1995).

== Personal life ==
Balakrishnan was married to a fellow military officer, Vataranyan Balakrishnan; they had two sons. She died in 2018, at a hospital in Houston, Texas. There are photographs of Balakrishnan in the University of Cincinnati Medical School/University Hospital Public Relations Photographic Collection at the Henry R. Winkler Center for the History of the Health Professions in Cincinnati.
