= Punita Arora =

Indian military officer

Surgeon Vice Admiral Punita Arora PVSM, SM, VSM
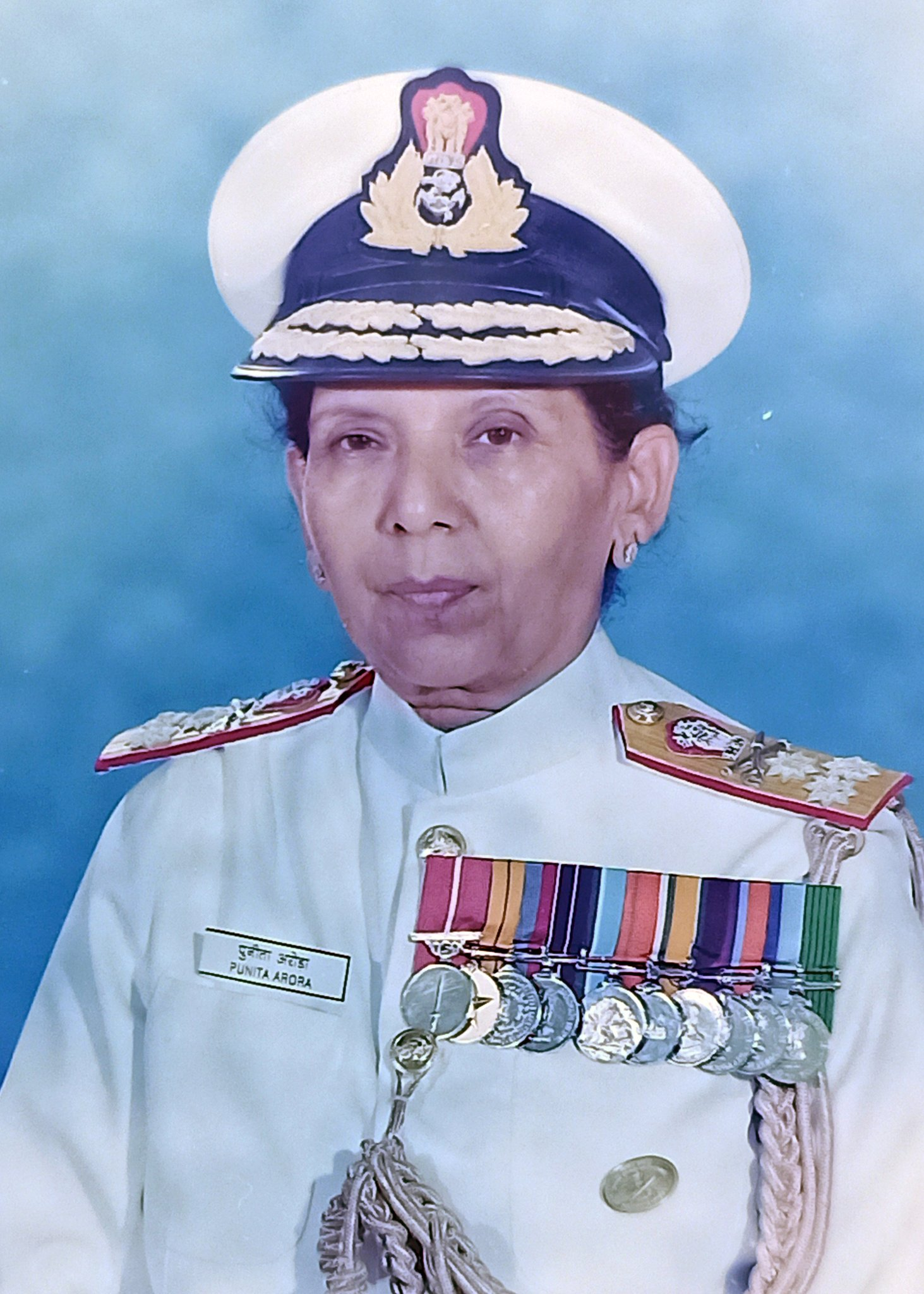
- Born: May 31, 1946 (age 80); Lahore, Punjab, British India
- Military career
- Allegiance: India
- Branch: Indian Army; Indian Navy
- Rank: Vice Admiral
- Commands: Armed Forces Medical College
- Awards: Param Vishisht Seva Medal; Sena Medal; Vishisht Seva Medal

Surgeon Vice Admiral (Lieutenant General) Punita Arora PVSM, SM, VSM is a former Flag Officer of the Indian Navy and the Indian Army. Arora was the first woman in the Indian Armed Forces to be promoted to a Three-star rank. She held the ranks of Lieutenant General in the Indian Army and Surgeon Vice Admiral in the Indian Navy.

== Early life ==
She was born into a Punjabi family which hails from Lahore. When she was only one-year-old, her family moved to India during partition and got settled in Saharanpur, Uttar Pradesh.

== Education ==
She studied in Sophia School in Saharanpur till 8th grade. After that she moved to Guru Nanak Girls Inter-College. In 11th standard while getting admitted to Government school for boys she decided to take Science as a career. She joined Armed Forces Medical College, Pune in 1963 which was the second batch of the AFMC and she turned out to be the topper of that batch.

== Career ==
Punita Arora was commissioned in January 1968. Before becoming Surgeon Vice Admiral of Indian Navy she was Commandant of AFMC. She took the charge of commandant of Armed Forces Medical College on 1 September 2004 thereafter becoming the first woman officer to command the medical college. Before that she was co-ordinating Medical Research of the armed forces at the Army headquarters as additional director-general of Armed Forces Medical Services (Medical Research). She moved from the Army to the Navy as the AFMS has a common pool which allows officers to migrate from one service to another depending on the requirement.

== Awards and medals ==
She has been awarded with 15 medals in her 36 years of career in Indian Armed Forces.

Param Vishisht Seva Medal	Sena Medal (2006)		Vishisht Seva Medal (2002)
Special Service Medal	Sangram Medal	Sainya Seva Medal	50th Independence Anniversary Medal
25th Independence Anniversary Medal	30 Years Long Service Medal	20 Years Long Service Medal	9 Years Long Service Medal

- Vishisht Seva Medal for providing efficient and timely help to victims of the Kaluchak massacre.

== See also ==
- Women in the Indian Armed Forces
- Padma Bandopadhyay
- Madhuri Kanitkar
- Sheila S. Mathai
- Rajshree Ramasethu
- Arti Sarin
