= Sheila S. Mathai =

Indian admiral

Surgeon Vice Admiral Sheila S. Mathai NM, VSM
- Military career
- Allegiance: India
- Branch: Indian Navy
- Service years: 1985 – 2022
- Rank: Surgeon Vice Admiral
- Commands: INHS Asvini; Institute of Naval Medicine
- Awards: Nao Sena Medal; Vishisht Seva Medal

Surgeon Vice Admiral Sheila Samanta Mathai, NM, VSM is a former flag officer in the Indian Navy. She last served as the director general (organisation & personnel) of the Armed Forces Medical Services. She is the fourth woman in the Indian Armed Forces to be promoted to a three-star rank, after Surgeon Vice Admiral Punita Arora, Air Marshal Padma Bandopadhyay and Lieutenant General Madhuri Kanitkar. She is currently the head of the department of neonatology in Kasturba Medical College, Manipal.

== Early life and education ==
Mathai was born into an Armed Forces family. Her father was a surgeon in the Army Medical Corps. She attended the Loreto Schools, Kolkata. She lost her parents early and joined the Armed Forces Medical College, Pune (AFMC), her father's alma mater. At AFMC, she completed her MBBS and was awarded the Kalinga Trophy for the best outgoing student.

== Military career ==
Mathai was commissioned in the Indian Navy in 1985. She subsequently did her post-graduation, earning the Doctor of Medicine degree in pediatrics from the University of Mumbai. She then earned a DM degree in neonatology, also from the University of Mumbai. She was awarded a Commonwealth Visiting Fellowship to the UK in neonatology in 2003, and was conferred a Fellowship of the Foundation for Advancement of International Medical Education and Research (FAIMER) in 2014.

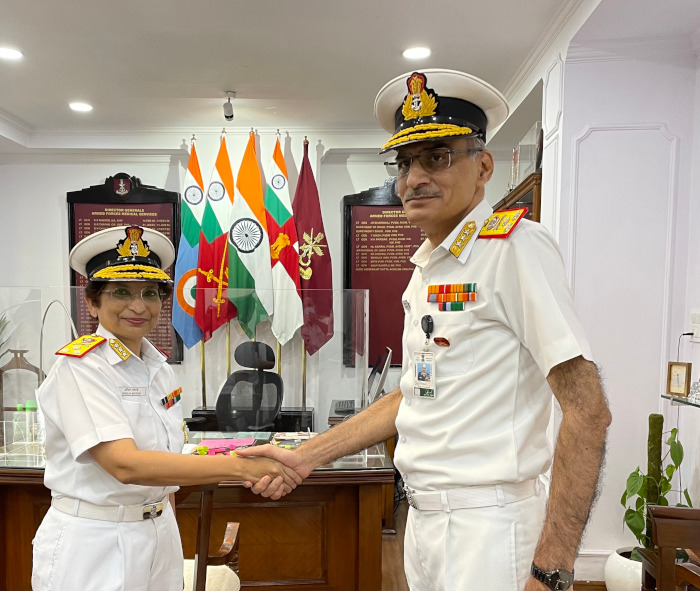
Surgeon Vice Admiral Sheila S. Mathai (left) with the DGAFMS surgeon vice admiral Rajat Datta.

Mathai has set up the paediatric departments at INHS Dhanvantari in Port Blair and at the INHS Jeevanti in Goa. She has also set up the neonatal intensive care units in service and cantonment hospitals in Mumbai and Pune. As a surgeon commodore, she served as the professor and head of the Department of Paediatrics at the Armed Forces Medical College, Pune. She subsequently served as the director and dean of the Institute of Naval Medicine in Mumbai, an institute headed by her husband in the past.

=== Flag rank ===
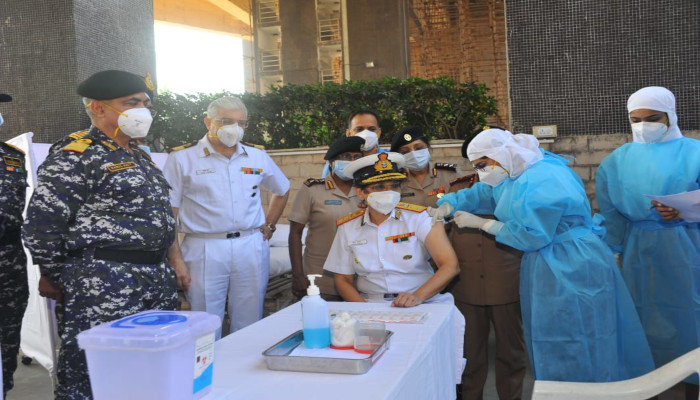
Surg RAdm Mathai receives the first dose of the COVID-19 vaccine at INHS Asvini.

Mathai was promoted to the rank of rear admiral and appointed command medical officer, Eastern Naval Command. She was subsequently appointed commanding officer of the naval hospital INHS Asvini in Mumbai. She was in command of the naval hospital during the COVID-19 pandemic. On 31 January 2021, she relinquished command of Asvini, handing over to Rear Admiral Arti Sarin, in a rare event of a change of command between two women flag officers. On 1 February, she took over as the command medical officer of the Western Naval Command.

On 26 August 2021, she was promoted to the rank of surgeon vice admiral, only the fourth woman to be promoted to three-star rank in the Indian Armed Forces. She assumed the post of director general (organisation and personnel) of the Armed Forces Medical Services under the Director General Armed Forces Medical Services (DGAFMS).

== Personal life ==
Mathai is married to an officer of the Indian Navy, Surgeon Commodore K. I. Mathai, VSM, a neurosurgeon who served in the navy for 35 years and is now retired. The couple have a daughter.

== Awards and decorations ==
Mathai has been awarded the Chief of the Naval Staff Commendation Card in 1993, the Vishisht Seva Medal in 2012, and the Nao Sena Medal in 2021.

Nao Sena Medal	Vishisht Seva Medal	Sainya Seva Medal	50th Anniversary of Independence Medal
30 Years Long Service Medal	20 Years Long Service Medal		9 Years Long Service Medal

== See also ==
- Women in the Indian Armed Forces
- Punita Arora
- Padma Bandopadhyay
- Madhuri Kanitkar
- Rajshree Ramasethu
- Arti Sarin
