= Sadhana (disambiguation) =

Sādhanā is a Sanskrit term for "a means to accomplish something" used in Hindu and Buddhist traditions.

Sadhana may also refer to:

== People ==
- Sadhana Shivdasani, an Indian Bollywood actress (known mononymously as Sadhana)
- Sadhana (Malayalam actress), an Indian actress in Malayalam films during the 1960s and 1970s
- Sadhana Naithani, Indian folklorist and post-colonial theorist
- Sadhana Sargam, an Indian playback singer
- Bhagat Sadhana, North Indian Muslim poet, saint, mystic and one of the devotees whose hymn is present in Guru Granth Sahib

== Media and literature ==
- Sadhana, a magazine edited between 1891 and 1895 by Bengali writer Rabindranath Tagore
- Sadhana: The Realization of Life, a collection of essays published in 1913 by Bengali writer Rabindranath Tagore
- Sadhana (weekly), a weekly Marathi-language publication established in 1948

== Other usages ==
- Sadhana, practice of classical music
- Sādhanā (journal), a peer-reviewed journal of engineering and applied science published by the Indian Academy of Sciences

== See also ==
- Sadhna (disambiguation)
