= Madhuri Kanitkar =

Indian general

Lieutenant General Dr. Madhuri Kanitkar PVSM, AVSM, VSM
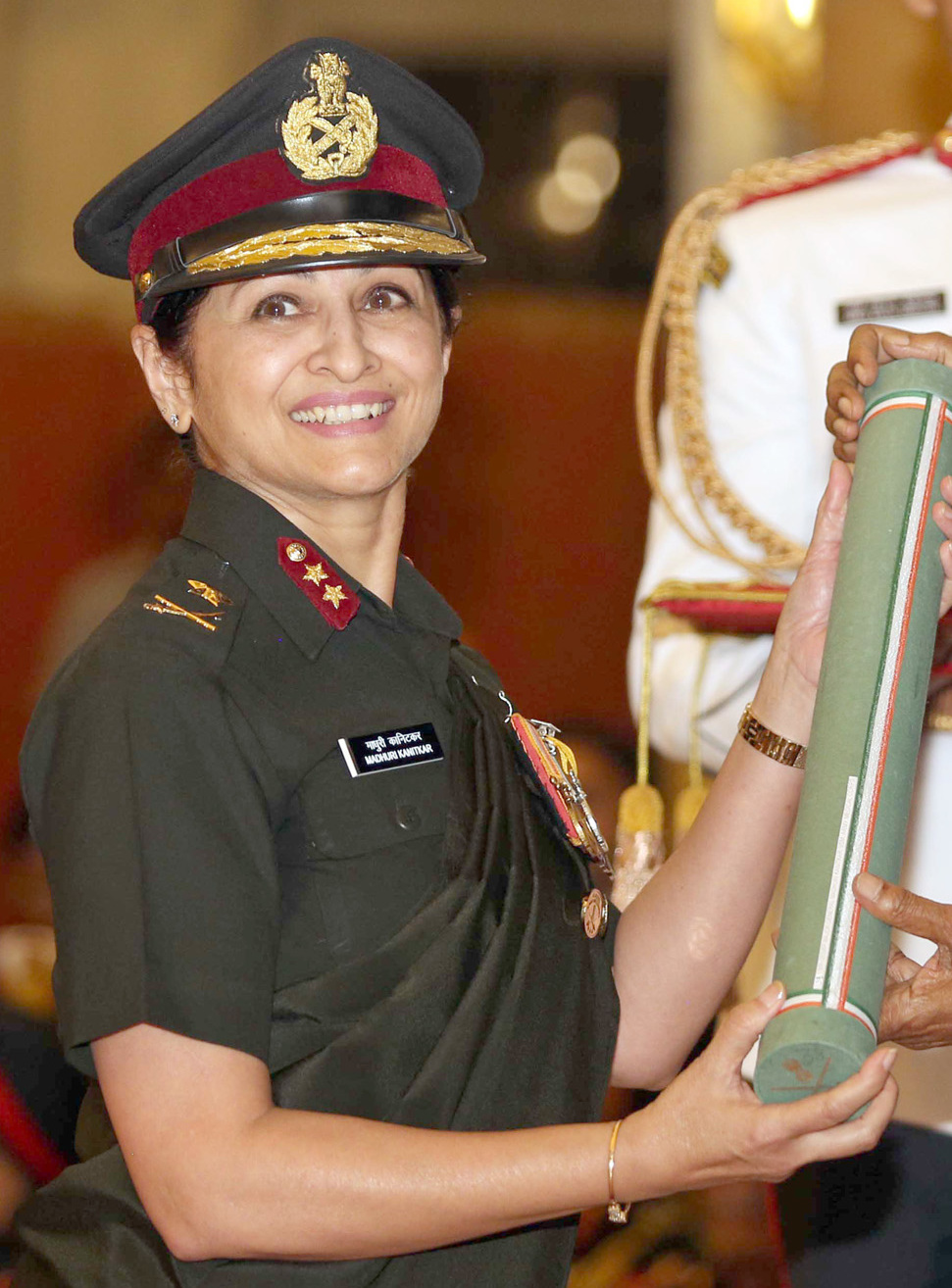
- Lt Gen Kanitkar as DCIDS (Med)
- Born: October 15, 1960 (age 66)
- Alma mater: AFMC (MBBS, MD Pediatrics)
- Military career
- Allegiance: India
- Branch: Indian Army
- Service years: 1982 – 2021
- Rank: Lieutenant General
- Unit: Army Medical Corps (AMC)
- Awards: Param Vishisht Seva Medal; Ati Vishisht Seva Medal; Vishisht Seva Medal

Lieutenant General Dr. Madhuri Kanitkar, PVSM, AVSM, VSM is a retired General Officer in the Indian Army. She is the third woman in the Indian Armed Forces to be promoted to a Three-star rank, after Surgeon Vice Admiral Punita Arora and Air Marshal Padma Bandopadhyay. She last served as the Deputy Chief of Integrated Defence Staff (Medical) under the Chief of Defence Staff.

Kanitkar serves on the Prime Minister's Science, Technology and Innovation Advisory Council (PM-STIAC). On 6 July 2021, she was appointed the Vice-Chancellor of the Maharashtra University of Health Sciences, Nashik by the Governor of Maharashtra. She took over this appointment after retiring from the Army in October 2021.

== Early life and education ==
She was born into a Goud Saraswat Brahmin family, with three daughters, in Dharwad, Karnataka in 1960. Her grandmother and grandfather were both medical doctors. She joined the Armed Forces Medical College, Pune in 1978. She placed first in Pune University in all three phases of her MBBS. She was awarded the President's Gold Medal for the best outgoing student of the graduate wing in academics and extra-curricular activities, apart from the Kalinga Trophy for excellence in academics.

== Military career ==
Kanitkar was commissioned in the Army Medical Corps in December 1982. She did her post-graduation in 1990, earning the Doctor of Medicine degree in Pediatrics. Post that she underwent training in Pediatric Nephrology at the All India Institute of Medical Sciences, New Delhi. Kanitkar has also completed fellowships at the National University Hospital, Singapore and the Great Ormond Street Hospital, London and the FAIMER fellowship in Medical Education.

She has tenanted appointments of associate professor, professor and Head of Department of Pediatrics at the Armed Forces Medical College, Pune. She has also served as a Professor at the Army College of Medical Sciences and at the Army hospital (Research & Referral). Kanitkar was instrumental in setting up the first Pediatric Nephrology service in the Army Medical Corps and has served as the President of The Indian Society of Pediatric Nephrology. Kanitkar has served as the Deputy Director General Armed Forces Medical Services (Dy DGAFMS) in the office of the DGAFMS in New Delhi.

On 28 January 2017, she assumed the office of Dean and Deputy Commandant of her alma-mater Armed Forces Medical College, Pune. Kanitkar then served as Major General Medical at the Northern Command at Udhampur. Kanitkar was promoted to the rank of Lieutenant General on 29 February 2020. The Director General Armed Forces Medical Services (DGAFMS) and her husband pipped the epaulettes of her new rank.

== Personal life ==
Her husband, Lieutenant General Rajeev Kanitkar, is a retired General Officer and last served as the Quartermaster General of the Indian Army. They are the first couple in the Indian Armed Forces to achieve the three-star rank.

== Awards and decorations ==
Kanitkar has been awarded the GOC-in-C Commendation Card once and the Chief of the Army Staff Commendation Card five times. She was also awarded the Vishisht Seva Medal in 2014, the Ati Vishisht Seva Medal in 2018, and the Param Vishisht Seva Medal in January 2022.

Param Vishisht Seva Medal	Ati Vishisht Seva Medal		Vishisht Seva Medal
Special Service Medal	50th Anniversary of Independence Medal	20 Years Long Service Medal	9 Years Long Service Medal

== See also ==
- Women in the Indian Armed Forces
- Punita Arora
- Padma Bandopadhyay
- Sheila S. Mathai
- Rajshree Ramasethu
- Arti Sarin
