= Padma Bandopadhyay =

First woman Air Marshal of the Indian Air Force

Air Marshal Padmavathy Bandopadhyay PVSM, AVSM, VSM, PHS
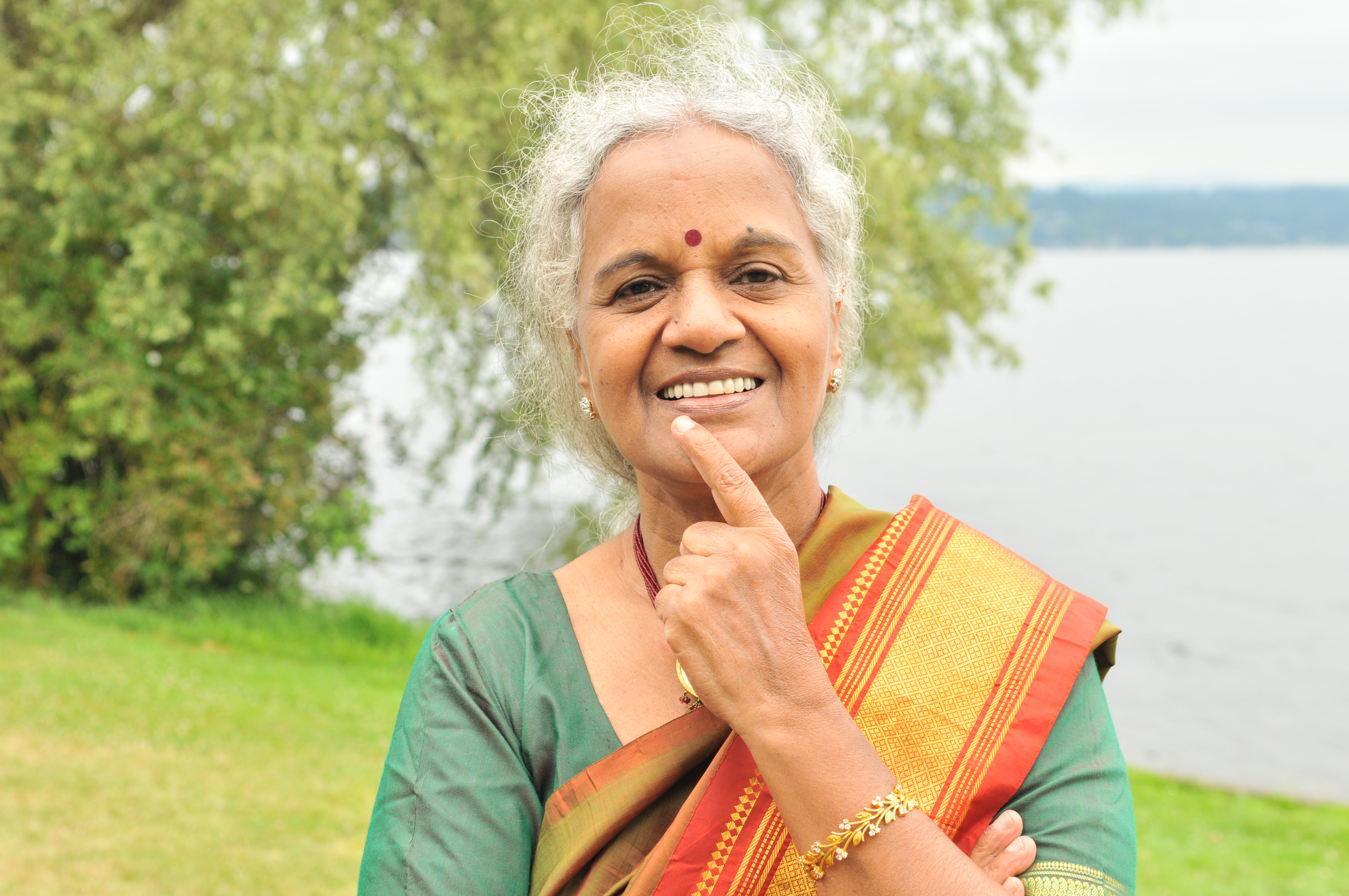
- Bandopadhyay in 2012
- Born: Padmavathy Swaminathan; 4 November 1944 (age 81); Tirupathi, Madras Presidency, British India (now Andhra Pradesh)
- Alma mater: Armed Forces Medical College, Pune
- Spouse: Wg Cdr Sati Nath Bandopadhyay (m. 1968–2015; his death)
- Children: 2
- Military career
- Allegiance: India
- Branch: Indian Air Force
- Service years: 1968–2005
- Rank: Air Marshal
- Nickname: Padma
- Service number: 11528 MED (MR-2246)
- Commands: DGMS(Air)
- Awards: PVSM, AVSM, VSM, Padma Shri

Air Marshal Padma Bandopadhyay, PVSM, AVSM, VSM, PHS (born 4 November 1944) is a decorated former flight surgeon in the Indian Air Force. She was the first woman to be promoted to the rank of Air Marshal in the Indian Air Force. She is the second woman in the Indian Armed Forces to be promoted to a three-star rank, after Surgeon Vice Admiral Punita Arora.

== Early life ==
Bandopadhyay was born as Padmavathy Swaminathan on 4 November 1944 at Tirupathi, Andhra Pradesh into a Tamil speaking Iyer family. When Padma was four or five years old, her mother contracted tuberculosis and eventually became bedridden. As a result, Padma's thoughts have been consumed with medical difficulties since she was a small child, and she also took on the role of her mother's primary caretaker while she was still quite young. In addition, her neighbor in the Gole Market neighborhood in New Delhi was Dr. S. I. Padmavati, Professor of Medicine at Lady Hardinge Medical College. Padma has said that her experience with her mother's illness and hospitalisation at Safdarjung Hospital, and having a neighbouring lady doctor with the same name as her were early motivations to become a doctor.

== Education ==
She studied at Delhi Tamil Education Association Senior Secondary Schools in the humanities stream. After graduating from school, she made the difficult and uncommon transition from humanities to the science stream in Delhi University. She studied pre-medical at Kirori Mal College and then joined the Armed Forces Medical College, Pune, in 1963.

== Career ==
She joined the Indian Air Force in 1968. She married Wing Commander S. N. Bandopadhyay, a fellow air force officer. She was awarded the Vishisht Seva Medal (VSM) for her conduct during the Indo-Pakistani War of 1971. Sati Nath and Padma were the first IAF couple to receive a President's award in the same investiture parade.

She was the first woman to become a Fellow of the Aerospace Medical Society of India and the first Indian woman to conduct scientific research at the North Pole. She is also the first woman Armed Forces officer to have completed the Defence Services Staff College course in 1978. She was the Director General Medical Services (Air) at the Air Headquarters. In 2002, she became the first woman to be promoted to air vice marshal (two-star rank). She subsequently became the first woman air marshal of Indian Air Force. Bandopadhyay is an aviation medicine specialist and a member of the New York Academy of Sciences.

== Military awards and decorations ==

Param Vishisht Seva Medal	Ati Vishisht Seva Medal	Vishisht Seva Medal	Paschimi Star
Sangram Medal	Operation Vijay Medal	High Altitude Service Medal	50th Anniversary of Independence Medal
25th Anniversary of Independence Medal	30 Years Long Service Medal	20 Years Long Service Medal	9 Years Long Service Medal

== Awards and honors ==
- Vishist Seva Medal, January 1973
- Indira Priyadarshini award
- Ati Vishist Seva Medal, January 2002
- Param Vishist Seva Medal, January 2006
- Padma Shree Award, January 2020

== See also ==
- Women in the Indian Armed Forces
- Punita Arora
- Madhuri Kanitkar
- Sheila S. Mathai
- Rajshree Ramasethu
- Arti Sarin
