= Sonali Mishra =

Indian IPS officer

Director General of Railway Protection Force
- In office 1 August 2025 – 31 October 2026
- Preceded by: Manoj Yadava
- Succeeded by: Jitendra Kumar

Personal details
- Born: 9 October 1966 (age 60)
- Occupation: IPS
- Police career
- Department: Railway Protection Force
- Service years: 1993 - present
- Rank: Director General

Sonali Mishra (born 9 October 1966) is a retired IPS officer (1993 Batch) of the Madhya Pradesh cadre. She served as the Director General of Railway Protection Force from 1 August 2025 till 31 October 2026, becoming the first woman to lead the 143-year-old security force.
