= Ruchi Sharma =

Indian Army paratrooper and educationist

Captain Ruchi Sharma
- Military career
- Allegiance: India
- Branch: Indian Army
- Rank: Captain
- Units: Army Ordnance Corps; Parachute Regiment
- Awards: Presidents Gold Medal; General Oberoi Trophy

Captain Ruchi Sharma is a former paratrooper in the Indian Army. She retired from the Army in 2003 and is now an educationist.

== Life ==
Ruchi Sharma was a 1995 batch science student of Mehr Chand Mahajan DAV College for Women. Both Sharma and her father, an Indian Army officer, are alumni of Officers’ Training Academy, Chennai. Sharma joined the army in 1996, (Note: Only 4 years prior had Indian women been allowed in combat roles on an "experimental basis") when she was 20 years old, as a Short Service Commission officer and was commissioned to the Army Ordnance Corps. She volunteered to become a paratrooper. In an interview to Femina magazine she remembers that during training they were made to jog for 40 km with a 10 kg load. Her first jump was in 1997. About her first jump she says, "The first jump is like your first love"; in an Indian Express article she is quoted saying, "I was screaming my parents' names, telling them that I love them,” and adding, "but when I landed, my 'ustad' burst my bubble saying the enemy will know my position if I screamed so much everytime I jumped." Sharma went on to earn the maroon beret and serve in areas such as Ladakh. In 1999, she won the "General Oberoi Trophy" for "Best Women Adventurer" from her corps, and later on went on to be awarded the "Presidents Gold Medal".

Captain Sharma retired in 2003. She says that if the policy of permanent commission for women had been there back in her days, she would have opted for it. In 2020, on the occasion of International Women's Day, Prime Minister Narendra Modi’s made a social media appeal to bring forward inspirational stories. One of the stories was highlighted was that of Captain Ruchi Sharma. In 2003 she left the forces so as to be able to look after her daughter. Ruchi Sharma, now an educationist, is married to an army officer, and they have a daughter.
