= Medical Journal Armed Forces India =

- Discipline: Medicine
- Language: English
- Edited by: Col Vivek Aggarwal

Publication details
- Former name: Journal of Indian Army Medical Corps
- History: 1945-present
- Publisher: Elsevier on behalf of the Armed Forces Medical Services of India
- Frequency: bimonthly

Standard abbreviations
- ISO 4: Med J Armed Forces India

Indexing
- ISSN: 0377-1237 (print); 2213-4743 (web)
- OCLC no.: 66467028

Links
- Journal homepage; Online access; Online archive (1994-present); Journal page at publisher's website

Medical Journal Armed Forces India is a bimonthly peer-reviewed medical journal covering all disciplines of medical science. It is published by Elsevier on behalf of the Armed Forces Medical Services of India and the editor-in-chief is Col Vivek Aggarwal. The journal was established in 1945 as Journal of Indian Army Medical Corps, obtaining its current name in 1974.

== Abstracting and indexing ==
The journal is abstracted and indexed in PubMed, CAB Abstracts, Embase, and Scopus.
