= INHS Asvini =

Indian naval hospital

Coordinates: 18.9007°N 72.8160°E

Indian Naval Hospital Ship Asvini
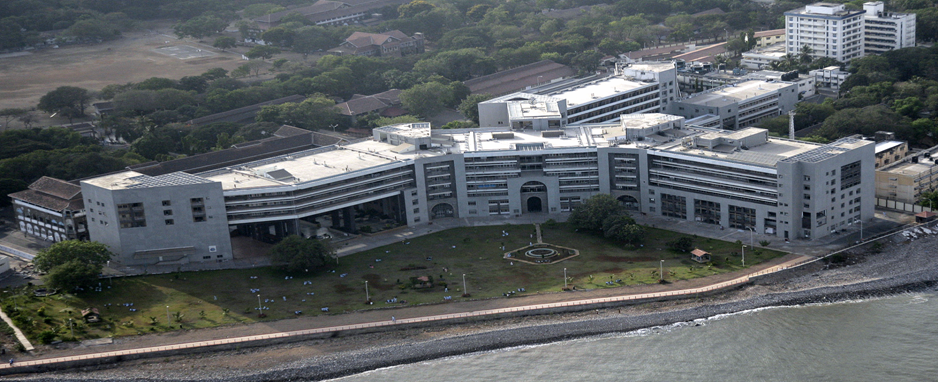
- Aerial view of INHS Asvini
- Founded: 18 September 1951
- Country: India
- Branch: Indian Navy
- Type: Hospital
- Role: Medical, combat support
- Part of: Western Naval Command; Armed Forces Medical Services
- Nickname: INHS Asvini
- Mottos: Caring and Curing

Commanders
- Current commander: Surgeon Rear Admiral Rohit Sharma

The INHS Asvini is a hospital of the Indian Navy in Mumbai. With 825 beds, the tertiary care institution is the oldest and largest hospital of the Indian Navy. Established as the King's Seamen Hospital in 1756, it was christened INHS Asvini in 1951 and accorded the status of a Command Hospital in 1977.

== History ==
In 1756, the King’s Seamen Hospital started functioning in the naval barracks for in-patients in Colaba. The hospital was converted into a convalescent home in 1766. In 1860, the Hawa Mahal was built as the main ward of the hospital. It was transferred to the Indian Army when Her Majesty's Indian Navy was transitioned into the Bombay Marine. Under the Army, the Military Hospital, Colaba was expanded over the next century, including the addition of a family hospital in 1929.

On 18 September 1951, the Indian Army handed the hospital over to the Indian Navy and the establishment was commissioned as INHS Asvini. In July 1954, the sick berth school was established, followed by the Naval Dental Centre in 1961. The School of Nursing was set up in 1963. The sick berth school was renamed School of Medical Assistants (SOMA) in 1967. By 1966, Asvini was a 600-bedded hospital and further expanded to become an 825-bedded hospital in January 1977 when it was classified as a Command Hospital.

The Institute of Naval Medicine (INM) was established in 1964 as the Naval Medical Research and Training Centre (NMRTC) and renamed INM in 1974. It is the nodal agency to coordinate all the research projects of the Navy in the Armed Forces Medical Research Committee (AFMRC) and the Defence Research and Development Organisation (DRDO). INM was placed under Asvini in 2004.

== Crest ==
The hospital has been named after the mythological twin brothers, the Ashvini Kumaras, Celestial Physicians of the gods. The crest of INHS Asvini has the two Asvini brothers riding in their traditional horse cart holding medicine pots in their hands.

== Today ==
Today, Asvini is equipped with latest state-of-the-art medical facilities to provide holistic and comprehensive secondary and tertiary care to serving personnel, veterans and their families. It also acts as a referral centre to peripheral hospitals located in Maharashtra, Goa and Gujarat area. As a major military hospital, it renders the facilities of a super-speciality hospital with care-units in diverse fields of need. Asvini has been awarded the Defence Minister’s trophy for the Best Command Hospital in 2005, 2010, 2012, 2016 and 2024.

== Specialized medical capabilities ==
INHS Asvini operates super-specialty departments, including cardiology, neurosurgery, and oncology. The facility also provides naval-specific medical care, including aviation medicine and diving and hyperbaric medicine, which are utilized for naval aviators and marine commandos (MARCOS).

== Role in emergencies ==
Beyond routine clinical care, the hospital participates in national emergency response protocols. During the 2008 Mumbai attacks, the facility was placed on high alert and prepared to receive casualties. During the COVID-19 pandemic, the facility was designated as a dedicated 300-bed COVID care center, supporting the public health infrastructure of Mumbai.

== Organisation ==
The hospital is headed by the Commanding Officer, a two-star officer of the rank of Rear Admiral. On 31 January 2021, in a rare event of a change of command between two women flag officers, Surgeon Rear Admiral Arti Sarin took over command from Surgeon Rear Admiral Sheila S. Mathai. INHS Asvini also functions as a teaching institution. It is affiliated with the Maharashtra University of Health Sciences (MUHS) and the University of Mumbai, offering postgraduate (MD/MS) and super-specialty (DM/MCh) degree programs to military medical officers.

== Notable members ==
1. Surgeon Vice Admiral Sheila S. Mathai
2. Surgeon Vice Admiral Arti Sarin

== See also ==
- List of Armed Forces Hospitals In India
- Armed Forces Medical Services

== Bibliography ==
- Doraibabu, M; Godbole, Amrut Dilip (2023), A Decade of Transformation: The Indian Navy 2011-2021, HarperCollins Publishers India, ISBN 978-9394407909
- Singh, Anup (2018), Blue Waters Ahoy!: The Indian Navy 2001-2010, HarperCollins Publishers India, ISBN 978-9353025526
