= Shanti Tigga =

Shanti Tigga was the first female jawan in the Indian Army. Her fitness and skill surpassed that of her male colleagues, following which she was awarded the title of Best Trainee in the Recruitment Training Camp. She was found dead on May 13, 2013.

== Early life ==
Shanti Tigga hailed from the Jalpaiguri district in West Bengal. She belonged to a socially marginalized Scheduled Tribe community. Several members of her family and community had been enlisted in various factions of the defence forces, which was what provided her the impetus to break glass ceilings when she enlisted in the army at age 35. She was victim to a child marriage, and spent most of her early life in the role of a housewife and mother, having given birth to two children.

== Career ==
When Shanti Tigga's husband died, she was granted a Railway job as compensation. She joined the Indian Railways in 2005 and continued to work at the Chalsa station of Bengal's Jalpaiguri district for the next five years. In 2011, she signed up to join the 969 Railway Engineer Regiment of Territorial Army. Up until then, women were allowed to join the armed forces in non-combat roles, in the role of officers – a fact that Tigga was not aware of. When she did find out, she said that it was "hardly a deterrent". Tigga became the first woman jawan in the 1.3 million strong defence forces.

Tigga is said to have outperformed her male colleagues in the Recruitment Training Camp. She took five seconds less than the men to complete the 1.5 km run, and completed the 50m run in 12 seconds, which was rated as excellent by senior officials. She impressed her firing officers with her handling of guns, and was awarded the highest position of a marksman. She was also awarded the title of best trainee.

== Abduction and death ==
On May 9, 2013, Tigga was abducted by unknown perpetrators and found tied to a post by a railway track. She was hospitalized following this ordeal, and her hospital cabin was provided with security while a police investigation began. One week later, Tigga was found hanging in a railway hospital on May 13, 2013. Her son, who was also in the cabin, raised the alarm after she didn't come out for a long time. The case was ruled to be a suicide by police authorities.
