= Sadhna Saxena Nair =

Indian Army officer

Lieutenant General Sadhna Saxena Nair AVSM VSM
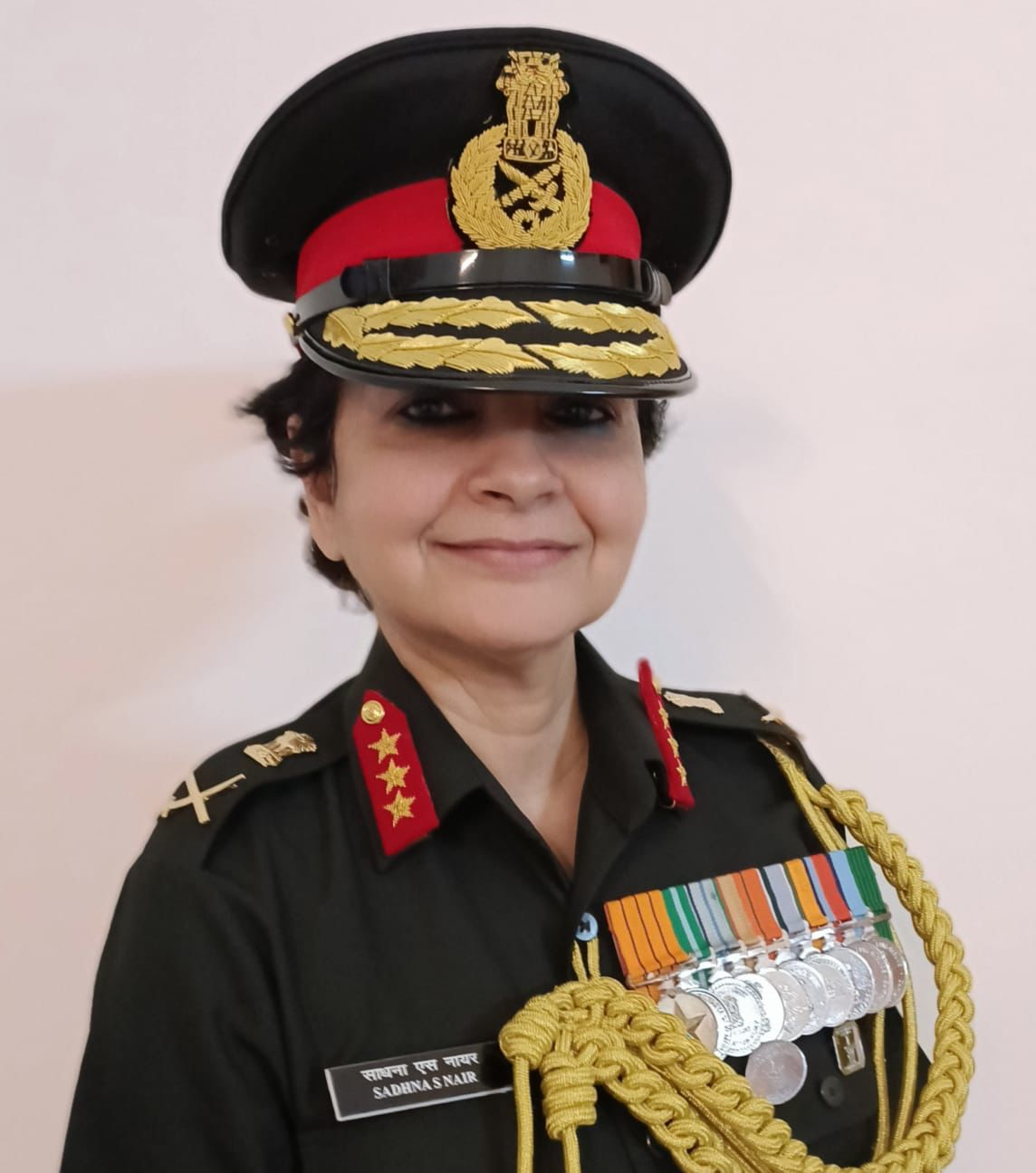
- Alma mater: Armed Forces Medical College
- Spouse: Air Marshal K P Nair
- Military career
- Allegiance: India
- Branch: Indian Army
- Service years: December 1985 - 30 September 2025
- Rank: Lieutenant General
- Service number: MR-05977W
- Awards: Ati Vishisht Seva Medal; Vishisht Seva Medal

Lieutenant General Sadhna Saxena Nair, AVSM, VSM is a former general officer of the Indian Army. She last served as the Director General Medical Services (Army) becoming the first woman officer to be appointed to the position. She was the seventh woman officer to be promoted to three-star rank in the Indian Armed Forces. Prior to that, she was also the first woman to hold the post of Director General Hospital Services (Armed Forces), in the rank of Air Marshal. She and her husband Air Marshal K P Nair became the first couple of the Indian Air Force being promoted to Air Marshal. Their younger son is a fighter pilot in the IAF (present rank: Squadron Leader) .

== Early life and education ==
The ranked officer graduated from the Armed Forces Medical College, Pune with a distinguished academic record. She holds a Post Graduate degree in Family Medicine, Diploma in Maternal & Child Health and Health Care Management, and has undergone a two-year training programme in Medical Informatics at AIIMS, New Delhi. She was trained in Chemical, Biological, Radiological and Nuclear Warfare with the Israeli Defence Forces and in Military Medical Ethics with the Swiss Armed Forces in Spiez.

== Military career ==
Lieutenant General Sadhna Saxena Nair was commissioned into the Army Medical Corps in December 1985 from Armed Forces Medical College, Pune. She has served as the first woman Principal Medical Officer of Western Air Command and Training Command of the Indian Air Force. On promotion to the rank of Air Marshal, she took over as the Director General Hospital Services (Armed Forces) on 23 October, 2023 becoming the first woman officer to hold this position. On 1 August, 2024 she took over as the Director General Medical Services (Army) making her the first woman officer to hold the appointment of DGMS (Army).

== Awards and decorations ==
The General officer has been awarded with the Ati Vishisht Seva Medal in 2025 and the Vishisht Seva Medal. For her meritorious service, she has been awarded the Air Officer Commanding-in-Chief, Western Air Command and Chief of the Air Staff Commendations.

Ati Vishisht Seva Medal	Vishisht Seva Medal		Samanya Seva Medal
Operation Vijay Medal	Operation Parakram Medal	Sainya Seva Medal	75th Anniversary of Independence Medal
50th Anniversary of Independence Medal	30 Years Long Service Medal	20 Years Long Service Medal	9 Years Long Service Medal
