= Gertrude Alice Ram =

Indian general

Major General Gertrude Alice Ram, PVSM was the first female general officer of the Indian Army.

Ram was appointed as director of the Military Nursing Services on 27 August 1976. She retired on 31 December 1979.

Ram is a recipient of the Florence Nightingale Medal and the Param Vishisht Seva Medal.

She died in Mussoorie in April 2002.
