= Priya Jhingan =

Indian Army officer

Captain Priya Jhingan
- Military career
- Allegiance: India
- Branch: Indian Army
- Service years: 5
- Rank: Captain

Priya Jhingan was a female army officer in the Indian Army serving in the Judge Advocate General. Following her discharge she became a journalist and English teacher.

== Military career ==
Jhingan started her military training from 21 September 1992 along with 24 other lady cadets. The lady officers were serving in Indian Army for more than hundred years in Army Medical Corps and, Military Nursing service. But first batch of Lady cadets were inducted in supporting arms of the Indian Army on 6 March 1993. As a law graduate, she joined Corps of Judge Advocate General. After five years of short service Priya was released from Army in 1998.

== Life after release from the army ==
After retirement, Major Priya completed a bachelor's in journalism and mass communication and took up editing a weekly, Sikkim Express, in Gangtok. In 2013, she was one of the participants of Khatron Ke Khiladi Season 1.

In 2013 she joined the prestigious institution, The Lawrence School, Sanawar as an English teacher and a HOUSE MISTRESS. She is married to Lieutenant Colonel Manoj Malhotra who runs an adventure sports company named Pep Turf. The couple live in Chandigarh, India and have one son.

In August 2019, she along with seven female students and a female teacher of The Lawrence School, Sanawar, attempted to scaled Mount Kilimanjaro —the highest mountain in Africa. But the expedition was abandoned in the wake of COVID Epidemic.
