= Vijayalakshmi Ramanan =

Surgeon; Indian Air Force Officer (1924–2020)

Wing Commander Vijayalakshmi Ramanan
- Born: 27 February 1924; Madras, Madras Presidency, British India (now Chennai, Tamil Nadu, India)
- Died: 18 October 2020 (aged 96); Bengaluru, Karnataka, India
- Spouse: K. V. Ramanan
- Military career
- Allegiance: India
- Branch: Indian Air Force
- Service years: 1955 to 1979
- Rank: Wing commander
- Service number: 4971 MED (MR-3056)
- Awards: Vishisht Seva Medal

Vijayalakshmi Ramanan VSM (27 February 1924 – 18 October 2020) was an Indian physician and career army officer. She was the first woman to be commissioned as an Indian Air Force officer, and served as a surgeon in several military hospitals in India. She was a recipient of the army's Vishisht Seva Medal in 1977 and retired as a wing commander in 1979.

== Early life ==
Ramanan was born on 27 February 1924 in Madras (now Chennai). Her father T.D. Narayana Iyer was a World War I veteran and later a public health official in Madras. She trained as a doctor, earning her M.B.B.S degree after joining the Madras Medical College in 1943. As a student, she was a recipient of the Balfour Memorial Medal for Medicine and Prize for Surgery from the Madras University. She went on to earn an M.D. in obstetrics and gynecology and worked as a surgeon in Madras before joining the Indian military.

== Career ==
Ramanan joined the Indian Army Medical Corps in 1955 under a short-service commission. She went on to be seconded to the Indian Air Force, and was commissioned as its first female officer in 1971. In addition to working as a gynecologist in military hospitals in India, she also provided medical care to service members during wars in 1962, 1966 and 1971.

In 1968, she became the Senior Gynecologist and Obstetrician at the Air Force Hospital in Bangalore, Karnataka, and led military efforts to encourage family planning in the services. Ramanan became a flight lieutenant on 20 March 1953, and a wing commander on 22 August 1972. She served in armed forces hospitals in Jalahalli, Kanpur, Secunderabad and Bangalore. She also taught obstetrics and gynecology for nurse officers during this time.

Ramanan retired as a wing commander in 1979. She was the recipient of the Vishist Seva Medal, which is awarded to members of the Indian armed forces for "distinguished service of a high order" and was given to her on 26 January 1977 by the then Indian President Neelam Sanjiva Reddy for her treatment of women and children affiliated with the Indian armed forces. Ramanan was the first female officer to be commissioned in the Indian Air Force. She served in the Indian Air Force for 24 years prior to her retirement.

Speaking about her experiences as the first woman officer in the Indian Air Force, Ramanan had said, "For quite some years, I was the only lady officer in the air force. Initially, I was scared to work with men, but I was brave and thought to myself, I could face anything." With the Indian Air Force not having uniforms for women at the time of her joining, she is said to have custom tailored a sari and blouse with the air force colours that then became the standard issue for women officers.

== Personal life ==
Ramanan was also trained as a classical Carnatic musician and was an "A Grade" artist with All India Radio from age 15, broadcasting from Delhi, Lucknow, Secunderabad and Bangalore. She is survived by her two children Sukanya and Sukumar. Her husband, K. V. Ramanan, was also an Air Force officer.

She died of old age, at 96, at her daughter's home in Bangalore on 18 October 2020.
