= Armed Forces Medical College =

Medical college in Pune, Maharashtra, India

- सशस्त्र सेना चिकित्सा महाविद्यालय
- Crest of AFMC
- Motto: सर्वे सन्तु निरामयाः transl. Let all be free from disease and disability
- Type: Military Medical School
- Established: 1 May 1948 (78 years ago)
- Accreditation: NAAC; NABL
- Academic affiliations: MUHS; NMC
- Budget: ₹180.99 crore (US$19 million) (FY2022–23 est.)
- Dean: Maj. Gen. (Dr.) Atul Seth
- Commandant: Surg. Vice Adm. Manish Honwad
- Academic staff: 325 (2024)
- Students: 1,242 (2024)
- Undergraduates: 749 (2024)
- Postgraduates: 493 (2024)
- Location: Southern Command, Solapur Road, Wanowrie, Pune, Maharashtra, 411040, India; 18°30′25.64″N 73°53′31.09″E
- Campus: Urban, 190 acres (77 ha)
- Newspaper: Medical Journal Armed Forces India
- Acronym: AFMC
- Colors: Maroon
- Website: afmc.nic.in

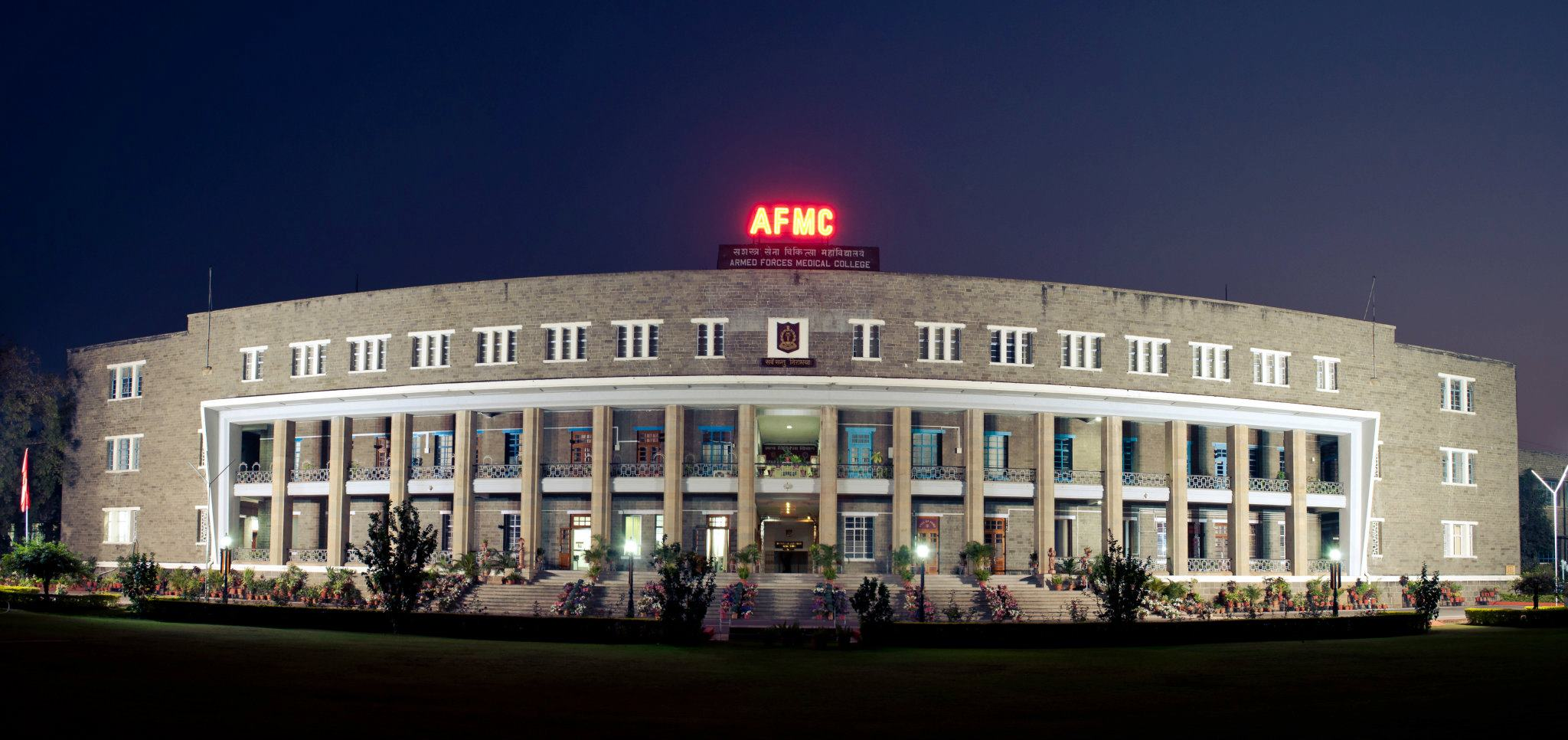
AFMC main building

The Armed Forces Medical College (AFMC) is a medical school in Pune, India, in the state of Maharashtra. The college is managed by the Indian Armed Forces.

Established in May 1948 as a post-graduate teaching institution after World War II on the recommendation of the BC Roy Committee, remnants of various Indian Army Medical Corps units were amalgamated to create the Armed Forces Medical Services. The AFMC undergraduate wing was established on 4 August 1962, which is also celebrated annually as AFMC Day by its alumni.

The institution primarily provides training to medical undergraduates and postgraduates, dental postgraduates, nursing cadets and paramedical staff. Patient care forms an integral part of its training curriculum and the attached hospitals benefits from the expertise available at AFMC. The institution is responsible for providing the entire pool of specialists and super specialists to the Armed Forces. The college is also involved in conducting research in various medical subjects as well as those aspects which would affect the morale and performance of the Armed Forces both in war and peace.

== History ==
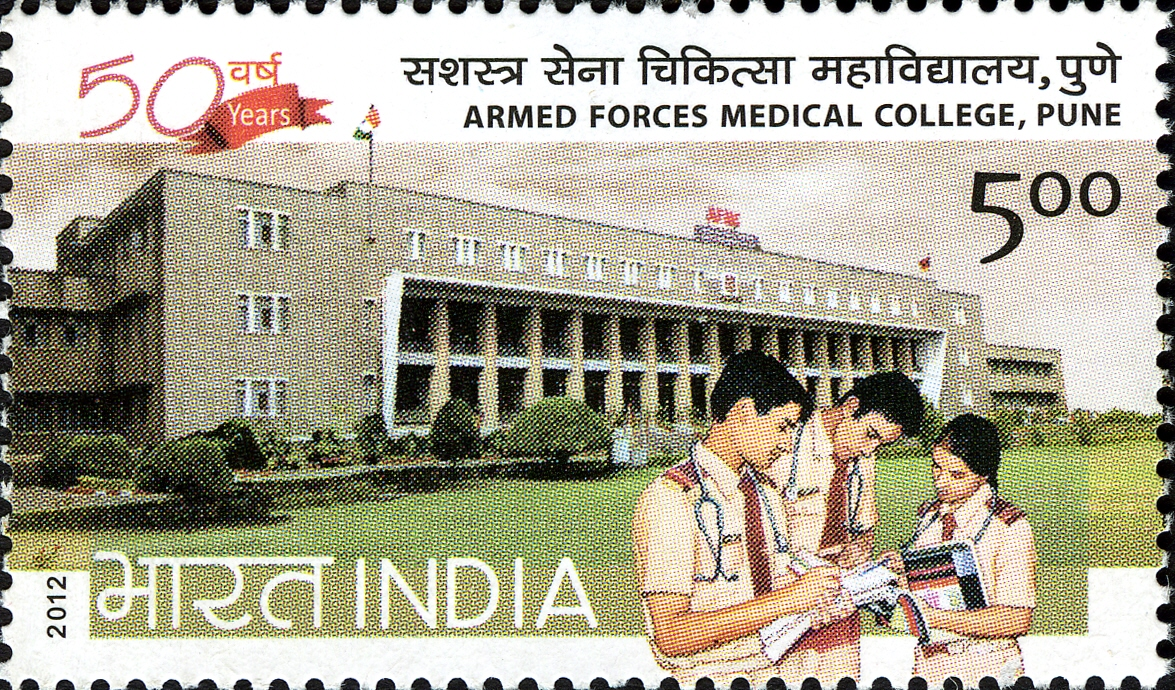
AFMC on a 2012 stamp of India

The facility was originally set up in 1944 by Lt. Colonel Darshan Singh Vohra to provide artificial limb, appliances and deliver rehabilitative care to the gallant soldiers of the Indian Army, who lost their limbs in combat. Post independence, the AFMC was expanded further in 1948 in the immediate post-world war period. On the recommendations of the BC Roy Committee, remnants of the Indian Army Medical Corps units were amalgamated into one unit to create the Armed Forces Medical College. Over the past 50 years, it has grown in its functions. The "Graduate Wing" of AFMC was established on 4 August 1962. The aim of starting this wing was to increase the intake of medical graduates into the Armed Forces. The graduate wing was affiliated to the University of Pune until 1999 but presently affiliated to the Maharashtra University of Health Sciences. The college is recognised by the Medical Council of India for conducting a five-year and six-month teaching programme leading to MBBS degree. The first batch passed out in October 1966, under one of its founding members, Commandant Maj Gen Noshir Karani. General Karani was Commandant till 1969. It also conducts post graduate courses in many disciplines.

One of the first plastic surgery departments in India was established at the college in the early 1950s.

On 1 May 2023, in a press conference director general Lt Gen Daljit Singh, told that AFMC will get the status of Institute of national importance in the coming years.

On 1 December 2023, during its platinum jubilee year, President Droupadi Murmu, granted the President's Colour, also known as 'Rashtrapati Ki Nishaan', to Armed Forces Medical College (AFMC). It is the highest honour conferred upon any military unit.

== Admission ==
A total of 150 students are admitted for undergraduate MBBS course every year; 115 boys, 30 girls and 5 foreign nationals. Admission is on the basis of the score in NEET UG (formerly through the AIPMT), followed by ToELR (Test of English comprehension, Logic and Reasoning), psychological assessment, personal interview and medical examination. Ten seats are reserved for SC/ST candidates. Preference is given to candidates that are wards of serving and retired personnel (i.e., wards of Commissioned officers, Junior Commissioned officers and Other Ranks) of the Indian Armed Forces. Students are not allowed to be married or to marry during the course, and are liable to serve as Medical officers in the Armed Forces Medical Services (AFMS), on successful completion of MBBS. Permanent commission officers after serving for a minimum 4 years as Captain/ Surgeon Lieutenant/ Flight Lieutenant can opt for post graduation (i.e. M.S. or M.D.) and even super-specialisation (i.e. M.Ch) at various Command hospitals. Short service commission (SSC) officers can opt for post graduation or specialisation after 7 years of their service. For admission in post graduation courses and super specialisation courses, marks obtained in NEET PG and NEET SS are taken into account, respectively.

=== Seat Distribution ===
AFMC Seat Distribution for MBBS course
Category	No of Seats
Total seats	150
Male	115
Female	30
International students	5
Scheduled Castes (SC)	7
Scheduled Tribes (ST)	3
Other Backward Class (OBC)	27
Unreserved (UR)	78

=== Cut-offs ===
- NEET (UG)

Year	Cut-off (Boys)	Cut-off (Girls)
2026	574	594
2025	535	555
2024	656	675
2023	622	648
2022	616	641
2021	615	627
2020	618	637
2019	596	610

== Residence halls ==
The college is fully residential with separate hostels for boys and girls. Residence in the hostels is mandatory for all the cadets for the entire duration of the course. The Boys Hostel is housed in a building which was built in 1965 and comprises 6 blocks of three floors each. There are a total of 277 rooms of approximately 8 square metres (86 sq ft) area (single-seaters) and 162 rooms of approximately 18.5 m^{2} (199 sq ft) area (double seaters). All the rooms are fully furnished. The girls' hostel was constructed in 1984 and can accommodate 130 cadets in 70 single-seater and 30 double seater rooms. The new Boys Hostel has four blocks with four floors each having 18 spacious rooms with balconies. The officers' floors for officers pursuing their post graduation courses have been incorporated into the boys hostel. Subsidised messing is provided to all medical cadets. The Central Cadets Mess was opened in 2009 for all cadets to dine together.

== Infrastructure ==
There are facilities for sports, including tennis, squash, basketball, and a swimming pool. Canteen facilities for defence personnel are also extended to the medical cadets. It has two auditoria named Dhanvantri and Bharadwaj where high-profile medical conferences are held. AFMC also works as a hospital for civilians and is collaborated with the command hospital (SC).

== Departments ==
The departments at AFMC are as follows:

- Anaesthesiology & Critical care
- Anatomy
- Biochemistry
- College of Nursing
- Community Medicine
- Dental Surgery
- Dermatology
- Forensic Medicine
- Geriatrics
- Hospital Administration
- Internal Medicine
- Microbiology
- Obstetrics & Gynaecology
- Ophthalmology
- Orthopaedics
- Otorhinolaryngology
- Pathology
- Paediatrics
- Pharmacology
- Pharmacy
- Physiology
- Psychiatry
- Radiodiagnosis
- Respiratory Medicine
- Surgery
- Sports Medicine
- Transfusion Medicine

== Rankings ==
College rankings

Medical – India
- NIRF (2024): 30
- India Today (2022): 3
- Government colleges
- Outlook India (2022): 11

AFMC was ranked 11th among government medical colleges in India in 2022 by Outlook India and 3rd among medical colleges in India in 2022, and ranked 4th in 2025 by India Today.

The college was ranked 30th among medical colleges in India by the National Institutional Ranking Framework in 2024. In the following year, the college did not participate in NIRF 2025 rankings.

== Non-academics ==
AFMC provides broad-based non-academic exposure too. Students are encouraged to participate in sports and many have excelled in this arena. There are a large number of societies and clubs like the Student Scientific Society, Computer Club, Hobbies Club, Debating Club, Adventure Club, Dance Club and Musimatics. where students can pursue extra-curricular interests. They are encouraged to participate in competitions and conferences all over the country for development of all round personality and officer like qualities. They have also won many laurels in debates, quiz contests and youth festivals in Pune and outside. Over 6000 doctors have graduated from AFMC until now. Recently the entire hostel has been given WiFi connectivity.

== Research ==
Various departments take up research projects either under departmental sponsorship or under the auspices of Armed Forces Medical Research Committee (AFMRC). Apart from service-oriented projects, research in clinical and laboratory subjects is also carried out. AFMC has the facility for animal house, hatcheries for disease producing insects. AFMC is a research and referral centre for confirmation of disease, identification of pathogens (viral and bacterial) and classification of blood disorders.

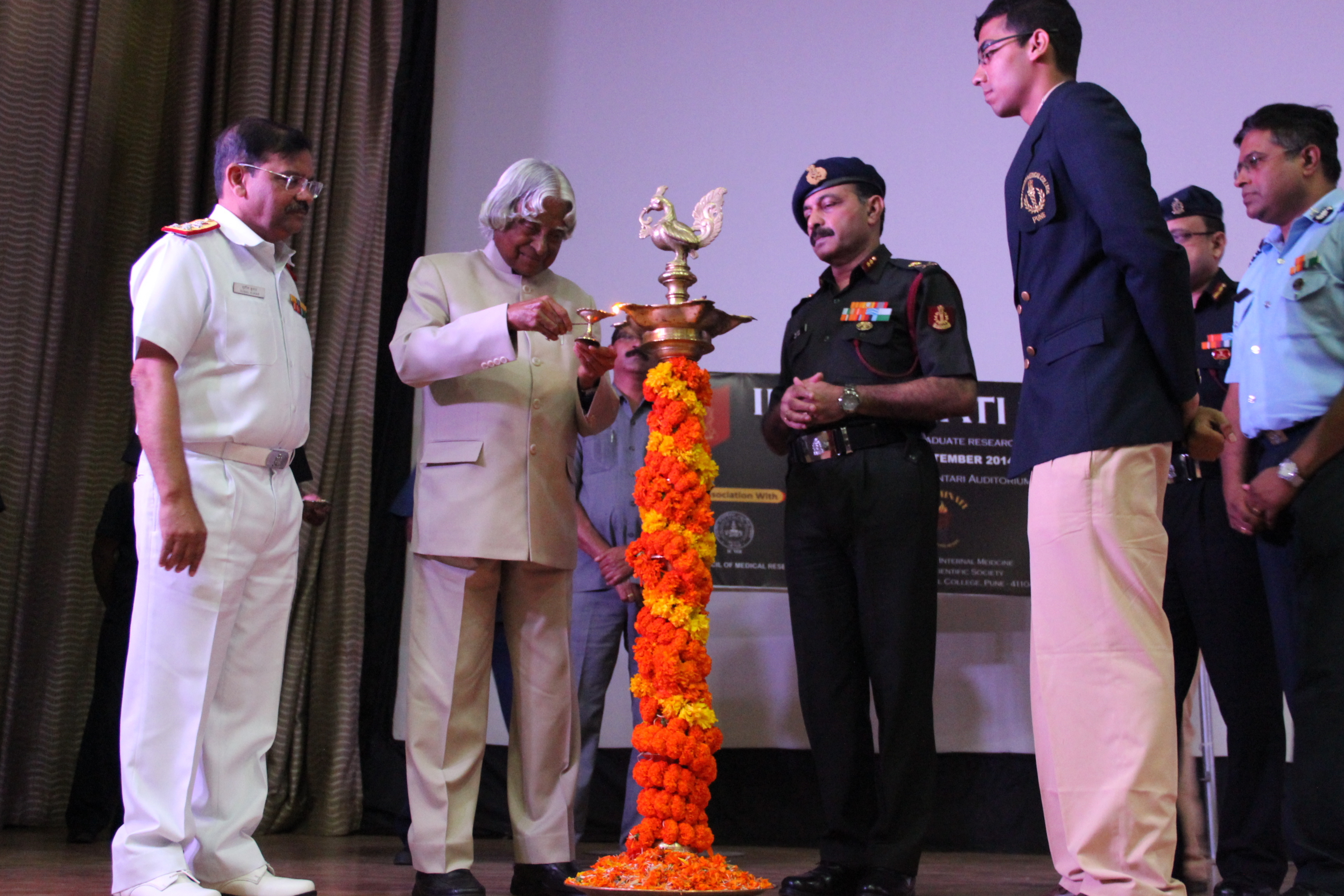
Dr. A.P.J. Abdul Kalam, Former President of India lighting the lamp at Illuminati 2014.

== Affiliations ==
Affiliated hospitals include Command Hospital (Southern Command), Military Hospital (Cardio Thoracic Centre), Artificial Limb Centre and Military Hospital (Khadki). The college is affiliated to Maharashtra University of Health Sciences.

== Notable alumni ==
- Punita Arora, first woman to reach the rank of lieutenant general in the Indian Army.
- Kamala Balakrishnan, immunologist, expert on histocompatibility and transplantation.
- Padmavathy Bandopadhyay, first woman air marshal of the Indian Air Force.
- Madhuri Kanitkar, third woman to be promoted to three-star rank and former vice-chancellor of Maharashtra University of Health Sciences.
- Sheila S. Mathai, promoted to three-star rank in the Indian Navy and commanded INHS Asvini in addition to being an acclaimed paediatrician.
- Arti Sarin, first woman to lead the Armed Forces Medical Services, and the highest-ranking woman officer in the history of Indian Armed Forces.
- Surendra Poonia, medal-winner at four consecutive world championships in powerlifting.
- Soumya Swaminathan, paediatrician, Chief Scientist at World Health Organization (WHO), and WHO's former Deputy Director-General of Programmes (DDP).
- Akhilesh Pandey, notable proteomicist.
- Anshuman Singh, RMO, Kirti Chakra recipient (posthumously).
- Devashish Sharma, RMO, Kirti Chakra recipient (posthumously).

== See also ==
- Indian National Defence University
- Military Academies in India
- Sainik school
