= Armed Forces Medical Services =

Inter-service defence organisation in India

- सशस्त्र बल चिकित्सा सेवा
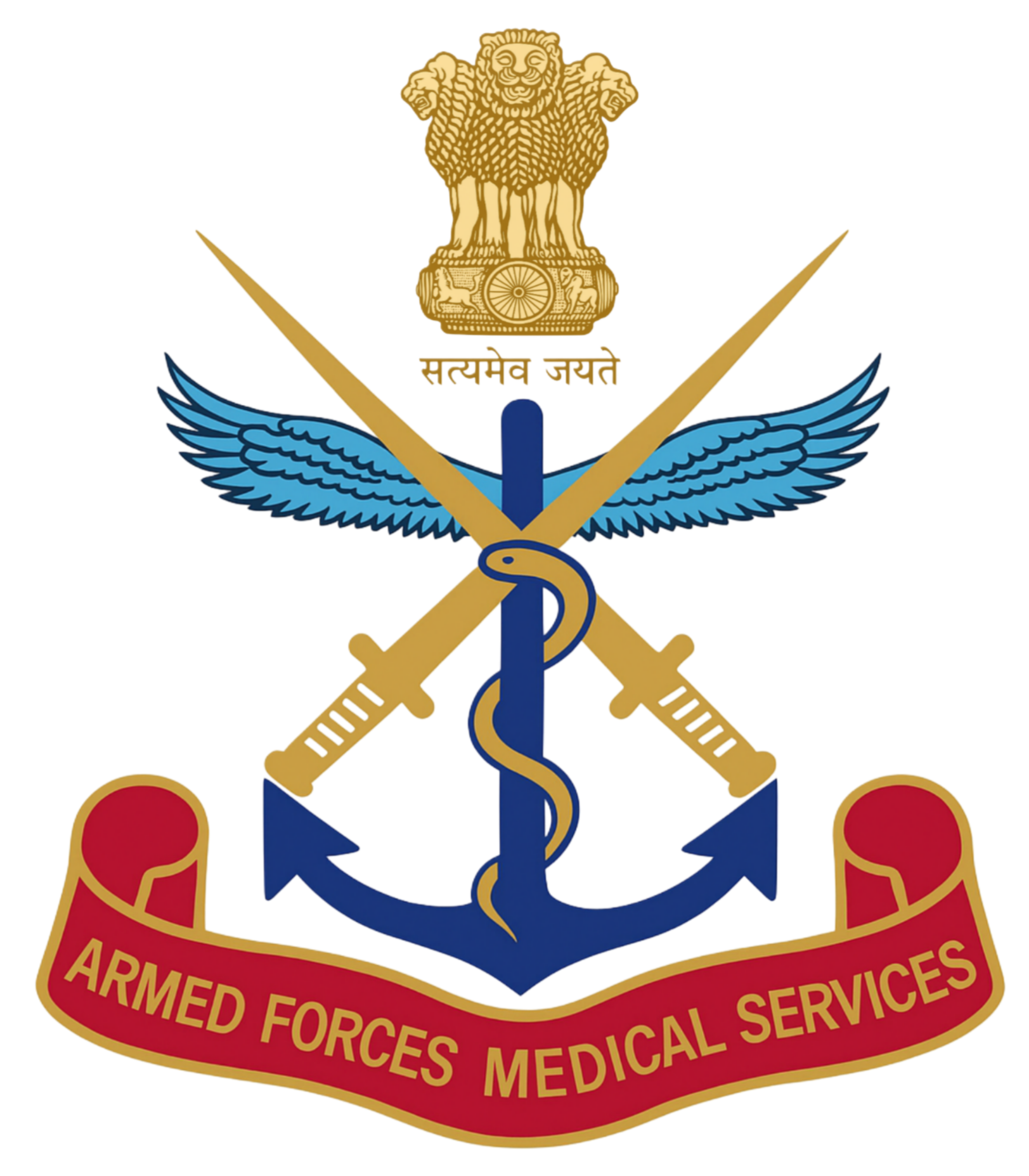
- Crest of Armed Forces Medical Services
- Active: 26 January 1947 - present
- Country: India
- Branch: Indian Armed Forces
- Type: Military Medical Corps
- Role: Combat support, medical service
- Size: 70,000 approx: 6,647 Medical/Dental officers; 3,866 Nursing Officers; ~60,000 JCO/NCO(s)
- Headquarters: Defence Officers Complex, Africa Avenue, New Delhi
- Colors: Maroon

Commanders
- Director General Armed Forces Medical Services: Air Marshal Sandeep Thareja
- Notable commanders: Lt Gen D. R. Thapar; Lt Gen B. N. Shahi

The Armed Force Medical Services (AFMS) is an inter-services organisation under the Ministry of Defence, covering the Indian Armed Forces. It came into existence in 1948. The Director General Armed Forces Medical Services, a three-star officer, is the head of the Armed Forces Medical Services and is responsible to the Government for the overall medical policy in so far as they relate to the Armed Forces.

Air Marshal Sandeep Thareja is the current Director General Armed Forces Medical Services, who assumed the office on 1 September 2026.

== History ==
In March 1947, the Armed Forces Medical Services and Research Integration Committee headed by Dr Bidhan Chandra Roy was appointed by the Government of India to consider the integration of the three armed forces medical services. The committee recommended that there should be three branches of the Indian Armed Forces Medical Services i.e. Army, Navy and Air Force and that there should be a Supreme Controller of all the three medical services designated as Director General of the Armed Forces Medical Services (DGAFMS) who would be the advisor to the Supreme Commander or the Defence Minister as the case may be, regarding the medical needs of the Armed Forces. They would be the administrative head of the Armed Forces Medical Services.

Accordingly, the Government in 1948 integrated the medical services of the Royal Indian Navy, the Indian Army and the Royal Indian Air Force into the Armed Forces Medical Service and placed the services under the Director General Armed Forces Medical Services with the rank of Lieutenant General / Vice Admiral / Air Marshal. The Government also laid down the role and character of responsibilities of DGAFMS. The DGAFMS was made directly responsible to the Ministry of Defence for overall medical policy matters in so far as they relate to the Armed Forces. The Government further laid down that the heads of medical services of Army, Navy and Air Force will be responsible for functioning of these services under the respective Service Chiefs in accordance with any general policy directions that may be given by the DGAFMS. The charter has since been amended and updated from time to time.

== Organisation ==
The Director General Armed Forces Medical Services heads the entire AFMS. The Director Generals of Medical Services of Army, Navy and Air Force are responsible for overseeing the functioning of the hospitals of the respective Services and also are the medical advisors to their respective Chief of Staff.

The AFMS consists of Army Medical Corps (AMC) including AMC (NT), Army Dental Corps (AD Corps) and Military Nursing Service (MNS).

=== Leadership ===
Appointment	Appointee	Photo	Reference
Director General Medical Services (Army)	Lieutenant General C G Muralidharan		
Director General Medical Services (Air)	Air Marshal Vivek Hande		
Director General Medical Services (Navy)	Surgeon Vice Admiral Shankar Subramanian		
Director General of Organisation & Personnel (Armed Forces)	Air Marshal Kaushik Chatterjee		
Director General of Health Services (Armed Forces)	Surgeon Vice Admiral Dilip Raghavan		
Director General Dental Services	Lieutenant General Balakrishnan Jayan		
Additional Director General, Military Nursing Service	Major General Rachel Thomas		

=== Classification of hospitals ===
Hospitals in the Army are classified into the following categories – Sectional, Peripheral, Mid Zonal, Zonal, Command, and Army Hospital (Research & Referral) – based on their bed strength and extent of the availability of specialties.

=== Training institutions ===
The Armed Forces Medical College, Pune (AFMC) is the premier training institution of the AFMS established in May 1948. Other select hospitals such as Army Hospital (R&R), CH (AF) Bengaluru and INHS Asvini, Mumbai also impart post graduate training to the AMC officers. The College of Nursing at AFMC conducts a four-year degree course in Nursing.

== See also ==
- Army Medical Corps (India)
- Military Nursing Service
- Military Engineer Services (India)
