= Laishram =

Laishram is a Meitei family name. Notable people with the surname include:

- Laishram Monika Devi (born 1983), Indian weightlifter from Manipur
- Laishram Sarita Devi (born 1982), Indian boxer from Manipur
- Laishram Bedashwor Singh (born 1998), Indian professional footballer
- Laishram Jyotin Singh, AC, Officer in the Army Medical Corps of the Indian Army
- Laishram Nabakishore Singh, Indian teacher, herbalist and physician of traditional medicine
- Laishram Nandakumar Singh, veteran politician from Manipur, India
- Laishram Premjit Singh (born 2002), Indian professional footballer
- Bombayla Devi Laishram (born 1985), Indian archer
- Devendro Laishram (born 1992), also known as Devendro Singh, Indian boxer
- Lin Laishram, Indian model, actress and businesswoman from Manipur
- Priyakanta Laishram (born 1998), Indian actor, film director, film producer, screenwriter, film editor
- Soma Laishram (born 1992), Indian film actress and singer who appears in Manipuri films

== See also ==
- Laish (disambiguation)
