= Army Medical Corps (India) =

Specialist corps of the Indian Army

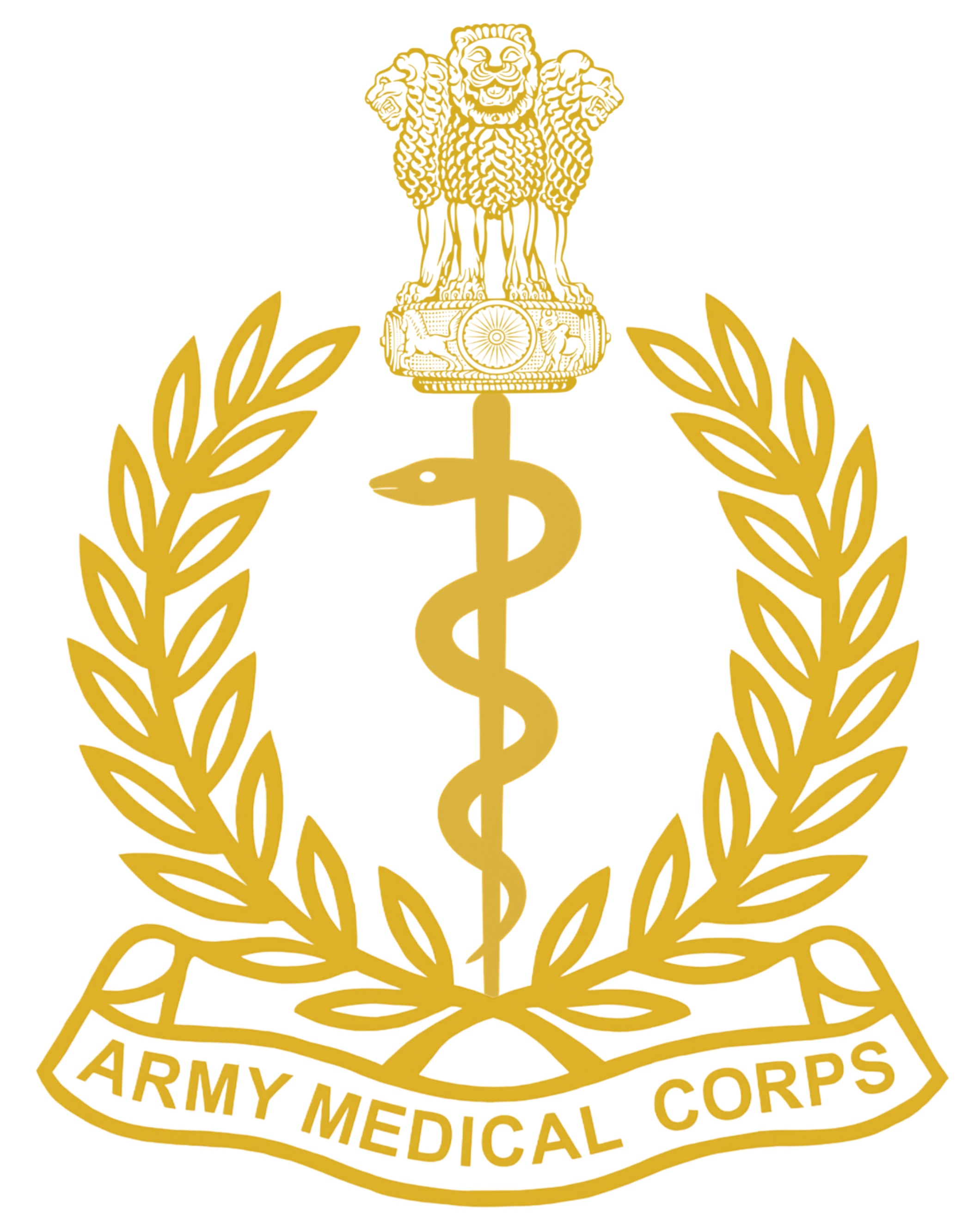
- Crest of the Army Medical Corps
- Active: 3 April 1764 - present
- Country: India
- Branch: Indian Army
- Role: Medical Service
- Regimental Centre: Lucknow, India
- Nickname: AMC
- Mottos: Sanskrit: Sarve Santu Niramaya; English: Let all be free from disease and disability
- Anniversaries: 3 April (Raising Day)

Commanders
- Director General Medical Services: Lieutenant General C G Muralidharan

Insignia
- Flag

The Army Medical Corps is a specialist corps in the Indian Army, which primarily provides medical services to all Army personnel, serving and veterans, along with their families. Along with the branches in the Indian Navy and Indian Air Force, it forms part of the Armed Forces Medical Services (AFMS). The AFMS consists of more than 70,000 personnel.

The Indian AMC is not to be confused with the Pakistani AMC. Nevertheless, both have common roots tracing back to British raj, as they were preceded by the former British Indian Army's Medical Corps until 1947.

== History ==
=== Early history ===
Very little is known of the medical organisations that existed in the Indian armies in ancient times. However, Kautilya's Arthashastra shows that during battles, physicians with surgical instruments (Shastra, medicines and drugs in their hands besides women with prepared food and beverages) stood behind the fighting men. Similarly, from the Sushrüt Samhitā, it is seen that a physician fully equipped with medicines would live in a camp not far from the royal pavilion and would treat those wounded by arrows or swords.

Physicians in the King's service adopted certain measures to protect the ruler from secret poisoning. Physicians well versed in the technical sciences and other allied branches of study was held in high esteem by all.

=== Later British Period ===
The Army Medical Corps came into existence as a homogeneous corps of officers and men on the pattern of the Royal Army Medical Corps on 3 Apr 1943 by the amalgamation of the Indian Medical Service, the Indian Medical Department and the Indian Hospital corps. The Corps was formed as a wartime necessity for attracting suitably qualified men for service in a rapidly expanding army.

=== Indian Medical Service ===
The history of the Indian Medical Service (IMS) dates back to 1612 when, on the formation of the East India Company, the Company appointed John Woodall as their first Surgeon General. Under him, medical Corps officers (mainly civilians) were recruited more or less on individual contracts. The company expanded activities in various part of the country which necessitated the formation and maintenance of regular bodies of troops in India. As a consequence, they commenced employing military surgeons from 1745 onwards. It was not until 1764 that these surgeons were made into regular establishment of the company's armies. Thus the Bengal Medical Service was formed in 1764, the Madras Medical Service in 1767 and the Bombay Medical Service in 1779 for the three Presidency Armies of Bengal, Madras and Bombay. The three medical services were combined into the Indian Medical Services (IMS) in April 1886 under a Surgeon General to the Government of India. The designation was later changed into the Director General, Indian Medical Service. In 1913, the appointment was designated as the Director of Medical Services in India.

Until the First World War the IMS was predominantly civil in character, but gradually from 1912 onwards those employed in civil duties became less and less in number. Indianisation of this service commenced from 1915 onwards. Soorjo Coomar Goodeve Chuckerbutty was the first Indian to enter the service as Assistant Surgeon on 24 January 1855.

Until Burma was separated in 1935, the IMS was catering for the civil and military needs of Burma also. During this period, the IMS was assisted by the members of the Indian Medical Department (IMD) and Indian Hospital Corps (IHC).

The idea of re-organising the medical services into a separate Medical Corps exclusively for the Defence Services was first conceived in 1939 with the out break of World War II and with the formation of Indian Army Medical Corps on 3 April 1943, the extinction of the IMS as such was merely a matter of time. On 14 August 1947 the service was finally wound up.

=== Indian Medical Department ===
The history of the Indian Medical Department (IMD) dates back to 19th century. Initially starting as compounders and dressers in the three Presidency Medical Services they became Sub Surgeons and later on as Indian Medical Assistants in Indian Regiments. In 1868, they were redesignated as Hospital Assistants. In 1900, the Senior Hospital Assistants were granted the rank of Viceroy's Commissioned Officers and in 1910 the designation was finally changed to Sub Assistant Surgeons of IMD. Army Medical Corps (AMC) were primarily for work with the Indian troops.

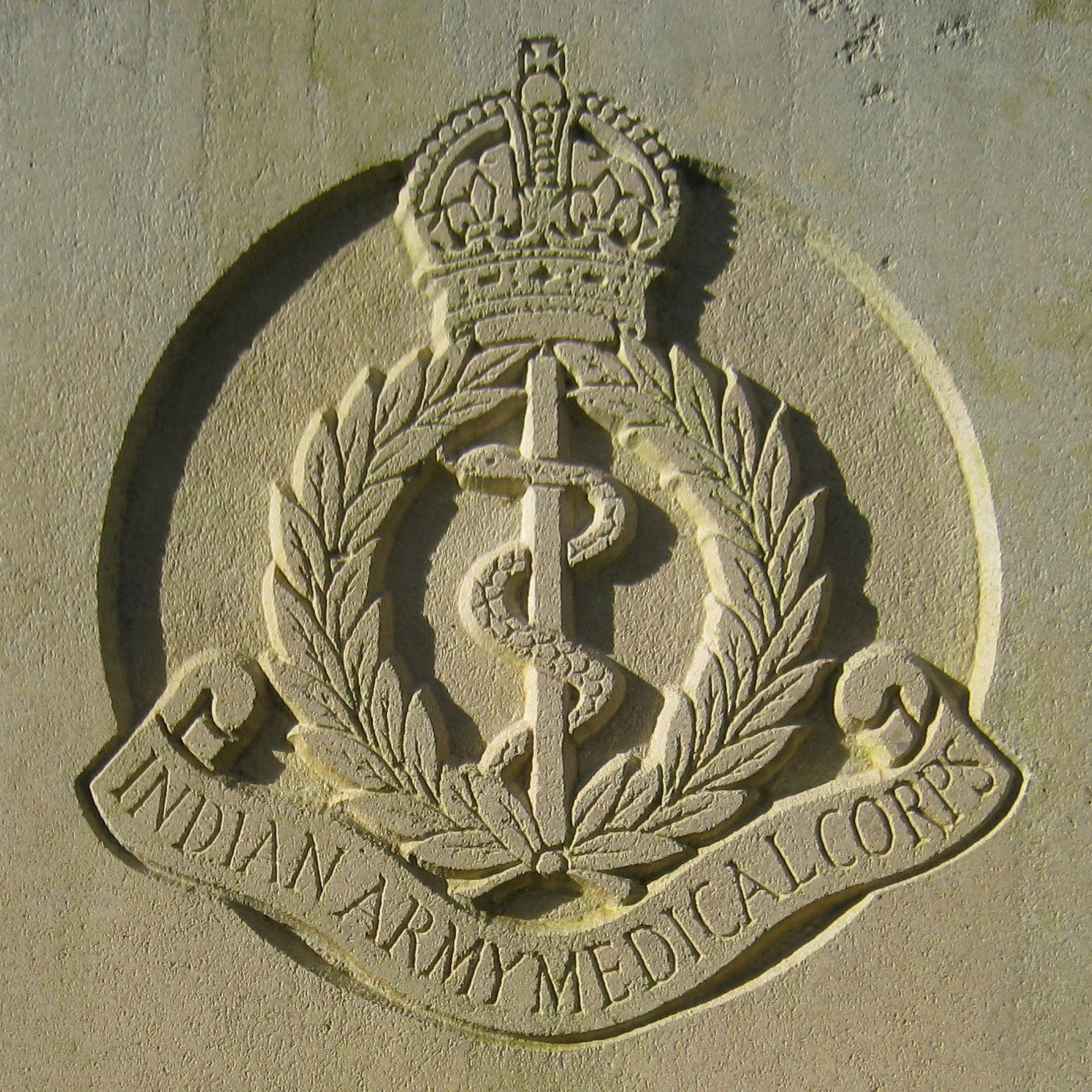
The inisignia of Indian Army Medical Corps, at the War Cemetery, Taiping, Perak

=== Army Hospital Corps ===
In the days of the East India Company there were no regular formations or units charged with the task of looking after the health of troops. In 1881 the British Regimental Hospitals gave way to British Station Hospitals and they needed subordinate persons. So in 1881, the Army Hospital Native Corps was formed of menials of the disbanded British Regimental Hospitals, Compounders, dressers, ward coolies, barbers, shop coolies, cooks, bhistis and sweepers and were designated as, Hospital Attendants. With the abolition of the Presidency Armies by the Government and the evolution of the Army into 10 Divisions, the Army Hospital Native Corps was re-organised into 10 Companies as Army Hospital Corps.

=== Army Bearer Corps ===
It was not until 1901 that the necessity for a proper corps of bearers was accepted by the Government and in this year, Dooly Bearers and Kahars were enlisted in the newly formed Army Bearer Corps, which came under the Medical Department. The Army Hospital Corps persons did the menial service in British Station Hospitals and the Army Bearer Corps provided persons for the carriage of the sick and wounded. In 1903, the Army Bearer Corps was re-organised into 10 Division Companies and the duties of these Companies in war were to carry stretchers and doolies, and in peace for general work in hospital.

=== Indian Hospital Corps ===
The Indian Hospital Corps was formed on 1 June 1920 by combining the Army Hospital Corps and Army Bearer Corps and the subordinate personnel of Indian Station Hospitals, comprising persons of categories then considered necessary for hospitals, field ambulances and other medical units.

=== Station Hospitals ===
Indian troops had no station hospital facilities until 1918, and had to depend entirely on their regimental hospitals. In October 1918, Station Hospitals for Indian troops were sanctioned. Ward orderlies and followers came from Army Hospital Corps and bearers were provided by the Army Bearer Corps.

The IHC initially was divided into 10 Division Companies corresponding to the 10 existing Military Divisions in India and Burma and they were located at Peshwar, Rawalpindi, Lahore, Quetta, Mhow, Pune, Meerut, Lucknow, Secunderabad and Rangoon. The whole corps was re-organised on command basis during the year 1929-32 and thus there were five companies of the IHC in 1932, No 1 Company at Rawalpindi, No 2 Company at Lucknow, No 3 Company at Poona. No 4 Company at Quetta and No 5 Company at Rangoon. On separation of Burma in 1935, No 5 Company of IHC was formed as Burma Hospital Corps and this left four companies of IHC.

=== Indian Army Medical Corps ===
World War II was responsible for rapid developments. The idea of having a homogeneous corps by amalgamating IMS, IMD gradually took shape and Indian Army Medical Corps (IAMC) came into being on 3 April 1943. The organisation was to be in the lines of the Royal Army Medical Corps. On the formation of the IAMC, the IHC HQs at Poona became the Administrative Headquarters of the IAMC in May 1943.

=== Army Medical Corps ===
After independence of the country, the Corps has made a steady progress. The men enjoy combatant status. The IAMC was re-designated as Army Medical Corps with effect from 26 January 1950.

The post of Director General Armed Forces Medical Services was created in 1949, who functions under the Ministry of Defence. Under the DGAFMS are individual medical service heads. The DFAFMS thus coordinates with the heads of the medical services of the Army, Navy and Air Force. The Army Dental Corps (ADC) and the Military Nursing Service have their own department heads (Director General Dental Services and Additional Director General Military Nursing Service) functioning under the DGAFMS.

The AFMS provides its services through a network Medical Inspection (MI) rooms located in the Units, Station Health Organisations and Family Welfare Centres; 133 Military Hospitals located at static military stations (which has varying bed strengths) and 99 Field Hospitals that provide medical care to service personnel in the field areas. Each Command has a Command Hospital and there are specialised hospitals like the Army Institute of Cardio-Thoracic Sciences (AICTS) and Artificial Limb Centre, both of which are located at Pune. At the apex is the Army Hospital (Research and Referral). In addition, AMC also have 32 Station Health Organizations (SHO), 02 Army Medical Store Depots (AMSDs), 07 Forward Medical STore Depots (FMSDs) and 04 ARmed Forces Medical STore Depots (AFMSDs)

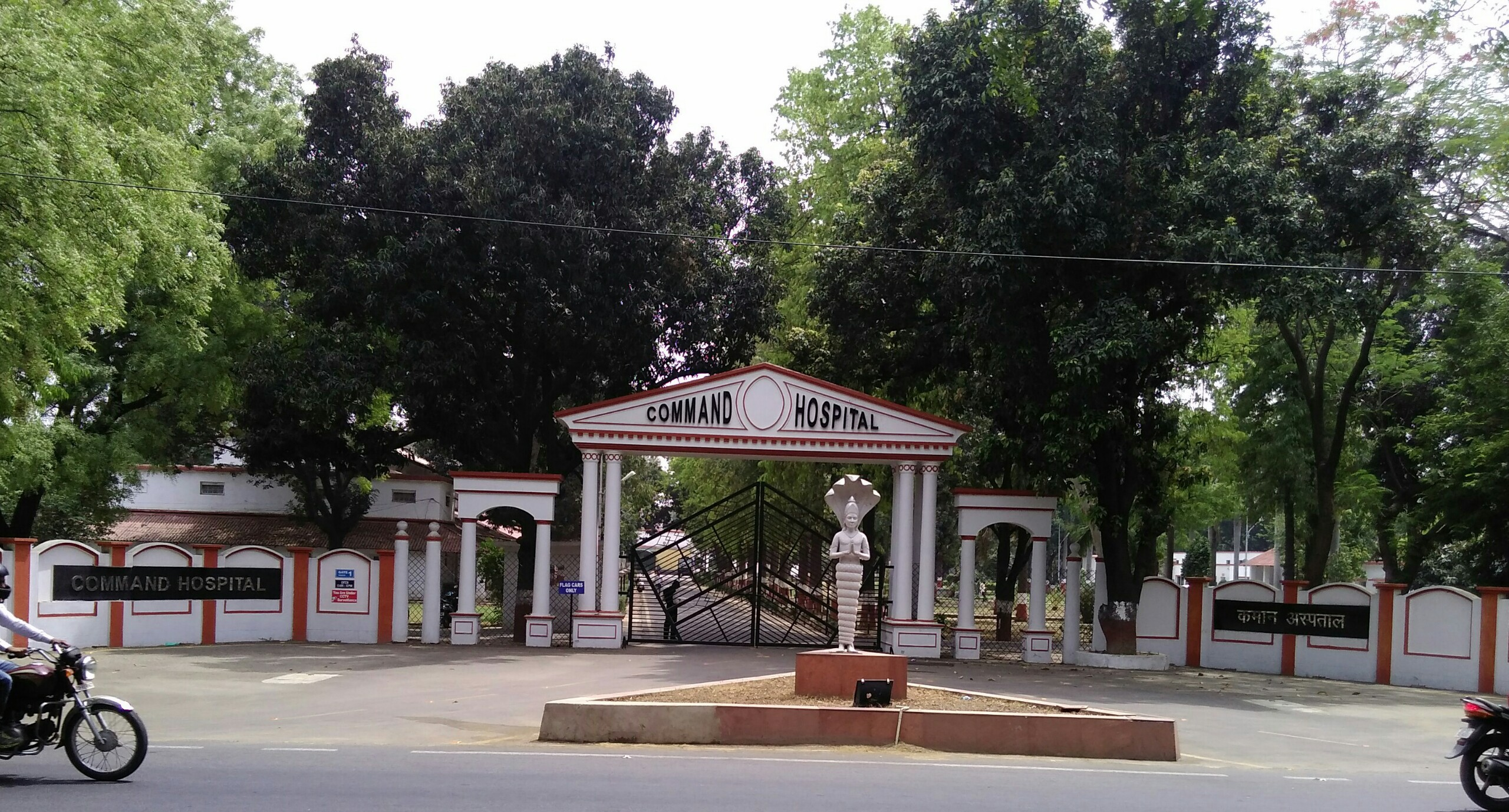
Main entry gate to Command Hospital (Central Command) of Indian Army, Lucknow.

== Training ==
The AMC Centre and College is located in Lucknow, where new recruits and officers are trained. It also houses the AMC records. Medical officers are inducted either from the Armed Forces Medical College, Pune after training or from other medical colleges, based on available vacancies. The Armed Forces Medical College, Pune (AFMC), which was established in 1948 is the premier training institution of the AFMS. It provides undergraduate, postgraduate & super-specialty training to AFMS, Central Armed Police Forces (CAPF) & Friendly Foreign Countries Medical Officers. The College of Nursing at AFMC conducts a four-year degree course in Nursing. In addition, all Command Hospitals impart post graduate MD/MS training to the AFMS officers.

== Journal ==
The Medical Journal Armed Forces India is the official journal of the AMC. It was founded as the Journal of Indian Army Medical Corps in 1945.

== Combat operations ==
The Army Medical Corps has seen combat and active operations in all operations and wars the Indian Army was involved, as part of combat formations or as hospitals apart from providing life-saving services in tertiary/referral hospitals around the country.

== Accolades & Stories ==
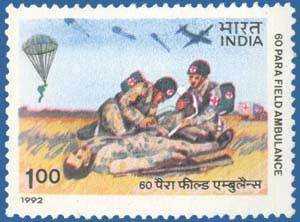
60th Parachute Field Ambulance - 50th Anniversary Stamp (1992)

- The then President of India Dr Sarvepalli Radhakrishnan presented the Presidential Colours to the corps on its raising day on 3 April 1966.
- Captain John Alexander Sinton of the Indian Medical Service was awarded the Victoria Cross during World War I in Orah Ruins, Mesopotamia while serving with a Dogra battalion (presently a mechanized infantry battalion).
- 60 Parachute Field Ambulance was the first medical unit to be raised for airborne operations and to provide medical cover to 50 Indian Parachute Brigade in 1941, and was followed by 60 and 7 Parachute Field Ambulances, when the formation was increased to divisional strength. The unit under Lieutenant Colonel Davis saw action in the Battle of Shangshak during World War II where it, along with the rest of the depleted-strength parachute brigade was virtually wiped out, but it gave XIV Army enough time to prepare Manipur and Imphal plains for defence. The unit, along with the medical officers of the two para battalions earned several gallantry awards.
- Captain S Gopalakrishnan of the Indian Army Medical Corps, attached to 3rd Battalion, 5th Gorkha Rifles, was awarded the Military Cross in November 1944. Between 22 and 26 March, while the battalion was pinned down by Japanese troops and snipers on Mile 98.4 on the Tiddim Road, Capt Gopalakrishnan worked round the clock for four days providing medical assistance and relief to the wounded. He ended up saving nearly a hundred lives according to the Citation. He later retired as a Brigadier in the Indian Army.
- Major (later Lieutenant General) Anil Krishna Barat was awarded the Maha Vir Chakra during the Indo-Pakistani War of 1947–1948. He worked with the utmost professionalism and saved the lives of troops under intense enemy fire in Naushera sector.
- The first Indian paratrooper was a medical officer, Lieutenant (later Colonel) AG Rangaraj of 152 Indian Parachute Battalion. He later commanded 60 Indian Parachute Field Ambulance in Korea (Operation Tomahawk) and was awarded Maha Vir Chakra, the second highest gallantry award. During the same operations, Major Nirode Baran Banerjea was also awarded the Maha Vir Chakra. Major V Rangaswamy, Captain NC Das and Naik Ratan Singh received the Vir Chakra.
- Captain Devashish Sharma was awarded the Kirti Chakra posthumously for his valour during counter terrorist operations in Jammu and Kashmir in 1994.
- Major Laishram Jyotin Singh awarded Ashok Chakra, the highest peacetime gallantry award on 26 January 2011. Laishram Singh was born in 1972 in Manipur, India. He was commissioned in the Army Medical Corps in 2003, and was posted with the Indian Embassy in Kabul in 2010. Just thirteen days after his posting, a suicide bomber attacked the guarded residential compound where he was staying. Major Singh confronted the terrorist unarmed and forced him to detonate his vest, which resulted in his death. He was awarded the Ashok Chakra for "his act of exemplary courage, grit, selflessness and valour in the face of a terrorist attack, resulting in his sacrifice and saving 10 of his colleagues".

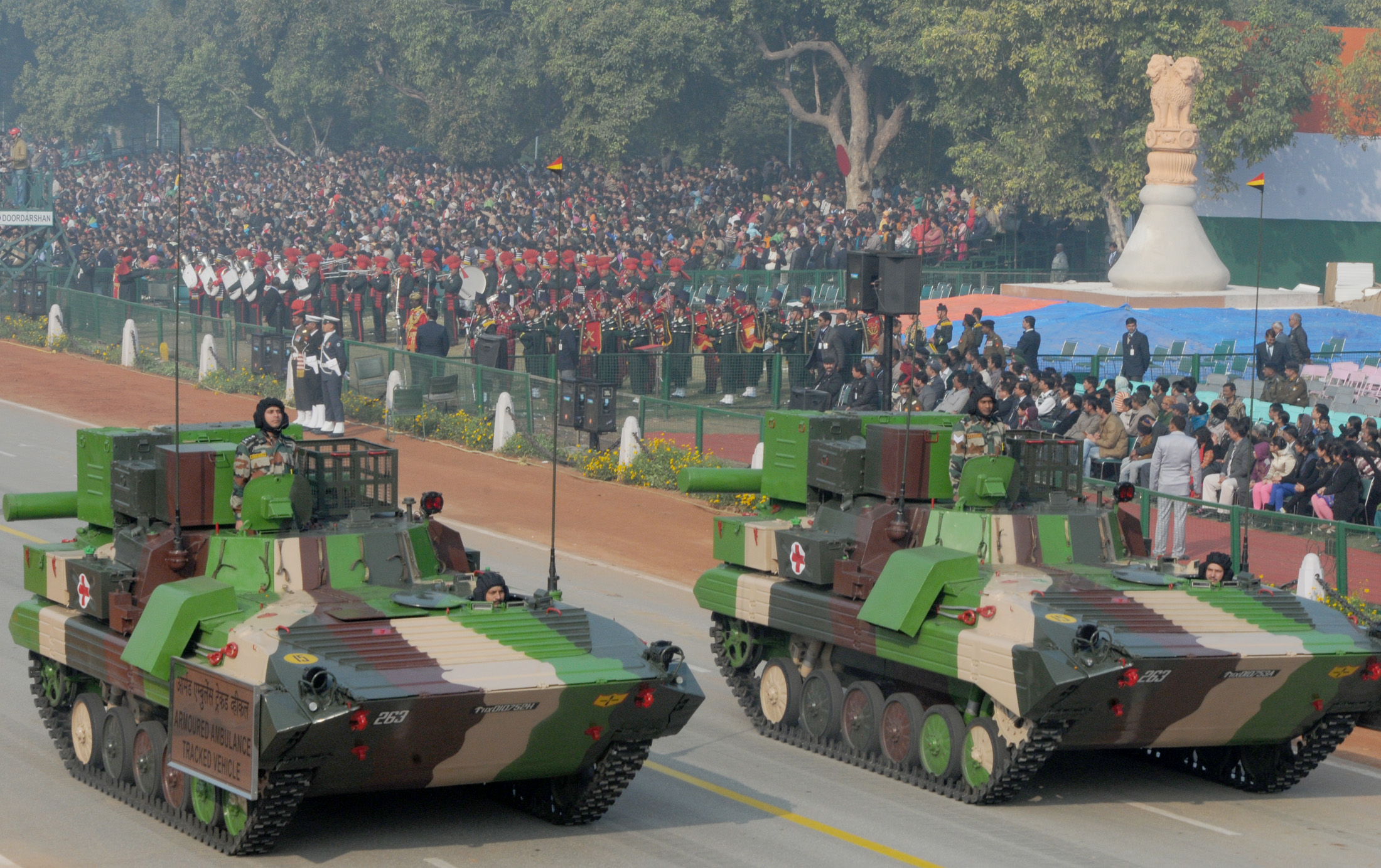
Armoured Ambulance Tracked Vehicle of 333 Field Ambulance passes through the Rajpath during the full dress rehearsal for the Republic Day Parade-2013

== Notable gallantry award winners ==
- Lt Col Arcot Govindaraj Rangaraj - Maha Vir Chakra 1951
- Maj Laishram Jyotin Singh (Posthumous) - Ashok Chakra 2010
- Capt Anshuman Singh (Posthumous)-Kirti Chakra 2024

== See also ==
- Command Hospital
- List of Armed Forces Hospitals In India
- Central Health Service (CHS)
