= Director General Armed Forces Medical Services (India) =

Medical Head of Indian Armed Forces

- महानिदेशक सशस्त्र बल चिकित्सा सेवा
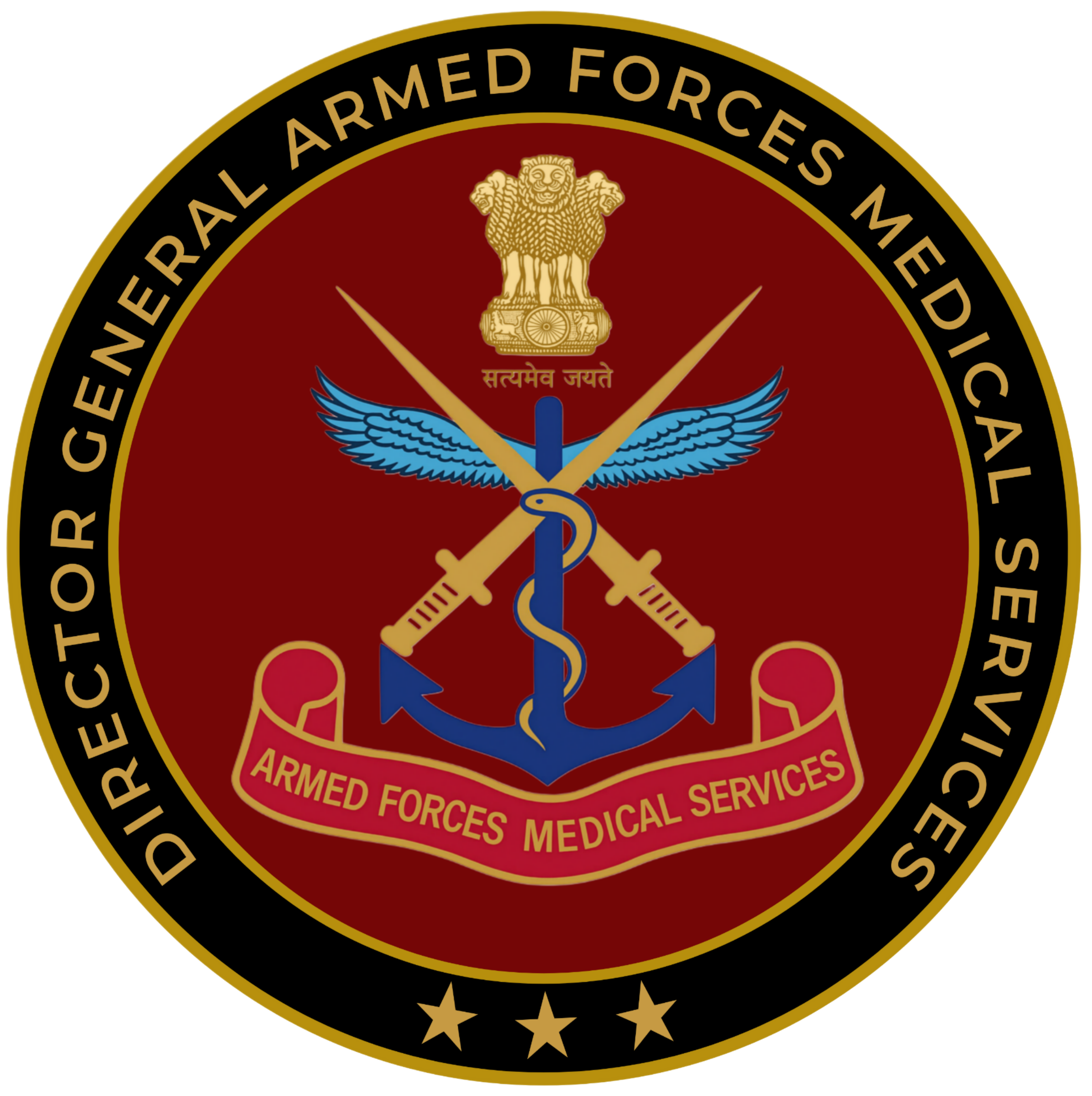
- Seal of DGAFMS

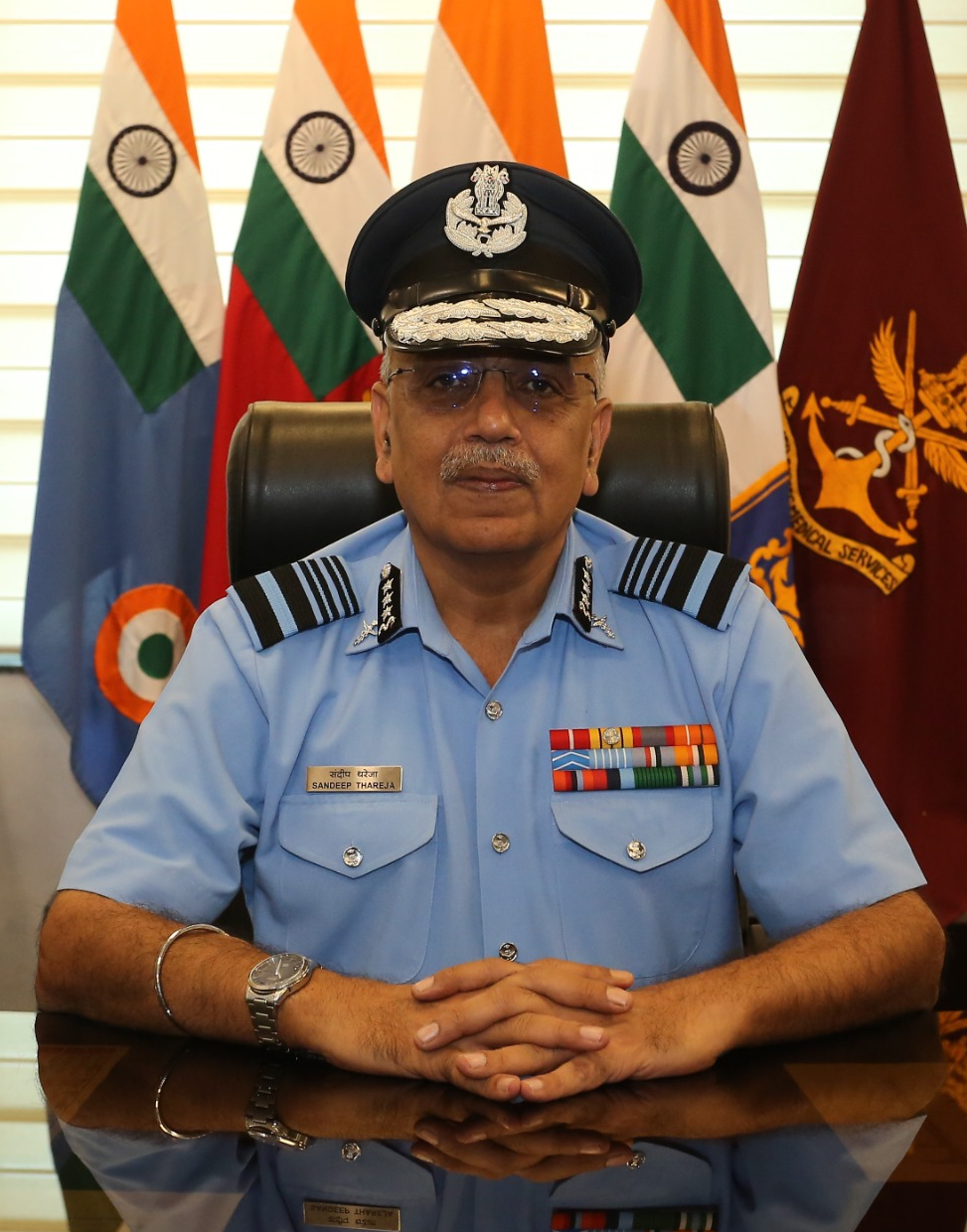
- Incumbent; Air Marshal Sandeep Thareja; SM VSM** since 1 September 2026
- Armed Forces Medical Services; Indian Air Force
- Style: Air Marshal
- Type: Apex level medical military position
- Abbreviation: DGAFMS
- Reports to: Minister of Defence; Chief of Defence Staff
- Appointer: Appointments Committee of the Cabinet (ACC)
- Formation: 1948
- First holder: Lieutenant General K. S. Master, MC
- Salary: Pay level 17

The Director General Armed Forces Medical Services (DGAFMS) is the head of the Armed Forces Medical Services of the Indian Armed Forces. The DGAFMS is the advisor to the Chief of Defence Staff (CDS) and the Defence Minister on the medical requirements of the Armed Forces.

== History ==
In March 1947, an Armed Forces Medical Services and Research Integration Committee was formed by the Government of India. The committee, headed by Dr. Bidhan Chandra Roy, subsequently Chief Minister of West Bengal until 1962, was tasked with examining the integration of medical services and research of the three branches of the Armed Forces. The committee recommended that the Indian Armed Forces Medical Services would have a supreme controller designated Director General of the Armed Forces Medical Services in the rank of lieutenant general, vice admiral, or air marshal.

In September 1948, the medical services of the Royal Indian Navy, the Indian Army and the Royal Indian Air Force were integrated into the Armed Forces Medical Service (AFMS). The AFMS consists of the Army Medical Corps (AMC), the Army Dental Corps (AD Corps) and the Military Nursing Service (MNS). The Director of Medical Services at Army Headquarters, Lieutenant General K. S. Master, was appointed the first director general Armed Forces Medical Services to head the service. The DGAFMS would be responsible to the Ministry of Defence for overall medical policy matters related to the Armed Forces.

== Appointees ==
Key

- ^{†} Died in office

S.No.	Portrait	Name	Service branch	Assumed office	Left office	Reference
1.		Lieutenant General Kaikhosru Sorabji Master MC	Indian Army	September 1948	1 October 1950	
2.		Lieutenant General Daya Ram Thapar CIE, OBE	Indian Army	1 October 1950	11 June 1954	
3.		Lieutenant General Devendra Nath Chakravarti OBE	Indian Army	12 June 1954	15 October 1955	
4.		Lieutenant General Bijeta Chaudhuri OBE	Indian Army	15 October 1955	16 October 1959	
5.		Lieutenant General Benegal Mukunda Rao	Indian Army	16 October 1959	1 September 1961	
6.		Lieutenant General Shiv Parshad Bhatia OBE	Indian Army	1 September 1961	9 October 1962	
7.		Lieutenant General Charu Chandra Kapila OBE	Indian Army	9 October 1962	10 October 1964	
8.		Lieutenant General Tirath Ram Pahwa	Indian Army	10 October 1964	25 October 1966	
9.		Lieutenant General Amarendra Krishna Dey PVSM, AVSM	Indian Army	26 October 1966	15 December 1967	
10.		Lieutenant General Jagdish Ram Vaid FRCS	Indian Army	15 December 1967	27 July 1968 ^{†}	
11.		Lieutenant General Bidyapati Bhattacharjya FRCP, FRCPE	Indian Army	31 July 1968	9 July 1969	
12.		Lieutenant General Sailendra Nath Chatterjee PVSM, MC	Indian Army	9 July 1969	1 August 1973	
13.		Lieutenant General Ved Prakash PVSM	Indian Army	2 August 1973	31 December 1974	
14.		Air Marshal Ajit Nath PVSM	Indian Air Force	1 January 1975	23 April 1976	
15.		Lieutenant General Raghunath Singh Hoon PVSM, AVSM	Indian Army	24 April 1976	1 July 1977	
16.		Lieutenant General Biradavolu Durga Prasad Rao MBE	Indian Army	1 July 1977	24 April 1978	
17.		Lieutenant General Lok Nath Budhraja PVSM, AVSM, MBE	Indian Army	24 April 1978	31 October 1979	
18.		Lieutenant General Devendra Nath Gupta PVSM, AVSM	Indian Army	1 November 1979	31 January 1982	
19.		Lieutenant General Harnam Singh Seth	Indian Army	1 February 1982	31 July 1982	
20.		Lieutenant General Vallury Venkateswara Surya Prataprao PVSM	Indian Army	1 August 1982	31 May 1983	
21.		Lieutenant General Ananta Narayanan Ramasubramaniam FRCPE	Indian Army	1 June 1983	1985	
22.		Lieutenant General Harish Chandra Puri AVSM, VSM, FRCS, FRCSE	Indian Army	October 1985	31 August 1986	
23.		Lieutenant General Jagdish Narayan PVSM	Indian Army	1 September 1986	31 December 1987	
24.		Lieutenant General Krishan Das Kapur	Indian Army	1 January 1988	September 1988	
25.		Lieutenant General Jaswant Singh Paul	Indian Army	30 September 1988	February 1990	
26.		Lieutenant General Vijay Kishore Tewari	Indian Army	16 February 1990	March 1991	
27.		Lieutenant General Nirendra Chandra Sanyal	Indian Army	16 April 1991	December 1994	
28.		Surgeon Vice Admiral Inderjit Singh	Indian Navy	18 December 1994	1 September 1996	
29.		Lieutenant General Dasarathy Raghunath AVSM	Indian Army	1 September 1996	1 September 1997	
30.		Lieutenant General Ramanand Jayaswal AVSM	Indian Army	1 September 1997	2000	
31.		Lieutenant General Ravinder Kumar Jetley PVSM, VSM	Indian Army	9 October 2000	31 October 2002	
32.		Lieutenant General Bijoy Nandan Shahi PVSM, AVSM, VSM	Indian Army	1 November 2002	1 February 2004	
33.		Lieutenant General Janak Raj Bhardwaj PVSM, AVSM, VSM	Indian Army	1 February 2004	May 2005	
34.		Surgeon Vice Admiral Vijai Kumar Singh	Indian Navy	June 2005	1 May 2007	
35.		Surgeon Vice Admiral Yogendra Singh VSM	Indian Navy	1 May 2007	30 May 2009	
36.		Lieutenant General Naresh Kumar Parmar PVSM, AVSM, VrC, VSM	Indian Army	1 June 2009	1 June 2011	
37.		Lieutenant General Hira Lal Kakria PVSM, AVSM, VSM	Indian Army	1 June 2011	30 June 2012	
38.		Air Marshal Dhananjay Parashuram Joshi PVSM, AVSM	Indian Air Force	1 July 2012	31 October 2014	
39.		Lieutenant General Bhushan Kumar Chopra AVSM	Indian Army	1 November 2014	30 June 2016	
40.		Lieutenant General Manoj Kumar Unni AVSM, VSM	Indian Army	1 July 2016	1 November 2017	
41.		Lieutenant General Bipin Puri VSM	Indian Army	1 November 2017	1 November 2019	
42.		Lieutenant General Anup Banerji SM	Indian Army	1 November 2019	31 December 2020	
43.		Surgeon Vice Admiral Rajat Datta AVSM, SM, VSM	Indian Navy	1 January 2021	14 March 2023	
44.		Lieutenant General Daljit Singh AVSM, VSM	Indian Army	15 March 2023	30 September 2024	
45.		Surgeon Vice Admiral Arti Sarin PVSM, AVSM, VSM	Indian Navy	1 October 2024	31 August 2026	
46.		Air Marshal Sandeep Thareja SM, VSM**	Indian Air Force	1 September 2026	Incumbent	

Number of DGAFMS by branches of service
Branch	Count
Indian Army	38
Indian Navy	5
Indian Air Force	3

== See also ==
- Army Medical Corps (India)
- Armed Forces Medical Services
