= Army Dental Corps (India) =

Dental Corps of the Indian Army

- Crest of Army Dental Corps
- Active: 1 February 1941–present
- Country: India
- Branch: Indian Army
- Nickname: ADCorps
- Anniversaries: 1 February (Raising Day)

Commanders
- Director General Dental Services: Lieutenant General Vineet Sharma, AVSM VSM

The Army Dental Corps (ADCorps) is a specialist corps in the Indian Army, primarily providing dental services to all Army personnel and veterans, along with their families.

== History ==
History of dentistry in India dates back to the Vedic era. Patanjali and Sushruta were Vedic era surgeons who wrote about extraction of teeth, forceps, transplantation of teeth from captured or dead enemies, and reconstruction of jaws, face and nose damaged in the acts of war or violence. Earlier Indians used to maintain dental hygiene. They used datun, especially from neem and babool twigs, to clean their teeth. Indians also used false teeth. In 1193, CE the body of Jayachandra was identified by his false teeth. Indians did not use refined sugar or crystal sugar in food and instances of dental caries were low. Refined sugar and crystal sugar were introduced by the British Raj in 19th century, and started to be used more commonly only after World War II. Consequently, tooth decay among Indians increased with the usage of these, from 20% of the population in 1950 to 50% by 1970 and 70% by the 1990s.

Western medical practice reached India in 1600 CE with the first fleet of the British East India Company, consisting of five ships, each of which had two barber surgeons. They established shore-based factories for trade and progressively gained their colonial rule over India. In 1822 CE, the first western-style medical institute for training was opened at Calcutta, which became the Medical College and Hospital, Kolkata. The first dental college was established in England in 1855. Dr. Rafiuddin Ahmed, who is considered the father of dentistry in India, established the first recognised dental institute in India in 1925 after obtaining his Doctor of Dental Surgery degree from the University of Iowa.

Dentistry was part of British colonial rule's Indian Medical Service (IMS). The first Indian who joined the IMS was Dr. S.C.G. Chukerbutty in 1855. Regular dental treatment for British troops in India began in 1905 when special pay was paid to medical officers, including dentists. Between the First and Second World Wars, many British military officers of British Raj and their families did not want to be treated by the Indian doctors of IMS. However, the shortage of doctors due to the outbreak of World War II forced the British Raj to recruit Indian doctors as not only the lower grade IMD (Indian Medical Department), but also as the higher grade of IMS, which was previously restricted to only British nationals. After 1940, when it was decided that a large number of otherwise fit candidates who got rejected due to tooth decay could be easily recruited, the Indian Army Dental Corps (IADC) expanded significantly.

== Notable Personnel & Awards ==
Lieutenant General Vimal Arora PVSM AVSM VSM & Bar served as the Director General of Dental Services and Colonel Commandant of the Army Dental Corps. During his career, he received four Presidential Awards, including the Vishisht Seva Medal (1996), Bar to Vishisht Seva Medal (2006), Ati Vishisht Seva Medal (2014), and the Param Vishishta Seva Medal. He also served as the Honorary Dental Surgeon to the President of India and received the Order of the Special Royal Emblem from the Sultan of Oman.

== Recruitment ==
Physically fit candidates can apply for the recruitment in the AD Corps after the completion of either the Bachelor of Dental Surgery or Masters Dental Surgery (MDS) degrees and applying for the job. The MDS degree can only be pursued after passing the NEET MDS Exam. Information on application can be found on a brochure made available through the Indian Army website.

== See also ==
- Army ranks and insignia of India
- Army Medical Corps (India)
- Command Hospital
- List of Armed Forces Hospitals In India
- Women in Indian Armed Forces
- Armed Forces Medical Services
