= INHS Sanjivani =

- Indian Navy
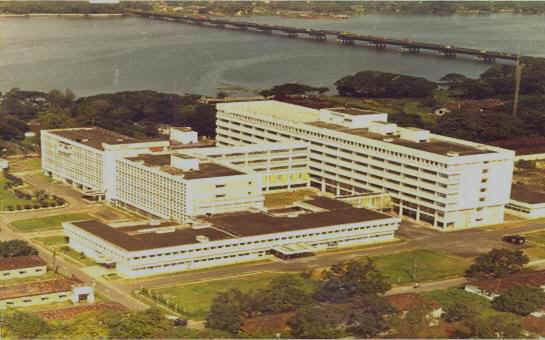
- Aerial view of the hospital complex

Geography
- Location: Willingdon Island, Kochi, Kerala

Organisation
- Type: Naval Hospital

Services
- Beds: 333

History
- Founded: 8 March 1958; 68 years ago

Links
- Website: INHS Sanjivani

INHS Sanjivani is a multi-speciality hospital of the Indian Navy at Kochi, Kerala under the Southern Naval Command. It is the largest military hospital in the states of Kerala and Tamil Nadu. It is the nodal hospital for ships and other naval units at Kochi. The hospital also provides medical cover and aid to civil authorities as required, including disaster relief operations.

== History ==
INHS Sanjivani traces its origins to the establishment of a Medical Inspection Room for HMIS Venduruthy in 1943. A dental centre started function alongside the MI room in 1952. The present hospital was commissioned as a 75-bed facility on 8 March 1958 and named after the mythological herb mentioned in the Hindu epic Ramayana. The crest of the establishment depicts Hanuman's hand carrying the mountain growing the Sanjivani herb, with a background of coconut trees and blue white sea waves representing the coast of Kerala. The bed strength has increased since the inception of the hospital and now stands at 333.

The post of the commanding office was upgraded from Surgeon Captain to Surgeon Commodore in 2008. The modular operation theatre and CT scan complex were inaugurated in 2009. A state-of-the-art MRI center was inaugurated at the hospital in May 2016. The campus also hosts a Ex-Servicemen Contributory Health Scheme (ECHS) polyclinic, the first under the Southern Naval Command.

== Achievements ==
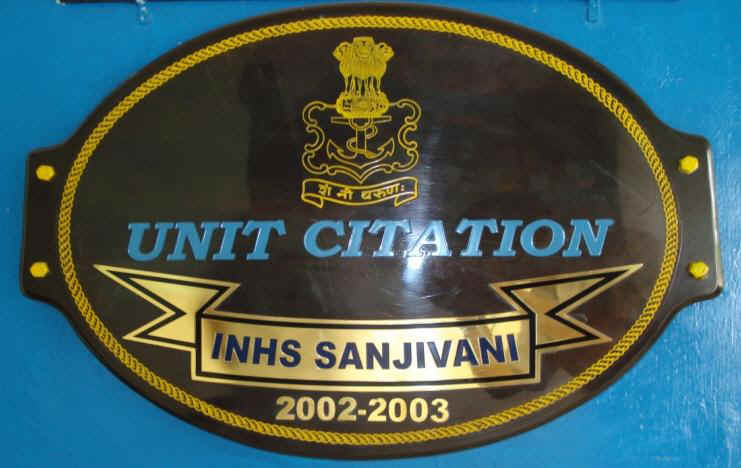
Chief of Naval Staff Unit Citation

The hospital was awarded the Unit Citation by the by Chief of Naval Staff in 2003 and the Director General Medical Services (Navy) Trophy for the best Naval Hospital in 2016.

== See also ==
- List of Armed Forces Hospitals In India
- Indian Navy
- Southern Naval Command
