= Sandeep Thareja =

47th Director General Armed Forces Medical Services (India)

Air Marshal Sandeep Thareja SM VSM**
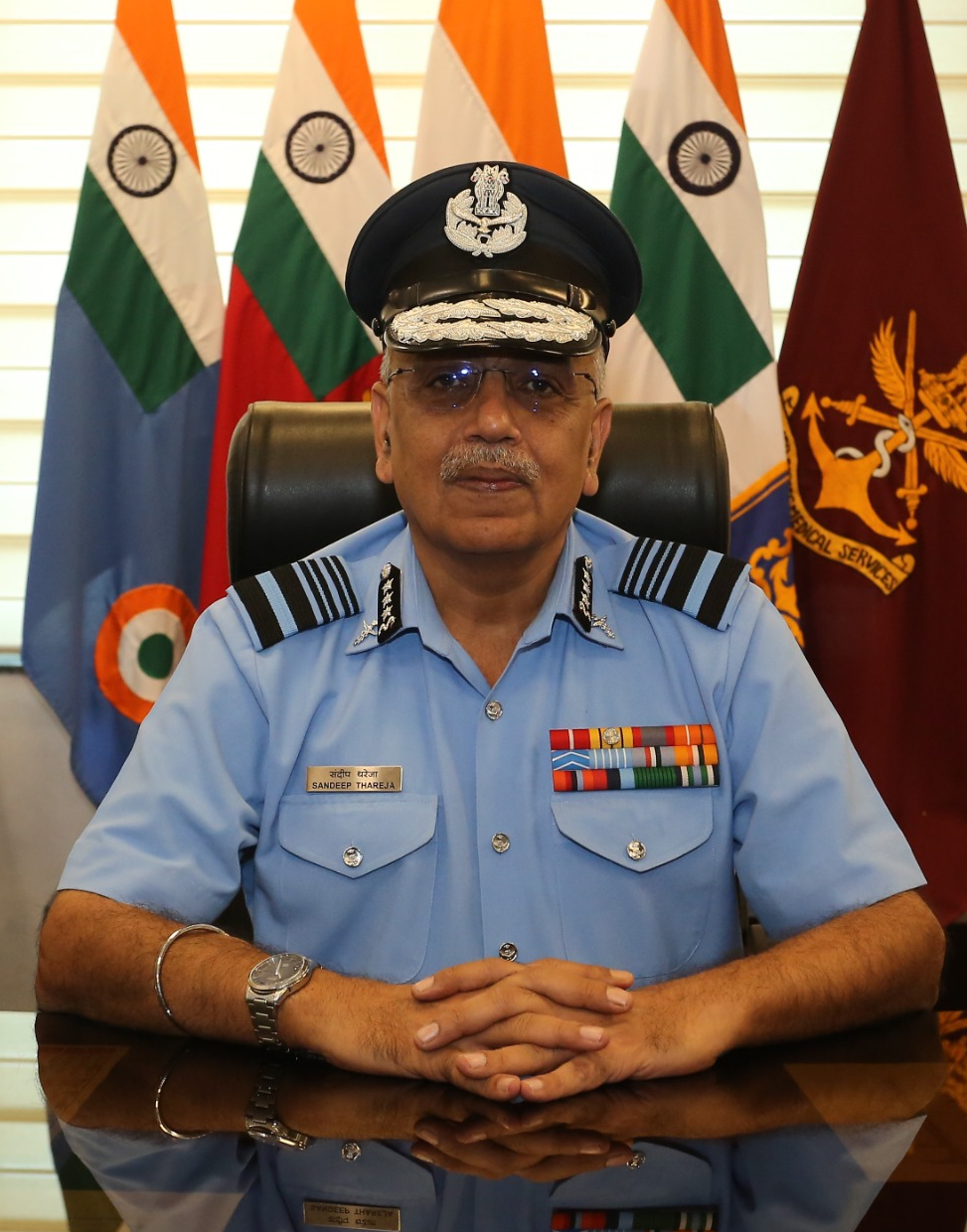

47th Director General Armed Forces Medical Services
- Incumbent
- Assumed office 1 September 2026
- Chief of Defence Staff: N. S. Raja Subramani
- Preceded by: Arti Sarin

Military service
- Allegiance: India
- Branch/service: Indian Air Force
- Years of service: December 1986 – Present
- Rank: Air Marshal
- Commands: Armed Forces Medical College; Command Hospital, Central Command; 167 Military Hospital
- Service number: 37884 MED
- Awards: Sena Medal; Bar to Vishisht Seva Medal

Air Marshal Sandeep Thareja, SM, VSM** is a serving air officer of the Indian Air Force. He is the current and the 47th Director General Armed Forces Medical Services. He was previously serving as the Director General of Medical Services (Air), prior to that he served as the Commandant, Armed Forces Medical College.

== Early life and education ==
The air officer is an alumnus of Armed Forces Medical College, Pune from where he completed his MBBS degree. He then did his MD in Medicine in 1997 and DM in Gastroenterology from the All India Institute of Medical Sciences, New Delhi in 2005, where he was awarded the Best DM Student Award. He is also an alumnus of National Defence College, New Delhi. He has authored over 50 scientific publications in national and international medical journals.

== Military career ==
He was commissioned into the Army Medical Corps in December 1986 from the Armed Forces Medical College, Pune. In a career spanning nearly four decades, the air marshal has held various clinical, academic, operational and administrative appointments. His command and administrative assignments include Commandant, 167 Military Hospital, Brigadier In-Charge Administration and Commander Troops, Base Hospital, Delhi Cantt and Commandant Command Hospital, Central Command.

As a Lieutenant General, he served as the Director & Commandant of Armed Forces Medical College. On permanent secondment to the Indian Air Force, on 12 February 2025, Air Marshal Thareja assumed the appointment of Director General of Medical Services (Air).

On 1 September 2026, Air Marshal Sandeep Thareja took over as the 47th Director General Armed Forces Medical Services succeeding Surgeon Vice Admiral Arti Sarin.

== Awards and decorations ==
During his career, the air officer has been awarded with the Sena Medal in 2022, the Vishisht Seva Medal in 2011 and a Bar to Vishisht Seva Medal in 2024.

| Sena Medal | Bar to Vishisht Seva Medal | Special Service Medal | Sainya Seva Medal |
| High Altitude Medal | Videsh Seva Medal | 75th Independence Anniversary Medal | 50th Independence Anniversary Medal |
| 30 Years Long Service Medal | 20 Years Long Service Medal | 9 Years Long Service Medal | UNAMSIL |
