= Laish =

Laish may refer to:

- Dan (ancient city), formerly known as Laish
- Laish (father of Palti), the father of Palti in the Books of Samuel
- Laish, Uzbekistan
- Laish (band)
- Noam Laish (born 1993), Israeli basketball player
