= Vimal Arora =

Indian Army lieutenant general and dental surgeon

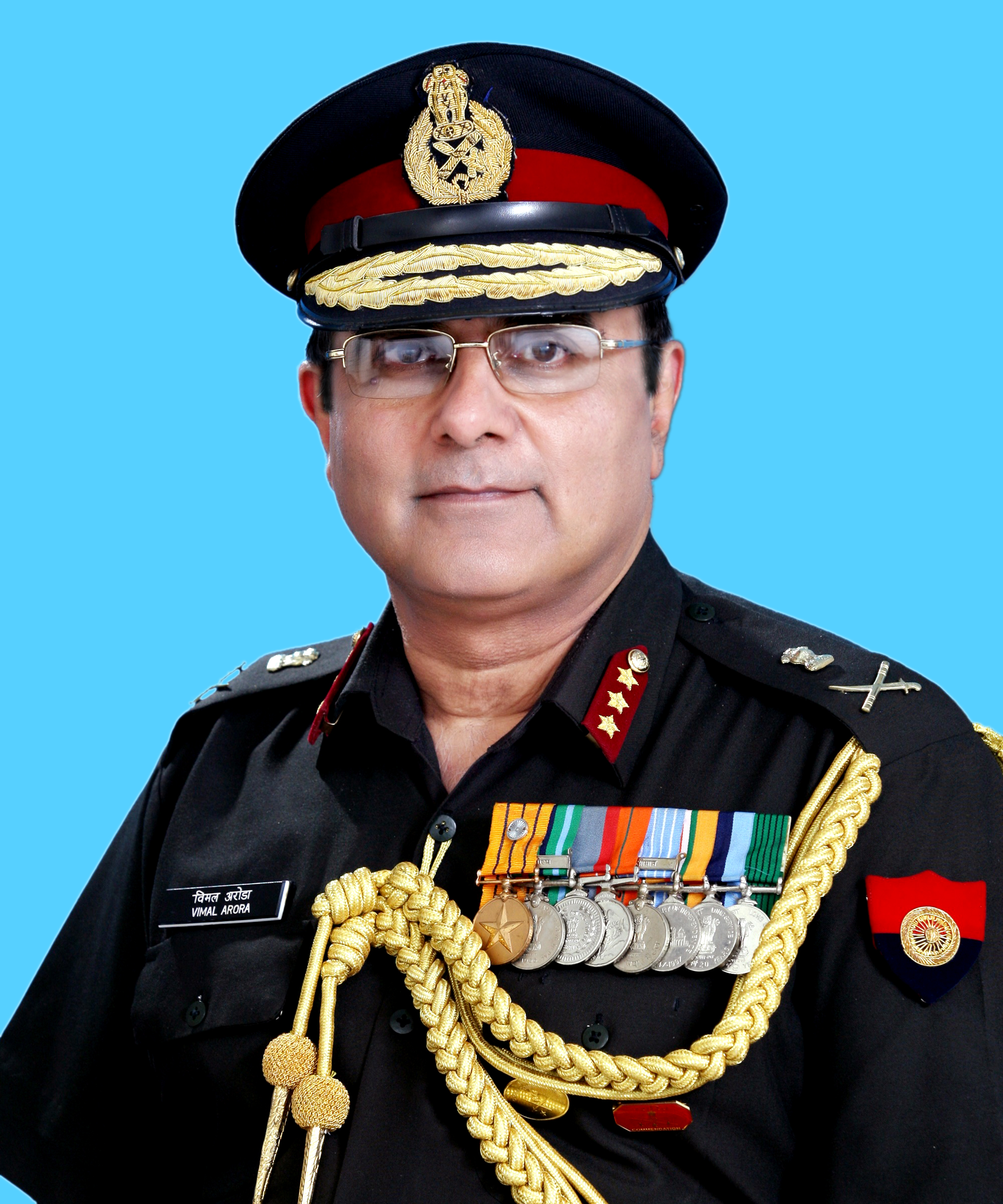
- Lt Gen Vimal Arora in 2015
- Born: Vimal Arora; Lucknow, India
- Military career
- Allegiance: India
- Branch: Indian Army
- Rank: Lieutenant General
- Unit: Army Dental Corps
- Commands: Director General of Dental Services (Army, Navy & Air Force); Colonel Commandant, Army Dental Corps; Command Dental Advisor, Central, Southern & Northern Command
- Awards: Param Vishisht Seva Medal; Ati Vishisht Seva Medal; Bar to Vishisht Seva Medal; Vishisht Seva Medal
- Other work: Chief Clinical Officer, Clove Dental

Lieutenant General Dr Vimal Arora (PVSM, AVSM, VSM & Bar) is a retired Indian Army officer and dental surgeon who served as Director General of Dental Services in the Armed Forces Medical Services (Indian Army Dental Corps). Following his military retirement in 2015, he became Chief Clinical Officer of Clove Dental.

== Military career ==
Vimal Arora was commissioned into the Army Dental Corps of the Indian Army in 1977. He served in the Indian Armed Forces for over 37 years. During his military career, he rose to the rank of Lieutenant General and held the position of Director General of Dental Services (DGDS), the highest rank in the Indian Armed Forces dental hierarchy. In this role, he was responsible for managing dental services across the Army, Navy, and Air Force, overseeing more than 700 dental surgeons. He served as Colonel Commandant of the Army Dental Corps. He also served as Honorary Dental Surgeon to the President of India.

In 2007, Arora served as organizing secretary for the 35th Annual Conference of the Indian Prosthodontic Society, held in New Delhi.

=== International recognition ===
In 2013, Arora presented on military dentistry at the FDI World Military Dental Congress in Istanbul, where he discussed dental service provision in the Indian Armed Forces context. His presentation addressed maxillo-facial prosthodontic rehabilitation for armed forces personnel recovering from combat-related injuries.

== Awards and honors ==
Arora received four Presidential Awards during his military career. In 2015, he received the Param Vishisht Seva Medal in recognition of his distinguished service. His previous awards included the Ati Vishisht Seva Medal in 2014, the Bar to Vishisht Seva Medal in 2006, and the Vishisht Seva Medal in 1996.

In 2015, Arora received the Sushruta Award from the Indian Dental Association for his contributions to oral healthcare. The award was presented by former President Dr A.P.J. Abdul Kalam.

== Post-military career ==
In March 2015, following his retirement from the Indian Armed Forces, Arora joined Clove Dental as Director and Chief Clinical Officer. At the time of his appointment, Clove Dental was expanding its dental clinic network. Express Healthcare noted his appointment as part of the company's effort to build dental infrastructure through experienced leadership.

== Research and publications ==
Arora has authored and co-authored research on oral health assessment and implantology. His publications include a 2019 cross-sectional study on oral health assessment in urban Indian adults using intraoral cameras, published in the Journal of Multidisciplinary Dental Research. He co-authored clinical research on immediate dental implant placement using different bone augmentation materials, published in the Medical Journal of Armed Forces India. He has also co-authored research on the correlation between oral health and quality of life indices.

He is a co-author of the textbook Military Dentistry: Terrain, Trends and Training (2005), which addresses dental considerations specific to military personnel and operational environments.
