= Army Hospital Research and Referral =

Geography
- Location: New Delhi, India
- Coordinates: 28.583814°N 77.158569°E

Organisation
- Care system: Public
- Type: Armed forces hospital, teaching centre, nursing college

Services
- Beds: 1000+

History
- Constructed: Late 1980s

Links
- Lists: Hospitals in India
- Other links: List of Armed Forces Hospitals In India

Army Hospital (Research And Referral), also known as Army Hospital (R&R), AH (R&R) and RR Hospital, is the apex flagship medical care centre for the Indian Armed Forces. Completed in the mid 1990s, the hospital, which includes a teaching hospital and nursing college, is located in Delhi Cantonment, New Delhi. It is the only Armed Forces Medical Services hospital to be commanded by a Lieutenant General rank officer and provides for 27 sub-specialties. The hospital is also meant to cater to the President of India and the chiefs of the military.

== About ==
The construction of the hospital was undertaken by the Military Engineer Services and private contractors. The work started in the late 1980s and was completed in the next few years. The hospital is one of the largest military hospitals in Asia, initially constructed with over 600 beds. Notably, the hospital treats the President of India and the chiefs of the military.

In an interview in 2018, Lt. General U.K. Sharma, commandant of Army Hospital (R&R) said that, "We treat SAARC nation’s armed forces’ patients here too. There is a quota for each country. MEA gives a sanction and payment comes from MEA. Exchange programme with CIS nations for doctors and para medics. There are two missions going to Uzbekistan and one to Egypt. Return visits are MEA-MOD joint decision". The first patient simulator in India was acquired by the hospital. The first cervical disc replacement and bi-level cervical disc replacement in Asia was carried out in the hospital's neurosurgery department in 2002 and 2003 respectively. The assisted reproductive technology facility at the hospital undertook 500 test tube pregnancies in 2012 itself.

The Army Organ and Retrieval Transplantation Organisation (AORTA), formed in 2006, handles organ donations at RR Hospital. In 2018, an entire unit of the Territorial Army submitted applications pledging their organs. The conversion rate for organ donations at RR Hospital is among the best worldwide. Brigadier YP Bakshi was shot in Meerut; following his death, RR Hospital harvested his organs, liver, kidneys, eyes and heart valves.

=== Patients and deaths ===
Patients have included Field Marshal Sam Manekshaw, Wing Commander Abhinandan Varthaman, and Sonia Gandhi. Notable people who have died at the hospital include: former President Pranab Mukherjee; Marshal Arjan Singh, the only five-star rank officer of the Indian Air Force; former Navy Chief Admiral Sushil Kumar; Lt. General Sagat Singh; and Colonel Narendra "Bull" Kumar. Lance Naik Hanumanthappa Koppad, who was found alive after being buried under snow for six days in the Siachen Glacier, was shifted to RR Hospital, where he died two days later. Naik Raj Kishor Singh, who was injured in the 2016 Uri attack, underwent treatment at RR Hospital, but soon after died due to injuries sustained during the attack.

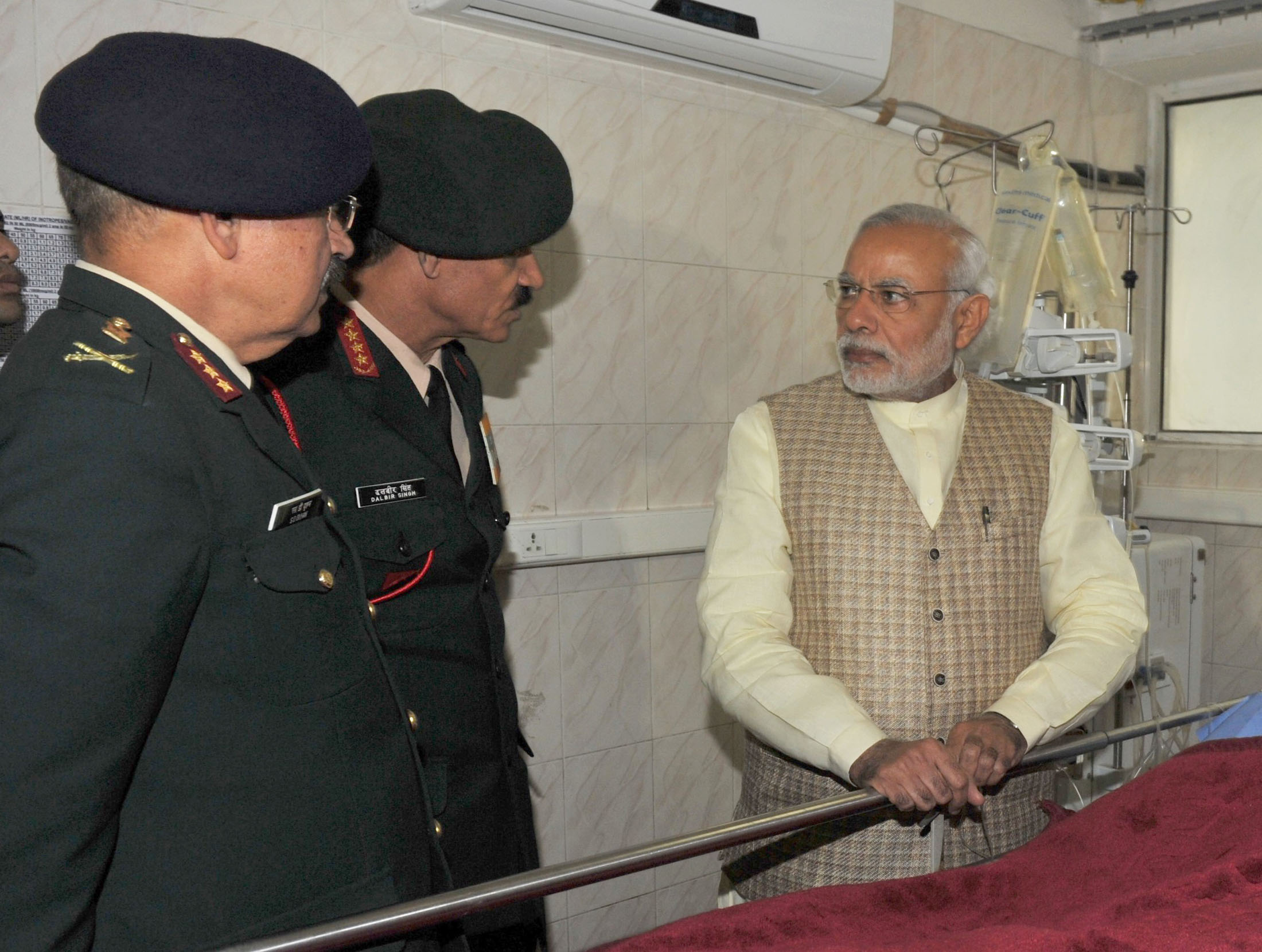
The Prime Minister Narendra Modi visits Siachen survivor Lance Naik Hanumanthappa at Army’s Research & Referral Hospital, in New Delhi on 9 February 2016. The Chief of Army Staff, General Dalbir Singh is also seen.

=== Leadership ===
Commandant of Army Hospital (R&R):

- 2011 – Lt Gen K K Singh
- 2012 – Lt Gen AS Narula
- 2014 – Lt Gen M K Unni
- 2017 – Lt Gen A K Das
- 2018 – Lt Gen U K Sharma
- 2019 – Lt Gen Rajat Datta
- 2025 - Lt Gen Avinash Das
- 2020 - Lt Gen Joy Chatterjee

== College of Nursing ==
Nursing students from College of Nursing, Army Hospital (R&R) are commissioned into the Military Nursing Service (MNS) as lieutenants. After being posted into the MNS, the lieutenants would go on to be posted across the nation in various Armed Forces Hospitals. The first batch graduated on 24 August 2018 with a B Sc (H) Nursing degree, while the second batch of 27 nursing students were commissioned on 25 September 2019. In 2017, the 58th batch of Probationer Nurses consisting of 28 nurses were commissioned into the MNS.

== See also ==
- List of Armed Forces Hospitals In India
- Command Hospital
