= Noam Laish =

Israeli basketball player

Noam Laish נועם ליש
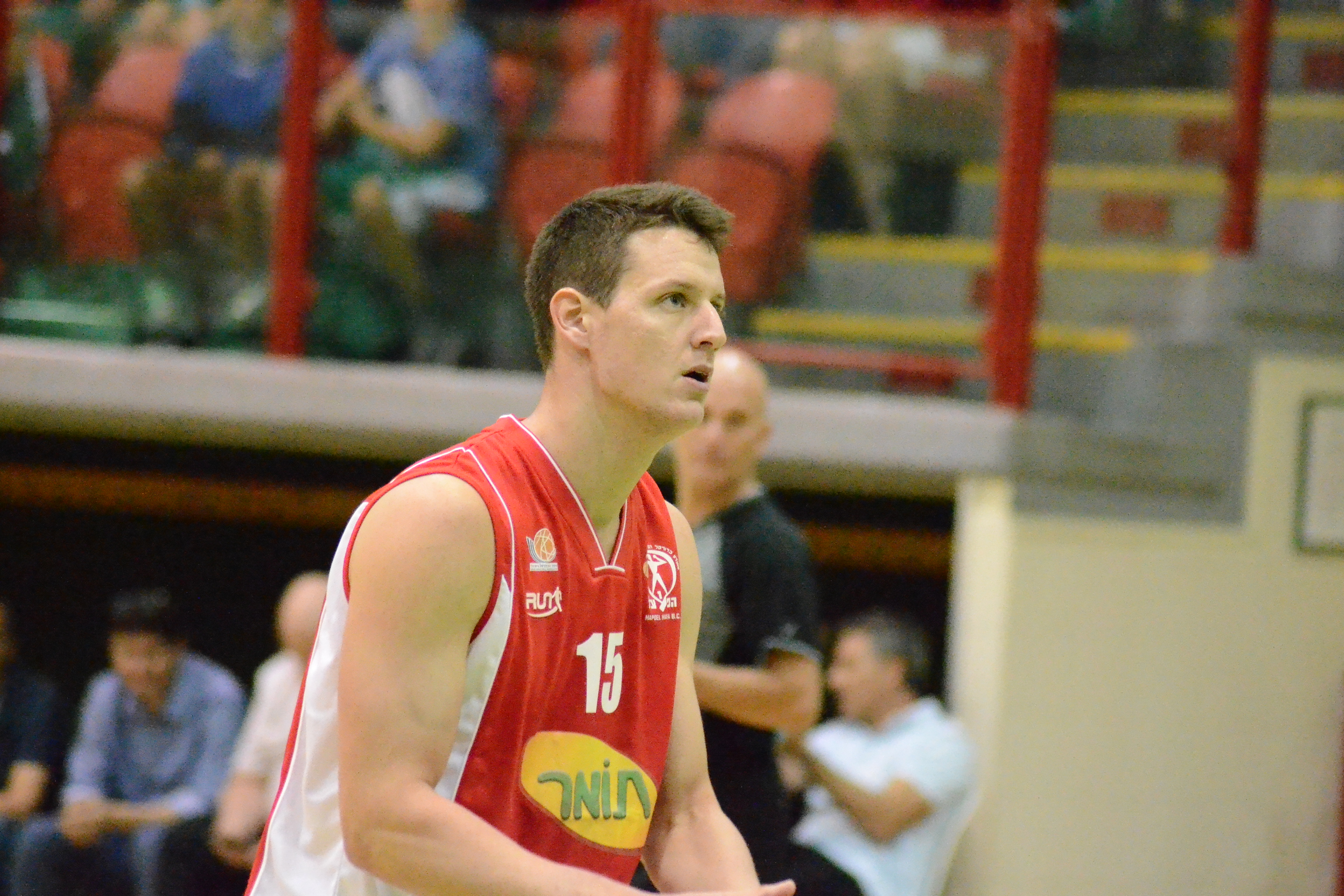
- Noam Laish with Hapoel Be'er Sheva in 2020

No. 10 – Elitzur Yavne
- Position: Shooting guard / point guard
- League: Liga Leumit

Personal information
- Born: August 22, 1993 (age 33) Be'er Ya'akov, Israel
- Listed height: 1.86 m (6 ft 1 in)
- Listed weight: 80 kg (176 lb)

Career information
- College: Maine (2011–2012)
- Playing career: 2011–present

Career history
- 2012–2014: Ironi Kiryat Ata
- 2014–2016: Maccabi Ashdod
- 2017: Maccabi Kiryat Gat
- 2017–2018: Hapoel Ramat Gan
- 2018–2019: Hapoel Haifa
- 2019–2020: Hapoel Be'er Sheva
- 2019–2020: Hapoel Haifa
- 2020–2021: Maccabi Ashdod
- 2021–present: Elitzur Yavne

Noam Laish (Hebrew: נועם ליש; born 22 August 1993) is an Israeli professional basketball player for Elitzur Yavne of the Liga Leumit. He played college basketball for one season with the Maine Black Bears.

== Professional career ==
Laish grew up in Timrat and began his career with the Jezreel Valley team in the high school Premier League. He played at the 2009 FIBA Europe Under-16 Championship, averaging 10.5 points, 3.1 rebounds, 2 assists and 1.5 steals in 25 minutes of play. After graduating from high school in November 2011 he moved to play in the United States at the University of Maine.

After about a year, Leish returned to Israel and signed with Elitzur Kiryat Ata from the National League under the coaching of Sharon Avrahami. [3] 2 Ass

In the 2014–15 season, Laish signed with Maccabi Ashdod Be'er Tuvia in the basketball Premier League for three years. In his first season with the team, he played an average of 5.9 minutes, scoring an average of 1.2. In his second season in Ashdod, Laish did not play much when he was a partner in two games in which he scored a single three, after which he was injured and finished the season [4]. Moved to Maccabi Kiryat Gat also in the Premier League and played in the media 18 games 15.5 minutes on average and scored 3.7 points per game, at the end of this season Kiryat Gat was relegated to the National League after finishing in last place.

In the 2017–2018 season, Leish signed with Hapoel Ramat Gan-Givatayim from the national league in the media, averaging 8.4 points and 1.9 rebounds per game.

In the 2018–2019 season, he signed with Hapoel Haifa from the national league, scoring 9.4 points, 2 rebounds and 1.7 assists per game on average. He finished first in the league in three-point shooting percentage at 44.12%.

In August 2019, he signed with Hapoel Be'er Sheva in the Premier League.

In December 2019, he left Hapoel Be'er Sheva and returned to Hapoel Haifa.

In August 2020, he left Hapoel Haifa and returned to Maccabi Ashdod.
