= List of Armed Forces Hospitals In India =

As of 2020, there are 112 Military Hospitals, 12 Air Force Hospitals and 10 Naval Hospitals in India.

== Indian Air Force ==
S.No.	Hospital	Air Base	City, State	Ref
1	Command Hospital	HQ, Training Command	Bengaluru, Karnataka	
2	3 Air Force Hospital	Amla AFS	Betul, Madhya Pradesh	
3	4 Air Force Hospital	Kalaikunda AFS	Kharagpur, West Bengal	
4	5 Air Force Hospital	Jorhat AFS	Jorhat, Assam	
5	6 Air Force Hospital	Sulur AFS	Coimbatore, Tamil Nadu	
6	7 Air Force Hospital	Chakeri AFS	Kanpur, Uttar Pradesh	
7	9 Air Force Hospital	Halwara AFS	Ludhiana, Punjab	
8	10 Air Force Hospital	Hasimara AFS	Alipurduar, West Bengal	
9	11 Air Force Hospital	Hindon AFS	Ghaziabad, Uttar Pradesh	
10	12 Air Force Hospital	Gorakhpur AFS	Gorakhpur, Uttar Pradesh	
11	14 Air Force Hospital	AFA, Dundigul	Hyderabad, Telangana	
12	15 Air Force Hospital	Jaisalmer AFS	Jaisalmer, Rajasthan	

== Indian Army ==
Hospital	State
181 Military Hospital Tenga	Arunachal Pradesh
188 Military Hospital Likabali	Arunachal Pradesh
151 Base Hospital Guwahati	Assam
155 Base Hospital Tezpur	Assam
160 Military Hospital Silchar	Assam
162 Military Hospital Dinjan	Assam
180 Military Hospital Missamari	Assam
188 Military Hospital Likabali	Assam
Military Hospital Danapur	Bihar
Military Hospital Gaya	Bihar
Military Hospital Panaji	Goa
Base Hospital, Delhi Cantt	Delhi
Army Hospital (R&R), Delhi Cantt	Delhi
Military Hospital Ahmedabad	Gujarat
Military Hospital Vadodara	Gujarat
Military Hospital Bhuj	Gujarat
Military Hospital Dharangadhara	Gujarat
Military Hospital Jamnagar	Gujarat
Military Hospital Ambala	Haryana
Command Hospital Chandimandir Cantt	Haryana
Military Hospital Hisar	Haryana
Military Hospital Kasauli	Himachal Pradesh
Military Hospital Shimla	Himachal Pradesh
Military Hospital Bakloh	Himachal Pradesh
Military Hospital Dalhousie	Himachal Pradesh
Military Hospital Palampur	Himachal Pradesh
Military Hospital Yol	Himachal Pradesh
171 Military Hospital Samba	Jammu and Kashmir
Command Hospital Udhampur	Jammu and Kashmir
Military Hospital Doda	Jammu and Kashmir
92 Base Hospital Srinagar	Jammu and Kashmir
150 General Hospital Rajouri	Jammu and Kashmir
166 Military Hospital Jammu	Jammu and Kashmir
168 Military Hospital Drugmulla	Jammu and Kashmir
169 Military Hospital Surankot	Jammu and Kashmir
170 Military Hospital Akhnoor	Jammu and Kashmir
Military Hospital Namkum	Jharkhand
Military Hospital Ramgarh	Jharkhand
Military Hospital Belgavi	Karnataka
Military Hospital Kannur	Kerala
Military Hospital Thiruvananthapuram	Kerala
Military Hospital Kargil	Ladakh
153 General Hospital Leh	Ladakh
Military Hospital Bhopal	Madhya Pradesh
Military Hospital Gwalior	Madhya Pradesh
Military Hospital Sagar	Madhya Pradesh
Military Hospital Jabalpur	Madhya Pradesh
Military Hospital Ambedkar Nagar	Madhya Pradesh
Military Hospital Pachmarhi	Madhya Pradesh
Military Hospital Ahilyanagar	Maharashtra
Military Hospital Sambhajinagar	Maharashtra
Military Hospital Devlali	Maharashtra
Military Hospital Kamptee	Maharashtra
Military Hospital Khadakvasla	Maharashtra
Military Hospital Kirkee	Maharashtra
Command Hospital Pune	Maharashtra
Military Hospital CTC Pune	Maharashtra
Military Hospital Pulgaon	Maharashtra
183 Military Hospital Leimakong	Manipur
Military Hospital Shillong	Meghalaya
154 General Hospital Zakhama	Nagaland
165 Military Hospital Dimapur	Nagaland
Military Hospital Gopalpur	Odisha
Military Hospital Amritsar	Punjab
Military Hospital Jalandhar	Punjab
Military Hospital Patiala	Punjab
159 General Hospital Ferozpur	Punjab
167 Military Hospital Pathankot	Punjab
172 Military Hospital Gurdaspur	Punjab
173 Military Hospital Faridkot	Punjab
174 Military Hospital Bathinda	Punjab
175 Military Hospital Abohar	Punjab
Military Hospital Jodhpur	Rajasthan
Military Hospital Nasirabad	Rajasthan
177 Military Hospital Jalipa	Rajasthan
185 Military Hospital Udaipur	Rajasthan
186 Military Hospital Jaisalmer	Rajasthan
Military Hospital Alwar	Rajasthan
Military Hospital Jaipur	Rajasthan
Military Hospital Kota	Rajasthan
176 Military Hospital Sri Ganganagar	Rajasthan
184 Military Hospital Suratgarh	Rajasthan
187 Military Hospital Bikaner	Rajasthan
178 Military Hospital Gangtok	Sikkim
Military Hospital Avadi	Tamil Nadu
Military Hospital Chennai	Tamil Nadu
Military Hospital Wellington	Tamil Nadu
Military Hospital Golconda	Telangana
Military Hospital Secundrabad	Telangana
182 Military Hospital Agartala	Tripura
Military Hospital Dehradun	Uttarakhand
Military Hospital Lansdowne	Uttarakhand
Military Hospital Ranikhet	Uttarakhand
Military Hospital Roorkee	Uttarakhand
161 Military Hospital Pithoragarh	Uttarakhand
Military Hospital Babina	Uttar Pradesh
Military Hospital Jhansi	Uttar Pradesh
Military Hospital Agra	Uttar Pradesh
Military Hospital Bareilly	Uttar Pradesh
Base Hospital Lucknow	Uttar Pradesh
Command Hospital Lucknow	Uttar Pradesh
Military Hospital Prayagraj	Uttar Pradesh
Military Hospital Faizabad	Uttar Pradesh
Military Hospital Fatehgarh	Uttar Pradesh
Military Hospital Mathura	Uttar Pradesh
Military Hospital Meerut	Uttar Pradesh
Military Hospital Varanasi	Uttar Pradesh
Base Hospital Barrackpore	West Bengal
Command Hospital Kolkata	West Bengal
Military Hospital Panagarh	West Bengal
158 Base Hospital Bengdubi	West Bengal
Military Hospital Lebong	West Bengal
164 Military Hospital Binaguri	West Bengal
179 Military Hospital Kalimpong	West Bengal

== Indian Navy ==
Sno.	Hospital	City, State	Notes/Ref
1	INHS Asvini	Colaba, Mumbai, Maharashtra	Command Hospital
2	INHS Kasturi	Lonavala, Pune, Maharashtra	
3	INHS Jeevanti	Vasco-da-gama, Goa	
4	INHS Patanjali	Karwar, Karnataka	
5	INHS Navjivani	INA Ezhimala, Kerala	
6	INHS Sanjivani	Kochi, Kerala	
7	INHS Kalyani	Visakhapatnam, Andhra Pradesh	
8	INHS Nivarini	Chilka, Odisha	
9	INHS Dhanvantari	Port Blair, Andaman & Nicobar Islands	
10	INHS Sandhani	Karanja, Uran, Raigad, Maharashtra	
11	NH POWAI	Naval Hospital, Bandup west, Mumbai	

== See also ==
- Command Hospital
- Army Medical Corps (India)
- List of Indian Navy bases
- List of Indian Air Force stations
