= John Woodall =

English surgeon

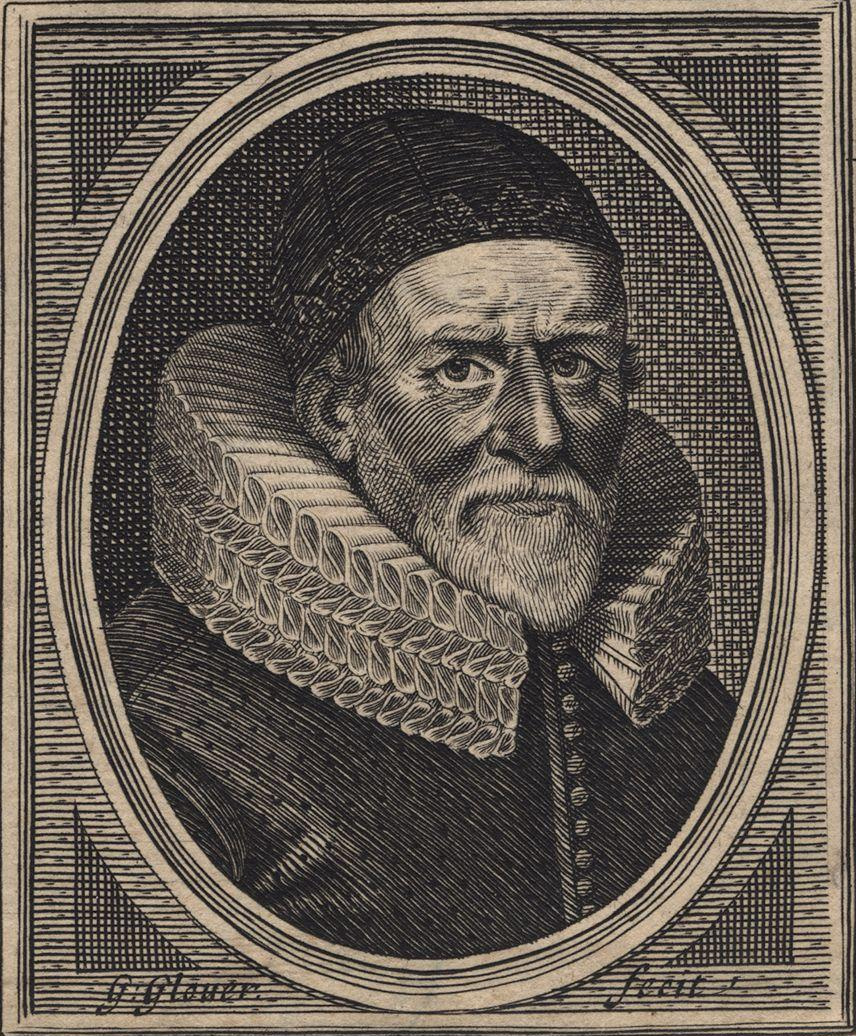
John Woodall, George Glover, published 1639

John Woodall (1570–1643) was an English military surgeon, Paracelsian chemist, businessman, linguist and diplomat. He made a fortune through the stocking of medical chests for the East India Company and later the armed forces of England. He wrote The Surgeon's Mate, the standard text to advise ships' surgeons about medical treatments while at sea. In the book, he makes dietary recommendations which would have prevented the scourge of scurvy if they had been followed.

== Life ==
Woodall was the son of Richard Woodall of Warwick, and was apprenticed around the age of 16 or 17 to a London barber surgeon. He did not finish his apprenticeship, but gained experience from the age of nineteen in 1589 as a surgeon with Lord Willoughby's regiment on its expedition to support the Protestant Henry IV of France and King of Navarre in his campaign against the Catholic League of Normandy. He returned in 1590.

Woodall is known to have then lived and worked as a surgeon in Polonia (Poland) and Stade, a Hanseatic port near Hamburg. While there, he was occasionally employed as a German interpreter by visiting English ambassadors.

In 1599, he was admitted to the Company of Barbers and Surgeons of London as a freeman, but continued to live mainly in Holland until 1603, when he took up residence in Wood Street, London. He was able to offer treatment to victims of the bubonic plague epidemic. At unspecified times in his life, he contracted plague and survived, writing of this, "...for I had it twice, namely at two severall Plague times in my Groyne."

In 1604, James I of England sent an embassy, led by Sir Thomas Smith, Governor of the East India Company, to Poland and possibly to Russia. Woodall was included for his knowledge of the region and command of the languages. John Woodall also gave scurvy "special attention", as it was a common disease amongst English immigrants and seafarers. The association with Smith was fruitful for Woodall, for in 1612, Sir Thomas appointed Woodall to serve as Surgeon General to the East India Company. His duties were described as follows:

"The Said Chiurgion and the Deputy shall have a place of lodging in the Yard, where one of them shall give Attendance every working day from morning until night, to cure any person or persons who may be hurt in the Service of this Company and the like in all their Ships, riding at Anchor at Deptford and Blackwell, and at Erith, where he shall also keepe a Deputy with his chest furnished, to remaine there continually until all the said ships have sayled and appointing fit and able Surgeons and Surgeon's Mates for their ships and services, as also the fitting and furnishing of their Chests with medicines and other appurtenances thereto."

Woodall's career then progressed rapidly with election as a surgeon at St. Bartholomew's Hospital in 1616 where he was a colleague of Sir William Harvey. He was promoted to examiner in the Company of Barbers and Surgeons in 1626, to warden in 1627 and then master in 1633.

He suffered a setback, however, in 1625, when he served a writ on Sir Thomas Merry, a servant of the King who owed Woodall money. For his effrontery to royal privilege, the Lord Steward had Woodall imprisoned. He was briefly released to supervise surgeon's chests for the next fleet at the request of the East India Company, but was then jailed again, and only freed after issuing a contrite apology.

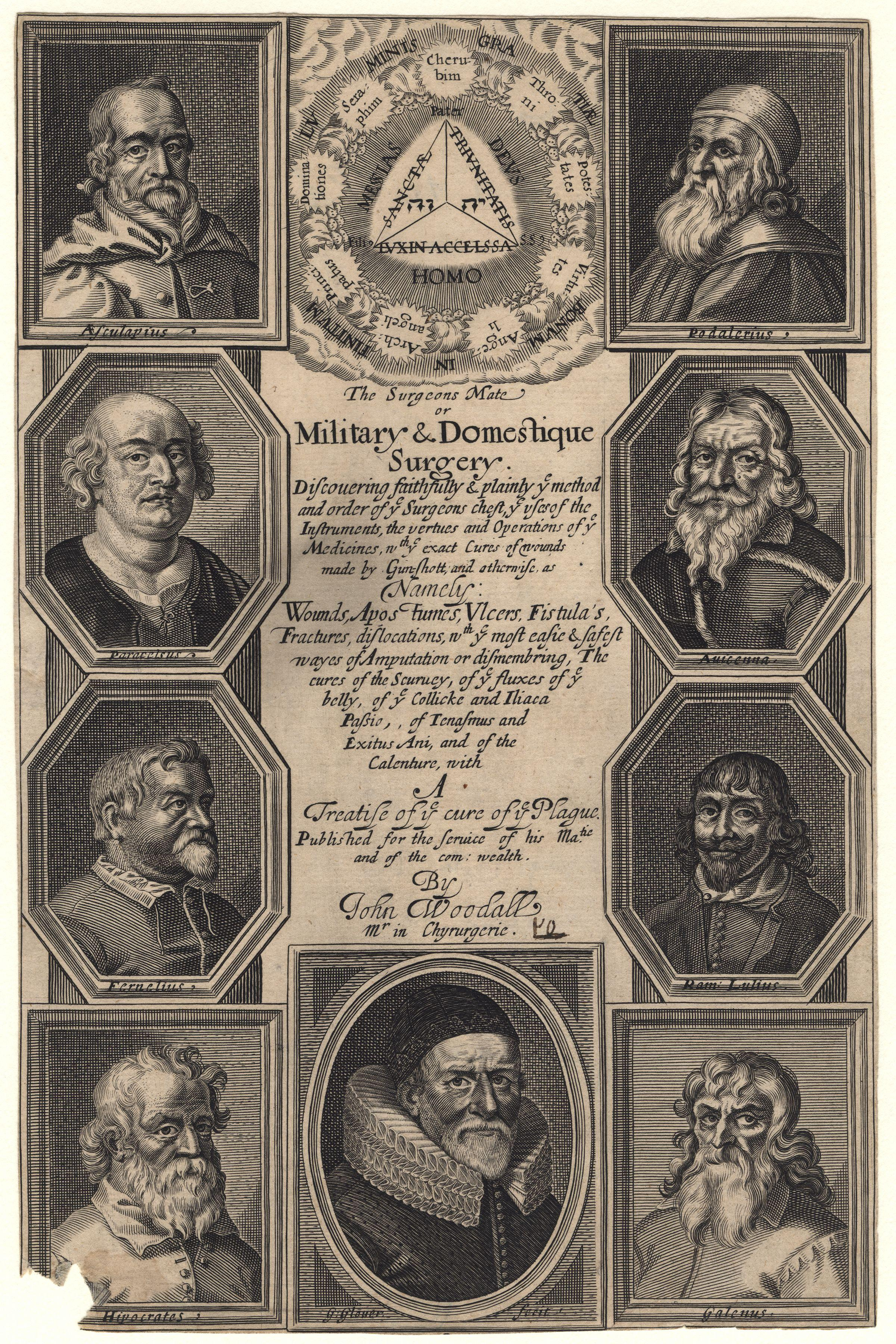
Frontispiece of the 1639 edition of Military and Domestic Surgery by John Woodall.

In 1626, the Privy Council decided to pay the Company of Barbers and Surgeons fixed allowances to furnish medical chests for both the army and navy, and Woodall was appointed to supervise this scheme in addition to his long-standing similar commitment to the East India Company.

He was eventually dismissed by the East India Company in 1635 for financial reasons, but retained a monopoly on supplying the company's medical chests until he died in 1643, aged 73.

== The Surgeon's Mate ==
The first edition of The Surgeon's Mate was published in 1617. Later editions contained treatise on

"for the better curing of Wounds made by Gunshot"
"of that most fearefull and contagious Disease called the Plague"
and "A Treatise of Gangrena... chiefly for the Amputation or Dismembering of any Member of the mortified part."

Pages 160–176 to are devoted to "the scurvy called in Latine Scorbutum."

We have in our owne country here many excellent remedies generally knowne, as namely, Scurvy-grasse, Horse-Reddish roots, Nasturtia Aquatica, Wormwood, Sorrell, and many other good meanes... to the cure of those which live at home...they also helpe some Sea-men returned from farre who by the only natural disposition of the fresh aire and amendment of diet, nature herselfe in effect doth the Cure without other helps. At sea, he states that experience shows that the Lemmons, Limes, Tamarinds, Oranges, and other choice of good helps in the Indies... do farre exceed any that can be carried tither from England.

== Bibliography ==
- Bishop, WJ. The Early History of Surgery. London: Oldbourne Book Co. Ltd., 1962
- Dobson, Jessie and Walker, R. Milnes. Barbers and Barber-Surgeons. Oxford: Blackwell Scientific Publications, 1979.
- Druett, Joan. Rough Medicine: Surgeons at Sea in the Age of Sail. New York: Routledge, 2000.
- Graham, Harvey. The Story of Surgery. Garden City, New York: Halcyon House, 1943.
- Proceedings of the 12th Annual History of Medicine Days, WA Whitelaw - March 2003
