= Laishram Nabakishore Singh =

Indian herbalist and physician (1938–2024)

- Born: 1 March 1938; Sagolband Khanam Leirak, Manipur, India
- Died: 9 September 2024 (aged 86); Sagolband Khamnam Leirak, Manipur, India
- Occupations: Physician; Herbalist
- Known for: Herbal medicine
- Parent(s): L. Gouramani; Dhani
- Awards: Padma Shri; Press Information Bureau Award; Manipur Voluntary Health Association Award; Karmayogi Award; Dr. Ambedkar Distinguished Service Award

Laishram Nabakishore Singh (1 March 1938 – 9 September 2024) is an Indian teacher, herbalist and physician of traditional medicine, known for his therapeutic protocol for kidney stones. He is reported to have the largest collection of renal stones in India, exceeding one million in number, which has earned him a mention in the Limca Book of Records. He is a recipient of several honours including the fourth highest Indian civilian award of the Padma Shri.

== Biography ==
Nabakishore Singh was born on 1 March 1938 to L. Gouramani and Dhani at Sagolband Khanam Leirak, in the Northeast Indian state of Manipur, in a financially poor family. His parents were daily wage labourers and though he started his schooling at Budhimanjuri High School, he had to stop it at 8th standard. Singh learned traditional medicine from his father, who used herbal medicine and enhanced his knowledge by his own researches of indigenous plants. While working as a teacher at the Government Primary School, he discovered that he had kidney stone which he is reported to have successfully treated with his own medicines.

Singh pursued medical practice at his residence at Sagolband Khamnam Leirak in Imphal West, along with his regular job as a Hindi teacher at the Government School and turned to full-time practice after his retirement from the school. He is known to have treated over 200,000 persons, using home-made herbal medicines. He started collecting the kidney stones of the patients he treated as a hobby and the collection is reported to be exceeding 1.2 million in number; Limca Book of Records have recorded the achievement. He is also known to be a philanthropist, and the poor patients are reported to be provided free medical treatment. He has written a book of medicine, Role of Herbals in Urinary Tract and Stone Case Treatment and a book of poems, Chummi Haina Loubra, Lalli Haina Loubra?, which has run into its 15th edition.

The Personification or Incarnation of Sacrifice is a documentary on the life and medical practice of Singh. He received the Press Information Bureau Award of the Government of India in 1996. The Government honoured him again, in 2001, by including him in the Republic Day honours list for the civilian honour of the Padma Shri. He is also a recipient of Manipur Voluntary Health Association Award (1999), Karmayogi Award (2005) and Dr. Ambedkar Fellowship (2006).
