= Bijoy Nandan Shahi =

Indian cardiologist

Bijoy Nandan Shahi is an Indian cardiologist from Gurgaon and Lieutenant General in the Indian Armed Forces. In 2002 he was appointed Director General of the Armed Forces Medical Services. He was honoured by the Government of India in 2004 with the Padma Bhushan award for medicine.
