= Military Nursing Service =

Nursing Service branch of the Indian Army

- Crest of the Military Nursing Service
- Active: 1 October 1926–Present
- Country: United Kingdom; India
- Allegiance: British India (1926–1947); India (1947–Present)
- Branch: British Indian Army; Indian Army
- Motto: Service with a Smile
- Anniversaries: October 1 (Raising Day)

Commanders
- ADG MNS: Major General Rachel Thomas

The Indian Military Nursing Services (MNS) is a part of the Armed Forces Medical Services (AFMS) of the Indian Army, originally formed under British rule in 1888. Military nurses work in Army hospitals, field hospitals, command hospitals, and other military medical establishments.

Officers in the MNS (Corps) are granted permanent commission and Short Service Commission , SSC Nursing Officers and can opt for Permanent Commission based on selection and vacancy later, they are commissioned as officers in the Indian Army. Their ranks, commissioning, and promotions are officially recognized and published in the Government of India’s weekly Gazette Notification. This official document lists the names of officers upon commissioning and promotion within the Military Nursing Services

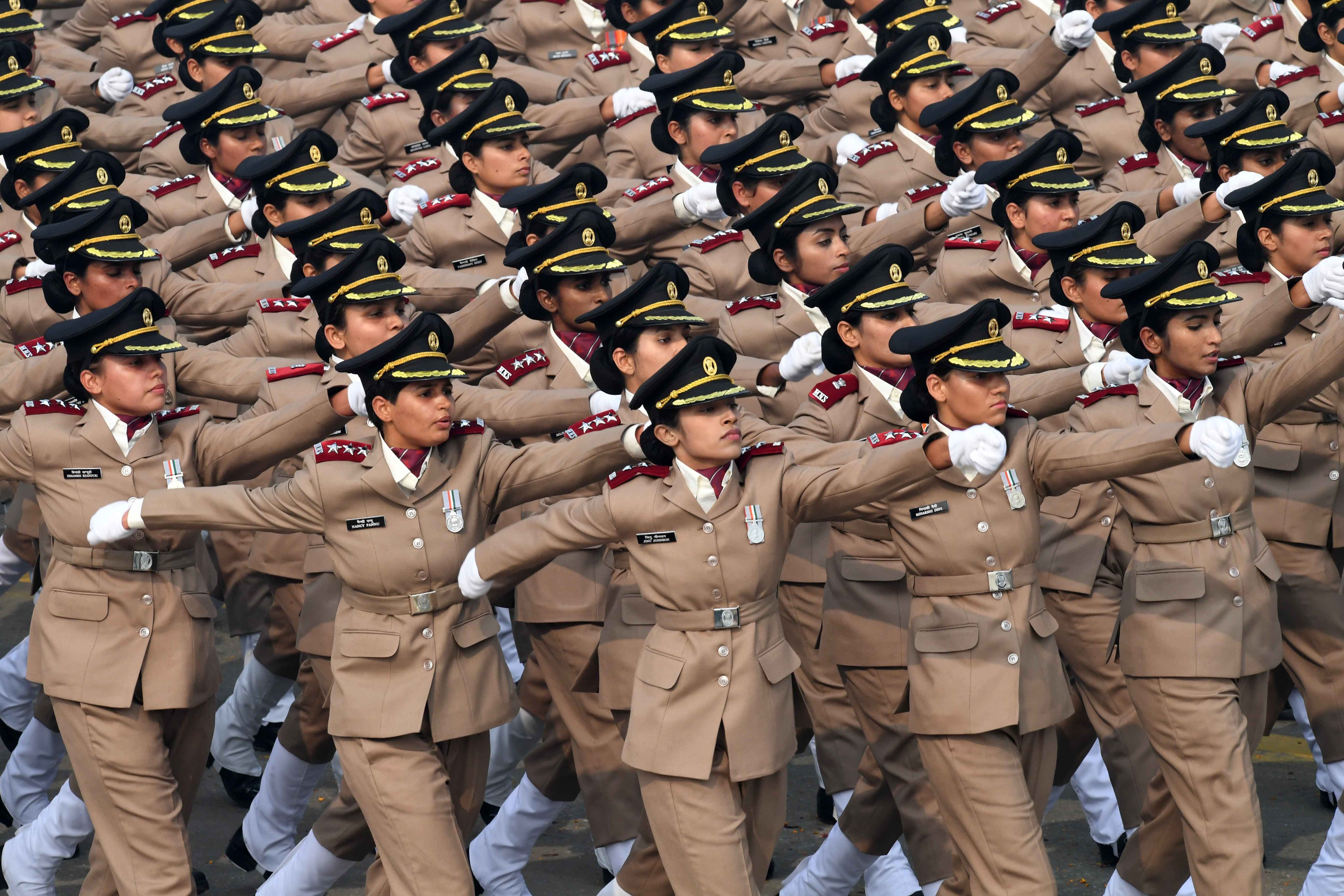
Indian Military Nurses participated in Republic day parade 2024

== History ==
=== First World War ===
The Indian Army Military Nursing Service has its origin in the Army Nursing Service formed in 1888 as part of the British Army. The force went through many changes in its years of existence. In 1893, it was designated as Indian Army Nursing Service. The force went through further changes in 1902, when the Indian Nursing Service and the Army Nursing Service were combined and on 27 March 1902, it was redesignated to Queen Alexandra's Imperial Military Nursing Service. At the outbreak of the World War in 1914 there were just fewer than 300 nurses in the QAIMNS, by the end of the war this had raised to 10,404. The Army nurses served in Flanders, the Mediterranean, the Balkans, the Middle East and onboard hospital ships. Of the 200 plus army nurses died on active service, many were Indians. After the war on 1 October 1926, the Nursing Services was made a permanent part of British Indian Army. This date is now celebrated as the Corps day of Military Nursing Service, though in actual its origins occurred 45 five years before (many Corps of the Army) the Army Medical Corps also traces its origin to more than hundreds of years back in the similar way, though it was constituted in the present form in 1948.|

=== Second World War ===
With the outbreak of the Second world war, nurses once again found themselves serving all over the world, including Singapore, Burma, Italy, Mesopotamia, Ceylon, Egypt and Western Africa. The changing working conditions and wartime shortages led to changes in uniform. Khaki slacks and battledress blouses replaced the grey and scarlet ward dress and rank insignia was adopted to signify the officer status of the nurses. In the Far East, the fall of Hong Kong and Singapore led to many army nurses (including Indian) being captured by the Japanese and endured terrible hardships and deprivations of the Far East prisoner-of-war camps. During the middle of the war in 1943, the Indian arm of the Nursing Services was separated through Indian Military Nursing Service Ordinance, 1943 and redesignated, thereby constituting the Indian Military Nursing Service (IMNS). The IMNS was an auxiliary subject to the provisions of the Indian Army Act, 1911. However they were of commissioned officers ranking equally with Indian commissioned officers. This was the first time in the history of the Indian Army women were granted commissioned officer ranks.

=== Post Independence ===
After the independence in 1950, the Government of India constituted the Military Nursing Service (MNS) by issuing Army Instruction 274/50, to set the terms and conditions of service for the grant of regular commissions in the MNS forming part of the regular Army, subject to the Army Act, 1950. The IMNS stood subsumed in the MNS as on 12 August 1950, and the auxiliary force called IMNS formally cease to exist. The MNS was constituted as an all women, all officer Corps of the Indian Army, and it remains so. On 23 November 1954 the Central Government made the Army Rules, 1954 and brought MNS under the Army Rules along with every other Corps/ Service of the regular Army.

Army Rules and Orders

Subsequently, on 3 January 1959, through Army Instruction 4/59, the Government of India re-designated the rank of the officers in the MNS to conform to the nomenclature used by the other officers of the regular Army. After having re-designated the rank in the MNS by the Government, the Chief of Army Staff (COAS) through Army Order 501/63 laid down that the MNS Officers are required to salute and are entitled to salutes in the manner as other Commissioned Officers of the Army.

On 5 December 1986, the Government of India issued the Defence Service Regulations, Regulations for the Army, 1987 for the administration of the regular Army. The said regulations addresses the MNS as a Corps/Service, and stated that officers in the MNS are Army Officers and will rank equally with male officers of the same titular rank, and on 5 December 1993, the Government of India amended the Army Rules 1954 and inserted the Rule 16A dealing with the retirement of officers of the regular Army from all Corps/ Services including the MNS.

The Military Nursing Service is part of the Armed Forces Medical Services (AFMS). The AFMS consists of Army Medical Corps (AMC), Army Dental Corps (ADC). The AFMS personnel serve in the medical establishments of Army, Navy and Air Force. After independence, the Officers of MNS have not only served in India but have also played a role in United Nations peace keeping missions abroad in UN missions to Lebanon, Cambodia, Somalia and scores of other Nations. Many of such missions are still active and serve in hostile conditions in UN.

== Rank structure ==
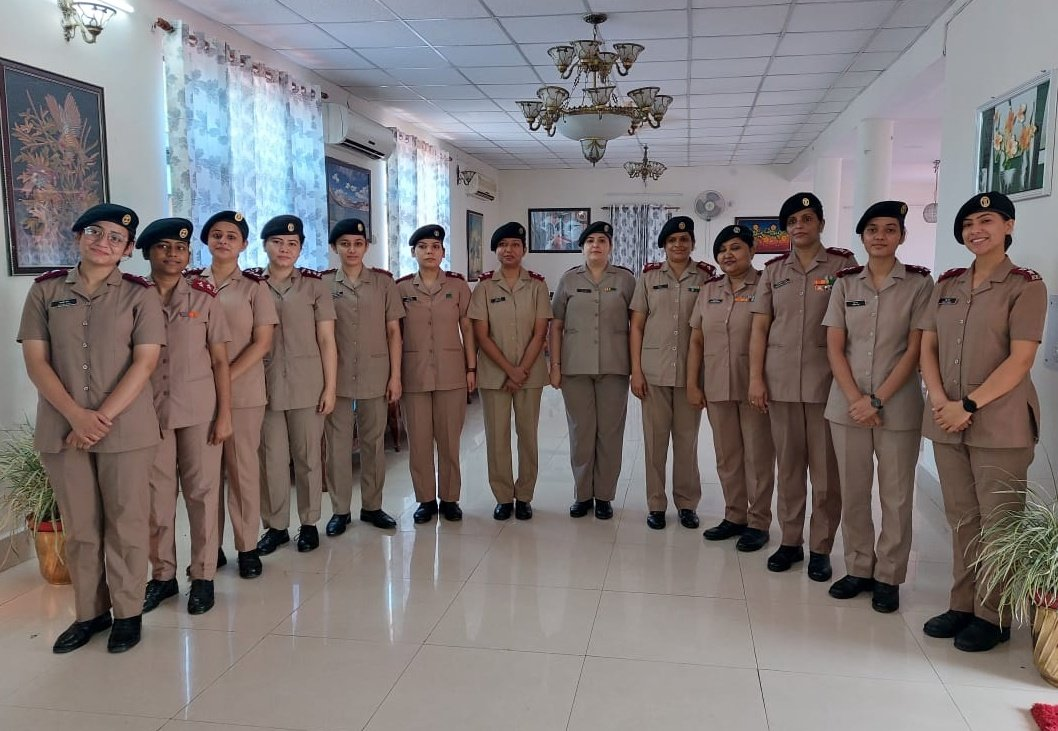
Officers of the Military Nursing Service

Military Nursing Service (MNS) Officer Ranks – India
Rank	Insignia	Appointment	Superannuation Age	Pay Level
Lieutenant	Insignia of Lieutenant MNS	Nursing Officer	—N/a	Level 10 (PB-3)
Captain	Insignia of Captain MNS	Ward in-charge	—N/a	Level 10B (PB-3)
Major	Insignia of Major MNS	Senior Nursing Officer	—N/a	Level 11 (PB-3)
Lieutenant Colonel	Insignia of Lieutenant Colonel MNS	Matron / Training In-charge	60 years	Level 12A (PB-3)
Colonel	Insignia of Colonel MNS	Principal Matron / Admin Head	60 years	Level 13 (PB-4)
Brigadier	Insignia of Brigadier MNS	Deputy Director General MNS (DDG MNS)	60 years	Level 13A (PB-4)
Major General	Insignia of Major General MNS	Additional Director General (ADG MNS)	60 years	Level 14

Nursing Officers are posted to India's Most premier Military Hospitals across India. Presently there are no personnel equivalent to JCOs/OR in the Military Nursing Service. Other para-medical personnel such as Nursing Assistants and Ambulance Assistants are part of Army Medical Corps

== Qualification and training ==
To qualify for the Military Nursing Services, only female applicants are accepted, who need to clear the NEET-UG examination. Candidates undergo academic evaluation and a comprehensive medical examination to ensure they meet the standards required for commissioning as nursing officers in the Indian Armed Forces. Once selected, they are enrolled in the BSc Nursing courses across six College of Nursing institutions of the Armed Forces Medical Services (AFMS).

== Gallantry and Distinguished Service Awards ==
Officers of the Military Nursing Service have been awarded 3 Sena Medals (SM), 3 Param Vishisht Seva Medals (PVSM), 17 Ati Vishisht Seva Medals (AVSM) and 47 Vishisht Seva Medals (VSM) for distinguished service.
