= Laishram Jyotin Singh =

Officer in the Army Medical Corps of the Indian Army

Major Laishram Jyotin Singh AC
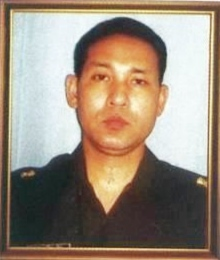
- Portrait of Maj (Dr.) Laishram Jyotin Singh
- Born: 14 May 1972; Manipur, India
- Died: 26 February 2010 (aged 37); Kabul, Afghanistan
- Military career
- Allegiance: India
- Branch: Indian Army
- Service years: 2003–2010
- Rank: Major
- Service number: MS-14522F (short-service commission); MR-08609M (regular commission)
- Unit: Army Medical Corps
- Awards: Ashok Chakra

Major Laishram Jyotin Singh, AC was an Officer in the Army Medical Corps of the Indian Army, who died fighting a suicide bomber during the attack on the Indian Embassy in Kabul. Major Singh was awarded the Ashoka Chakra, the highest peacetime gallantry award in the Indian Armed Forces on 26 January, 2011.

== Biography ==
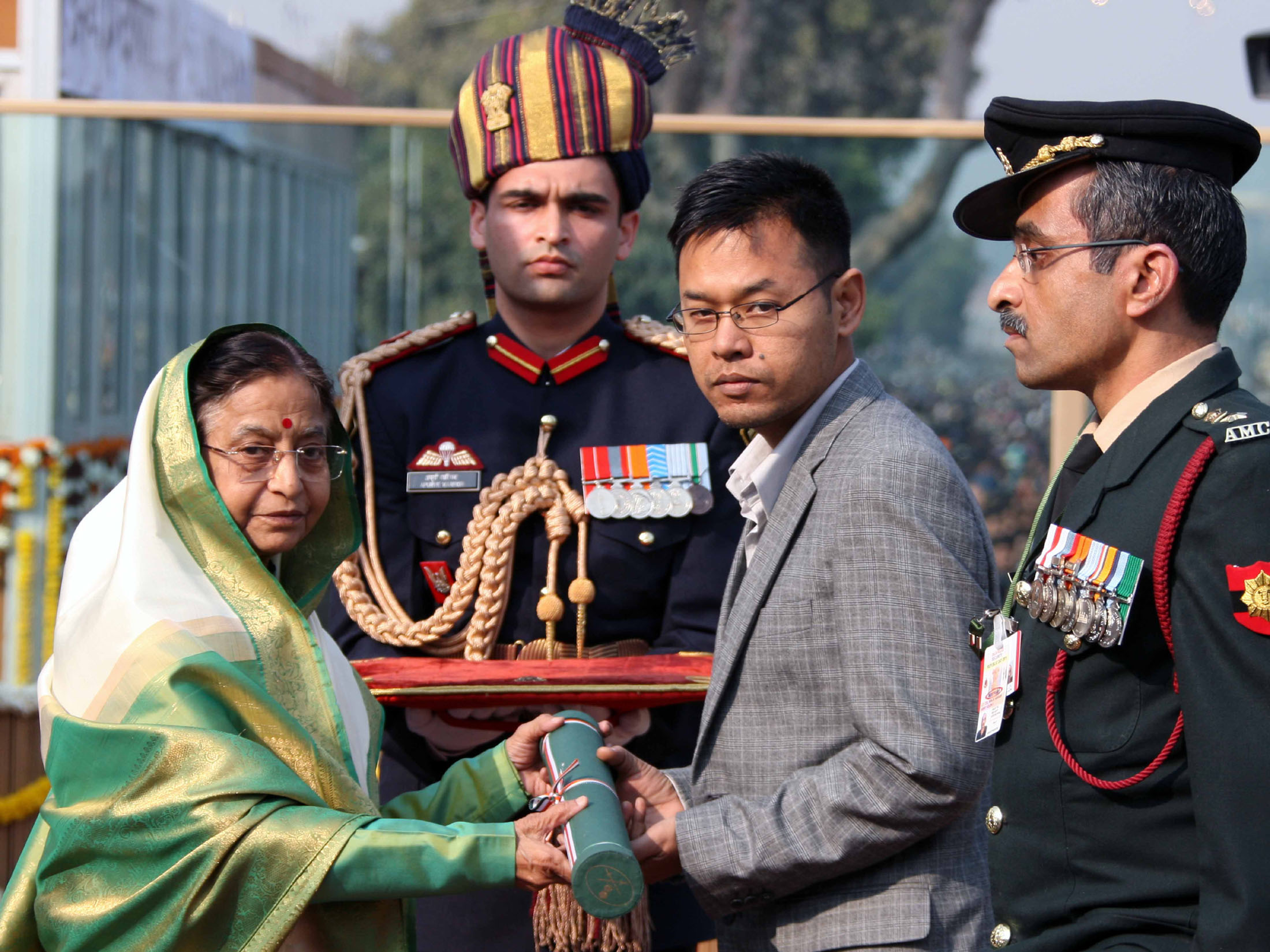
Laishram Jyotin Singh's brother receives the Ashok Chakra from president Pratibha Patil on 26 January 2011.

Singh was born in 1972 in Manipur, India, in a Hindu Meitei family. On 15 February 2003, he was commissioned a captain in the Army Medical Corps on a short-service commission. He was promoted major on 15 February 2007, and with effect from 26 April was appointed to a permanent commission with the rank of major dating from 15 February 2005.

Singh was posted with the Indian Embassy in Kabul in 2010. Just thirteen days after his posting, on 26 February 2010, a suicide bomber attacked the guarded residential compound where he was staying. Major Singh confronted the terrorist unarmed and forced him to detonate his vest, which resulted in his death. He was awarded the Ashok Chakra "For his act of exemplary courage, grit, selflessness and valour in the face of a terrorist attack, resulting in his sacrifice and saving 10 of his colleagues"
