= Command Hospital =

Type of military hospital in India

Command Hospitals are major military hospitals in India. There is not more than one in each Command. The Indian Armed Forces have seven Command Hospitals. They are:

Hospital	Command	Branch	Coordinates
Command Hospital Kolkata	Eastern Command	Indian Army	22.529709°N 88.330309°E
Command Hospital Chandimandir	Western Command	Indian Army	30.712479°N 76.854403°E
Command Hospital Udhampur	Northern Command	Indian Army	32.930616°N 75.134971°E
Command Hospital Lucknow	Central Command	Indian Army	26.817359°N 80.941464°E
Command Hospital Pune	Southern Command	Indian Army	18.495725°N 73.884416°E
Command Hospital Bengaluru	Southern Air Command	Indian Air Force	12.963901°N 77.630938°E
INHS Asvini Mumbai	Western Naval Command	Indian Navy	18.900958°N 72.815833°E

== See also ==
- List of Armed Forces Hospitals In India
