= Kalyani Sen =

Indian naval servicewoman

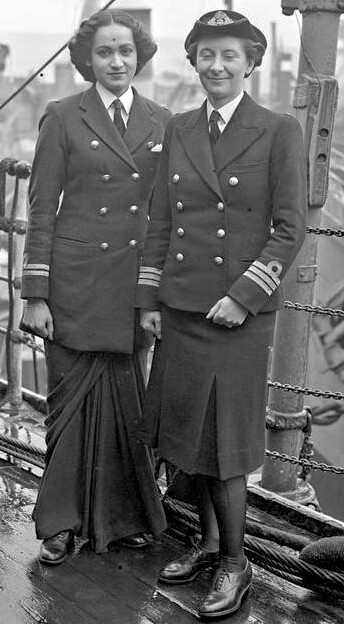
- Kalyani Sen (left) with Chief Officer Margaret I. Cooper (right), at Rosyth, 3 June 1945
- Born: Kalyani Gupta c. 1917
- Education: Kinnaird College, Lahore; Government College, Lahore; Punjab University
- Years active: 1943–1945
- Women's Auxiliary Corps (India) WAC(I)
- Allegiance: (British Raj) British India
- Branch: Women’s Royal Indian Naval Service
- Service years: 1943–1945
- Rank: Second Officer
- Known for: Debating; First Indian service woman to visit the UK
- Spouse(s): Lionel Protip Sen (m. 1939; div. 1953) Tutu Bhagat
- Children: known 2 including Mala Sen
- Father: S. N. Gupta

Kalyani Sen (born c. 1917) was Second Officer of the Women’s Royal Indian Naval Service (WRINS), a section of the Women's Auxiliary Corps (India) WAC(I). In 1945, she became the first Indian servicewoman to visit the UK.

Sen was the daughter of the principal of the Mayo Arts College, Lahore. In 1938 she gained a masters in English literature from the Punjab University before commencing studies for a masters in political science. As a student she performed in theatre and at one time played Ophelia in the play Hamlet, at a time when Indian women did not typically act on stage. Her success on stage led to her being sought out for cinema. In 1938, while a student at Punjab University, at a session of the All-India Inter-University Debate, she was announced as the best speaker after she spoke against the proposal that India should not contribute to future wars. That debate won her the gold medal and Punjab University the Sir Ashutosh Mukherjee trophy.

In 1943, during the Second World War, Sen joined the WAC(I). The following year she received the King's commission as Second Officer.

== Early life and education ==
Kalyani Sen (née Gupta), affectionately known as 'Babli', was born around 1917, the only daughter of S. N. Gupta, an artist and the principal of the Mayo Arts College, Lahore, and Mrs. Gupta, who later became a chief commander for the Women's Auxiliary Corps (India) WAC(I). Her grandfather was the journalist Nagendranath Gupta. She studied at Kinnaird College and Government College, both in Lahore. At the 13th annual exhibition of the Punjab Fine Arts Society in 1935, she was listed as one of the prize winners. At Government College, she performed in open air theatre, and played Ophelia in the play Hamlet, at a time when Indian women did not typically act on stage. Her success on stage led to her being sought out for cinema in then Calcutta.

In 1938, she gained a masters in English literature from the Punjab University before commencing studies for a masters in political science. There, she took part in debates including arguing against the notion that "sport is not in the domain of women." In the same year, at a session of the All-India Inter-University Debate, organised by the Calcutta University Law College union, she was announced as the best speaker after she spoke against the proposal "That India should be no party to future wars." That debate won her the gold medal, and resulted in the Sir Ashutosh Mukherjee trophy going to Punjab University.

== Second World War ==
In 1943, during the Second World War, Sen joined the WAC(I). (Note: Wives of Royal Indian Navy (RIN) officers were first employed in 1939, at the onset of the Second World War, with the purpose of assisting in decoding secret messages. The WAC(I) was created in 1942 and its naval section, WRINS, was formed in 1944. It corresponded with the WRNS.) The following year she received the King's commission as Second Officer. In 1945, now an officer for the Women’s Royal Indian Naval Service (WRINS), she became the first Indian service woman to visit the UK, at the age of 28. Along with Chief Officer Margaret I. Cooper and second officer Phyllis Cunningham, their purpose was to carry out a two month study of training and administration in the Women's Royal Naval Service (WRNS), by visiting WRNS establishments across Britain. They arrived in the UK on 13 April of that year and attended a press conference that same day. Sen made broadcasts from the BBC in English and Bengali, and attended a ceremony at Buckingham Palace. She reported that "In India there is still a big prejudice against girls and women working with men… but the women are so keen to get into the Services that they are breaking it down." On 3 July 1945, they left the UK to return to India. At the time, her husband was serving with the Indian Army in Burma.

== Personal life ==
During her course in political science in 1939, she married Captain (later Lieutenant-General) Lionel Protip Sen of the Baluch Regiment. Her first daughter, Radha, was born in 1941. In 1947, she gave birth to Mala. In 1953, her marriage to L. P. Sen ended in divorce. According to Farrukh Dhondy, she later married Tutu Bhagat and lived in a well-off part of Mumbai.
