= Margaret Isobel Cooper =

British naval auxiliary officer (1915–2015)

Chief Officer Margaret Isobel Cooper OBE
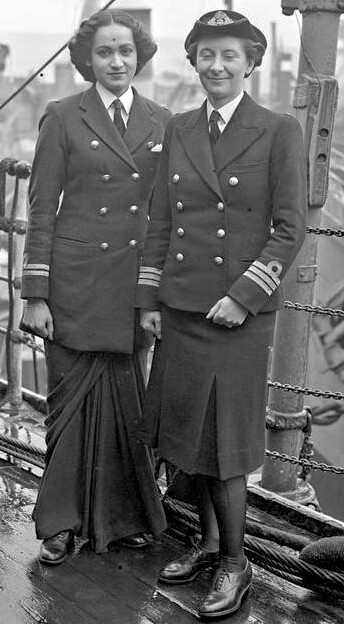
- Chief Officer Margaret I. Cooper (right) with Second Officer Kalyani Sen, at Rosyth during their two-month study visit to the UK (1945)
- Born: Margaret Isobel Perkin; 12 October 1915; Shillong, British India
- Died: 7 December 2015 (aged 100); Jávea, Spain
- Other name: Peggy Skipwith
- Military career
- Allegiance: United Kingdom; British India
- Branch: Women's Auxiliary Corps (India); Women's Royal Indian Naval Service; Royal Navy; Royal Indian Navy
- Service years: 1941–1946
- Rank: Chief Officer
- Nickname: Peggy
- Commands: Women's Royal Indian Naval Service (WRINS)
- Conflicts: Second World War
- Awards: OBE

Margaret Isobel Cooper OBE (12 October 1915 – 7 December 2015), later known as Peggy Skipwith, was a British military officer who was Chief Officer and deputy director of the Women's Royal Indian Naval Service (WRINS) during the Second World War.

Cooper was born in Shillong, British India, and sent to England at the age of five years, returning to India in 1934. In 1941, based in Quetta, she served the Women's Auxiliary Corps (India) (WAC(I). In 1943 she was appointed Lieutenant Colonel, the regional commander responsible for recruiting women in Indian naval offices. The role led to becoming the Chief Officer and Deputy Director of WRINS, appointed by Admiral John Henry Godfrey, then flag officer commanding the Royal Indian Navy (RIN). Together they planned an active campaign to recruit women from across British India for service in the RIN. She was also responsible for the welfare, training and housing of WRINS. In 1946, she returned to England and worked recruiting for MI6 until 1948.

Following the death of her second husband in 1981, she remained in Javea, Spain, and later made two return journeys to India in 2005 and 2013. She died in 2015 almost two months after her 100th birthday.

== Early life ==
Margaret Cooper (née Perkin), affectionately known as Peggy, was born in Shillong to Sir Athol Owen Perkin, Inspector-general of police at Odissa, and his wife, Lady Marion. She had three younger siblings; one brother became squadron leader No. 9 Squadron RAF, another led the 19th Punjab regiment at the Battle of Wadi Akarit, and her sister Beryl joined the Intelligence Corps. At the age of five years Cooper was sent to live with grandparents in England, where she completed her early education at Oxford High School.

Cooper returned to India in 1934, and married Lieutenant Colonel R.A.B. Cooper of the East Yorkshire Regiment who was awarded an OBE for his work during the Muzaffarpur earthquake.

== Second World War ==
In 1941, based in Quetta, Cooper served the Women's Auxiliary Corps (India) (WAC(I). In September 1943, she was appointed Lieutenant Colonel, the regional commander responsible for recruiting women in Indian naval offices. The role led to her assuming the rank of Chief Officer, and being appointed deputy director of WRINS by Admiral John Henry Godfrey, then flag officer commanding the Royal Indian Navy (RIN). Together they planned an active campaign to recruit women from across British India for service in the RIN. It proved popular with middle and upper-class Indian women and most were generally very young; just out of school or in college. Cooper wrote in 1945 that "for the Indian girls it was the experience of a life time and broadened their outlook considerably – helping towards emancipation". She explained that "as two-thirds of the women who enrolled were Indian, two styles of uniforms were developed, one consisting of a white sari with a blue border, to suit the graceful Indian girls, and, for the British and Anglo-Indians, an attractive uniform based on that of the Women's Royal Naval Service (WRNS). She contributed to the introduction of the publication Wrins and How They Served. In addition to recruitment and regulations she was responsible for the welfare, training and housing of WRINS. According to Cooper's writings, in order to do this she travelled over 55,500 miles, chiefly by air, to naval bases across India. According to Godfrey, most of those she recruited to WRINS were Indian so that by the end of 1945 "43% of the officers and 77% of the Wrins were Indian, and among the junior officers 80% were Indian".

Serving WRINS, Cooper stayed in Delhi, where she would have been among General Wavell, General Claude Auchinleck, Cecil Beaton, Peter Fleming and Ian Fleming. In April 1945, she accompanied Second Officer Kalyani Sen to the UK, where they visited A.T.S. establishments. For her wartime service she was appointed an OBE in 1946.

== Later life ==
In 1946, Cooper left the naval service and rejoined her husband in England and worked recruiting for MI6 until 1948, when she moved to Austria. In 1949, she returned to England, where she settled in Camberley, Surrey, until 1959, when she moved to Malta with her husband. In retirement, she settled in France, and then in Javea, Spain, with her second husband Lieutenant Colonel J.P. de Skipwith. Following his death in 1981 she remained in Spain, and later made two return journeys to India with her daughter Carol in 2005 and 2013. In October 2015, on her 100th birthday, Javea Golf Club, where she played golf, awarded her honorary membership and created the 'Peggy Skipwith Cup'.

== Death ==
Cooper, then Peggy Skipwith, died on 7 December 2015, almost two months after her 100th birthday, and was survived by her sister, daughter, one daughter-in-law, one grandson, and a great-grandson.
