= The Path of Zarathustra =

The Path Of Zarathustra
- Directed by: Oorvazi Irani
- Written by: Farrukh Dhondy
- Produced by: Sorab Irani, Oorvazi Irani
- Starring: Oorvazi Irani Tom Alter Rushad Rana Darius Shroff Firdausi Jussawalla Vivek Tandon
- Cinematography: Subhadeep Dey
- Music by: Vasuda Sharma
- Production company: SBI Impresario Pvt. Ltd.
- Release date: 4 September 2015 (Mumbai)
- Country: India
- Language: English

The Path Of Zarathustra is a 2015 Indian magic realism film directed by Oorvazi Irani. It stars Oorvazi Irani, Tom Alter, Rushad Rana and Shishir Sharma. The screenplay of the film is written by the author Farrukh Dhondy. The film was released on 4 September 2015.

== Plot ==
The film tells the journey of a young woman born into Zoroastrianism, the religion of her forefathers. Her journey starts with a remote village where she sees her grandfather die, to Mumbai, where she is welcomed by her aunt's adopted son who confesses that he still loves her. The film also in a unique manner brings back characters from the historical and philosophical past of Zoroastrianism such as Mani, executed by Parsi priests, Mazdak, executed for his radical communistic ideas and Zurvan, a theological avatar of 'Time'.

== Cast ==
- Oorvazi Irani
- Tom Alter
- Rushad Rana
- Darius Shroff
- Firdausi Jussawalla
- Vivek Tandon

== Production ==
The film is produced by SBI Impresario Pvt. Ltd. The company is a family held media production organization incorporated in 1975 by its current Managing Director and Chairman Sorab Irani. Oorvazi Irani his daughter as Director of the company is now along with her father carrying forward the company legacy as a filmmaker.

== See also ==
- On Wings of Fire
