= Death by Fire =

Death by Fire may refer to:

- Death by Fire (album), a 2013 album by Enforcer
- Death by Fire (book), a 2002 book by Mala Sen
