= Reskin =

Reskin may refer to:

- Barbara Reskin (born 1945), American professor of sociology
- Reskin or rebadge, to apply a different badge or trademark to an existing product (e.g. an automobile)
- Reskin, in computer game development, to apply a new skin
- Asset flip, in computer game development, when generic games are given new assets and resold at low prices

== See also ==
- Skin (disambiguation)
