= Skin (disambiguation) =

Skin is a soft outer covering of an animal, in particular a vertebrate.

Skin, skins or The Skin may also refer to:

== Outer covering ==
- Peel (fruit), or outer covering of any vegetable
- Skin (aeronautics), the outer covering of an aircraft or its wing
- Skinning, removing the outer layer of something's flesh
- Milk skin, a thin layer over the top of heated milk
- Hide (skin), an animal skin processed by humans
- Mobile phone skin, a protective and/or decorative covering for a mobile phone

== Arts and entertainment ==
=== Film ===
- The Skin (film), a 1981 Italian film by Liliana Cavani based on the novel by Curzio Malaparte
- Skin (1995 film), a British short film directed by Vincent O'Connell
- Skins (2002 film), an American drama
- Skin (2008 film), a British-South African biographical film about Sandra Laing
- Skin (2008), an award-winning Dutch film directed by Hanro Smitsman
- Skins (2017 film), a Spanish drama
- Skin (2018 feature film), an American drama by Guy Nattiv
- Skin (2018 short film), an American Oscar-winning drama by Guy Nattiv
- Skin: The Movie (2018 film), an American comedy by Ronn Kilby
- Skin (2020 film), an Iranian drama

=== Literature ===
==== Novels ====
- Skin (Andrew novel), 2021, by Kerry Andrew
- Skin (Dekker novel), 2007, by Ted Dekker
- Skin (Hayder novel), 2009, by Mo Hayder
- Skin (graphic novel), a 1992 graphic novel by Peter Milligan and Brendan McCarthy
- Skin, an X-Files novel by Ben Mezrich
- The Skin (novel), a 1949 novel by Curzio Malaparte
- Skins, a 1995 novel by Adrian C. Louis

==== Other uses in literature ====
- "Skin" (short story), a 1952 short story by Roald Dahl
- Skin and Other Stories, a 2000 story collection by Roald Dahl
- Skin: Talking About Sex, Class & Literature, a 1994 collection of essays by Dorothy Allison
- Skin (Marvel Comics), a fictional character
- Skin, a 1995 play by Naomi Iizuka

=== Music ===
==== Performers ====
- Skin (British band), a hard rock band, or their 1994 debut album
- Skin (Japanese band) or S.K.I.N, a rock supergroup
- Skin (musician) (born 1967), British singer, lead vocalist for Skunk Anansie
- The World of Skin, also known as Skin, an American band

==== Albums ====
- Skin (Ephraim Lewis album) or the title song, 1992
- Skin (16volt album) or the title song, 1994
- Skin (Endorphin album) or the title song, 1999
- Skin (Erik Friedlander album), 2000
- Skin (Flume album), 2016
  - Skin: The Remixes, 2017
- Skin (Ho99o9 album), 2022
- Skin (Joy Crookes album), 2021
- Skin (Katie Noonan album), 2007
- Skin (Melissa Etheridge album), 2001
- Skin (Peter Hammill album) or the title song, 1986
- Skin (Peter Himmelman album), 1994
- Skin (The Rainmakers album) or the title song, 1996
- Skins (Buffalo Tom album), 2011
- Skins (XXXTentacion album), 2018
- Skins! Bongo Party with Les Baxter, 1957
- Skin (EP), by Collide, 1996

==== Songs ====
- "Skin" (Breaking Benjamin song), 2003
- "Skin" (Rag'n'Bone Man song), 2017
- "Skin" (Rihanna song), 2010
- "Skin" (Sabrina Carpenter song), 2021
- "Skin" (Zach Bryan song), 2026
- "Skin (Sarabeth)", by Rascal Flatts, 2005
- "Skin", by Adema from Adema, 2001
- "Skin", by Alexz Johnson from Instant Star: Greatest Hits, 2009
- "Skin", by The Amenta from n0n, 2008
- "Skin", by Beartooth from Below, 2021
- "Skin", by Bladee from Eversince, 2016
- "Skin", by Bullet for My Valentine from Venom, 2015
- "Skin", by Club 8 from Pleasure, 2015
- "Skin", by Collective Soul from Blender, 2000
- "Skin", by Flowers from Icehouse, 1980
- "Skin", by Grimes from Visions, 2012
- "Skin", by Mac Miller from The Divine Feminine, 2016
- "Skin", by Machinae Supremacy from Overworld, 2008
- "Skin", by Madonna from Ray of Light, 1998
- "Skin", by Oingo Boingo from Dark at the End of the Tunnel, 1990
- "Skin", by R. Kelly, 2008
- "Skin", by Rae Morris from Unguarded, 2015
- "Skin", by San Cisco from Flaws, 2020
- "Skin", by Spacey Jane from Sunlight, 2020
- "Skin", by Spock's Beard from Day for Night, 1999
- "Skin", by Taemin from Phase 1: Soft Violence, 2026
- "Skin", by White Zombie from Let Sleeping Corpses Lie, 2008
- "Skin, No. 1" and "Skin, No. 2", by Julius Hemphill from Coon Bid'ness, 1975
- "Skins", by Pink Floyd from The Endless River, 2014

=== Video games ===
- Skin (video games), a player customization option for the outward appearance of a character or item

=== Television ===
- Skins (British TV series), a 2007–2013 teen drama series
  - Skins (American TV series), an adaptation that aired on MTV in 2011
- Skin (American TV series), a 2003 drama series
- Skin (British TV programme), a 1980–1982 documentary programme
- "Skin" (Almost Human), an episode
- "Skin" (Supernatural), an episode
- Skin (Emmerdale), a character
- Skins, a species of aliens in Roswell
- Skin (2019 film), a documentary on perceptions of beauty based on skin color in Africa

== Sports ==
- Skins (sportswear), a company that manufactures and sells compression sportswear
- Skins game, a type of golf and curling event
- Skins, the team that plays a sport shirtless in shirts versus skins
- Washington Commanders, formerly the Washington Redskins, sometimes shortened to Skins

== Other uses ==
- Skin (anthropology), a form of social categorisation system in Australian Indigenous societies
- Skin (computing), a customized graphical presentation for computer software and websites
- Polaris Skin, an Italian ultralight trike design

== See also ==
- Skinz (disambiguation)
- Skinning (disambiguation)
- Skinny (disambiguation)
