= Hamari Paltan =

2018 Indian Hindi-language film

- Release poster of the film
- Directed by: Jainendra Jigyasu
- Written by: Jainendra Jigyasu
- Screenplay by: Jainendra Jigyasu
- Produced by: Alakh Media
- Starring: Tom Alter; Manoj Bakshi
- Cinematography: Satender
- Edited by: Dalip Kumar
- Music by: Malti Mathur; V. Hemanandh; Anurag Singh
- Production company: Alakh Media
- Release date: 27 April 2018 (India)
- Running time: 100 min.
- Country: India
- Language: Hindi
- Box office: est. ₹4.15 lakh (US$4,900)

Hamari Paltan: The Children's Brigade for Change is a 2018 Indian Hindi-language children's film directed by Jainendra Jigyasu. The film follows a movement led by children to stop a development project from clearing a forest and displacing its inhabitants. It marked the last film appearance of veteran actor Tom Alter, whose performance was praised by critics.

== Plot ==
Master ji (Tom Alter) is a retired teacher in Sonapur. He teaches the local children principles of Gandhism and environmental conservation. Meanwhile, a businessman meets a corrupt politician (Manoj Bakshi) with a scheme to cut down the forest near Sonapur for a development project and displace all its inhabitants. Master ji starts a protest against the project and is murdered for it; the children of Sonapur and the nearby city come together to stop the project.

== Cast ==
- Tom Alter as Master ji
- Manoj Bakshi as corrupt politician

== Production ==
Hamari Paltan marked the directorial debut of Jainendra Jigyasu. A few child artists in the film were cast from the Ralli International School in Ghaziabad, Uttar Pradesh. Manoj Bakshi appeared as the corrupt politician against the children's movement.

The director stated in an interview that Alter's role was akin to that of Aamir Khan in 'Taare Zameen Par' and Shah Rukh Khan in Dear Zindagi. He called directing Alter in his debut film "an honor", adding that the actor was an "acting institute himself". Jigyasu also wrote the film, which was intended to be released in December 2017 under the banner of Alakh Media. Its first look was revealed in September 2017. The film's trailer was released in March 2018. Following the film's release on 27 April 2018, a special screening was organized at the Ralli International School in May 2018. It was promoted as the last film appearance of Tom Alter who died on 29 September 2017, although Redrum, another film featuring him was subsequently released in August 2018.

== Reception ==
In her review for The Tribune, Rashi Mathur noted that the director had "achieved his purpose of telling a poignant tale with a message". She was appreciative of Alter's acting, commenting that he "[enthralled] the audience, though for the last time". She opined that in the beginning, the film seemed like "jigsaw puzzle pieces" and "[gained] clarity" only in the second half. She called the film's music, its "distinct feature". Pallabi Dey Purkayastha of The Times of India gave the film a 1-star rating, stating the "script sounds noble" but was lacking in execution. She called Alter the film's "only saving grace" and noted that without him the "film's prospects take a swift nose dive". She found the cinematography "not up to the mark", writing "lackluster", songs "composed in a tearing hurry" and the climax "not too believable". Purkayashta concluded her review by stating that the film had the potential to leave "a lasting impression" had the filmmaker avoided mediocrity.

Ravindra Tripathi of the Hindi daily Jansatta called the film "praiseworthy" but noted that the film's rawness makes the message the film tries to convey, a little weak. He further opined that the film was a sort of "tribute" to Alter but it "would have been better had the director worked more".

According to the Indian film trade website Box Office India, the film had a limited release on 25 screens and had a worldwide gross of est. ₹4.15 lakh (US$4,900), earning the label "disaster".
