= Manoj Bakshi =

Indian Actor( Born 1965)

- Born: 13 October 1965 (age 60); New Delhi, India
- Occupation: Actor
- Years active: 1980–present

Manoj Bakshi is an Indian actor who acts in films, television and theatre. He is famous for his roles in Bajrangi Bhaijaan (2015), Delhi Belly (2011), Jab Tak Hai Jaan (2012), Gori Tere Pyaar Mein (2013), Junooniyat (2016), Madaari (2016) and Hamari Paltan (2018). He has also worked in the film Dear Vs Bear with Haryanvi actor Uttar Kumar.

== Early life ==
Bakshi is a Punjabi. He began his career as a theatre artist in 1980. He has worked in plays in Uttar Pradesh for 18 years. Bakshi has performed key roles in many plays such as Mahabhoj, Chandramukhi, Jis Lahore Nai Vekhya O Jamyai Nai, Curfew, Muawze, Til Ka Taad, Dil Ki Dukaan, Kath Ki Gadi, Baby, Yaaddasht Mubarak, Heroine No.1, Chor Nikal Ke Bhaga, Samaryatra, Is Dard Ki Dawa Kahaan and more.

== Career ==
The Pakistani policeman's role in the superhit movie Bajrangi Bhaijaan with Salman Khan brought him a new identity in the Bollywood industry. Bakshi has worked with seasoned actors like Govinda, Rishi Kapoor, Neetu Kapoor, Ranbir Kapoor and all the Khans.

He also appeared in the movie Panipat as a very controversial character, Suraj Mal. It was a short role of ruler of Bharatpur in Rajasthan, India. In the film, Maratha warrior Sadashivrao Bhau (a character played by Arjun Kapoor) asks Surajmal for help to defeat the Afghans, but he demands the Agra Fort in return. As his demand remained unfulfilled, he refused to help Sadashivrao Bhau.

== Filmography ==
Key
†	Denotes films that have not yet been released

Year	Film	Role	Notes
2000	Kya Kehna	Principal of Madhuban	
2008	Oye Lucky! Lucky Oye!	Dr. Handa associate	
2010	Do Dooni Chaar	Dada Popley	
2011	Delhi Belly	Father	
2011	Hair Is Falling		
2011	No One Killed Jessica	Lawyer	
2011	Hum Do Bhagode		
2012	Ab Hoga Dharna Unlimited	Kantelel	
2012	Hate Story		
2012	Miss Lovely	Heera	
2012	Jab Tak Hai Jaan	Mr. Kapoor	
2013	Jolly LLB	Cop Mukesh	
2013	Dreamz: The Movie	Sheikh	
2013	Kajarya	Gourav Bhatnagar - Police Inspector	
2014	Khwaabb!	Baldev SIngh	
2014	Unfreedom	Prithu	
2014	Dear Vs Bear	Anne Father	
2014	Mumbai Delhi Mumbai	Old Sardarji	
2014	The Lost Salesman of Delhi	Bhatiaa	
2014	Hum Hai Teen Khurafaati		
2015	Bajrangi Bhaijaan	Qureshi (Pakistani Police man)	
2015	Mukhtiar Chadha	Mr. Sharma	
2016	Gori Tere Pyaar Mein	Kareena Kapoor Khan's Father	
2016	Happy Bhaag Jayegi	Zia Rehmani	
2016	Junooniyat	Yash's Father	
2016	Madaari	Govind Bakshi	
2018	Hamari Paltan		
2018	When Obama Loved Osama		
2019	San 84 Justice	Janardan	
2019	Panipat	Surajmal	
2020	Doordarshan	Hindi Teacher	
2020	Kaamyaab	80s Villain	
2020	Atithi Kab Aoge Shhamshan	Mahaprabhu	
2020	Mehroom †		
2021	Ek Nashebaaz †	drug dealer in rehab	
2022	10 Nahi 40		
2022	Ramrajya †	Cercle officer	
2023	Pyar Ki Policy	Judge	
2023	Gadar 2	Yahya Khan	
