= Skinz (disambiguation) =

Skinz is the stage name of Danish singer of Somali descent Mohamed Ahmed.

Skinz may also refer to:

- "Skinz", a song from the 1992 debut album Mecca and the Soul Brother of Pete Rock & CL Smooth
- "Skinz", a track from OnlyOneOf's 2022 EP Instinct Part. 2
- Skinz, a gang in the video game Manhunt

== See also ==
- Skin (disambiguation)
