= On Wings of Fire =

- DVD cover
- Directed by: Cyrus Bharucha
- Screenplay by: Cyrus Bharucha; Adi Marzban
- Produced by: Meherji K. Madan
- Starring: Zubin Mehta; Nigel Terry; Paul Shelley
- Narrated by: Derek Jacobi
- Cinematography: Reg Pope
- Edited by: Sam Ornstein
- Production company: Persepolis Productions
- Release date: 1986 (India)
- Running time: 90 minutes
- Country: India
- Language: English

On Wings of Fire (originally titled A Quest for Zarathustra) is a 1986 English-language Indian film directed by Cyrus Bharucha and starring Zubin Mehta, Paul Shelley, Saeed Jaffrey, Amrish Puri, with Nigel Terry as Zarathustra and Derek Jacobi as the narrator. It is the first and only film to cover the philosophy and history of Zoroastrianism in a scholarly and dramatic way. The film was premiered at Mumbai's Sterling Cinema in June 1986, and was released in the United States in 2001.

== Summary ==
The film recounts the history of Zoroastrianism and prophet Zarathushtra, covering a period of 3500 years of the Zoroastrians and the Parsees of India. The story begins with the conductor Zubin Mehta, the film's pivotal figure, a westernised Parsi who visits his homeland to discover his roots, and in the process learns about the history of his people.

== Cast ==
- Zubin Mehta as himself
- Derek Jacobi as narrator
- Nigel Terry as Prophet Zarathustra
- Paul Shelley as King Vishtaspa
- Tom Alter as the Priest
- Erick Avari as the Professor
- Lewis Fiander as Tansar
- Saeed Jaffrey as Jadhav Rana, the Hindu king
- Nicholas Jones as King Gushnasp
- Oengus MacNamara as Alexander
- Amrish Puri as Nihavand ruler, the Amir
- Soni Razdan as Thais
- Khojeste Mistree as the Dasturji
- Leybourne Callaghan as John Wilson
- Crew of HMS Ambuscade as extras

== Reception ==
The film has generated controversy within the Parsi community in India. Zoroastrians today hold different opinions concerning the person of Zarathustra: some view him as an enlightened philosopher and scholar, but a mortal being; others embrace a more mystical concept that he is an incarnation of the immortal Amesha Spenta possessing supernatural abilities.

In the film, Zarathustra is portrayed as a philosopher, rather than as a divine being endowed with divine wisdom; and one scene shows Zarathustra arguing in the court of King Vistasp that death is evil, which indicates the concept of reincarnation, a principle rejected by Zarathustra which expresses belief in resurrection instead. These conflicting perceptions have generated heat in the reactions to the film: "[…] the 90-minute presentation replete with misrepresentations and gross distortions, it was a dastardly attempt to convey an unhallowed portrayal of the religion and its prophet, the rarely militant conservatives fumed."

Three high priests—Hormazdyar Mirza, Kaikhushroo Jamapasa and Feroz Kotwal—stated in the journal Parsiana: "The film, if produced in the form and manner reported in the press, will be construed as a deliberate and malicious act intended to outrage religious beliefs by insulting the religion and beliefs of the Parsi community."

== See also ==
- The Path of Zarathustra
