= Women's Royal Indian Naval Service =

Military unit in British India (1944–47)

Women’s Royal Indian Naval Service
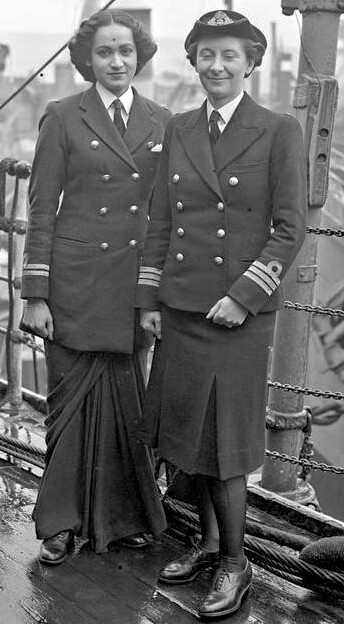
- Second Officer Kalyani Sen (left) and Chief Officer Margaret Isobel Cooper (right) at Rosyth June 1945
- Country: British India
- Allegiance: (British Raj) British India (1944–1947)
- Branch: Women's Auxiliary Corps (India); Royal Indian Navy; Royal Navy
- Nickname: WRINS
- Engagements: Second World War

The Women’s Royal Indian Naval Service (WRINS) was the naval section of the Women's Auxiliary Corps (India) (WAC(I)). It was established during the Second World War as a branch of the Royal Indian Navy.

== Origin ==
The induction of women in the Royal Indian Navy (RIN) began with the wives of RIN officers in service in the port city of Bombay (now Mumbai), before extending to other Indian ports. They were first employed in 1939, at the onset of the Second World War, with the purpose of assisting in decoding secret messages. The Women's Auxiliary Corps (India) (WAC(I)) was created in 1942. The WAC(I) were first employed in the RIN in June 1943 at Bombay, following a call for a more organised women's service of the RIN earlier that year. In September 1943 Lieutenant Colonel Margaret Isobel Cooper became regional commander responsible for recruiting women in Indian naval offices. The appointment of six cypher officers and 239 auxiliaries proved a success and thereafter all Indian ports began to employ WAC(I) members. 78 officers and 713 auxiliaries were employed by November 1943. By early 1944 the WAC(I) Naval Wing, Women's Royal Indian Naval Service (WRINS), was created and Admiral John Henry Godfrey, then flag officer commanding the RIN, appointed Cooper as its Chief Officer and Deputy Director.

== Recruitment ==
WRINS had its own distinct uniform. It corresponded with the Women's Royal Naval Service (WRNS). Signals auxiliaries were trained at HMIS Talwar and along with officers, were housed in hostels at Bombay, Chittagong, Cochin, and Vishakhapatnam. In 1945, recruitment reached target and direct employment of officers mostly ceased. According to Godfrey, most of those recruited to WRINS were Indian so that by the end of 1945 "43% of the officers and 77% of the Wrins were Indian, and among the junior officers 80% were Indian".

== Visit to the UK ==
Cooper and Second Officer Kalyani Sen visited the UK between April and July 1945, when they visited A.T.S. establishments and learnt the WRNS ways of training and administration.

== Gallery ==
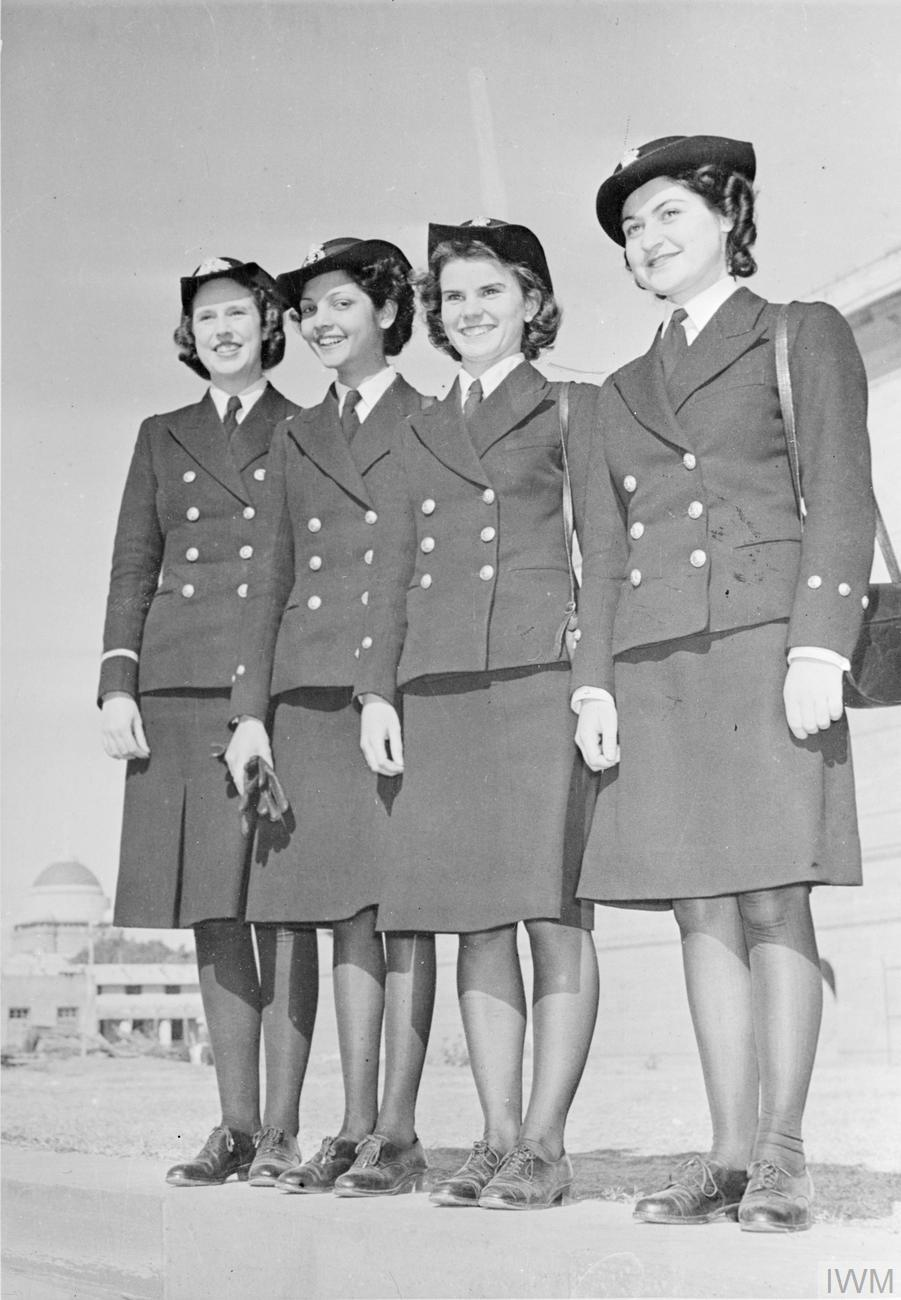
WRINS, 1945. Moina Imam second from left.

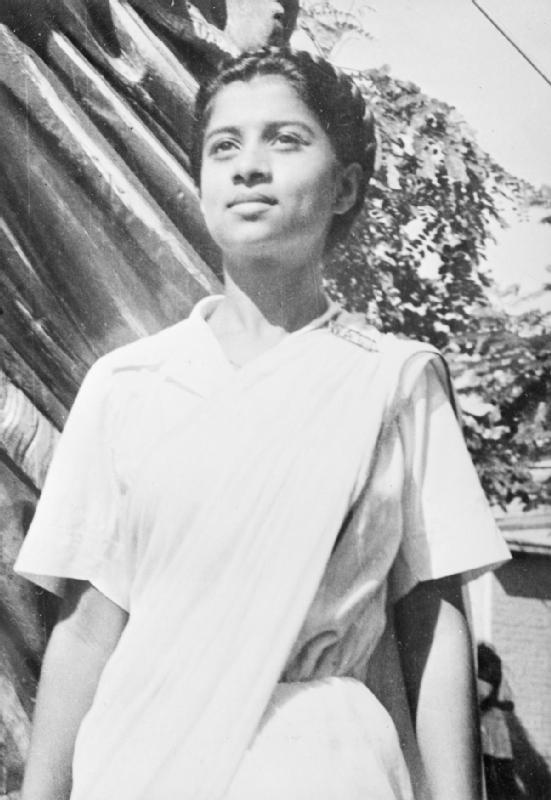
WRINS in sari

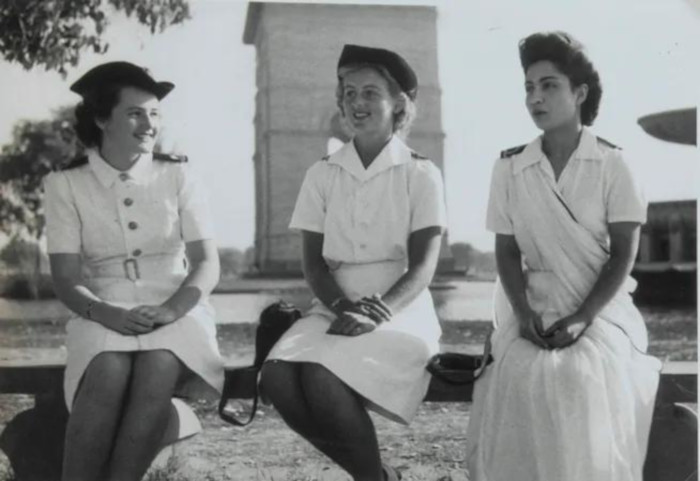
WRINS: Two types of uniform

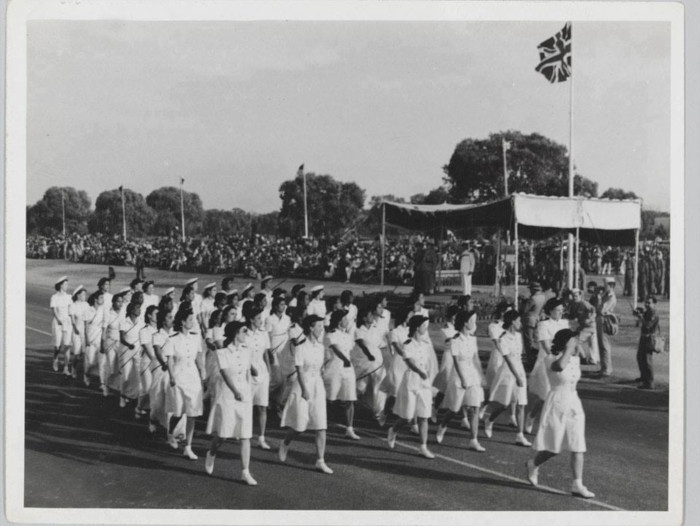
WRINS at allied victory celebrations in Delhi, India. 4–9 March 1946
