= Mala Sen =

Indian-British writer and human rights activist 1947–2011)

- Born: 3 June 1947; Mussoorie, United Provinces, British India
- Died: 21 May 2011 (aged 63); Mumbai, Maharashtra, India
- Other name: Mala Dhondy
- Education: Welham Girls' School
- Occupations: Writer, human rights activist
- Notable work: India's Bandit Queen: The True Story of Phoolan Devi (1991); Death by Fire: Sati, Dowry Death and Female Infanticide in Modern India (2002)
- Spouses: Farrukh Dhondy (m. 1968; div. 1976)
- Parent(s): Lt-Gen Lionel Proteep Sen (father); Kalyani Sen (mother)

Mala Sen (3 June 1947 – 21 May 2011) was a Bengali-Indian-British writer and human rights activist. As an activist, she was known for her civil rights activism and race relations work in London during the 1960s and 1970s, as part of the British Asian and British Black Panthers movements, and later her women's rights activism in India. As a writer, she was known for her book India's Bandit Queen: The True Story of Phoolan Devi, which led to the acclaimed 1994 film Bandit Queen. After researching the oppression of women in rural India, Sen also published Death by Fire in 2002.

== Biography ==
=== Early years ===
Born on 3 June 1947 in Mussoorie in Uttarakhand, Mala Sen was the daughter of Lt-Gen Lionel Proteep Sen and Kalyani Gupta. Following her parents' divorce in 1953, she was brought up by her father. Sen was of Bengali heritage. After attending Welham Girls' School in Dehradun, she studied home sciences at Nirmala Niketan College in Mumbai. She gained a place at Pune University, where she met Farrukh Dhondy. In 1965 she eloped to England with Dhondy, who had won a scholarship to Cambridge University. They married in 1968 and divorced in 1976, although they continued to maintain a friendly relationship.

=== Activism in London ===
After arriving in England, Sen began working as a seamstress to help to pay the bills. Increasingly taking an interest in race relations, she fought for the rights of Indian factory workers in Leicester. Writing in the journal Race Today, she reported on how Bangladeshis in the East End of London worked in sweatshops while living in dormitories where beds were shared around the clock by shiftworkers. Separated from their Indian families, they did not qualify for housing accommodation as they were listed as single. Together with her husband and other activists, Sen founded the Bengali Housing Action Group, which led to the establishment of Brick Lane as a safe living area for the Bangladeshi community in East London.

Along with Dhondy, Sen was also an active member of the British Black Panthers movement. She was an early member of the Race Today Collective. Her writing is included in Here to Stay, Here to Fight – A Race Today Anthology (Pluto Press, 2019, ISBN 9780745339757), edited by Paul Field, Robin Bunce, Leila Hassan and Margaret Peacock, which features contributions to the journal between 1973 and 1988.

=== Research and writing ===
As a result of her effective involvement, Sen was invited to research television documentaries. While in India, she became particularly interested in press reports about a lower-caste, poverty-stricken woman called Phoolan Devi who had suffered forced marriage at 11, gang rape and kidnapping. Seeking revenge as she grew older, Devi sought justice for rape victims while supporting the poor by stealing from the rich. When 24, she was charged with the murder of high-caste Thakur men who had been involved in gang rape. In 1983, she negotiated her surrender, serving a prison sentence of 11 years. Sen visited Devi in prison, where she succeeded in persuading Devi to dictate her story to fellow prisoners as she was unable to write herself. Her book India's Bandit Queen, based on Sen's research over a period of eight years, was subsequently published in London (Harvill Press, 1991; edited by Margaret Busby).

In the early 1990s, Sen was invited by Channel 4 television, where Dhondy was now a commissioning editor, to draft the screenplay for a feature film based on her book about Devi. Directed by Shekhar Kapur, 1994's Bandit Queen became one of India's most critically acclaimed films ever. But it led to considerable controversy when, after its première in Cannes, the activist Arundhati Roy, supported by Sen, called for court action to ban its release in India in view of the gang rape scene, which invaded Devi's sexual privacy. After receiving a settlement of £40,000, Devi withdrew her objections and the film was released for Indian audiences. Devi became an Indian member of parliament in 1999 but was shot dead two years later.

While investigating the background to Devi's life, Sen researched the general victimisation of women in rural India, where they frequently undergo such pressures that they consider themselves worthless. As a result, she published her second book, Death by Fire: Sati, Dowry Death and Female Infanticide in Modern India in 2001. Adopting a semi-autobiographical fictional style, she tells the story of three women, an 18-year-old woman who is burnt alive on her husband's funeral pyre, another woman is set on fire by her husband, and a third is sentenced to life imprisonment for allegedly killing her infant daughter. These examples are presented to show the differences in law enforcement for the rich and poor which have led to the creation of women's groups to work towards improvements in justice.

=== Death ===
Mala Sen died, aged 63, on 21 May 2011 at the Tata Memorial Hospital in Mumbai, after undergoing an operation for oesophageal cancer, which had been diagnosed earlier that year; at the time she had been working on a new book about women with HIV in India. A memorial event for her was held in London at the Nehru Centre in July 2011.

== Bibliography ==
- India's Bandit Queen: The True Story of Phoolan Devi, London: Harvill Press, 1991.
- Death by Fire: Sati, Dowry Death and Female Infanticide in Modern India, London: Rutgers University Press, 2002.

== Popular culture and legacy ==
Bandit Queen, a highly acclaimed 1994 Indian film, is based on Sen's book India's Bandit Queen: The True Story of Phoolan Devi.

Guerrilla, a 2017 British drama mini-series based on the British Black Panthers, features a female lead inspired by Sen, Jas Mitra, who is played by Freida Pinto.

Mala Sen is depicted in a mural on Brick Lane by artist Jasmin Kaur Sehra, part of a series commissioned in 2018 by the Tate Collective to celebrate the contributions of the "overlooked".

A portrait of Mala Sen by photographer Paul Trevor was purchased in 2021 by the National Portrait Gallery, London, for its permanent collection.
