= Lionel Protip Sen =

Indian Army general

Lieutenant-General Lionel Protip Sen DSO
- Born: 20 October 1910; Calcutta, Bengal Presidency, British India (now Kolkata, West Bengal, India)
- Died: 17 September 1981 (aged 70)
- Spouse: Kalyani Gupta (m. 1939; div. 1953)
- Relatives: Mala Sen (daughter)
- Military career
- Allegiance: British India (1931–1947); India (1947–1965)
- Branch: British Indian Army; Indian Army
- Service years: 1931–1965
- Rank: Lieutenant-General
- Nickname: Bogey
- Service number: AI-77
- Units: 16/10 Baluch Regiment; 8th Gorkha Rifles
- Commands: GOC-in-C, Southern Command; GOC-in-C, Eastern Command; 161st Indian Infantry Brigade
- Conflicts: World War II; Burma campaign; Battle of Hill 170; Indo-Pakistan War of 1947; Sino-Indian War
- Awards: Distinguished Service Order; Mentioned in dispatches
- Other work: authored Slender was the Thread

Lieutenant-General Lionel Protip "Bogey" Sen, DSO (20 October 1910 – 17 September 1981) was a decorated Indian Army general. He served as the Chief of the General Staff during 1959–1961 and commanded the Eastern Command during 1961–1963. He was the general responsible for countering the Chinese invasion of NEFA during the Sino-Indian War of 1962. Sen is also the author of Slender was the Thread, a military history of the Indo-Pakistani War of 1947–1948.

== Career ==
=== Early career ===
A King's Commissioned Indian Officer (KCIO), Sen attended the Royal Military Academy Sandhurst and was commissioned a second lieutenant in the British Indian Army on 27 August 1931. As was customary, he was attached to a battalion of a regular British Army regiment, the 1st battalion of the Cheshire Regiment, for a period of one year prior to his official appointment to the Indian Army. He was formally appointed to the Indian Army as an officer with the 10th Baluch Regiment on 26 October 1932 (seniority from 29 January 1931). He was promoted lieutenant on 29 April 1933, and to captain on 29 January 1939.

=== Second world war ===
During the Second World War, Sen fought in the Burma Campaign with the 16th Battalion of 10 Baluch. In early 1945, his battalion took a prominent role in the Battle of Hill 170, during which he was awarded the Distinguished Service Order (DSO). The citation recommending Sen for the DSO (which was not published) noted:

...In spite of the greatest difficulties Lt-Col Sen held firmly on to his precarious positions, and the final success of the whole operation was in no small measure due to his dashing assault and tenacious defence. Throughout, he has proved himself a gallant leader of a gallant Battalion and an inspiration to every officer and man under his command.

=== Post-Independence ===
As the Baluch Regiment, Sen's parent regiment, was among those regiments allotted to Pakistan following Indian independence, Sen transferred to the 8th Gorkha Rifles.

During the Indo-Pakistani War of 1947–1948, he was promoted to acting brigadier and commanded the 161st Indian Infantry Brigade, and ordered to take over the defence of Srinagar and the Kashmir Valley, for which he received a mention in dispatches.

On 23 December 1949, he became Colonel of the 1st Gorkha Rifles (The Malaun Regiment).

On 16 March 1955, Sen was promoted acting major-general and appointed Director of Military Training (DMT). He was appointed Master-General of the Ordnance (MGO) on 8 May 1957, and was further appointed Colonel-Commandant of the Army Physical Training Corps on 26 September.

Sen was promoted to acting lieutenant-general on 1 August 1958, and to the substantive rank on 29 January 1959. On 8 May 1961, he was appointed GOC-in-C, Eastern Command, in which capacity he served during the Sino-Indian War the following year. After the conflict, Sen was appointed GOC-in-C, Southern Command, on 10 May 1963. He retired from this posting on 8 May 1965, after nearly 34 years of service.

== Personal life ==
In 1939, he married Kalyani Gupta. Their first daughter, Radha, was born in 1941, and Mala in 1947. The marriage ended in divorce in 1953.

Sen died in 1981.

== Awards and decorations ==

General Service Medal 1947		Indian Independence Medal	
Distinguished Service Order	1939–1945 Star	Burma Star	War Medal 1939–1945

== Dates of rank ==
Insignia	Rank	Component	Date of rank
	Second Lieutenant	British Indian Army	27 August 1931 (seniority from 29 January 1931)
	Lieutenant	British Indian Army	29 April 1933
	Captain	British Indian Army	29 January 1939
	Major	British Indian Army	25 August 1940 (acting); 25 November 1940 (temporary); 1 July 1946 (substantive)
	Lieutenant-Colonel	British Indian Army	22 November 1944 (acting)
	Major	Indian Army	15 August 1947 (Note: Upon independence in 1947, India became a Dominion within the British Commonwealth of Nations. As a result, the rank insignia of the British Army, incorporating the Tudor Crown and four-pointed Bath Star ("pip"), was retained, as George VI remained Commander-in-Chief of the Indian Armed Forces. After 26 January 1950, when India became a republic, the President of India became Commander-in-Chief, and the Ashoka Lion replaced the crown, with a five-pointed star being substituted for the "pip.")
	Lieutenant-Colonel	Indian Army	1947 (temporary)
	Brigadier	Indian Army	1947 (acting)
	Colonel	Indian Army	1947 (temporary); 1 January 1950 (substantive, with seniority from 29 January 1949)
	Colonel	Indian Army	26 January 1950 (recommissioning and change in insignia)
	Brigadier	Indian Army	29 January 1952 (substantive)
	Major General	Indian Army	16 March 1955 (acting); 29 January 1956 (substantive)
	Lieutenant-General	Indian Army	1 August 1958 (acting); 29 January 1959 (substantive)

== Notes ==
Military offices
Preceded by Joyanto Nath Chaudhuri	General Officer Commanding-in-Chief Southern Command; 1963–1965	Succeeded by Moti Sagar
Preceded by S. P. P. Thorat	General Officer Commanding-in-Chief Eastern Command; 1961–1963	Succeeded by Paramasiva Prabhakar Kumaramangalam
Preceded by S. D. Verma	Chief of the General Staff; February 1959–8 May 1961	Succeeded by Brij Mohan Kaul
