= Yahan Ke Hum Sikandar =

Indian drama television series

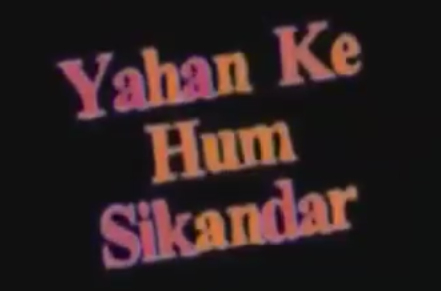
- Genre: Teen drama
- Created by: Dilip Sood
- Screenplay by: Taqi Imam; Harish Vyas
- Story by: Taqi Imam; Harish Vyas
- Directed by: Dilip Sood
- Creative director: Shivani Thakur
- Starring: Tom Alter; Saksham Dayma; Anu Nain; Dhruv Raj Sharma; Punit Kumar; Tanvi Chaturvedi
- Theme music composer: Gulraj Singh
- Opening theme: "Yahan Ke Hum Sikandar" by Manoj Yadav
- Country of origin: India
- Original language: Hindi
- No. of seasons: 2
- No. of episodes: 175

Production
- Executive producer: Mayank Jain
- Producer: Dilip Sood
- Production location: Bijnor
- Cinematography: Suhas Rao
- Editors: Vivek Gupta; Vikas Malik
- Running time: ~25 min
- Production company: Dilip Sood Films

Original release
- Network: DD National
- Release: 6 October 2011 – 25 July 2013

Yahan Ke Hum Sikandar is an Indian Hindi language teen drama television series which aired on DD National from 2011 to 2013. The show stars assembled cast of Tom Alter, Saksham Dayma, Anu Nain, Dhruv Raj Sharma, Tanvi Chaturvedi, Ritu Chauhan and Puneet Kumar. The show was created, directed and produced by Dilip Sood for Doordarshan. The story and dialogues were written by Taqi Imam and Harish Vyas. Following success of the first season, the show returned with the second season.

== Plot ==
Season 1

Five students studying in the Government school in Bijnor, Uttar Pradesh, India; have their aspirations and dreams. Samuel (Tom Alter), a British who did not leave India after independence, teaches History to students in school and helps students as their guide. Ali (Saksham Dayma) helps his father in his metal welding shop due to financial condition of his family. He studies in school and wants to excel in boxing. Aisha (Anu Nain), a girl from middle-class family, wants to make her career in Badminton. Radhey (Dhruv Raj Sharma) is her happy-go-lucky friend. He likes Suhani (Tanvi Chaturvedi), an upper-class girl studying in Sunshine Public School, an English medium school; and follows her frequently. Sameer (Punit Kumar) is simple and smiling friend and schoolmate of Ali, Aisha and Radhey. Ranjana (Ritu Chauhan), a free spirited girl is also friends with and secretly admires Ali. Karan, a classmate of Suhani, is their antagonist who turns their friend in end. The series shows these small town children's life and conflict with society and culture to achieve their dreams.

Season 2

They complete their schooling and go to college. Their struggles and joys continue. Ashima and Ranjna join them.

== Cast ==
- Tom Alter as Samuel
- Saksham Dayma as Ali
- Anu Nain as Aisha
- Dhruv Raj Sharma as Radhey
- Punit Kumar as Sameer
- Tanvi Chaturvedi as Suhani
- Nitin Sharma as Karan
- Ritu Chauhan as Ranjana

== Broadcast ==
The show was broadcast on DD National, two episodes per week. The first season ended with 110 episodes. The second season ended on 25 July 2013 with 65 episodes.
