= Oorvazi Irani =

Indian film director

- Education: Jai Hind College, Mumbai University,
- Occupations: filmmaker, educationalist, acting coach, film critic
- Father: Sorab Irani

Oorvazi Irani is an independent filmmaker based in Mumbai, India. Apart from being a filmmaker, she is a film educationalist, an acting coach, and a film critic and the Director of her home production company SBI Impresario Pvt. Ltd incorporated by her father Sorab Irani in 1975. Currently, she has directed The Path of Zarathustra a movie on Parsis. She has also directed two short films “The K File” and “Mamaiji” (Grandmother). As a film educationalist she heads the subject of film at the SVKM J.V. Parekh International school in Mumbai, India besides teaching as a freelance educationalist at various prestigious film institutions on special invitation. She has also recently introduced the Michael Chekhov Acting technique to India with her DVD which she has researched, presented, directed and co-produced.

== Early life ==
She did her graduation in Arts from the Jai Hind College, Mumbai. After that she pursued the FTII & NFAI Film Appreciation Course designed for teacher's training as well as the Online Teacher's IB Film Course. During her term in college she started assisting her father on a travelogue series “Ramayana a Journey” that he was producing for Channel Four Television, London. The concept behind this film was following the route that Lord Rama had taken during his journey from Ayodhya to Lanka. Oorvazi became the head of research for this project and also assisted in direction. It took 3 years in making and was completed in 1997.

== Career ==
Oorvazi started her career as the Director of her home media production company SBI Impresario Pvt. Ltd. incorporated by her father in 1975. She has been involved with international critically acclaimed film projects with her company in the area of research, production and direction.

Apart from running the home production company, Oorvazi also took up the role of a film educationalist. She currently heads the subject of film at the ‘SVKM J.V.Parekh International School’. Besides this, she also has conducted Film Appreciation modules at various prestigious institutions including The Mumbai University Post Graduate One Year Diploma Course for Film and Television, The Digital Academy Film School Mumbai, Kishore Namit Kapoor Acting Institute, The Institute of Creative Excellence – ICE, the Education division of Balaji Telefilm and ‘Understanding Cinema’ module of the BMM syllabus at The Ghanshyamdas Saraf Girls College, Mumbai (Affiliated to the University of Mumbai).

=== Michael Chekhov Acting Technique ===
Oorvazi's association with acting and actors as an artist made her curious to understand the process of acting. She started researching on this topic extensively and came across the revolutionary Michael Chekhov Acting Technique. The Michael Chekhov technique was developed by Mikhail Aleksandrovich Chekhov, also known as Michael Chekhov, who as a student of Stanislavski furthered his technique of method acting and molded it into an exercise to get to the core of a character. Chekhov trained Hollywood actors like Marilyn Monroe, Anthony Quinn, Clint Eastwood, Mala Powers, Yul Brynner. Apart from his direct students, other actors have also benefited from his technique described in his book, 'On the Technique of Acting'. Significant among them are actors like Johnny Depp and Anthony Hopkins, who have cited this book as a major influence on their acting. Oorvazi was the pioneer in bringing this Michael Chekhov acting technique to India. As an acting coach, she taught this technique to her students. She has recently come out with a DVD titled ‘The Michael Chekhov Acting Technique’. The DVD is a step by step Guide to understanding the Basic Tools and Fundamental Concepts of the Michael Chekhov Acting technique. The President of the Chekhov Association, USA, Joanna Merlin, endorsed the DVD by stating:

"In Oorvazi Irani's sensitive presentation of the Michael Chekhov Acting Technique, she guides the actor through Chekhov's psycho-physical process with, grace, elegance, intelligence and joyfulness. Oorvazi is an articulate actor and teacher, profoundly moved and motivated by Chekhov's lifelong study of the art of acting. In this formidable and artistic presentation, Oorvazi provides a progressive journey for actors, inspiring them to explore their untapped imaginative resources, deepening and enriching their creative individuality."

Filmmaker Ashutosh Gowarikar, after watching this DVD, gave the following feedback to Oorvazi:

"It is superbly done. There is a lot of intrigue in this method, the way you have described it. :) I feel you might need some fierce marketing for its awareness to spread. Very well packaged tutorial on the Chekhov technique ! Wish you all the success with it !"

Recently Oorvazi has conducted a special seminar cum workshop for the Russian Culture Centre on the Michael Chekhov Acting Technique where her DVD was also screened. She has also conducted special acting modules of the Acting technique on special invitation for reputed organizations like Thespo14 @ Prithvi (which is the most popular youth theater group based in Mumbai), Kishore Namit Kapoor Acting Institute(which is the acting school for big stars like Hritik Roshan, Kareena Kapoor, Priyanka Chopra etc.), and a special module for non-actors at the popular indie film community platform www.madaboutmovies.com . This is besides the regular courses that she conducts as a freelance independent acting coach for the technique, for amateurs and professionals.

After completion of her father's project, ‘Ramayana a Journey’, she also got involved in another one of his projects, a documentary called ‘Lord Ganesha – The Elephant Head God’. This film traced the origins of Lord Ganesha, the mythological stories associated with him as well as captured the essence of the Ganesh Chaturthi festival in Mumbai. Oorvazi acted as an associate director in this project.

Oorvazi has also been a freelance photo editor in 2004 for Life Positive Magazine and in 2006 the CEO for the south Mumbai branch of the Kishore Namit Kapoor Acting institute.

As the Director of SBI Impresario she has been the project consultant for the art show ‘Unity in Diversity: Artists from Auroville’ at the Cymroza Art Gallery in September 2007.

=== Mamaiji ===
In 2011 she researched, scripted and directed her first independent short film "Mamaiji" (Parsis in India refer to their maternal grandmother as Mamaiji). The film is as much about an archetypical grandmother as it is about the personal story of Moti (Morvarid) Nadirshah Roowalla, the director's Mamaiji(grandmother), who was born in Iran in 1927, and now lives in India. The film is a portrait of a grandmother sans a realistic treatment, rather the film's time and space is suspended in an artistic realm beyond the real and the unreal and therein lies its charm.

This film has had private screenings in some prestigious film institutes like FTII and NFAI in Poona as well as certain private viewings. It was received warmly by viewers and film enthusiasts. Veteran filmmaker Govind Nihalani, after watching this film, remarked:

"I loved her film on her grandmother. Very beautiful and poetic. She seems to be headed in the right direction"

=== The K File ===
In early 2012, author and screenwriter Farrukh Dhondy came to Sorab Irani, his close friend with a very interesting script. It was a quasi-realistic take on the judgement of Ajmal Kasab, the lone surviving terrorist of 26/11 Mumbai attacks and presented an alternate ending to Kasab's fate (it may be recalled that the decision of Kasab's hanging was pending at that time). Sorab immediately recognized the potency of the script and wanted his daughter Oorvazi to direct the film. On receiving the script, Oorvazi's response was:

"Initially I was a bit hesitant about approaching such a political and socially charged subject, since I am not a very politically inclined person myself. However, on reading the script multiple times, the genius of the writer, the depth of what this film could say, struck me. The great thing about this story was that it was not limited to the 26/11 attacks or the Kasab dilemma. This aspect excited me as an artist, because it gave me a scope to explore greater questions, reflections on terrorism and the contemporary times. That is something that really made me want to make the film."

That was how 'The K File' happened. The 10 min short film dealing with the Kasab paradox created quite a stir. It was released on YouTube in May, 2012 and became an instant success. ‘The K File’ has been viewed online by millions of people. Priyanka Dasgupta of ‘The Times of India’ came out with an article titled, ‘Kasab is now Asab’, in which she praised the film and declared that it was now ‘A talking point in cyberland’ She has also been an integral part of research and writing for the international textbook on Indian cinema “From Aan to Lagaan and Beyond” published in 2012.

=== Filmography ===
Year	Film	Role	Notes
1995-96-97	Ramayana a Journey	Associate director	Oorvazi was also the head researcher for this project, Produced by SBI Impresario
1997-98	Lord Ganesha – The Elephant Head God	Associate director	Documentary on Lord Ganesha and the Ganesh Chaturthi festival in Mumbai directed by Oorvazi's father Sorab Irani, Produced by SBI Impresario for Netherlands Television
2011	Mamaiji	Director, writer	Surrealist documentary on Oorvazi's maternal grandmother, Produced by SBI Impresario
2011	The Michael Chekhov Acting Technique	Director, writer, actor	Presentation of Chekhov Acting technique. Released on DVD, Produced by SBI Impresario
2012	The K File	Director	Released on YouTube in May, 2012. Scripted by Farrukh Dhondy, Produced by SBI Impresario
