= Life Flows On =

- Film poster
- Directed by: Vishaal Nityanand
- Written by: Vishaal Nityanand
- Produced by: Vikas Batra; Vishaal Nityanand; Sanjeev Sroha
- Starring: Tom Alter Dr. Satyabrat Rout; Allegra Dunn; Astri Ghosh; Ganjendra Verma; Sudarshan Juyal; Vishaal Nityanand; Shweta Bhatt Michael Dieter
- Cinematography: Jatinder Sharma
- Edited by: B. Lenin
- Music by: Pete Wildman
- Production company: Vishaal Nityanand Films
- Distributed by: Carnival Cinemas
- Release date: 21 October 2016 (India)
- Running time: 106 minutes
- Country: India
- Language: English

Life Flows On (Crematorium) is a 2016 Indian English-language drama film directed by Vishaal Nityanand. The film has Indian and European cast and crew, produced by Vishaal Nityanand Films, Vikas Batra and Sanjeev Saroha. It's a film dedicated to Global Dementia Challenge and Elderly care, deals with the lives of three dementia patients. The film had its world premiere at ‘Jagran Film Festival’ on 1 October ( International Day of Older Persons ) 2016. It has been released in India on 21 October 2016, with Carnival Cinemas.

== Cast ==
- Tom Alter as Tom
- Dr. Satyabrat Rout as Dr. Arora
- Allegra Dunn as Emma
- Astri Ghosh as Catherine
- Ganjendra Verma as Wandering man
- Sudarshan Juyal –Col. Thapa
- Vishaal Nityanand as Ajay
- Shweta Bhatt as Ragini
- Michael Dieter as David

== Music ==
Life Flows On: Original Motion Picture Soundtrack

Soundtrack album by Pete Wildman
- Released: July 2016
- Length: 14:56
- Language: English
- Label: Times Music

The songs were composed by Pete Wildman, Alok Malasi. The album received a positive response from critics.

Life Flows On (Original Motion Picture Soundtrack)
No.	Title	Lyrics	Singer(s)	Length
1.	"Re Ma"	Vishaal Nityanand	Alok Malasi	04:57
2.	"Life Flows On (Male)"	Vishaal Nityanand, Surmeet Kaur	Pte Wild Man	04:18
3.	"Life Flows On (Female)"	Vishaal Nityanand, Surmeet Kaur	Bethany Okie	04:14
4.	"Don't Know"	Vishaal Nityanand, Surmeet Kaur	Bethany Okie	01:27
Total length:				14.56

== Reception ==
Life flows on received critical acclaim from the media [ Urban Asian | date = 21 September 2016, The Hindu | date = 22 October 2016, Garhwal Post | date = 21 September 2015, Nav Hind Times | date = 14 October 2017, News Nation | date = 16 October 2016 and community [ Organisations and community working on Alzheimer's/Dementia, Alzheimer's Speak Radio (Lori ) | date =5 August 2017, Patient Engage | date= 28 April 2017 ] concerned with Global Dementia Challenge, without any publicity. Jugneeta Sudan (The Navhind Times) wrote:" the film evocatively portrays the psychological and emotional journey of Emma (Allegra Dunn) whose mother (Astri Ghosh) is progressively degenerating, with the onset of Alzheimer's disease".

Recently | date 12 September 2017, Oslo Norway film has started its international tour from Bollywood film Festival.

== See also ==
- International Day of Older Persons
