= Skinning (disambiguation) =

Skinning is the act of skin removal, usually from a dead animal.

Skinning may also refer to:

- Skinning (film), a 2010 Serbian film
- The process of applying a computer skin that changes the look, feel, and navigation interface of application software
- In skeletal animation, defining an influence that bones have over the mesh
- Uphill skiing using ski skins

== See also ==
- Skin (disambiguation)
