= 10 Nahi 40 =

- Directed by: J.S. Randhawa
- Written by: J.S. Randhawa
- Produced by: J.S. Randhawa
- Starring: Manmauji, Birbal, Manoj Bakshi, J. S. Randhawa, Rajendra Bhatia
- Cinematography: Satyajeet
- Music by: Vipul Kapoor
- Release date: 11 March 2022
- Country: India
- Language: Hindi

10 Nahi 40 (transl. 10 not 40) is a 2022 Indian film starring Birbal, Manmauji, J.S. Randhawa, Ramesh Goyal, Rajendra Bhatia, and Manoj Bakshi. The film is written and directed by J.S. Randhawa.

== Summary ==
This educational film aims to send a message to society about the importance of understanding and caring for the elderly. It highlights their insecurities and fears as they approach the twilight of their lives. The story is set in a residential society where both old and young people live together.

== Reception ==
News18 rated the film 3 star our 5.

== Cast ==
- Birbal as Birbal
- Manmauji as Manmauji
- J.S. Randhawa as Sumit
- Ramesh Goyal
- Rajendra Bhatia
- Sonal Mudgal
- Manoj Bakshi
- Sinha Mridul Gupta
- Mahesh Gehlot
- Radha
- Aashi Singh
- Ranjan Singh
- Ronny Rakhi
- Anand Agarwal
- Rakhi Anand
- Prerna
- Rahul Gautam
