= Samarendranath Gupta =

Indian artist

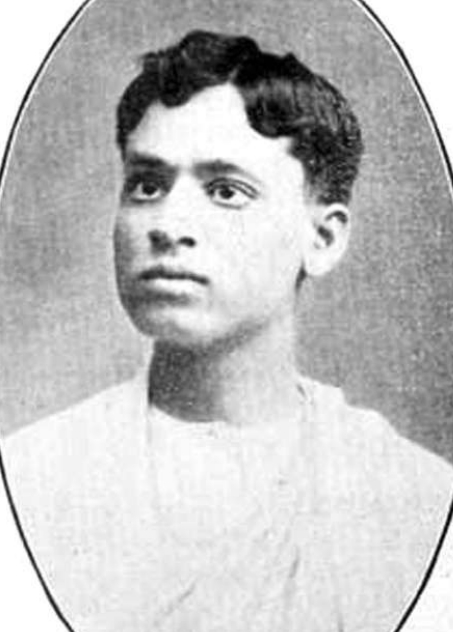
- Gupta in 1913
- Born: 1887
- Died: 1964 (aged 76–77)
- Children: Kalyani Sen

Samarendranath Gupta (1887–1964) was an Indian artist and the principal of the Mayo School of Arts, Lahore, British India. He was one of the first batch of students of Abanindranath Tagore.

== Selected publications ==
- "The place of art in Indian history". Modern Review. 15 (4): 459–462. April 1914.

== See also ==
- Amrita Sher-Gil
- Kalyani Sen
