= Tom Alter =

American–Indian actor (1950–2017)

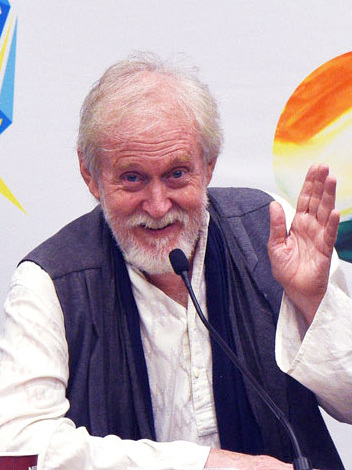
- Alter in 2016
- Born: Thomas Beach Alter; 22 June 1950; Mussoorie, Uttar Pradesh (now Uttarakhand), India
- Died: 29 September 2017 (aged 67); Mumbai, Maharashtra, India
- Occupation: Actor
- Years active: 1975–2017
- Spouse: Carol Evans (m. 1977)
- Children: 2
- Relatives: Martha Chen (sister); Stephen Alter (first cousin)

Thomas Beach Alter (22 June 1950 – 29 September 2017) was an Indian actor of American descent who worked in Indian cinema. He was best known for his works in Hindi cinema, and Indian theatre. In 2008, he was awarded the Padma Shri by the Government of India.

== Early life ==
Born in Mussoorie in present-day Uttarakhand, Alter was the son of American Presbyterian missionaries of English, Scottish and Swiss German ancestry and lived for years in Mumbai and the Himalayan hill station of Landour. His grandparents migrated to Madras, India from Ohio, U.S., in November 1916. From there, they moved to and settled in Lahore, in present-day Pakistan. His father was born in Sialkot. After the Partition of India, Alter's family split into two; his grandparents chose to stay in Pakistan while his parents moved to India. After living in Allahabad, Jabalpur and Saharanpur, in 1954 they finally settled in Rajpur, Uttarakhand, then a small town located between Dehradun and Mussoorie; Rajpur is now considered a suburb of Dehradun. Alter's siblings are older sister Martha Chen, who teaches at Harvard University and brother John, a poet. Author Stephen Alter is a first cousin.

As a child, Alter studied Hindi among other subjects in Mussoorie's Woodstock School. At 18, Alter left for the U.S. for higher education and studied at Yale University for a year before returning to India upon losing interest in studies. The following year, he obtained work as a teacher at St. Thomas School, Jagadhri, in Haryana. He worked there for six months, simultaneously coaching his students in cricket. Over the next two and a half years, Alter worked several jobs, teaching for a while at Woodstock School, Mussoorie, and working at a hospital in the U.S., and returning to India before continuing to work at Jagadhri. At Jagadhri, he began to watch Hindi films. It was during this time that he saw the Hindi film Aradhana, which proved to be a turning point in his career and drifted towards a career in acting, inspired by the lead actor Rajesh Khanna. He headed to Film and Television Institute of India (FTII) in Pune, where he studied acting from 1972 to 1974 under Roshan Taneja.

== Career ==
=== Film ===
After graduating from FTII, Alter headed straight to Mumbai (formerly known as Bombay) and soon got his first break in the Dev Anand starrer Saheb Bahadur (1977), directed by Chetan Anand. However, his first release was Ramanand Sagar's Charas. This was followed by roles in Des Pardes, Ram Bharose, Hum Kisise Kum Nahin and Parvarish. He dubbed for actor Jeevan for the innocent person of the twin roles played by Jeevan in the film Amar Akbar Anthony.

Alter was fluent in Hindi and Urdu, and was knowledgeable about Indian culture. He could also read Urdu and was fond of Shayari. He worked for noted filmmakers like Satyajit Ray in Shatranj Ke Khilari and is remembered for his role as a British officer in Kranti. He got the opportunity to act with his idol Rajesh Khanna in the film Naukri, directed by Hrishikesh Mukherjee in 1978 and later in Chetan Anand's Kudrat. In Sardar, the 1993 film biography of Indian leader Sardar Patel, which focused on the events surrounding the partition and independence of India, Alter portrayed Lord Mountbatten of Burma. He also acted in the Hollywood movie One Night with the King with Peter O'Toole.

In 1996 he appeared in the Assamese film Adajya, and in 2007 acted in William Dalrymple's City of Djinns alongside Zohra Sehgal and Manish Joshi Bismil. He also appeared in the solo play Maulana and the film Ocean of An Old Man.

Alter played the role of a doctor in Bheja Fry, a comedy movie starring Rajat Kapoor.

In April 2011 he acted in a short film Yours, Maria directed by Chirag Vadgama, playing the lead role of Matthew Chacha in the movie.

Alter lent his voice for the authorized audio autobiography of Dr. Verghese Kurien, titled The Man Who Made The Elephant Dance, which was released in 2012.

Some of his most famous movie roles have been as Musa in Vidhu Vinod Chopra's acclaimed crime drama Parinda, Mahesh Bhatt's blockbuster romance Aashiqui, and Ketan Mehta's Sardar, in which Alter essayed the role of Lord Mountbatten.

His last film was Hamari Paltan (2018).

=== Television ===
Alter appeared in many Indian television series, including Samvidhaan. In Zabaan Sambhalke he played the role of a British writer, Charles Spencers, who lives in India and wants to learn the Hindi language. He acted in the TV series Khamosh Sa Afsana (as a Husain Baba), telecast on Doordarshan in 2014–15. In November 2014, he played Sahir Ludhianvi in a stage production based on the life and work of the famous Urdu poet and film lyricist. He also played a schoolteacher in Yahan Ke Hum Sikandar. Alter has worked as the red robe guru in Mukesh Khanna's TV production Shaktimaan (1998–2002). Also, he appeared in Contiloe & Cinevistaas show Ssshhhh...Koi Hai in 2002–03. He played Indian characters in Indian television series, such as the long-running Junoon, in which he was the sadistic mob lord Keshav Kalsi. He anchored "Adabi Cocktail" in 2000 telecast on Urdu Television Network and interviewed Johny Walker, Naushad, TunTun, Hasan Kamaal, Adnan Sami, Jagdeep, Naqsh layalpuri and many more.

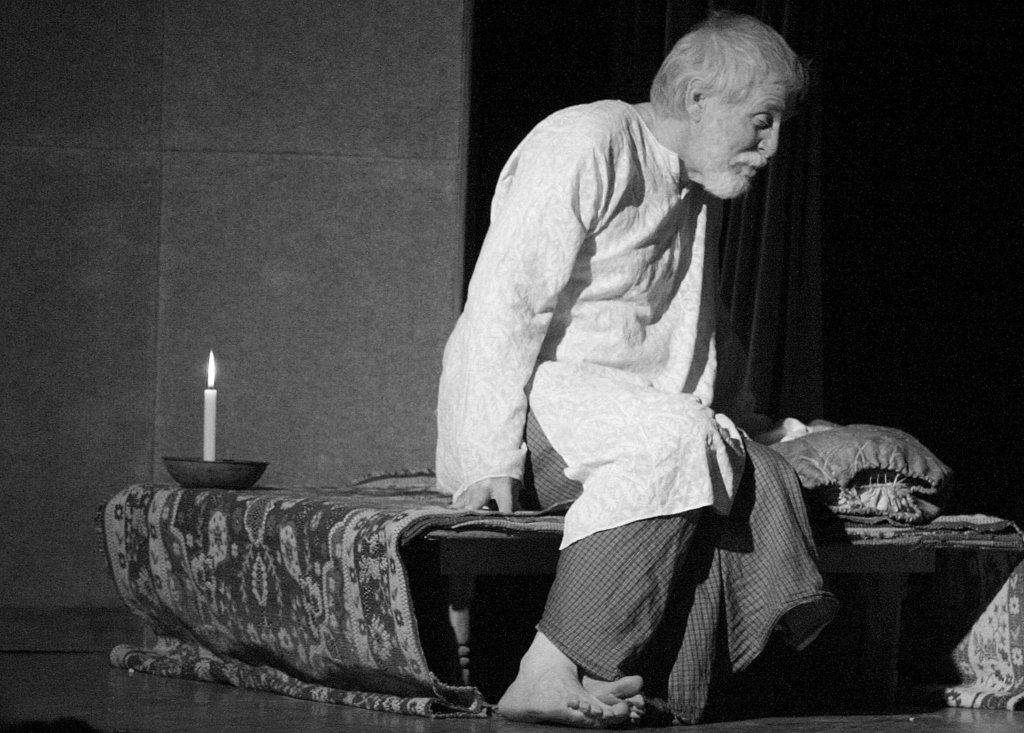
Tom Alter as Zafar

=== Theatre ===
In 1978, he, Naseeruddin Shah, and Benjamin Gilani formed a theatre group called Motley Productions. Their first play was Samuel Beckett's play Waiting for Godot, which was staged at Prithvi Theatre, Bombay, on 29 July 1979. He went on to appear in many other plays at the theatre, including an adaptation of Vaikom Muhammad Basheer's My Grandad Had an Elephant which was performed on 7 June 2011. He has also worked with the New Delhi theatre group Pierrot's Troupe.

In the early 2000s, he played the Indian independence activist Maulana Azad in a one-man Urdu-language play.

In Ghalib In Delhi, he played the role of Urdu poet Mirza Ghalib.

He was the lead actor in "Once Upon A Time", a collection of five short stories presented as vignettes, directed by Sujata Soni Bali and co-starring prominent stage actor and TV personality Sunit Tandon. The production was last staged in Mumbai on 17 June 2017.

=== Writing and journalism ===
Alter has written books including The Longest Race, Rerun at Rialto, and The Best in the World. He was also a sports journalist with a special interest in cricket, a game on which he has written extensively in publications such as Sportsweek, Outlook, Cricket Talk, Sunday Observer, Firstpost, Citizen, and Debonair. Alter was the first to video interview Indian cricketer Sachin Tendulkar in 1988.

Alter played cricket for a film industry team MCC (Match Cut Club), which includes Naseeruddin Shah, Satish Shah, Vishal Bhardwaj, Aamir Khan, Nana Patekar, Bhupinder Singh and Amarinder Sangha.

In 1996, he was invited by friend Siraj Syed to Singapore, to do cricket commentary in Hindi, for Indian viewers, on the sports TV channel, ESPN.

== Personal life ==
Alter married Carol Evans, a fellow Woodstock School student, in 1977. They had two children together.

== Death ==
In September 2017, Alter was diagnosed with stage IV skin cancer (squamous cell carcinoma). His thumb had been amputated a year earlier because of the condition. He died on 29 September at his residence in Mumbai.

== Filmography ==
=== Film ===
Year	Title	Role	Notes
1975	Mrig Trishna	Colonel Lawrence	
1976	Charas	Chief Custom Officer	
1976	Laila Majnu		
1977	Shatranj Ke Khilari	Capt. Weston	
1977	Hum Kisise Kum Naheen	Jack	
1977	Parvarish	Mr. Jackson, Supremo's 2nd in Command	
1977	Saheb Bahadur		
1977	Ram Bharose	Tom	
1977	Kanneshwara Rama	British Superintendent of police	Kannada film
1977	Chani		Marathi film
1978	Atyachaar		
1978	Naukri	Mr. Anderson	
1978	Des Pardes	Inspector Martin	
1978	Kaala Aadmi		
1979	Chamelee Memsaab		
1979	Junoon	Priest	
1979	Hum Tere Aashiq Hain	British Police Commissioner	
1979	Salaam Memsaab	John	
1980	Bharat Ki Santan		
1980	Constans		
1981	Kranti	British Officer	
1981	Kudrat	Major Thomas Walters	
1982	Meri Kahani		
1982	Brij Bhoomi	Guest	Brajbhasha film
1982	Gandhi	Doctor at Aga Khan Palace	English film
1982	Vidhaata	David	
1982	Swami Dada	Bob Simpson	
1982	Jaanwar		
1983	The Last Tiger		
1983	Nastik	Mr. John	
1983	Arpan	Tom	
1983	Jaani Dost	Cobra's Goon	
1983	Romance	Priest	
1983	Gulami Ki Zaanjeerein		
1984	Sharara		
1984	Bad Aur Badnam	President of ringania	Uncredited
1985	Ram Teri Ganga Maili	Karam Singh (Ganga's Brother)	
1985	Bond 303	Tom	
1986	Manav Hatya		
1986	Shart	Alter	
1986	Amma	British Officer	
1986	Sultanat	Shah	
1986	Karma	Rexson	
1986	Chambal Ka Badshah		
1986	Avinash	Tom	
1986	Palay Khan		
1986	Car Thief	John	
1986	On Wings of Fire	Priest	English film
1987	Mr. X		
1987	Jalwa	Voice of wrestler	
1987	Woh Din Aayega	Somnath	
1988	Etwa		
1988	Commando	Hatcher	
1988	Rukhsat	New York Police Capt. Morri	
1988	Khoon Bhari Maang	Plastic Surgeon	Cameo appearance
1988	Janam Janam	DFO	
1988	Sone Pe Suhaaga	Dr. Rex	
1988	Ore Thooval Pakshikal		
1989	Shagun		
1989	Vardi	Tom	
1989	Salim Langde Pe Mat Ro	Johan - (Jani Hippi)	
1989	Daata	Pat	
1989	Tridev	Dunhill	
1989	Bye Bye Blues	Gilbert Wilson	
1989	Parinda	Musa	
1989	Swarn Trisha		
1990	Aashiqui	Arnie Campbell	
1990	Doodh Ka Karz	Frank	
1990	Zimmedaaar	Mercus	
1990	Atishbaz		
1991	Farishtay	Guest Appearance	
1991	Deshwasi		
1991	Pahari Kanya	Doctor	Assamese language film
1991	Jab Pyar Kiya to Darna Kya		
1992	Suryavanshi	Tom	
1992	Tahalka	Dong's army captain	
1992	Angaar	Public prosecutor	Uncredited
1992	Junoon	Harry	
1993	Kala Coat	Alexander	
1993	Gumrah	Insp. Phillip	
1994	Sardar	Lord Mountbatten	
1994	Insaniyat	British Intelligence	
1994	Gajamukta		
1994	Ekka Raja Rani	Mr. Rai	Uncredited
1995	Jai Vikraanta		
1995	Oh Darling! Yeh Hai India!	Bidder	
1995	Milan	Father Demello	
1996	Kala Pani		
1996	Adajya	Mark Sahib	Uncredited; Assamese language film
1997	Divine Lovers	Dr. Taubman	
1998	Hanuman	Tom's Father	
1999	Kabhi Paas Kabhi Fail		
2000	Driving Miss Palmen	Georg Baselitz	
2000	Shaheed Uddham Singh: alias Ram Mohammad Singh Azad	Brig. Gen. Reginald Edward Harry Dyer	
2000	Champion	Doctor	
2001	Veer Savarkar	David Barry	
2001	On Wings of Fire		
2002	What Happened Then... !!!	Allen McGirvan	
2002	Dil Vil Pyar Vyar	Special Appearance	
2002	Bharat Bhagya Vidhata	Mohammed Jalaudin Ghaznavi	
2003	Love at Times Square	Mr. Gery	
2003	Dhund: The Fog	Uncle Tom	
2003	A.O.D.	Sanjeev Sarkar	
2003	Hawayein	Stephen	
2003	Yeh Hai Chakkad Bakkad Bumbe Bo		
2004	Aetbaar	Dr. Freddie	
2004	Asambhav	Brian	
2004	Veer-Zaara	Doctor Yusuf	
2004	Silence Please... The Dressing Room	Cricket coach Ivan Rodrigues	English film
2004	Mitter Pyare Nu Haal Mureedan Da Kehna	Ghosht Khan	
2004	Ghar Grihasti	Drug smuggler	
2004	Loknayak	Abul Kalam Azad	
2005	Subash Chandra Bose	Governor Jackson	
2005	Viruddh... Family Comes First	Anderson (British Consultate)	
2005	The Rising: Ballad of Mangal Pandey	Watson	
2005	The Hangman	Father Mathew	
2006	Hot Money		
2006	Alag: He Is Different.... He Is Alone....	Dr. Richard Dyer	
2006	One Night with the King	King Saul (prologue)	English film
2007	Foto		
2007	I M IN LOVE	Church father	
2007	Bheja Fry	Dr. Shepherd	
2007	Kailashey Kelenkari	Sol Silverstein	Bengali film
2008	Ocean of an Old Man	Thomas - Teacher	English film
2008	Colours of Passion Rang Rasiya	Justice Richards	
2009	Avatar	Additional Na'vi people	British-Australian-American film
2010	Muigwithania	Major David	English film
2010	Jaanleva	Mr. Malhotra	
2011	With Love, Delhi!	Ajay	
2011	Yours Maria	Matthew Chacha	Short film
2011	Cycle Kick	Football Coach	
2011	Son of Flower	Major James Edwards	English film
2011	With Love, Delhi!	Historian (Kidnapper)	English film
2012	Jhansi Ki Rani Laxmibai		
2012	Cheekha	Adeyapartha Rajan	
2012	Life Ki Toh Lag Gayi	Chicha	
2012	Kevi Rite Jaish	Uncle Sam / Derek Thomas	Gujarati film
2012	Son of Flower	Major James Edwards	
2012	Jaanleva Black Blood		
2013	Divana-e-Ishq		
2013	The Corner Table	George Miller	English short film
2014	Daptar - The School Bag	Magic Uncle	Marathi film
2014	Myth of Kleopatra	Adeyapartha Rajan	Hindi / English film
2014	M Cream	Mr. Bhardawaj	English / Hindi film
2014	Bhaangarh		
2015	Bachpan Ek Dhokha		
2015	Honour Killing	Mr. Smith	
2015	Promise Dad	Raul	
2015	Bangistan	The Imam	
2015	The Path of Zarathustra	Mamwaji	
2016	Anuragakarikkinvellam	Abhi's Boss	Malayalam film
2016	Life Flows On	Tom	English film
2017	Sargoshiyan	Alan Alter	
2017	2016 The End		
2018	Redrum	Eric Fernandez	Posthumously
2018	The Black Cat		English film; Posthumously
2018	San' 75 Pachattar		Marathi film; Posthumously
2018	Hamari Paltan	Masterji	Posthumously
2018	Nanak Shah Fakir		Posthumously
2019	KITAAB Short film	John	Film film

=== TV series ===
Period	Name	Role	Notes
1986	Idhar Udhar	Ronny Gonsalves	Episodic appearances
1988	Bharat Ek Khoj	Multiple characters	
1990–1991	The Sword of Tipu Sultan	Richard Wellesley, 1st Marquess Wellesley	
1993–1997	Zabaan Sambhalke	Charles Spencers	
1994	The Great Maratha	Robert Clive	
1993–1998	Junoon	Keshav Kalsi	
1995–2001	Aahat		Season 1 Episode 212 and 213
1997–1998	Betaal Pachisi	Harry	
1998–1999	Captain Vyom	Vishwapramukh	
1998–2005	Shaktimaan	Mahaguru	
2000	Adabi Cocktail		
2002–2003	Ssshhhh...Koi Hai	Swami Antaryami, Mritunjay	
2003–2004	Hatim	King of Paristan	Hindi, Urdu, Tamil languages
2011	Shama	Shama's Dadajaan	
2011–2013	Yahan Ke Hum Sikandar	Samuel	
2014	Samvidhaan	Abul Kalam Azad	
2014	Dard Ka Rishta	Dindyal Sharma	
2014–2015	Khamosh Sa Afsana	Hussain Baba	
2017	Rishton Ka Chakravyuh	Somdev Guruji	
2018	Wilderness Days	Anchor	
2018	Smoke	Moshe Barak	
