= Ramrajya (2022 film) =

- Directed by: Nitesh Rai
- Screenplay by: Mohana Prasad
- Story by: Shivanand Sinha
- Dialogue by: Shivanand Sinha
- Produced by: Prabir Sinha
- Starring: Aman Preet Singh; Shobita Rana; Sandeep Bhojak; Govind Namdev; Rajesh Sharma (actor); Salman Shaikh
- Cinematography: K.M. Sujith
- Edited by: Nitesh Rai
- Music by: Asif Chandwani
- Production company: Li Helios Films
- Release date: 4 November 2022
- Country: India
- Language: Hindi

Ramrajya (transl. The reign of Lord Rama) is a Hindi political drama film produced under the banner of Li Helios films. Actress Rakul Preet Singh's brother, Aman Preet, made his Bollywood debut with this movie. Punjabi actress Shobita Rana also doing her debut with Ramrajya. The renowned actor Govind Namdev can be seen as playing Aman's Guru. The songs are sung by famous singer Kailash Kher, Raja Hasan and Gul Saxena (famous RadhaKrishn serial fame).

== Production ==
Produced by Prabir Sinha, directed and edited by Nitesh Rai, story by Shivanad Sinha and screenplay and dialogue by Mohana Prasad. The film has been shot in Mumbai, Varanasi, Bokaro and Ranchi.

== Synopsis ==
Ramrajya is a political drama that revolves around enhancing and modifying the social obstacles. The fil work towards eliminating the corruption, communal violence, health, education etc. It describes the ideal state of the society where people live together in peace and harmony without the fear and aggression while following their own religion, beliefs and philosophy.

== Cast ==
- Aman Preet Singh as Lucky
- Shobhita Rana as Sapna
- Sandeep Bhojak as Nirbhaya
- Salman Shaikh as Abrar
- Rajesh Sharma as M P Shukla
- Govind Namdeo as Lucky's Guruji
- Manoj Bakshi as Cercle officer
- Mukhtar Dekhani as MP Shukla's brother
- Mushtaq Khan as MP Shukla's PA
- Meena Pulli as Lucky's mother
- Chandrashekhar as Lucky's father
- Shashwat Pratik as Lucky (18 years old)
- Baby Rash Rai as Lucky (3 years)

== Reception ==
FilmInformation was critical of the film and wrote "On the whole, Ramrajya will go unnoticed" while The Times of India wrote that the film was "not worth a cinema ticket".
