= Moina Imam =

Indian in Women's Auxiliary Corps (India), WWII

- Born: 9 April 1924; Bihar
- Died: 7 March 1988 (aged 63); Hammond, Illinois
- Military career
- Allegiance: (British Raj) British India (1945)
- Branch: Women's Royal Indian Naval Service of the Women's Auxiliary Corps
- Known for: Indian face of the Women's Auxiliary Corps W.A.C.

Moina Lillian Imam, later Moina Furlong (9 April 1924 - 7 March 1988), was chief petty officer from Bihar and was among the first Indian girls to join the Indian Women's Auxiliary Corps (WAC(I)), where she became its poster girl. She died on 7 March 1988 in Hammond, Illinois.

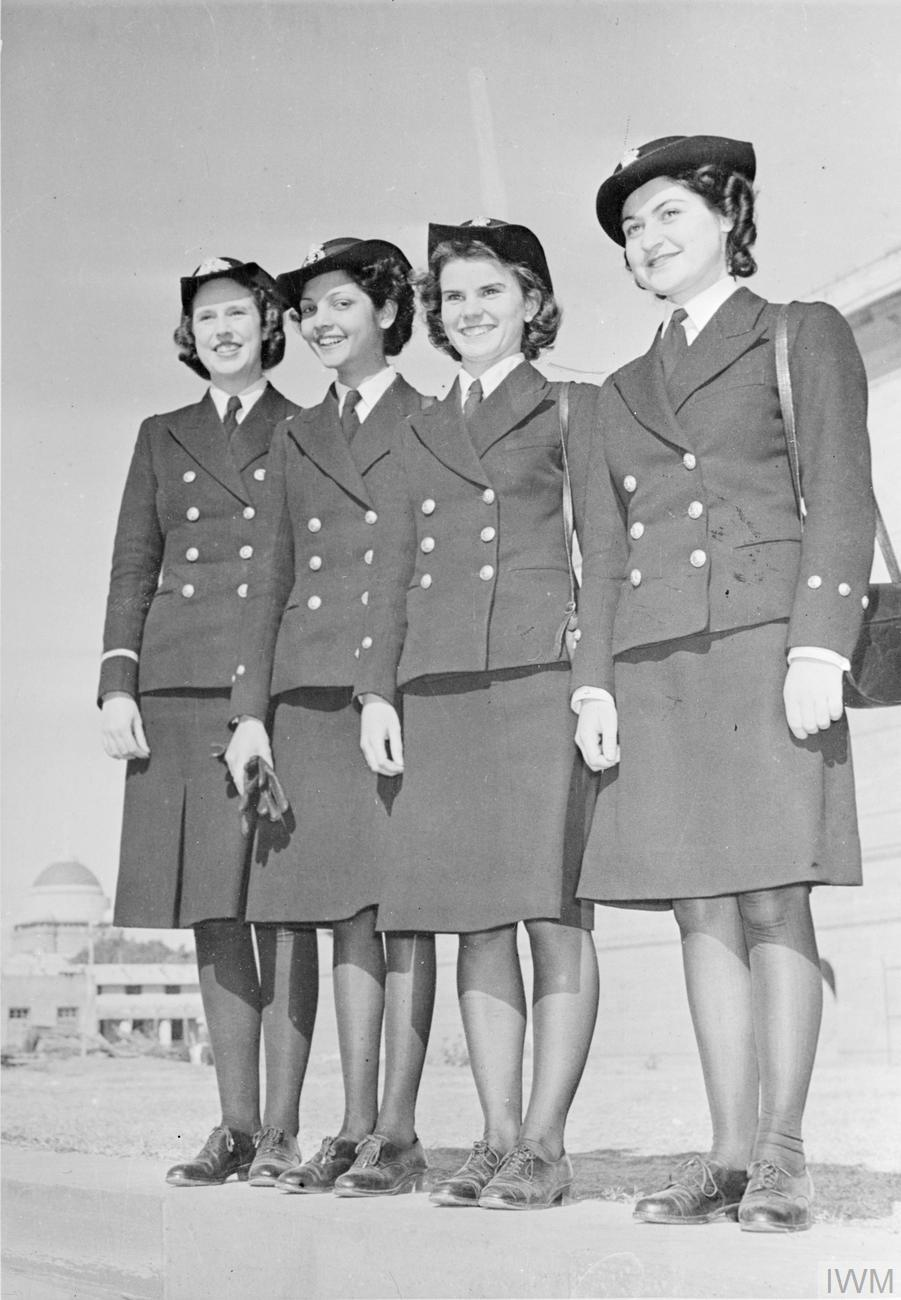
Commonwealth Forces in India, Imam is second from left
