= Skin (British TV programme) =

British television documentary programme

- Genre: Documentary
- Country of origin: United Kingdom
- Original language: English

Production
- Running time: 30 minutes
- Production company: LWT

Original release
- Network: ITV
- Release: 1980 – 1982

Skin is a British television documentary programme, aimed at a British African-Caribbean and British Asian audience, that was first broadcast from 1980 to 1982. The half-hour programme was produced by London Weekend Television (LWT), and aired weekly on LWT in a Sunday lunchtime slot.

Skin was the first production of LWT's London Minorities Unit (LMU). It introduced the current affairs magazine format later continued by programmes like Black on Black (1982), Ebony (1982), Bandung File and Black Bag (1991).
