= Bandung File =

UK current affairs television programme

- Genre: Documentary and current affairs
- Presented by: Darcus Howe, Gita Sahgal and John Buckley
- Country of origin: United Kingdom
- Original language: English
- No. of episodes: 92

Production
- Executive producers: Greg Lanning, David Cohen, Roger Thomas
- Editor: Darcus Howe. Tariq Ali
- Running time: 60 minutes

Original release
- Network: Channel 4
- Release: 12 September 1985 – 13 August 1991

Bandung File was a UK series of documentary and current affairs television programmes that aired on Channel 4 between 12 September 1985 and 13 August 1991, made by Bandung Productions with Darcus Howe and Tariq Ali as joint series editors. Presenters of the show were Howe, Gita Sahgal and John Buckley. Bandung File featured topics from an Afro-Asian perspective and with particular relevance to the UK's ethnic minorities.

== Background ==
Bandung File was commissioned by Farrukh Dhondy in his role as Commissioning Editor for Multicultural Programming from 1984 to 1997. The programme's name derived from the 1955 Bandung Conference held in Indonesia, the first large-scale meeting between newly independent Asian and African states.

Bandung File featured news and investigative documentaries from the Third World and the black and Asian populations of Britain, with an Afro-Asian perspective and of particular relevance for Britain's ethnic minorities.

Tariq Ali has said: "The whole thing about Bandung File is that we did it in a way which unified the West Indian and South Asian communities, while looking outwardly as well; 50% of the viewers were white and 50% non-white, our philosophy was that white people also needed to be educated."
