= Death by Fire (book) =

2002 book by Mala Sen

Death by Fire: Sati, Dowry Death and Female Infanticide in Modern India
- Author: Mala Sen
- Language: English
- Publisher: Rutgers University Press
- Publication date: 2002
- ISBN: 0-8135-3081-4

Death by Fire: Sati, Dowry Death and Female Infanticide in Modern India is a book authored by Mala Sen, and published by Rutgers University Press in 2002. It begins with the story of Roop Kanwar.
