= Farrukh Dhondy =

Indian-born British writer (born 1944)

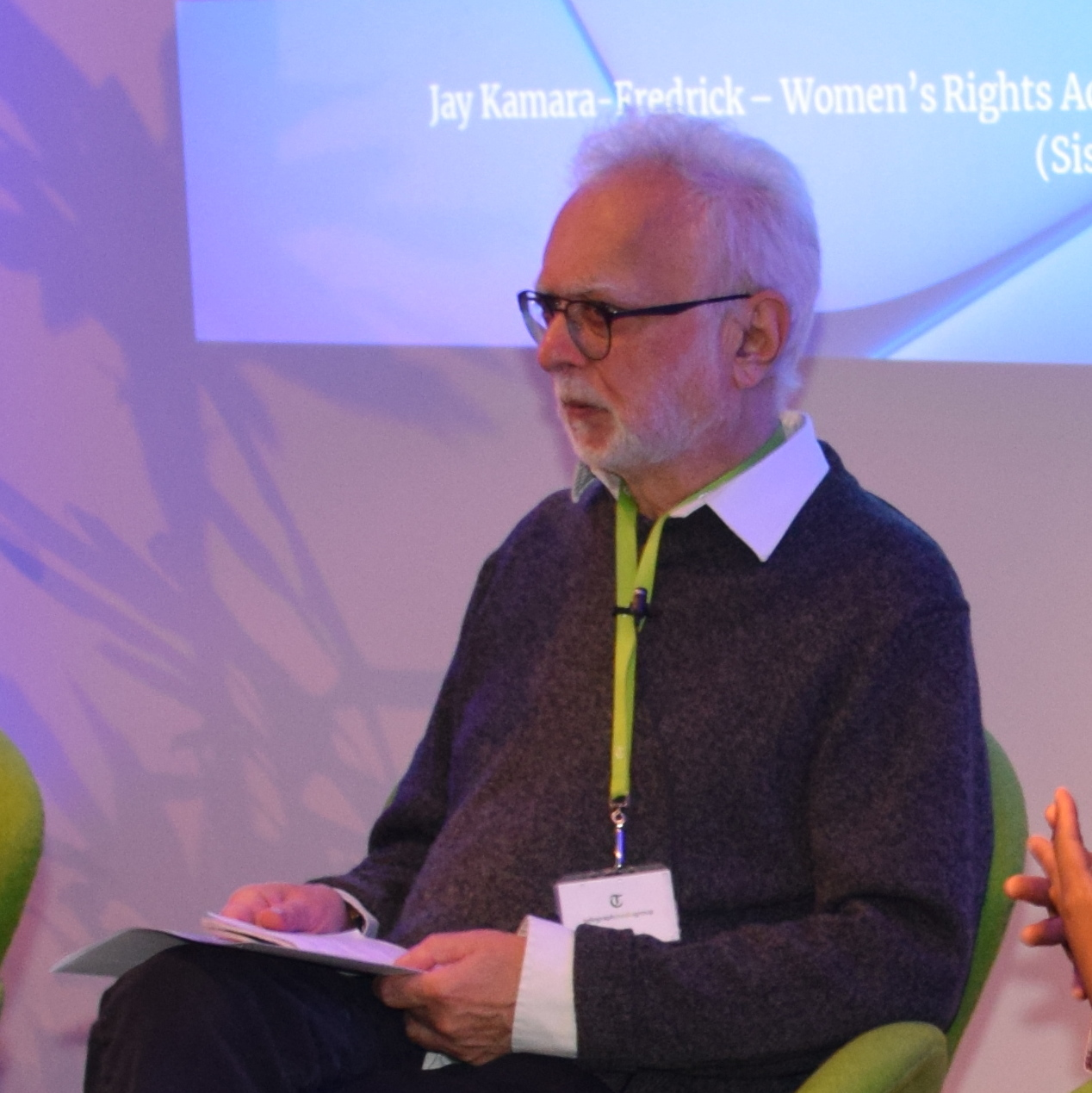
- Born: 1944 (age 81–82); Poona, India
- Education: The Bishop's School; University of Poona; Pembroke College, Cambridge; University of Leicester
- Occupations: Writer, playwright, screenwriter, activist
- Spouse: Mala Sen (m. 1968; div. 1976)
- Children: Tir Dhondy

Farrukh Dhondy (born 1944) is an Indian-born British Parsi writer, playwright, screenwriter and left-wing activist, who resides in the United Kingdom, where he first came in the 1960s. He was the Commissioning Editor for Multicultural Programmes at Channel 4 television from 1984 until 1997, during which time he commissioned such programmes as Bandung File and Devil's Advocate.

== Early life and education ==
Dhondy was born in 1944 in Poona, India, son of Lieutenant Colonel Jamshed Dhondy, of the Indian Army, and Anita Shireen. He has two sisters. He attended The Bishop's School, and obtained a BSc degree from Nowrosjee Wadia College, affiliated with the University of Poona (1964). He won a scholarship to Pembroke College, Cambridge, where he read Natural Sciences before switching to English, earning a BA degree in 1967. After graduating from Cambridge, he studied for a master's degree at Leicester University and was later a lecturer at Leicester College of Further Education and Archbishop Temples School, Lambeth, London.

== Early activism ==
In Leicester, Dhondy became involved with the Indian Workers' Association and later, in London, with the British Black Panthers, joining the publication Race Today in 1970, along with his close friend Darcus Howe, and former partner Mala Sen (with whom he had eloped to the UK in 1965), and discovering his calling as a writer. As a media executive, Dhondy was Commissioning Editor at Channel 4 television from 1984 to 1997, taking over from the inaugural holder of the position, Sue Woodford. Programmes that Dhondy commissioned included Bandung File, Devil's Advocate and Desmond's.

== Writing ==
Dhondy's literary output is extensive, including books for children, textbooks and biographies, as well as plays for theatre and scripts for film and television. He is also a columnist, and a biographer (of C. L. R. James; 2001). During Dhondy's time with Channel 4, he wrote the comedy series Tandoori Nights (1985–87) for the channel, which concerned the rivalry of two curry-house owners.

His children's stories include KBW (Keep Britain White), a study of a young white boy's response to anti-Bengali racism. In 2011, Dhondy published his translation of selections from the Sufi poet Jalaluddin Rumi, Rumi: a New Translation. Dhondy also wrote the screenplay for the 2005 Bollywood historical blockbuster Mangal Pandey: The Rising, starring Aamir Khan and Toby Stephens. In 2012, Dhondy scripted a short film called The K File. This film dealt with a fictional take on the judgement of Ajmal Kasab and was directed by Oorvazi Irani. In 2013, Dhondy's play Devdas was premiered in London and was subsequently replayed globally. 2013 also saw the publication of his novel Prophet of Love (HarperCollins). His collection of Rumi translations was published in 2014.

Dhondy was featured by journalist Subi Shah in the political magazine New Internationalist, in its "final page", which led to the resurgence of his lifelong campaign to recruit more BAME talent in the television industry. Shah's article was subsequently reprinted in the New Statesman (covered in The Voice newspaper).

Dhondy's latest book, Hawk and Hyena, follows the story of Charles Sobhraj. Dhondy appeared on the podcast The Literary City with Ramjee Chandran to talk about his escapades with Sobhraj as well as about his autobiography, Fragments Against My Ruin: A Life. Dhondy was at the 2022 Jaipur Literature Festival, London edition, to talk about his books.

His daughter, Tir Dhondy, is a documentary presenter for the BBC, Channel 4, and other stations.

== Honours and awards ==
- Children's Rights Workshop Other award: 1977, for East End at Your Feet, and 1979, for Come to Mecca, and Other Stories;
- Collins/Fontana Award for Come to Mecca, and Other Stories;
- Works represented in Children's Fiction in Britain, 1900–1990 exhibition, British Council's Literature Department, 1990;
- Whitbread Award for first novel, 1990, for Bombay Duck.

== Books ==
- East End at Your Feet (short stories), London: Macmillan Publishers, 1976.
- Come to Mecca, and Other Stories, London: Collins, 1978.
- The Siege of Babylon (novel), London: Macmillan, 1978.
- Poona Company (short stories), London: Gollancz, 1980.
- Trip Trap (short stories), Faber and Faber (London, England), 1985.
- Vigilantes, Hobo Press, 1988
- Bombay Duck (adult novel), London: Jonathan Cape (London, England), 1990.
- Black Swan, Gollancz (London, England), 1992, Boston, MA: Houghton Mifflin Harcourt, 1993.
- Janacky and the Giant, and Other Stories, London: HarperCollins, 1993.
- C. L. R. James: Cricket, The Caribbean and World Revolution, 205pp, London: Weidenfeld & Nicolson, 2001.
- The Bikini Murders, based on the life of Charles Shobhraj (also known as "the Bikini Killer"), 2008. Currently in production as a feature film.
- Rumi: A New Translation (trans. & ed.), Harper Perennial, 2011
- Prophet Of Love, HarperCollins, 2013
- Fragments Against My Ruin: A Life (autobiography), 2021

== Plays ==
- Mama Dragon, produced in London, England, 1980.
- Trojans (adaptation of a play by Euripides), produced in London, England, 1982.
- Kipling Sahib, produced in London, England, 1982.
- Vigilantes (produced in 1985), Hobo Press, 1988.
- King of the Ghetto (television series), British Broadcasting Company (BBC1), 1986.
- Split Wide Open (screenplay; based on the story by Dev Benegal), Adlabs/BMG Crescendo, 1999.
- Devdas, premiered in London, 2013.

== See also ==
- Bandit Queen, 1994 film based on late wife Mala Sen's book India's Bandit Queen: The True Story of Phoolan Devi (1993)
- Red Mercury (2005)
- The Interview (2021 film)
- Dennis, Ferdinand; Khan, Naseem, eds. (2000). Voices of the Crossing. London: Serpent's Tail. pp. 163–174. ISBN 9781852425838.
