= Women's Auxiliary Corps (India) =

The Women's Auxiliary Corps (India) (WAC(I)) was created in March 1942, out of the Women's Auxiliary Service (Burma). By the end of the Second World War, it had recruited 11,500 women.

Recruits had to be a minimum age of 18 years and their duties were clerical or domestic. In December 1942, the minimum age was reduced to 17 years. Volunteers could enlist on Local service or General service terms. Those on General service could be sent to serve anywhere in India.

Compared to over two million men, the corps of 11,500 women was small, but recruitment was always hampered by caste and communal inhibitions. Indian women at the time did not mix socially or at work with men and a large part of the corps was formed from the mixed-race Anglo–Indian community. The WAC(I) had an autonomous Air Wing, which served as the Indian counterpart of the WAAF: the women operated switchboards and similar duties at airfields and air headquarters (AHQ). In the earlier part of the war there was likewise a Naval Wing, but with the very localised environment of naval base and the very distinct ethos of the wartime naval services, British and Indian, this department was formally hived-off, in 1944, to become: the Women's Royal Indian Naval Service (WRINS), with its own uniform, similar to WRNS.

== Personnel ==
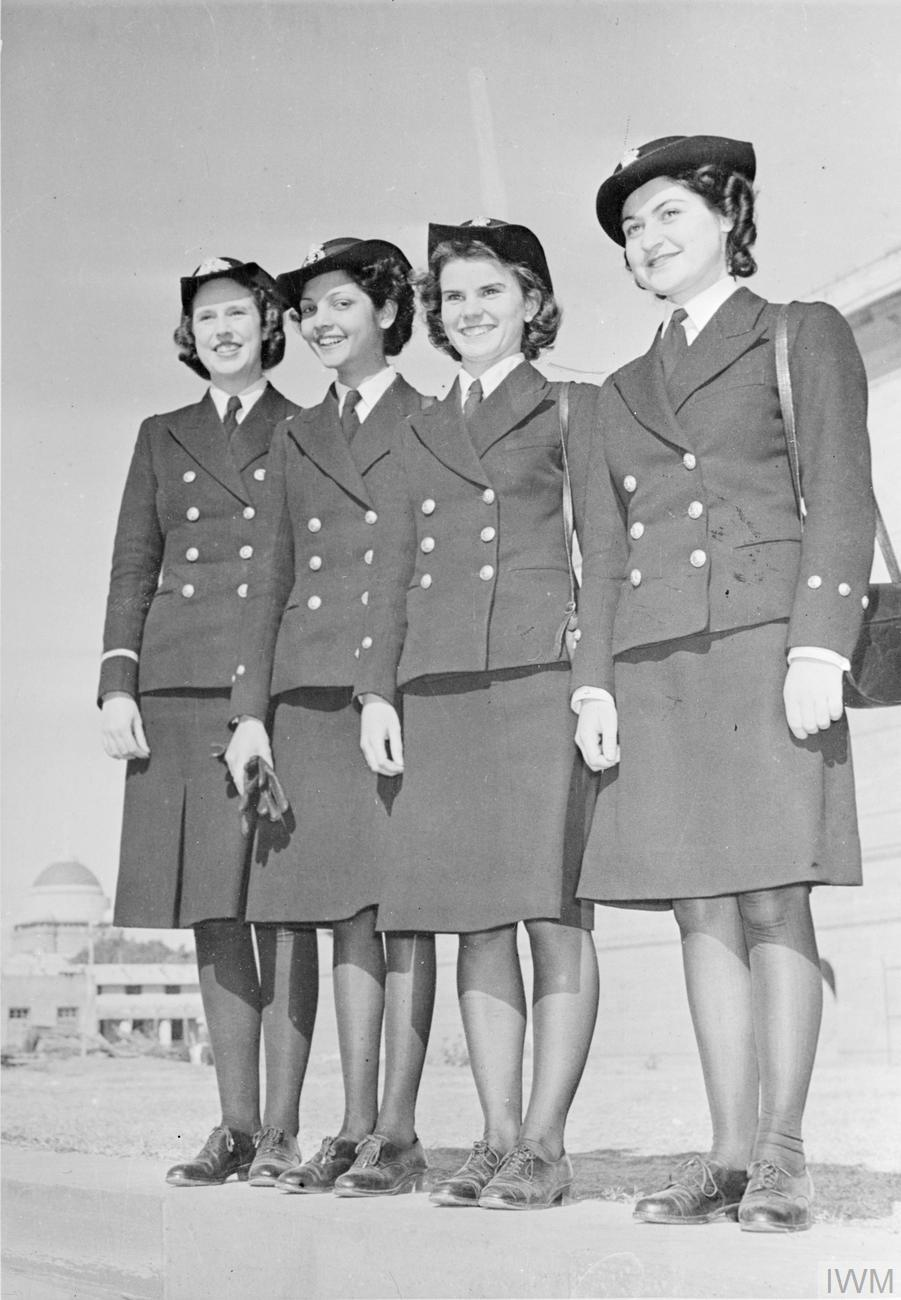
Commonwealth Forces in India, Imam is second from left

- Moina Imam, chief petty officer from Bihar, was among the first Indian girls to join the (WAC(I)) and became its poster girl.
- Kate Orchard, worked as a plotter.

== Gallery ==
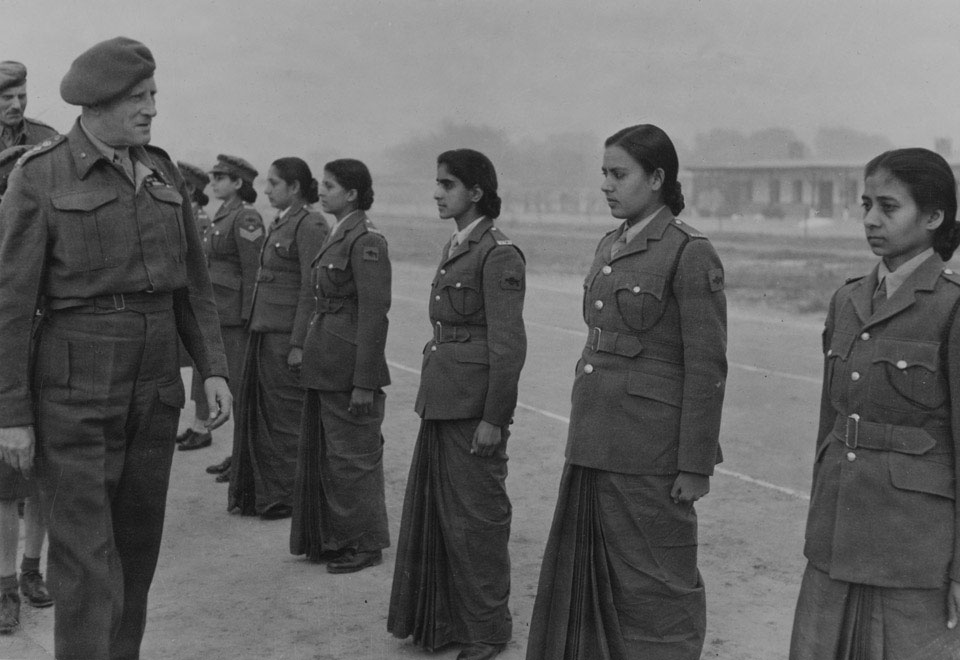
Inspection by Field Marshal Auchinleck

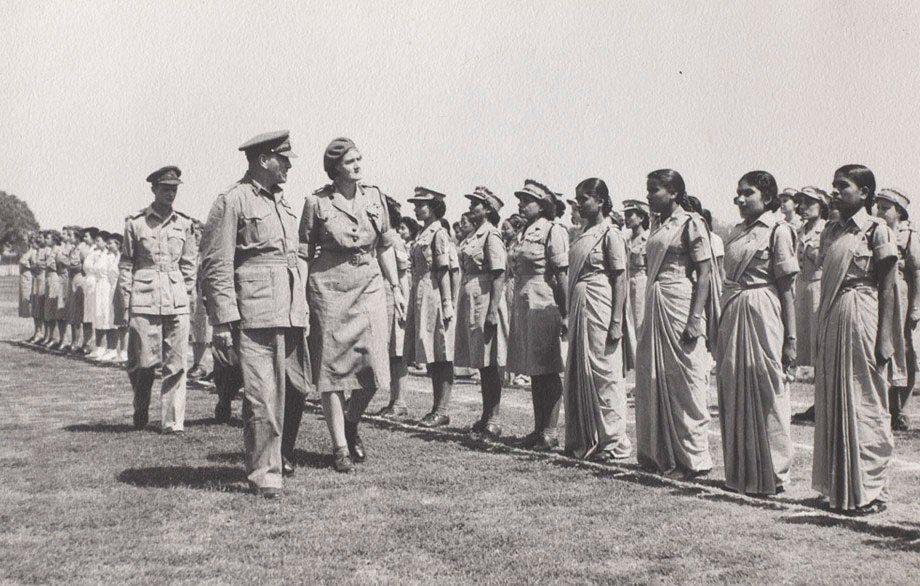
Inspection by Field Marshal Auchinleck

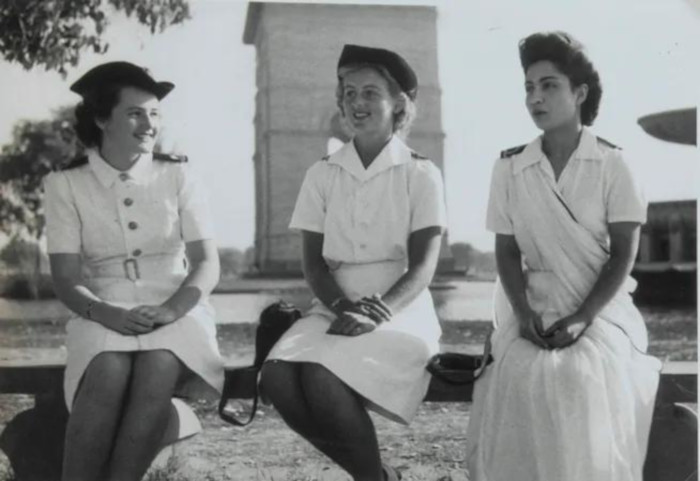
Women Auxiliary Corps (India)

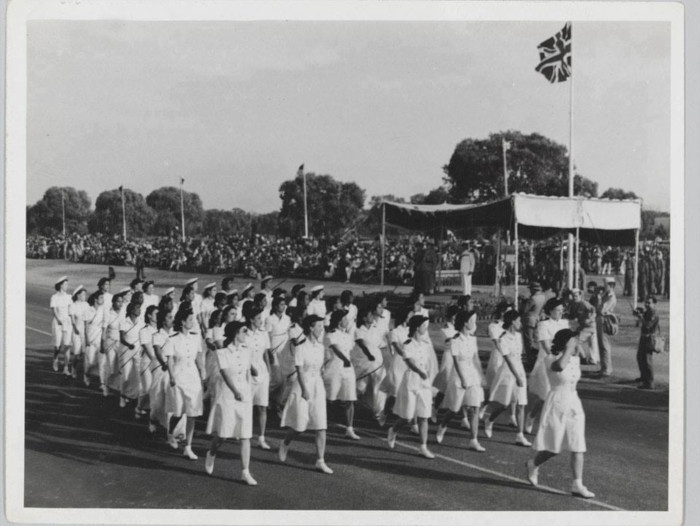
Women Auxiliary Corps parade

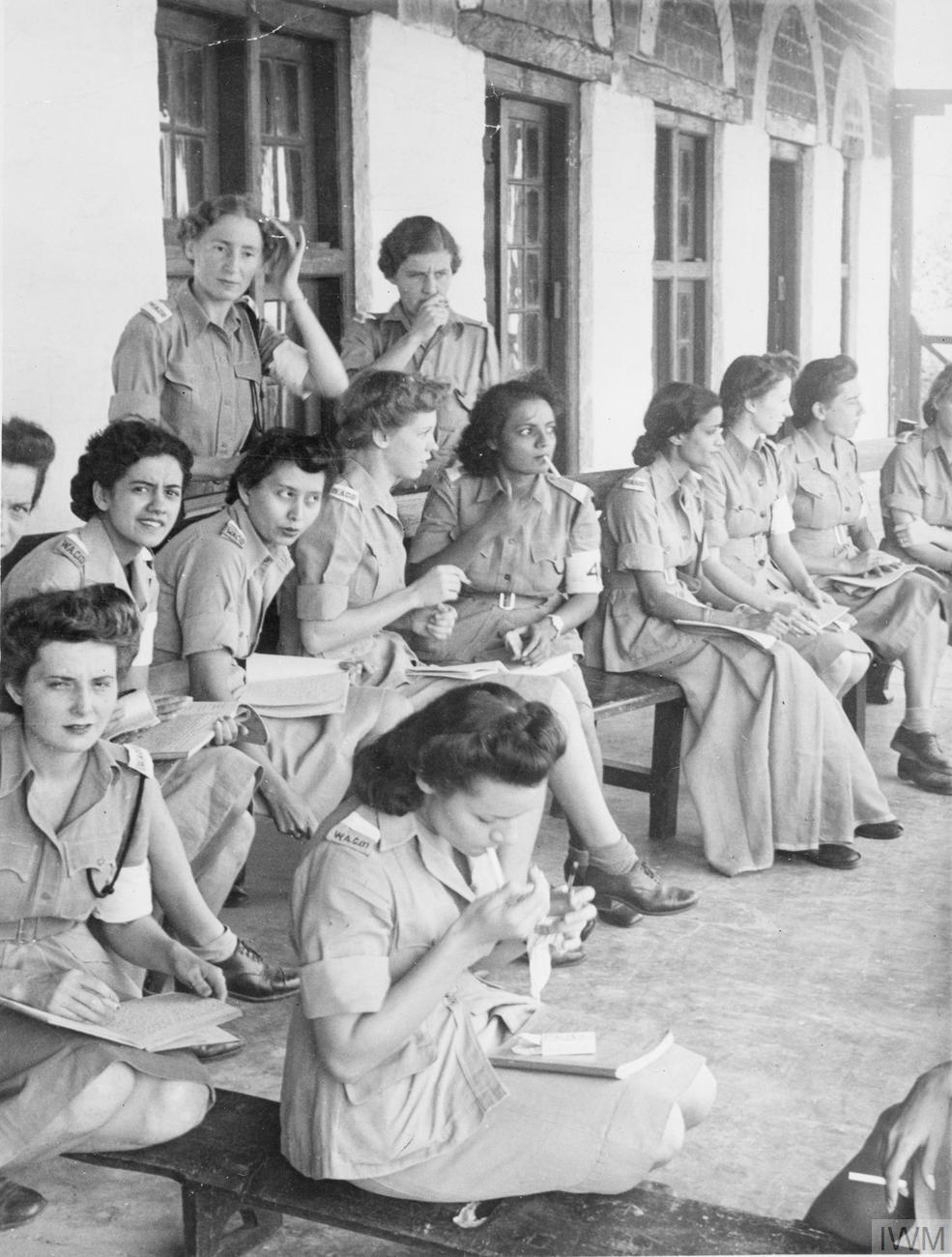
Indian Women's Auxiliary Corps at Dagshai

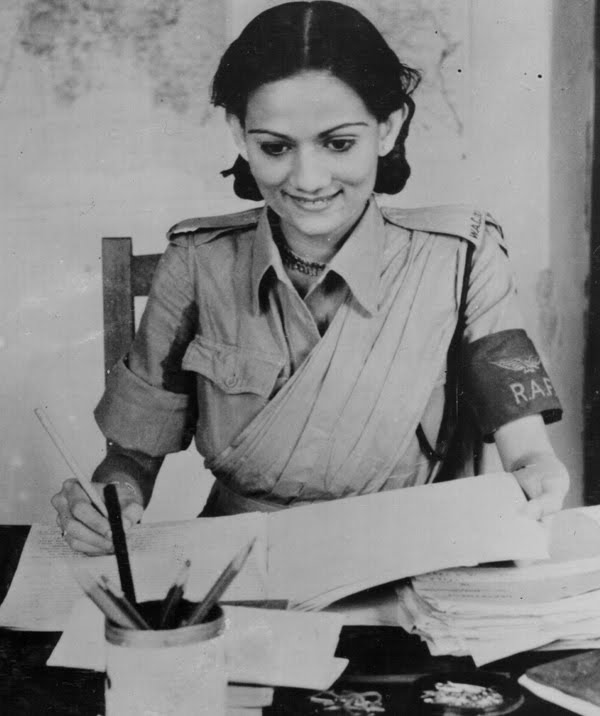
Private Begum Pasha Shah

== See also ==
- Women in World War II
- Women in the Indian Armed Forces
