= Kumudini Tyagi =

Indian aviator

Sub-Lieutenant Kumudini Tyagi
- Born: 1997 (age 28–29); Ghaziabad, Uttar Pradesh, India
- Education: B. Tech in Computer Science
- Alma mater: ABES Engineering College, Ghaziabad
- Occupation: Observer (Airborne Tactician) in the helicopter fleet
- Organization: Indian Navy
- Known for: First of 2 airborne combatant ladies operating from Indian warships
- Parents: Pravesh Kumar Tyagi (father); Reena Tyagi (mother)

Sub-Lieutenant Kumudini Tyagi is a serving officer in the Indian Navy. She is one of the first two women, along with Sub-Lieutenant Riti Singh, to have earned their wings for operating from Indian Navy warships.

== Early life ==
Tyagi was born in Ghaziabad, in 1997 to Pravesh Kumar Tyagi and Reena Tyagi. The family hails from Kharkhoda, Meerut, but moved to Ghaziabad in 1983. Her grandfather, Suresh Chand Tyagi was a sub-inspector with the Uttar Pradesh Police, and her father, Pravesh runs a security agency. Kumudini's grandmother's name is Rajesh Kumari Tyagi. She has a younger brother, Apoorv Tyagi, who has also cleared the written examination of the combined defence services. The family lives in Sanjay Nagar Sector-23, Ghaziabad.

== Education ==
Tyagi completed her ICSE (Class X) from St. Paul's Academy, Rajnagar, and her CBSE (Class XII) from Ch.Chhabil Dass Public School. She earned her Bachelor of Technology in Computer Science from ABES Engineering College while topping the college. She was passionate about joining the defence forces, and the tragic 2015 incident in which Kiran Shekhawat was martyred, impacted her deeply. She went on to be commissioned into the Navy in December 2018, even though she had a very lucrative alternate job offer. Her family describes her as a studious, but fit girl.

== Career ==
Tyagi completed the 22nd Short Service Commission Observer Course from Southern Naval Command, Kochi. This included 60 hours of flying training including sorties and simulator flights. While in training, she stood first among the ladies in the Inter Squadron Novices X-Country Championship, 2019, clocking 46 min 29 sec in the 8Km run.

On 21 September 2020, Tyagi was inducted as an Observer (Airborne Tactician) in the helicopter fleet of the Indian Navy. She was among a group of 17 officers, including four women officers, and three officers of the Indian Coast Guard, who were awarded "Wings" on graduating as "Observers" at a ceremony held at INS Garuda, Kochi. Rear Admiral Antony George, Chief Staff Officer (Training), presiding over the ceremony, highlighted it as a landmark occasion. Ajay Shankar Pandey, district magistrate of Ghaziabad, commented that the district of Ghaziabad plan a felicitation for her upon return form duty. Her family was unable to attend the historic occasion due to the COVID-19 situation.

Tyagi's training includes Air Navigation, Flying Procedure, Air Warfare, Anti-Submarine Warfare. She is now training to operate a host of sensors onboard navy multi-role, or Utility Helicopters, including sonar consoles and Intelligence, Surveillance and Reconnaissance (ISR) payloads. She is likely to fly in the MH-60R Seahawk. Her deployments are expected to be on frontline Indian Navy warships including long duration missions.

== See also ==
- Riti Singh
- Kiran Shekhawat
- Shivangi (pilot)
- Avani Chaturvedi
- Mohana Singh Jitarwal
- Bhawana Kanth
- Gunjan Saxena
