= Shivangi Singh =

Indian aviator (born 1995)

Lieutenant Shivangi Singh
- Born: 15 March 1995 (age 31); Fatehabad, Bihar, India
- Alma mater: Dav Public School, Bakhri (primary schooling) Sikkim Manipal University, Gangtok (B.Tech.)
- Military career
- Allegiance: India
- Service: Indian Navy
- Service years: 2019–present
- Rank: Lieutenant (aircraft pilot)

Lieutenant Shivangi Singh (born 15 March 1995) is an Indian serving in the Indian Navy. Lt. Shivangi hails from Fatehabad Village of Muzaffarpur District, Bihar and previously flew the pilatus aircraft. Lt. Shivangi (Indian Navy) and Flight Lt. Shivangi Singh (Indian Air Force) are two different people.

== Early life ==
Shivangi Singh was born on 15 March 1995 in Muzaffarpur district of Bihar, India to school teacher Hari Bhushan Singh and house wife Priyanka Singh. Shivangi hails from a humble agricultural background. During her childhood, she was captivated by the sight of seeing a politician using a helicopter to attend a political gathering in her native village, which inspired her to become a pilot. Hari Bhushan Singh, her father, is now the principal of a girls-only government school constructed on land donated by Shivangi's great grandfather, who donated it to enable people to overcome the conservative abhorrence of educating girls. Her mother Priyanka is a housewife.

She obtained a Bachelor of Technology degree in mechanical engineering from Sikkim Manipal Institute of Technology. Shivangi began further studies at the Malaviya National Institute of Technology in Jaipur.

== Career ==
Shivangi was inducted into the Indian Navy under the Short Service Commission (SSC)-Pilot entry scheme. In June 2018, she was commissioned into the Indian Navy. She undertook two successive six month courses; first the Naval Orientation Course at the Indian Naval Academy, and the second at Air Force Academy where she trained on the Pilatus PC 7 MkII aircraft. In the six months prior to December 2019, she learnt flying the Dornier aircraft at the Indian Naval Air Squadron 550.

Shivangi is among the batch of the first three women pilots of the Indian Navy, including Lt Shubhangi Swaroop and Lt Divya Sharma.

She is slated to subsequently become an operational pilot on Maritime Reconnaissance (MR) aircraft after completing her training, as of December 2019.

She also flew as first pilot along with Lt CDR Aanchal, Lt Apurva, Lt Pooja panda and Slt Pooja shekhawat in the maiden all women crew mission of Indian Navy from INAS 314, NAE Porbandar.

== See also ==
- Gunjan Saxena
- Shubhangi Swaroop
- Avani Chaturvedi
- Mohana Singh Jitarwal
- Bhawana Kanth
- Riti Singh
- Kumudini Tyagi
