= Riti Singh =

Indian navy pilot (born 1996)

LCdr Riti Singh
- Born: 1995 (age 30–31); Lucknow, Uttar Pradesh
- Occupation: Air Operations Officer in combat helicopter
- Years active: 2020 -
- Employer: Indian Navy
- Known for: First of 2 airborne combatant ladies operating from ships

LCdr Riti Singh is a serving officer in the Indian Navy. She is one of the first two women, along with LCdr Kumudini Tyagi, to have earned their wings for operating from warships.

== Early life ==
Riti comes from a family that has a history of serving in the armed forces for four generations. Her grandfather served as a signals officer in the Indian Army. Her father, Commander S K Singh, retired from the Indian Navy. Her mother is an English teacher, and she has an elder sister, Riya. Both her parents helped her train for the entrance exam.

She was born in 1996 in Uttar Pradesh, where the family hails from. They moved to Hyderabad, Telangana in 2002. She holds a Bachelor of Technology in Computer Science.

== Career ==
Riti completed the 22nd Short Service Commission Observer Course from Southern Naval Command, Kochi. This included 60 hours of flying training including sorties and simulator flights.

On September 21, 2020, Riti was inducted as an Observer (Airborne Tactician) in the helicopter fleet of the Indian Navy. She was among a group of 17 officers, including four women officers, and three officers of the Indian Coast Guard, who were awarded "Wings" on graduating as "Observers" at a ceremony held at INS Garuda, Kochi. Rear Admiral Antony George, Chief Staff Officer (Training), presiding over the ceremony, highlighted it as a landmark occasion.

Her training includes Air Navigation, Flying Procedure, Air Warfare, Anti-Submarine Warfare. She is now training to operate a host of sensors onboard navy multi-role, or Utility Helicopters, including sonar consoles and Intelligence, Surveillance and Reconnaissance (ISR) payloads. She is likely to fly in the MH-60R Seahawk. Her deployments are expected to be on frontline Indian Navy warships including long duration missions.

== See also ==
- Kumudini Tyagi
- Shivangi (pilot)
- Avani Chaturvedi
- Mohana Singh Jitarwal
- Bhawana Kanth
- Gunjan Saxena
- Kiran Shekhawat
