= Riti (name) =

Riti is both a given name and a surname. Notable people with the name include:

- Riti Pathak (born 1977), Indian politician
- Riti Singh (born 1996), Indian Navy pilot
- Rob Riti (born 1976), American football player
