= Aawra, Udaipur =

Village In Udaipur, Rajasthan, India

Coordinates: 24.356°N 74.041°E

Aawra is a small village situated in the Girwa Tehsil of Udaipur district in the Indian state of Rajasthan. It is basically a semi-mountainous area which is located at the height of 540 meters above sea level.

== Demographic ==
The hamlet comes under the Panchayat of Aawra. It belongs to the division of Udaipur division. The PIN code of the village is 313706 and it falls under the Bambora post office. The nearest water sources are mostly hand pumps, rivers, canals, uncovered wells and remaining water stored resources. Waste water flows by open drainage.

== Education ==
The following are the schools and colleges situated near to Aawra village –

Schools.

- Shanti Niketan Ups Bambora
- G.u.p.s.manpura
- Deep Jyptsna Ps Gudli
- Akliya Acadami

Colleges

- Advent Institute Of Management Studies
- Geetanjali College Of Pharmaceutical Studies

== Population ==
The census code location number of 2001 is 03167800 & 2011 is 106656. The overall area of the village is 265.6 hectares with the total population of 745 with number of households 165.

== Geography ==
Hindi and Rajasthani (Mewari) are the two languages used to communicate here. The village also has nearby health care facilities such as a primary Health sub centre with some non-government medical facilities. The telephone code of the village is 0294.

== Transportation ==
The nearest railway stations are -

- Mavli Jn MVJ
- Ranapratapnagar RPZ

Nearest Airports are -

- Nal Airport, Bikaner, Rajasthan
- Jaipur International Airport, Jaipur, Rajasthan
- Maharana Pratap Airport, Udaipur, Rajasthan
