= Anand Prakash =

Indian ethical hacker

- Born: Rajasthan, India
- Education: B.Tech Computer Science in VIT
- Occupation: Ethical hacker

Anand Prakash is an Indian ethical hacker and entrepreneur from Rajasthan. He is the Founder & CEO of PingSafe, which SentinelOne acquired for over $100 million. He was named in Forbes 30 Under 30 2017 Asia list.

== Early life and education ==
Prakash was born in Bhadra, Rajasthan, India. He studied B.Tech Computer Science at Vellore Institute of Technology.

== Career ==
He started his career in 2014 as a security engineer at Flipkart. After this, in 2016, he started a red teaming startup named AppSecure. Then, in 2021, another company named PingSafe was established, which was acquired in 2024 by American cyber security company SentinelOne for over $100 million.

== Notable works ==
- He found a bug in 2016 on Facebook which allowed the takeover of any account.
- He discovered a bug in Uber in 2017 that allowed anyone to take Uber rides for free.
- In 2018, he found a security flaw in Tinder, after which he was given a reward of ₹4 lakh (US$4,200).
- In 2019, he found a bug in Uber, after which he was given a reward of $5500.
- In April 2023, he found a "security flaw" in LinkedIn that could have led to the deletion of any posts.
