= Pravega Racing =

Formula-SAE combustion team

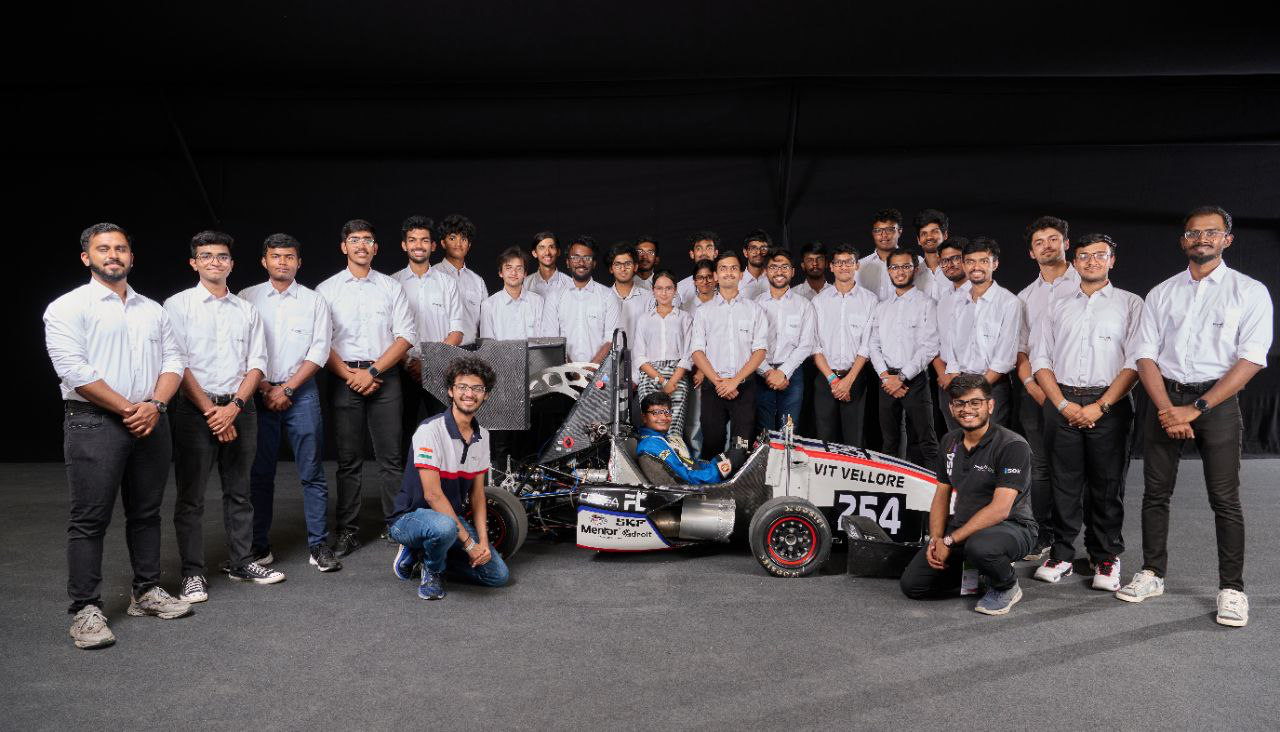
- Full Name: Pravega Racing
- Base: Vellore Institute of Technology
- Chief Executive Officer: Krish Mehta
- Chief Technical Officer: Vishrut Ram
- Chief Operations Officer: Biprajit Deb
- Chief Management Officer: Devraj Roy
- Website: pravega-racing.com

2025-26 Formula Student Season
- Current Model: PRV25
- Chassis: Chromoly Space Frame
- Engine: KTM 390
- Tyres: Hoosier 16x7.5-10 R20
- Wheels: 3 Piece Custom Aluminium Wheel Rims

Formula Student World Championship
- Debut: 2010 Formula Student USA
- Competitions Competed: 6x Formula Student Germany; 3x Formula Student Italy; 5x Formula Student India; 1x Formula Student Australia; 1x Formula Student USA; 1x Formula Student East

Pravega Racing is the Formula-SAE combustion team of Vellore Institute of Technology, Vellore, India. The primary aim of the team is to design, manufacture, and test a single seater race car and compete in the Formula Student and FSAE events.

== History ==
Pravega Racing was established in 2005 by a group of students from Vellore Institute of technology (VIT) with the aim of providing hands on practical experience for the students. The team Bootstrapped and made a prototype race car in the next two years. It could build the final prototype due to paucity of funds, they had succeeded in creating a proof of concept which laid the foundation for all future endeavours.

The team secured third position in its first attempt in SAE-Design Challenge, 2009. The performance in the event motivated the members to take it to International Formula Student Events. In 2010 the team took part in Formula SAE West held in California, USA. Manufacturing a car that met the international standards was the biggest challenge faced in its maiden international outing. Although the team was not able to qualify the technical inspection, the motivated members secured 8th position in the Cost and Manufacturing Event.

One of the major challenges in the 2011 season came down to shifting from a 500 cc Kawasaki Engine to a 600 cc Honda CBR RR which caused delays in manufacturing, and henceforth the team was placed at an overall 45th position in Formula SAE Italy 2011.

In 2012, led by Hemant Agarwal, the mammoth task of manufacturing 2 cars in a single season was undertaken. The team improved its performance in the dynamic events in FSAE- Italy 2012 and dominated the Statics Event: 3rd in Cost and Manufacturing Event. The impressive Overall 3rd position in SAE-SUPRA 2012 established them as one of the front runners among the Indian Formula Student circuit.

The year 2013, was the breakthrough year for the team at FSAE-Italy. The car underwent a complete makeover for this season. Led by Prateek Sibal, the team won several accolades in the events such as 2nd in Cost and Manufacturing, 11th in Business Presentation, 19th in Engineering Design and 20th Overall. The team completed in the all-important endurance event for the first time as well.

The experience gained in Italy prompted the team to take part in a much more competitive environment. The team led by Sanshray Agarwal, was the only Indian team to participate in all the dynamic events at FSG 2014.

Following a similar concept as the Formula Student events, Formula Design Challenge 2015 was aimed to provide Indian FS teams with a better platform to test their potential. The event witnessed active participation from several luminaries of the automotive industry: Claude Rouelle and Pat Clarke (Design Judges). Headed by Kushagra Sinha, Pravega Racing completed the competition with podium finishes in all static events, a breathtaking run in the autocross event, and an Overall 3rd position. Following that, the team also participated in FSG 2015 and achieved the best statics result by any Indian team in Formula Student Germany history.

Gaining more experience, the team led by Tribhuvan Singh went onto participating at Formula Student India 2016, bagging several accolades, and winning 7 out of 11 trophies with podium finishes in all static events. In the same year, the team also took part in FSG 2016 where it proved to be the fastest among all Indian teams.

Moving upwards on the ladder of success, in 2017 the team led by Abhijai Tibrewala went onto become the defending champions at Formula Bharat 2017, bagging a total of 9 trophies with podium finishes in both static and dynamic events. The team was also awarded the Best Driver Award and a Special Award for Spirit of FSI. Further, the team also took part in FSG 2017 where it was one of the best Indian teams at the event.

The experience gained over the years helped the team move forward to participate at Formula SAE Australasia 2018, where the team led by Naman Shukla led onto gaining the highest ever points scored by an Indian team at the Engineering Design Event. The team was also awarded the FSAE-A Encouragement Award for its exhilarating performance.

In 2019, the team led by Nithin Shanmugam participated at FSG 2019, where the team got its first ever international podium by winning the D-BASF Best Use of 3D Printing Award. The team was also the highest to score in the Engineering Design Event among Indian Teams.

2020 saw the team take part in the Formula Student Online 2020. The team led by Prudhvi Rao became the only Indian team to participate in the virtual event. The team secured its highest ever overall finish and first podium in BPP at an international event.

Gaining the much needed experience, the team participated in FB 2021, where the team led by Harsh Singh went on to win the BPP and bag a podium finish.

2023 saw the team, led by Chetan Pratapaneni, take part in FB 2023, where the team secured 1st in Business Presentation, 2nd in Statics and an Overall 7th. This was followed by the team taking part in FS East 2023. The team secured 2nd in Business Presentation, 12th in Statics and an Overall 12th. The season end saw the team take part in FSG 2023, where the team secured 8th in Cost Analysis Event, 9th in Engineering Design Event, 10th in Business Presentation and an Overall 18th globally.

== Team Ideology ==
=== Philosophy ===
The team follows a simple policy: Having a respectful disregard for the impossible. Pravega Racing focuses on first building an ‘A’ team, and then building an ‘A’ car: As for the team members, they are not just students of a technical university but a right combination of engineers, writers, bloggers, designers, managers, analysts, strategists and drivers. The three pillars of our ideology are - pride, discipline and consistency. Our FSAE team's reputation is built on our pride in our achievements and the discipline we uphold in our work.

=== Team Structure ===
The team follows a “Functional Organizational Model” headed by the chief executive officer, Chief Technical Officer, Chief Operations Officer and Chief Management Officer of the team. The CEO is responsible for overseeing all the technical and management functions of the team and serves the role as the head of the team. The CTO's primary role is to make sure that the technical departments coordinate and work smoothly to achieve the team's overall goals. The COO is tasked with overseeing the day-to-day administrative and operational functions of the team. The CMO is responsible for activities related to creating, communicating and delivering offerings that have value for the team and sponsors.

The entire team's workflow is conducted through the Principal Engineers and Department Leads who validate and sanction duties of the Student/Junior Engineer. This system is then monitored by the CTO and the COO. Via the CTO, COO and the Department Leads, the work is completed within the prescribed stipulated time. The responsibility of overall project management, maintaining order and organizing stands with the CEO.

To testify the improvements carried out by the respected departments before and after the testing phases, a Testing Lead is appointed. The training of the drivers as well as validating the driver-car interactions to meeting the infield demands is undertaken by the Testing Lead. Static Leads focuses on the Business Presentation, Cost Report and Engineering Design Report events. The person in charge ensures that all the documents of any particular event remain intact without any discrepancies to the idea nor rules.

To maximize efficiency and productive output of individual departments, the Department Leads double their roles and head the Research and Development as well. The workforce is further split based on their skill set into Dynamics & Statics, BP & CR, Marketing and PR teams. This ensures frictionless communication and enables efficient coordination within the team.

== Formula Student Seasons ==
=== Season 2013-14 ===
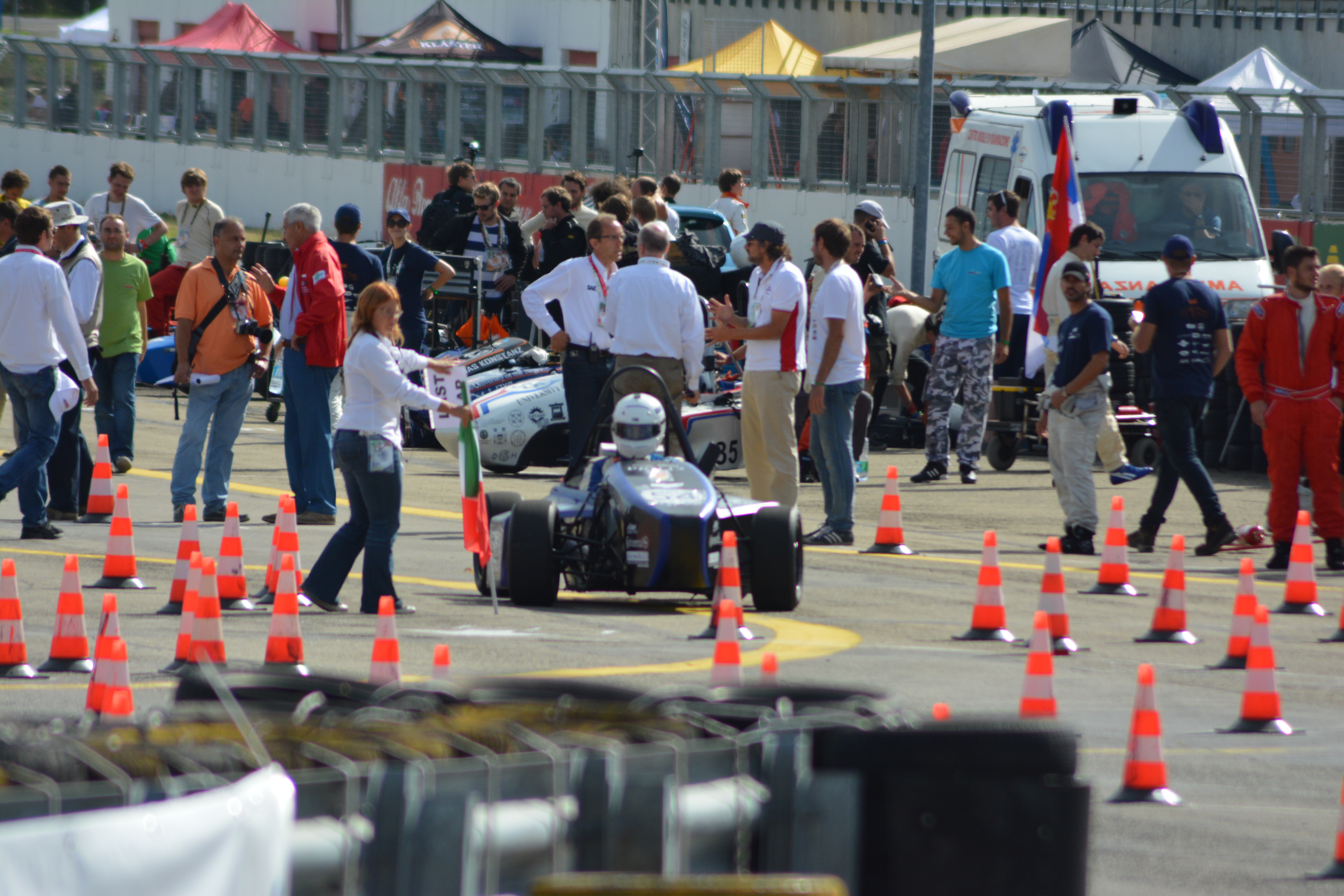
PRV13 taking part in FSAE Italy 2013

The season marked the introduction of new packages which gave the car, PRV13 a whole new look compared to the previous cars. The team captain Prateek Sibal lead the team to new heights at Formula Student Italy as the team came 20th overall in the event and competed for the first time in the endurance event.

==== Formula Student Italy 2013 ====
1. 2nd in Cost event
2. 11th in Business Presentation
3. 18th in Endurance
4. 19th in Design event
5. 25th in Acceleration event

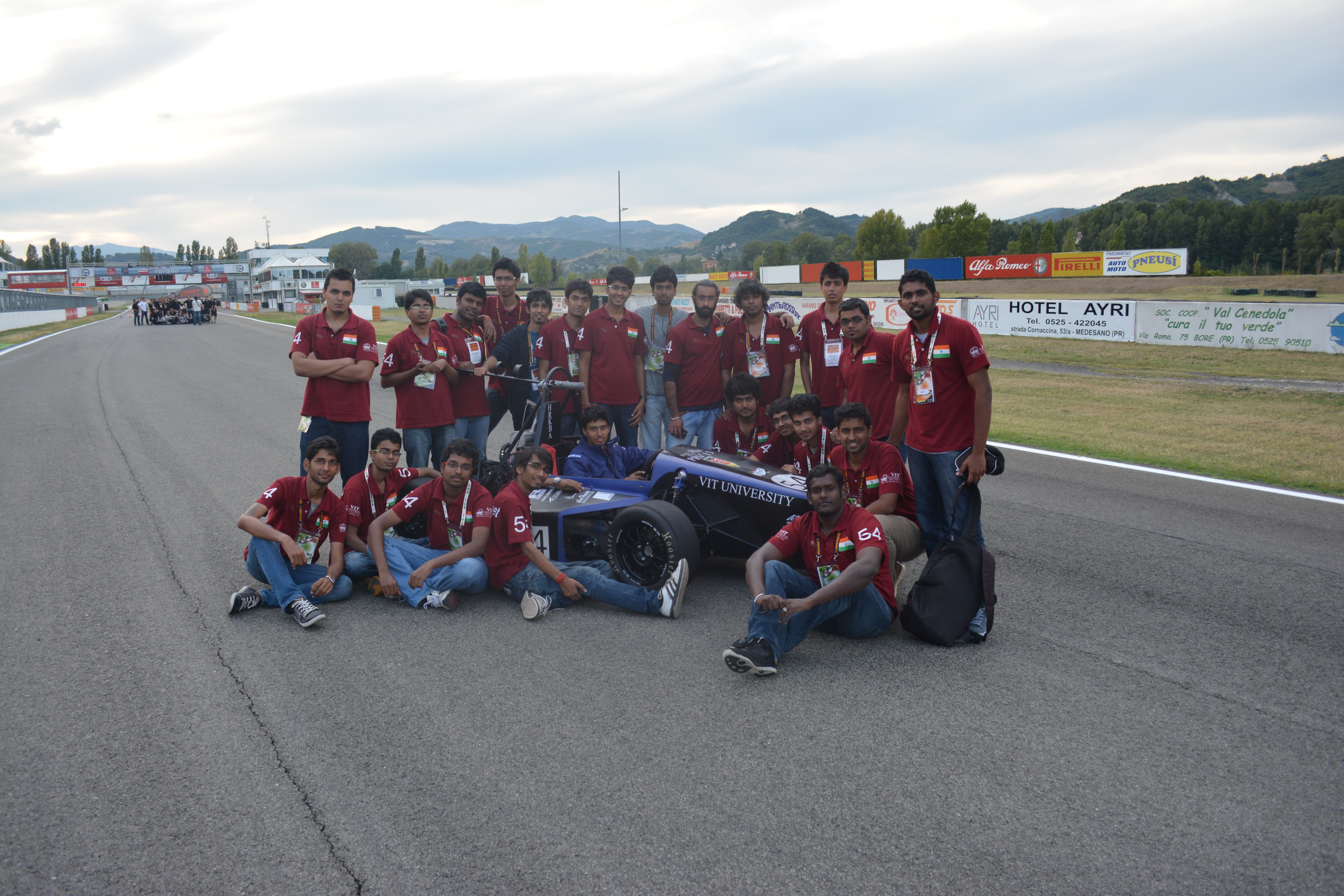
Team Members for 2013 Season

==== Technical Specifications of PRV 13 ====
Car Name	PRV 13
Car Number	54
Total Weight	283 kg
Wheelbase	1600 mm
Dampers	Tanner
Brakes Type	4 Outboard Discs
Chassis	Steel Space Frame
Suspension	Double Unequal Length A-arm with Push Rod actuated Spring Dampers
Wheels	13x7 Oz Racing Wheels
Tires Dry	Hoosier Racing Slicks
Tires Wet	Continental
Engine	Honda CBR 600RR
Displacement	600 CC
New Feature Added	Sequential 6 Speed Shift Electronic Shift button type Open Differential

=== Season 2014-15 ===
Gathering the relevant experience from the FSAE Events participated, the team decided to participate in the most competitive FSAE event held in Germany.

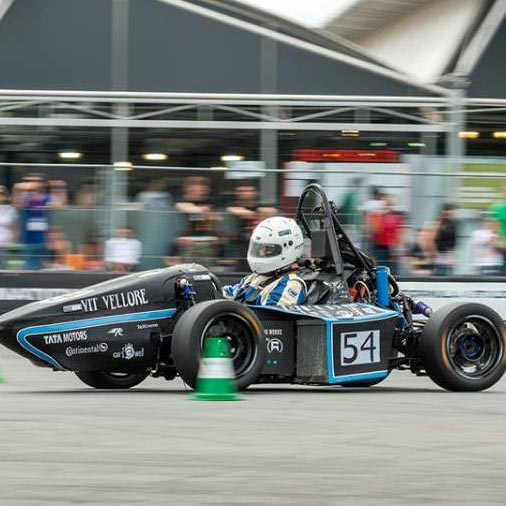
PRV14 during FSG 2014

The team led by Sanshray Agarwal entered the competition by being 1st in the scrutinizing exam. They also stood out by being the only Indian team to participate in all the dynamic events.

==== Formula Student Germany 2014 ====
1. They stood 1st worldwide in the scrutinizing exam.

2. Only Indian team to participate in all the dynamic events.

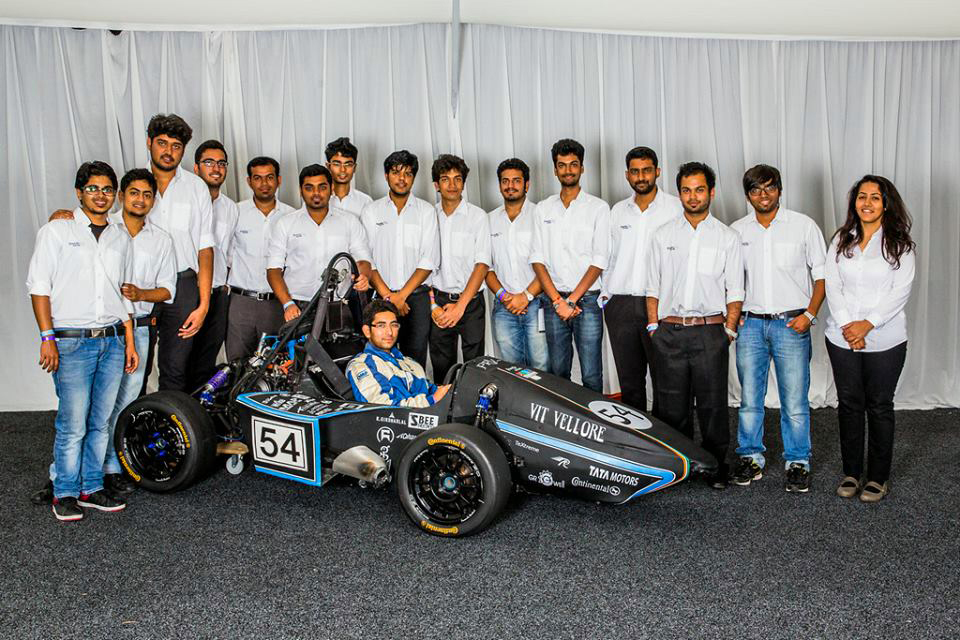
Team Members of the 2014-15 Season

==== Technical Specifications of PRV14 ====
Car Name	PRV14
Car Number	54
Total Weight	265 kg
Wheelbase	1600 mm
Dampers	Tanner
Brakes Type	4 Outboard Discs
Chassis	Steel Space Frame
Suspension	Double Unequal Length A-arm with Push Rod actuated Spring Dampers
Wheels	13x7 Oz Racing Wheels
Tires Dry	Hoosier Racing Slicks
Tires Wet	Continental
Engine	Honda CBR 600RR
Displacement	600 CC
New Feature Added	1. Student built Pneumatic Gear and Clutch Control Unit and Translogic Dashboard, 2. Twill layup Carbon Fiber body and Limited Slip Differential

=== Season 2015-16 ===
The 2015-16 Season started out fresh with the JK Tyre Formula Design Challenge, which was the first Indian Event the team took part in its history. Led by team captain Kushagra Sinha and team manager Shyam Mohan, the team won several accolades and was noted as they set the national record of completing the autocross lap in 1 Minute and 23 Second, which is still unbeaten. This was followed by their second participation in Formula Student Germany 2015, where the team stood out by giving the best results in the static events by an Indian Team in that event.

==== Achievements ====
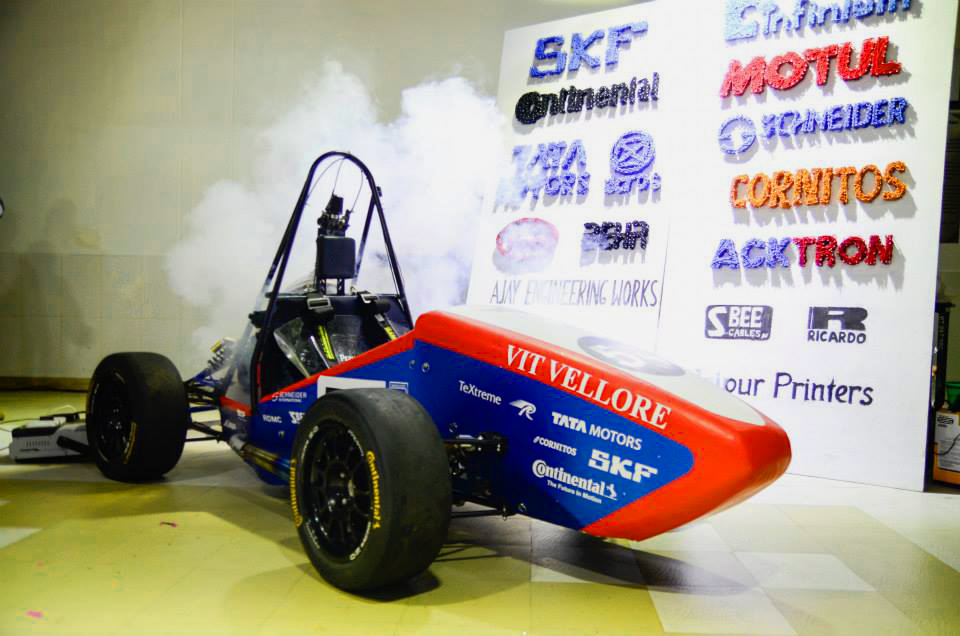
PRV15 for the 2015-16 Season

===== JK Tyre Formula Design Challenge 2015 =====
1. 3rd Overall
2. 2nd in Engineering Design Event.
3. 2nd in Auto Cross Events
4. 3rd in Business Presentation Event.
5. 3rd in Cost & Manufacturing Event.
6. 3rd in Skid pad Event.

===== Formula Student Germany 2015 =====
1. 8th in Cost & Manufacturing.
2. 10th in Business Presentation Event.
3. 21st in Engineering Design Event.

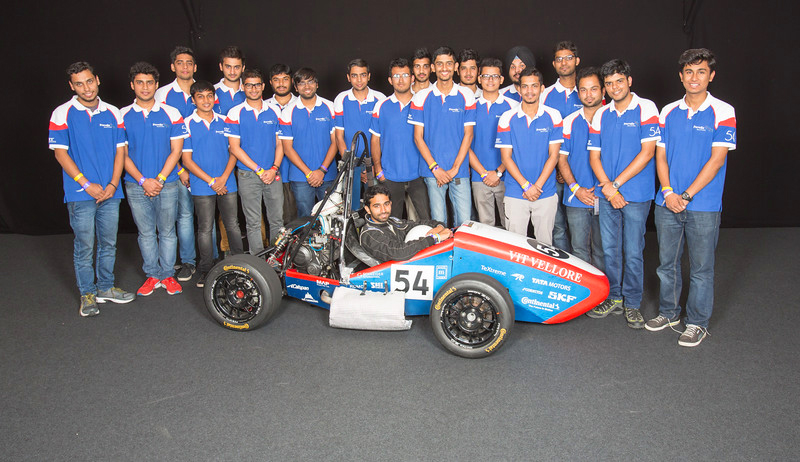
Team Members of 2015-16 Season

==== Technical Specifications of PRV15 ====
Car Name	PRV15
Car Number	54
Total Weight	235 kg
Wheelbase	1564 mm
Dampers	Ohlins TTX 25 Mk II 4 Way adjustable
Brakes Type	4 Outboard Discs
Chassis	Steel Space Frame
Suspension	Double Unequal Length A-arm with Push Rod actuated Spring Dampers
Wheels	13x7 Oz Racing Wheels
Tires Dry	Continental
Tires Wet	Continental
Engine	Honda CBR 600RR
Displacement	600 CC
New Feature Added	1. In house developed Pneumatic Gear and Clutch Control Unit.; 2. Carbon Epoxy Composite Body and Drexler Limited Slip Differential

=== Season 2016-17 ===
Season 2016-17 was the year that changed the whole face of the team as they started off by winning in 7 out of the 11 events in Formula Student India 2016. It was a big achievement which gave them enough motivation to deliver the best results given by an India Formula Student Team in Formula Student Germany.

The team led by Tribhuvan Singh and team manager Vyom Gautam was noted well in the event for being the fastest Indian car driven at Formula Student Germany. The team succeeded in delivering a stand out performance in the event as promised by them.

==== Achievements ====
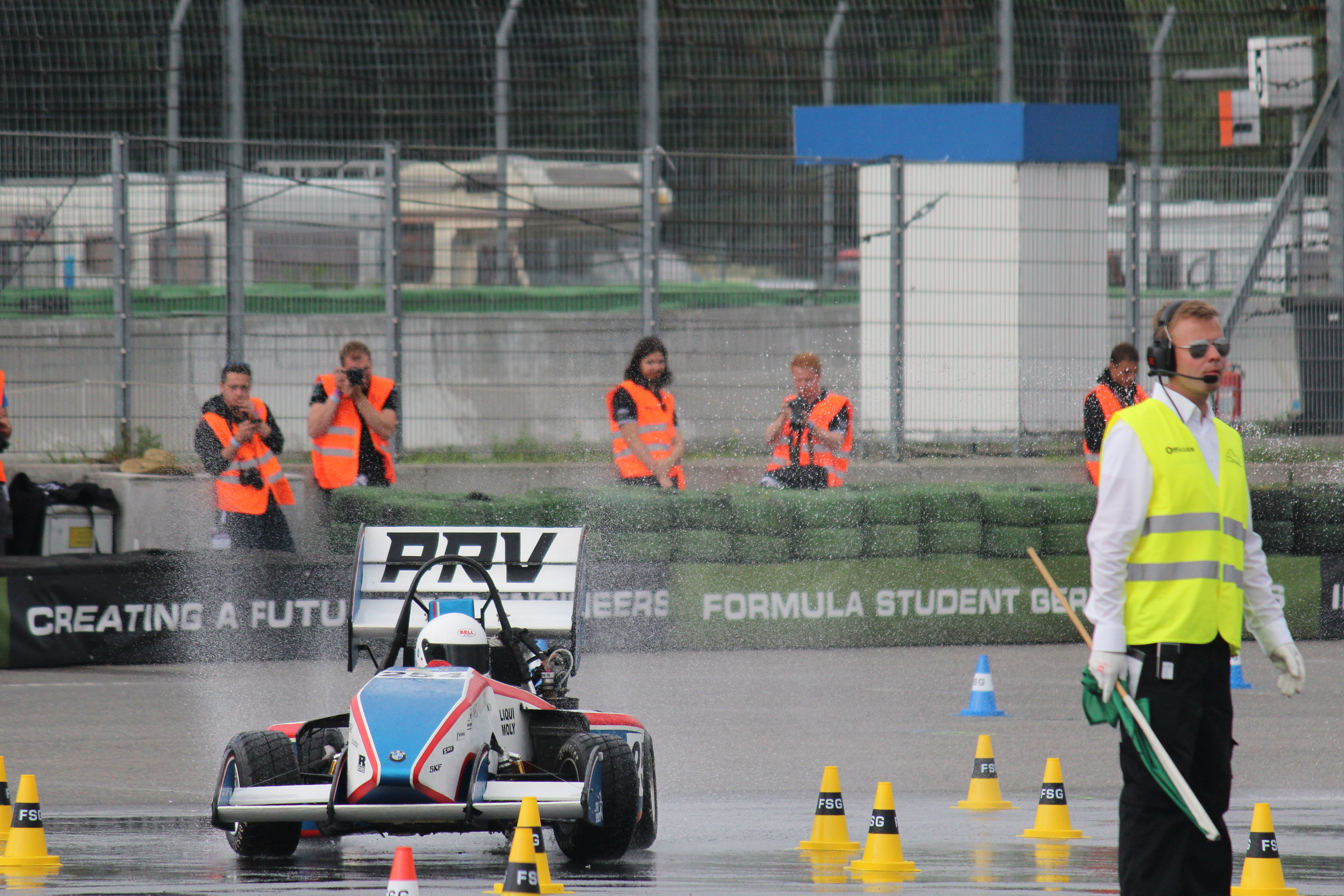
PRV16 during Skidpad Event

===== Formula Student India 2016 =====
1. 1st in the Acceleration Event
2. 1st in the Skid pad Event
3. 1st in the Business Presentation Event
4. 3rd in the Engineering Design Event
5. 3rd in the Cost & Manufacturing Event
6. Special Awards for Spirit of FSI and Cleanest Pit

===== Formula Student Germany 2016 =====
1. 13th in Business Presentation Event
2. 39th in Design Event
3. 40th in Cost Event
4. 37th in Acceleration Event (4.65 seconds)
5. 41st in Skidpad Event (6.39 seconds)
6. 53rd in AutoCross Event (87.88 seconds)

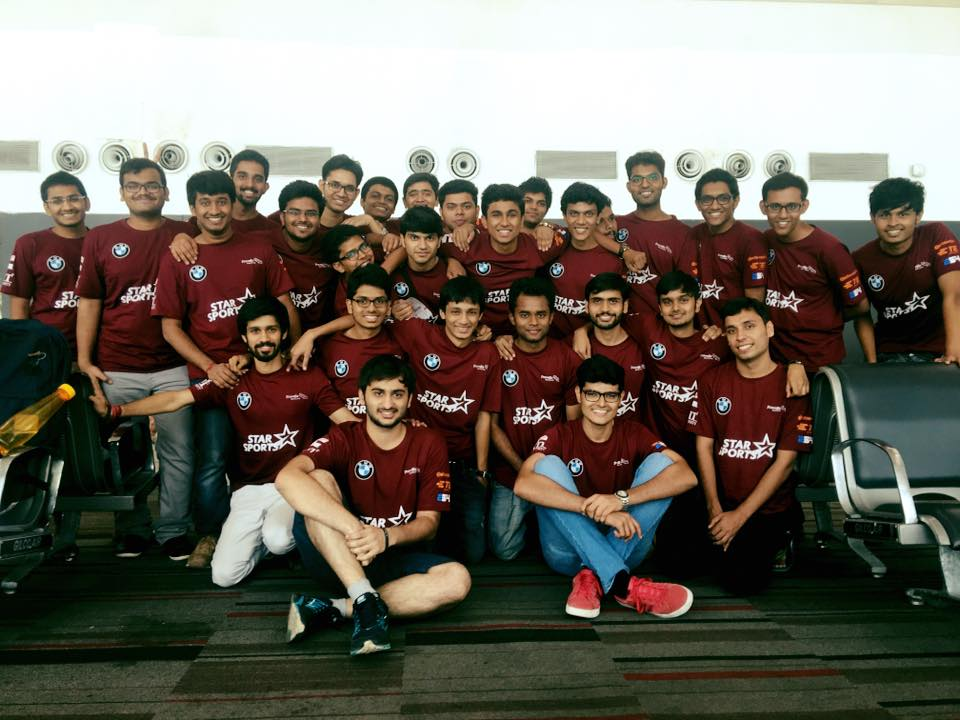
Team Members of the 2016-17 Season

==== Technical Specifications of PRV16 ====
Car Name	PRV16
Car Number	54
Total Weight	257 kg
Wheelbase	1560 mm
Dampers	Ohlins TTX 25 Mk II 4 Way adjustable
Brakes Type	4 Outboard Discs
Chassis	Steel Space Frame
Suspension	Double Unequal Length A-arm with Push Rod actuated Spring Dampers
Wheels	Keizer 3 piece Aluminium Rims, 7x10
Tires Dry	Hoosier 18x7.5-10, R25B
Tires Wet	Hoosier, WET
Engine	Honda CBR 600RR
Displacement	600 CC
New Feature Added	1.Dry Sump Lubrication System 2.Introduced Aero Package including Front and Rear Wings

=== Season 2017-18 ===
Season 2017-18 started off with the burning desire to become the best team in India. Moving upwards on the ladder of success, the team led by Abhijai Tibrewala went onto become the defending champions at Formula Bharat 2017, bagging a total of 9 trophies with podium finishes in both static and dynamic events. The team was also awarded the Best Driver Award and a Special Award for Spirit of FSI. Further, the team also took part in FSG 2017 where it was one of the best Indian teams at the event.

==== Achievements ====
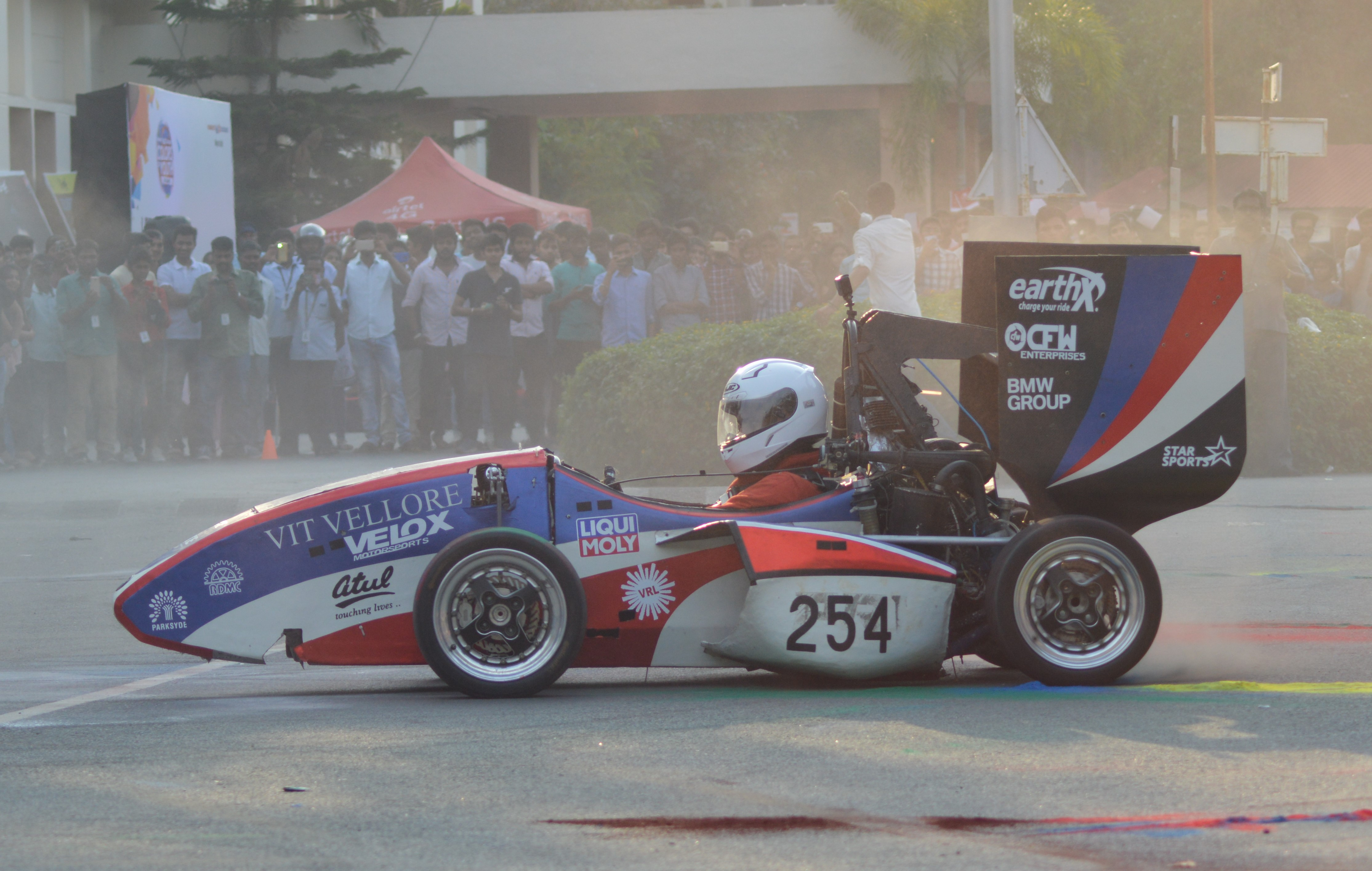
PRV17 during Riviera'17

===== Formula Bharat 2017 =====
1. 1st overall
2. 1st in Autocross
3. 1st in Acceleration
4. 1st in Cost Event
5. 1st in Business Presentation Event
6. 2nd in Skidpad
7. 2nd in Endurance
8. Special Award for Spirit of FSI
9. Best Driver Award

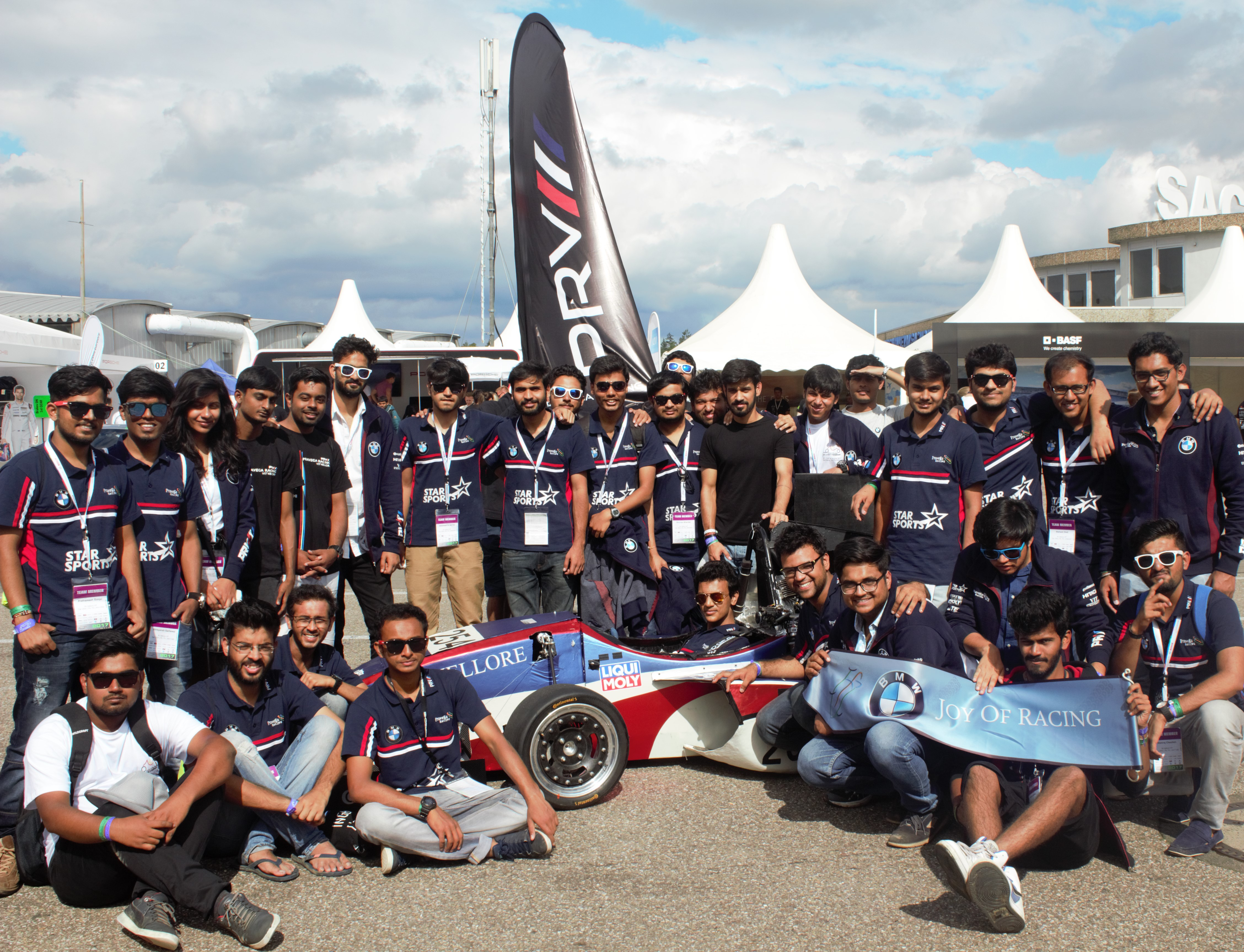
Team Members of the 2017-18 Season

===== Formula Student Germany 2017 =====
1. 18th in Business Presentation Event
2. 22nd in Cost Event
3. 55th in Design Event
4. 24th in Endurance Event

==== Technical Specifications of PRV17 ====
Car Name	PRV17
Car Number	54
Total Weight	235 kg
Wheelbase	1560 mm
Dampers	Ohlins TTX 25 Mk II 4 Way adjustable
Brakes Type	Front ISR Rear Wilwood Calipers with Custom Rotors
Chassis	Chromoly Space Frame
Suspension	Front and Rear Double Unequal Length CFRP A-arm with Push Rod actuated Spring Dampers
Wheels	Keizer 2 piece Aluminium Rims with Custom CFRP Wheel Centre, 7x13
Tires Dry	Continental C16
Tires Wet	Continental, WET
Engine	Honda CBR 600RR
Displacement	600 CC
New Feature Added	1. In-house Manufactured Aero Package including Front and Rear Wings; 2. On-Board Data Acquisition System by Autosport Labs

=== Season 2018-19 ===
With much of the experience gained over the years, in the Season 2018–19, our team went onto participate at Formula SAE Australasia 2018, where the team led by Naman Shukla and team manager Nikhil Agrawal led onto gaining the highest ever points scored by an Indian team at the Engineering Design Event. The team was also awarded the FSAE-A Encouragement Award for its exhilarating performance

==== Achievements ====
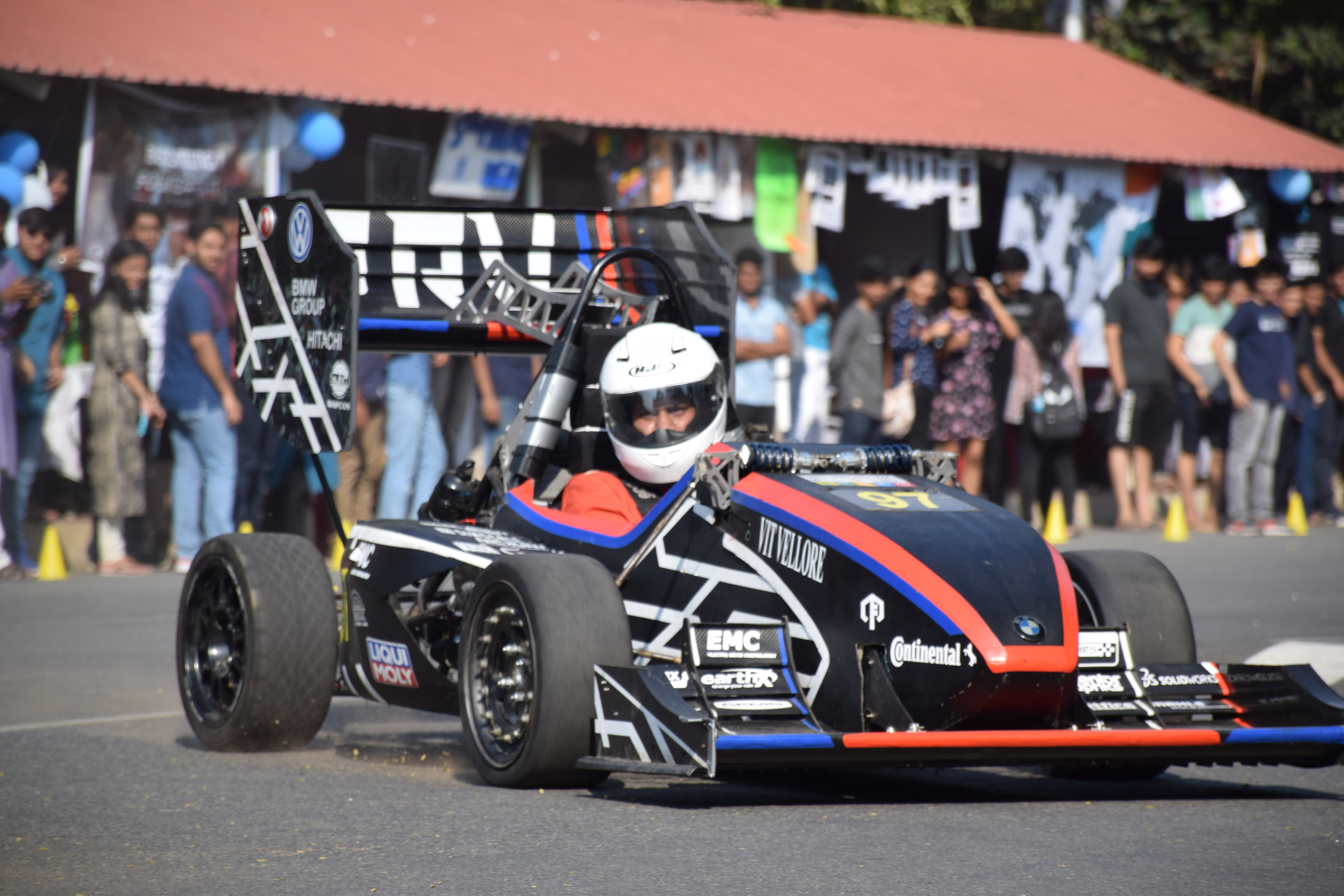
PRV18 during Riviera'18

===== Formula Student Australasia 2018 =====
1. FSAE-A Encouragement Award
2. 14th Overall
3. 4th in Engineering Design Event
4. 10th in Business Presentation Event
5. 16th in Cost & Manufacturing Event
6. 10th in Acceleration Event

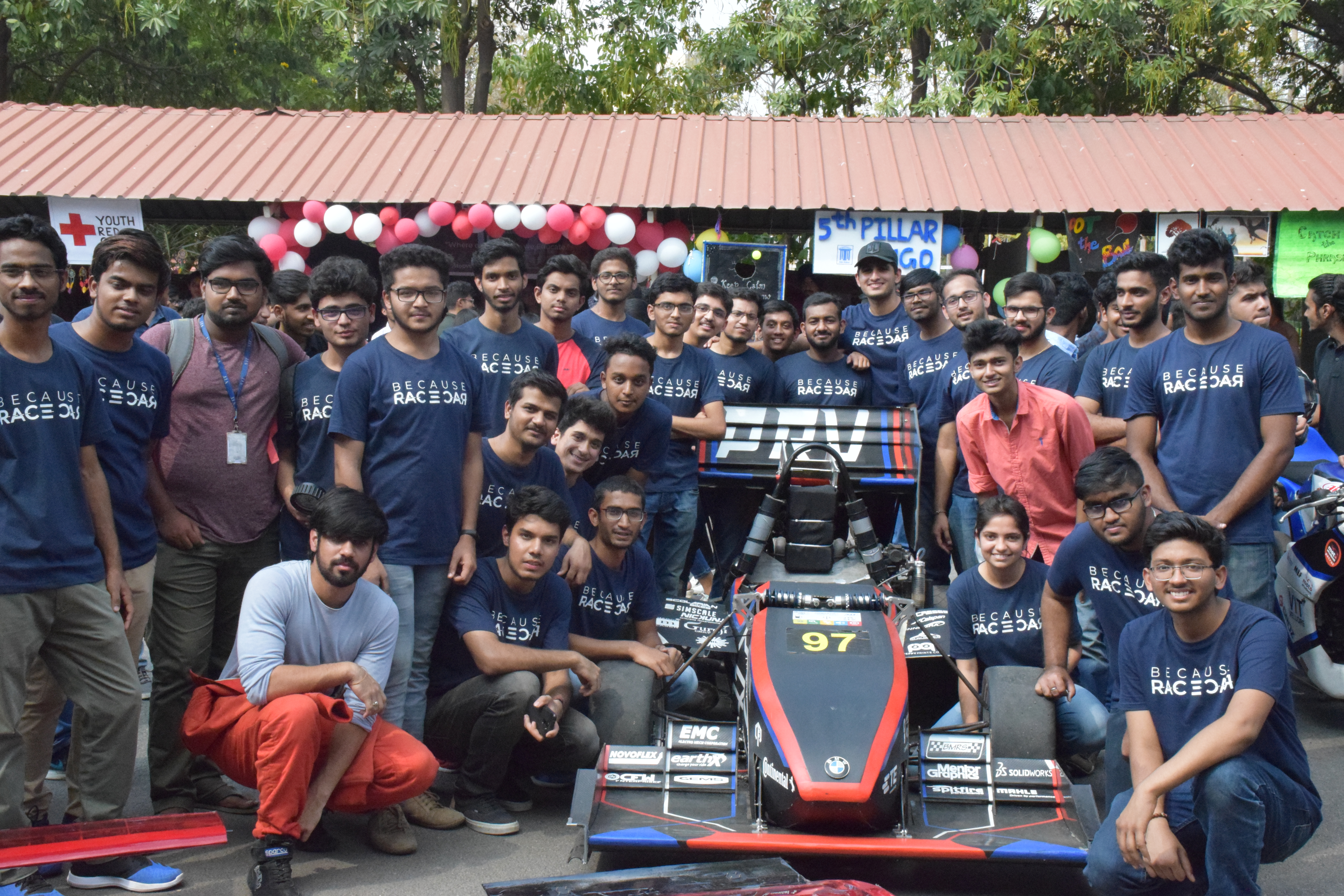
Team Members of the 2018-19 Season

==== Technical Specifications of PRV18 ====
Car Name	PRV18
Car Number	54
Total Weight	235 kg
Wheelbase	1560 mm
Dampers	Ohlins TTX 25 Mk II 4 Way adjustable
Brakes Type	Front ISR Rear Custom Calipers with Custom Rotors
Chassis	Chromoly Space Frame
Suspension	Front and Rear Double Unequal Length CFRP A-arm with Push Rod actuated Spring Dampers
Wheels	3 piece Custom CFRP Wheel Rims, 7x13
Tires Dry	Continental C16
Tires Wet	Continental, WET
Engine	Honda CBR 600RR
Displacement	600 CC
New Feature Added	In-house developed Pneumatic Shifting System with Paddle Shifters.

=== Season 2019-20 ===
Learning from its past failures, the Season 2019-20 started off with major focus on static events. The team led by Nithin Shanmugam and Akash Porwal participated at FSG 2019, where the team got its first ever international podium by winning the D-BASF Best Use of 3D Printing Award. The team was also the highest to score in the Engineering Design Event among Indian Teams.

==== Achievements ====
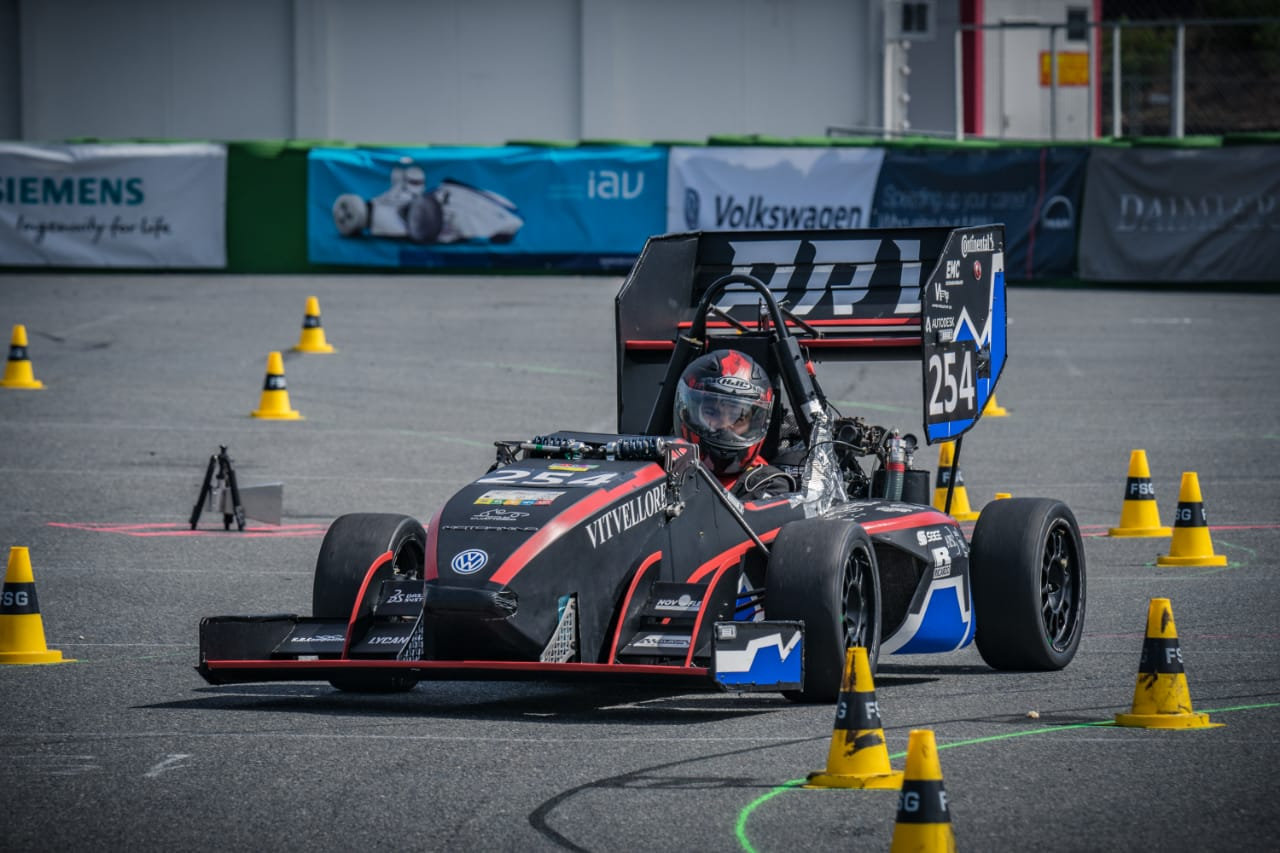
PRV19 during FSG19

===== Formula Student Germany 2019 =====
1. D-BASF Best Use of 3D Printing Award
2. 15th in Business Presentation Event
3. 15th in Design Event
4. 43rd in Cost Event
5. 35th in Skidpad Event

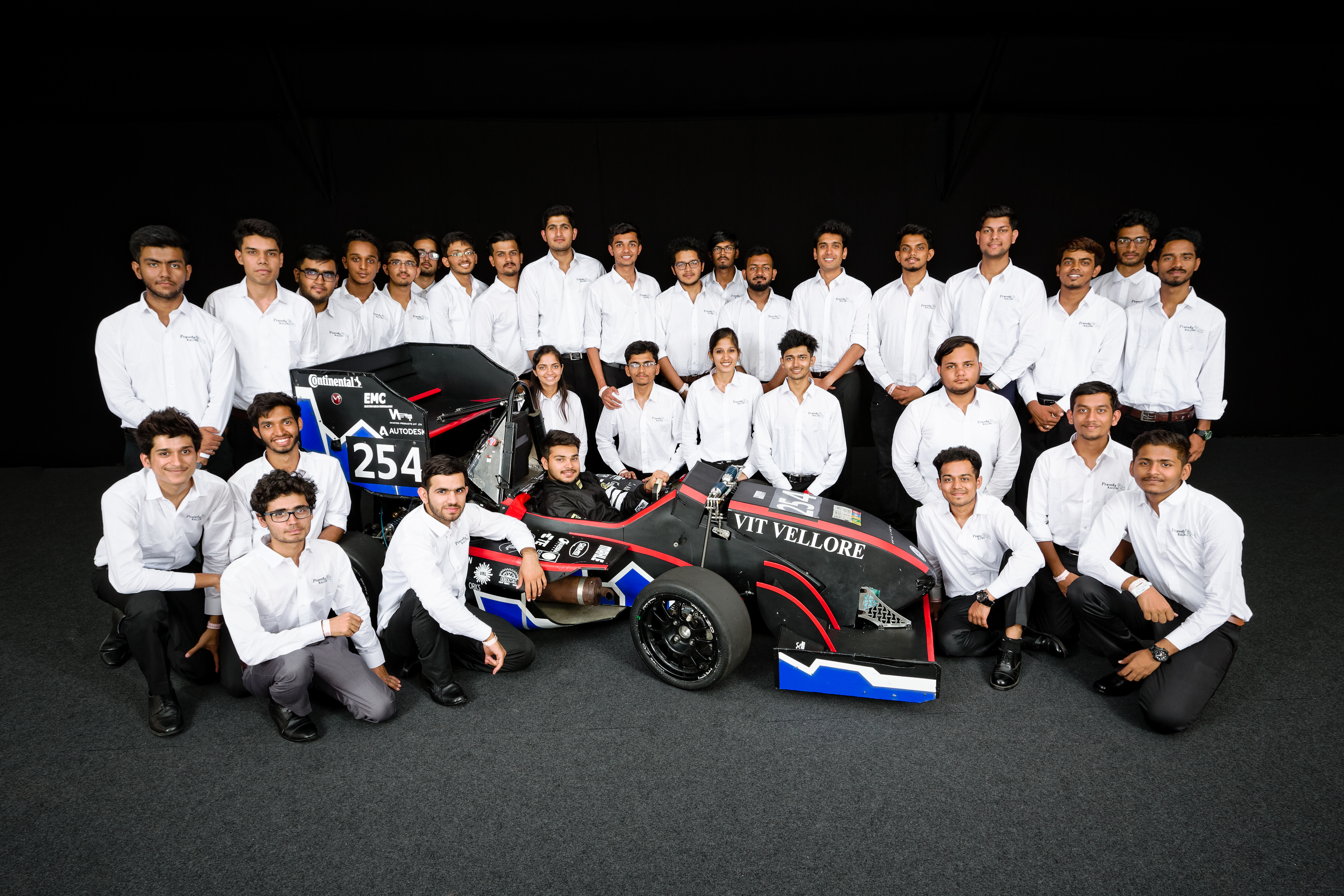
Team Members of the 2019-20 Season

==== Technical Specifications of PRV19 ====
Car Name	PRV 19
Car Number	254
Total Weight	257 kg
Wheelbase	1560 mm
Dampers	Ohlins TTX 25 Mk II 4 Way adjustable
Brakes Type	Front ISR Rear Custom Calipers with Custom Rotors
Chassis	Chromoly Space Frame
Suspension	Front and Rear Double Unequal Length CFRP A-arm with Push Rod actuated Spring Dampers
Wheels	3 piece Custom CFRP Wheel Rims, 7x13
Tires Dry	Continental C16
Tires Wet	Continental, WET
Engine	Honda CBR 600RR
Displacement	600 CC
New Feature Added	In-house developed Telemetry System

=== Season 2020-21 ===
The Season 2020-21 started off with the Formula Student Online 2020. The team led by Prudhvi Rao and Aviral HC participated at FS Online 2020, where the team came 3rd in the Business Presentation Event, 6th in Dynamic Event, 7th in Autocross Event and 11th Overall.

==== Achievements ====
===== Formula Student Online 2020 =====
1. 3rd in Business Presentation Event
2. 6th in Dynamic Event
3. 7th in Autocross Event
4. 11th Overall

==== Technical Specifications of PRV20 ====
Car Name	PRV 20
Car Number	54
Total Weight	180 kg
Wheelbase	1550 mm
Dampers	Ohlins TTX 25 Mk II 4 Way adjustable
Brakes Type	Front and Rear Custom Calipers with Custom Rotors
Chassis	Chromoly Space Frame
Suspension	Front and Rear Double Unequal Length CFRP A-arm with Push Rod actuated Spring Dampers
Wheels	2 piece custom CFRP wheel rims, 7x10
Tires Dry	Hoosier 18x7.5-10 R25B
Tires Wet	Hoosier 18x6.0-10 R25B
Engine	KTM 390
Displacement	373.3 CC
New Feature Added	In-house Manufactured Aero package including Front Wing, Rear Wing and Diffuser On-Board Data Acquisition System by Autosport Labs, In-house developed pneumatic shifting system with paddle shifters.

=== Season 2021-22 ===
The 2021–22 season started off with the Formula Bharat 2021, led by Harsh Singh and Ashwath Nagraj, the team bagged 1st in the BPP, 4th in the ED Concept and an Overall 3rd. The team then went on to compete in the FSEV, where the team secured 6th in Engineering Design, 7th in Procurement Report, 8th in FMEA Report and an Overall 10th in their first EV Concept Challenge. This was followed by the Formula Student Online 2021, where the team came 2nd in the Business Presentation Event, 3rd in Dynamic Event, 4th in Design Event and secured an Overall 3rd.

==== Achievements ====
===== Formula Bharat 2021 =====
1. 1st in Business Presentation Event
2. 4th in Engineering Design Concept
3. 3rd Overall

===== FSEV 2021 =====
1. 6th in Engineering Design Event
2. 7th in Procurement Report
3. 8th in FMEA Event
4. 10th Overall

===== Formula Student Online 2021 =====
1. 2nd in Business Presentation Event
2. 3rd in Dynamic Event
3. 4th in Design Event
4. 3rd Overall

==== Technical Specifications of PRV21 ====
Car Name	PRV 21
Car Number	54
Total Weight	180 kg
Wheelbase	1550 mm
Dampers	Ohlins TTX 25 Mk II 4 Way adjustable
Brakes Type	Front and Rear Custom Calipers with Custom Rotors
Chassis	Chromoly Space Frame
Suspension	Front and Rear Double Unequal Length CFRP A-arm with Push Rod actuated Spring Dampers
Wheels	2 piece custom CFRP wheel rims, 7x10
Tires Dry	Hoosier 18x7.5-10 R25B
Tires Wet	Hoosier 18x6.0-10 R25B
Engine	KTM 390
Displacement	373.3 CC

=== Season 2022-23 ===
This season started off with the Formula Bharat 2023, led by Chetan Pratapaneni and Shubhankar Dodkar, where the team secured 1st in Business Presentation, 2nd in Statics and an Overall 7th. The team then went on to compete in the Formula Student East 2023, where the team secured 2nd in Business Presentation, 12th in Statics and an Overall 12th. This was followed by the Formula Student Germany 2023, where the team secured 8th in Cost Analysis Event, 9th in Engineering Design Event, 10th in Business Presentation and an Overall 18th globally.

We became the only Indian team to score a podium in FS East 2023 among the 100 teams that participated from more than 30 nations and the fastest Indian Team in FSG 2023 in both Combustion and Electrical category.

==== Achievements ====
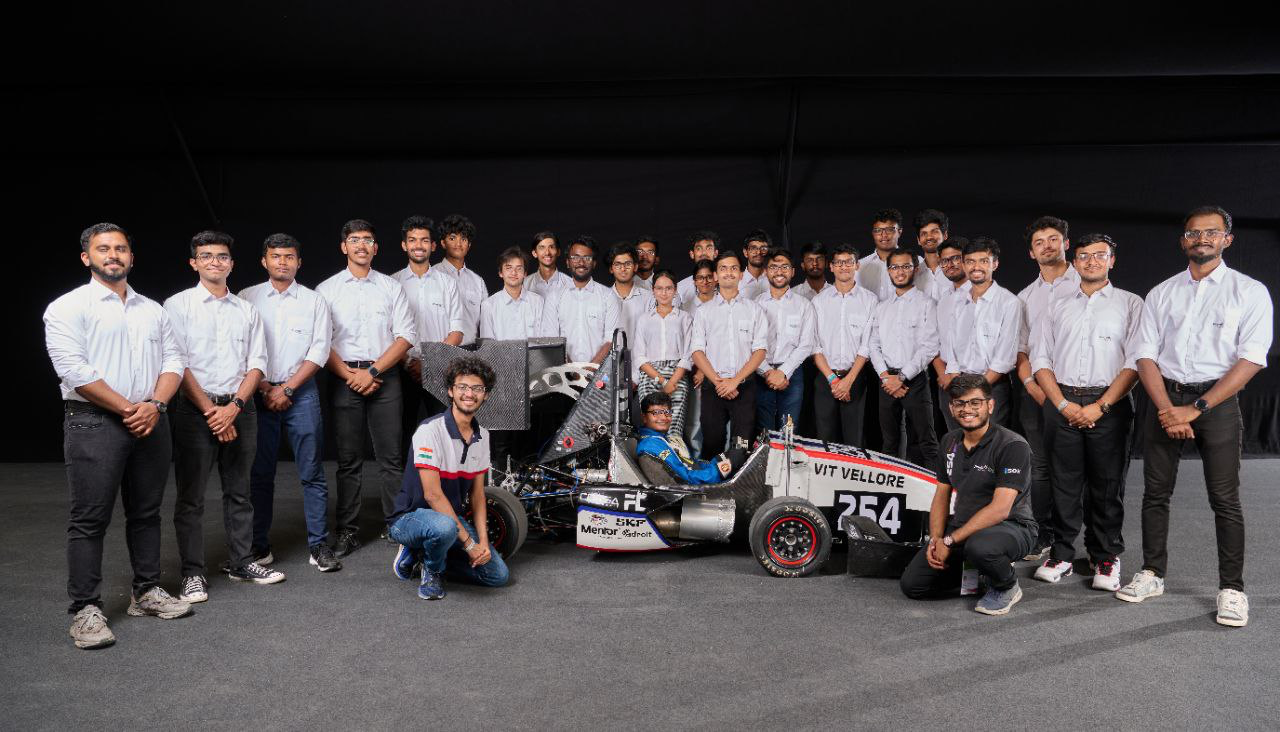

===== Formula Bharat 2023 =====
1. 1st in Business Presentation Event
2. 5th in Design Event
3. 4th in Cost Event
4. 2nd in Static Event
5. 7th Overall

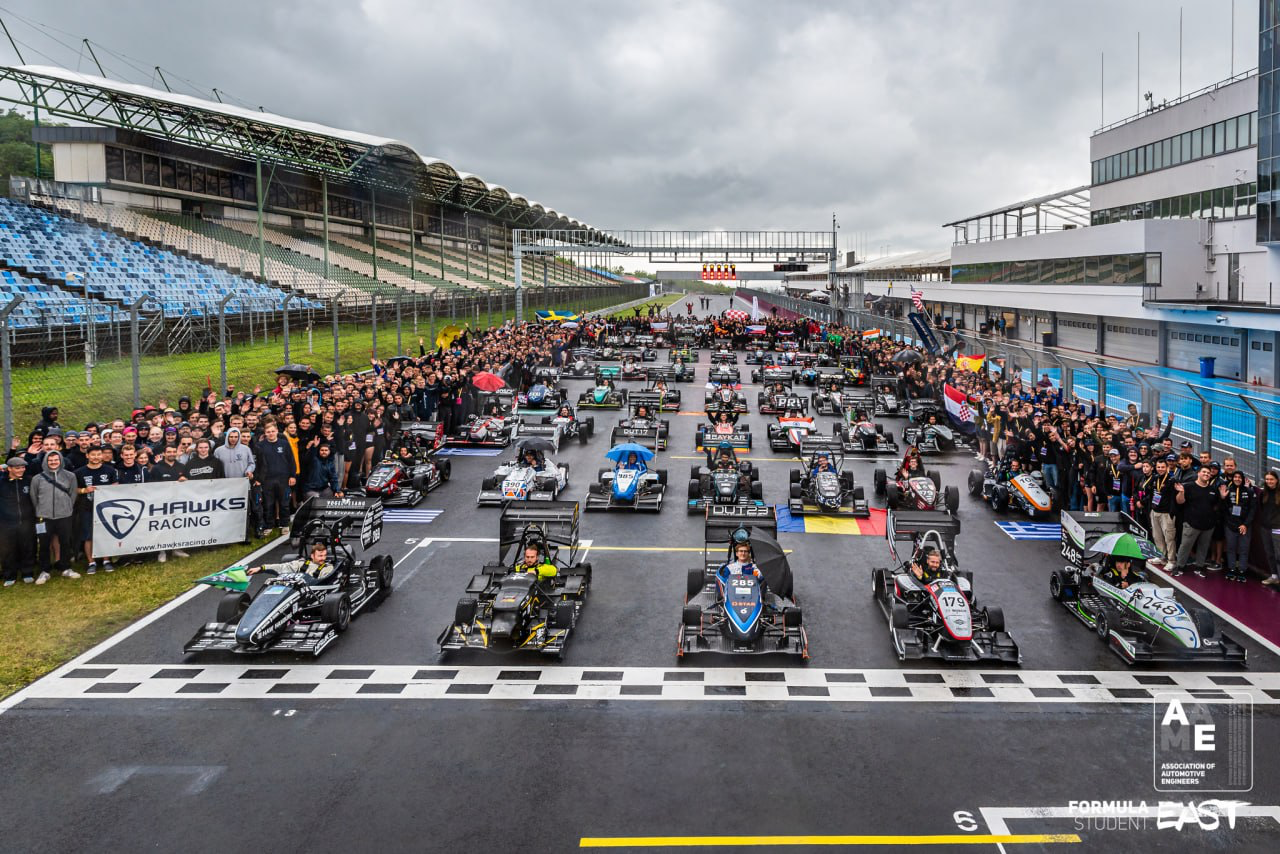

===== Formula Student East 2023 =====
1. 2nd in Business Presentation Event
2. 12th in Cost Event
3. 12th in Static Event
4. 12th Overall

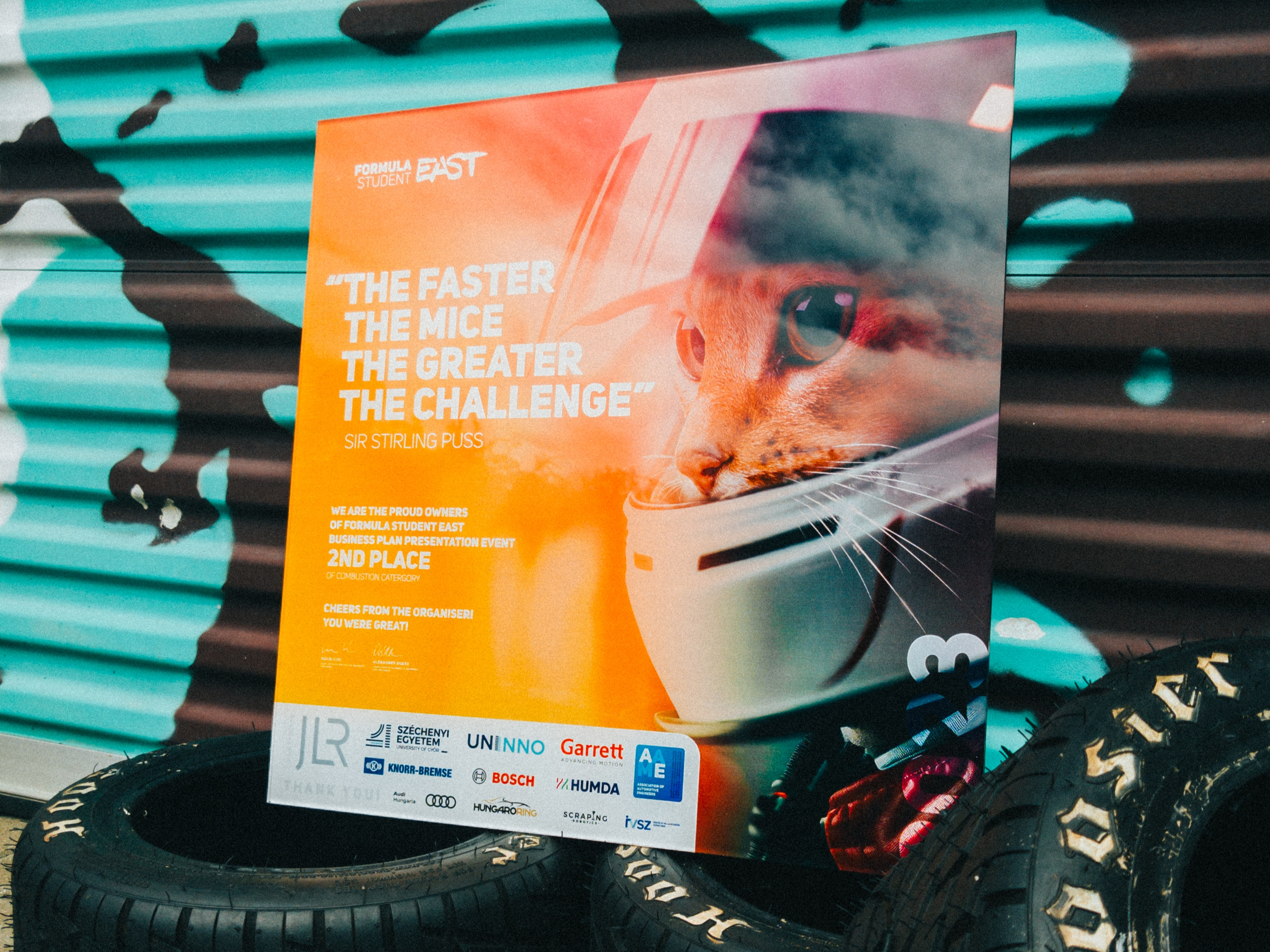

===== Formula Student Germany 2023 =====
1. 10th in Business Presentation Event
2. 9th in Design Event
3. 8th in Cost Event
4. 18th Overall

==== Technical Specifications of PRV23 ====
Car Name	PRV 23
Car Number	254
Total Weight	204.5 kg
Wheelbase	1580 mm
Dampers	Ohlins TTX 25 Mk II 4 Way adjustable
Brakes Type	Front ISR Rear Wilwood Calipers with Custom Rotors
Chassis	Chromoly Space Frame
Suspension	Front and Rear Double Unequal Length Aluminium A-arm with Push Rod actuated Spring Dampers
Wheels	3 piece Custom Aluminium Wheel Rims
Tires	Hoosier 16x7.5-10 R20
Engine	KTM 390
Displacement	373.3 CC

== Sponsors and PR Activities ==
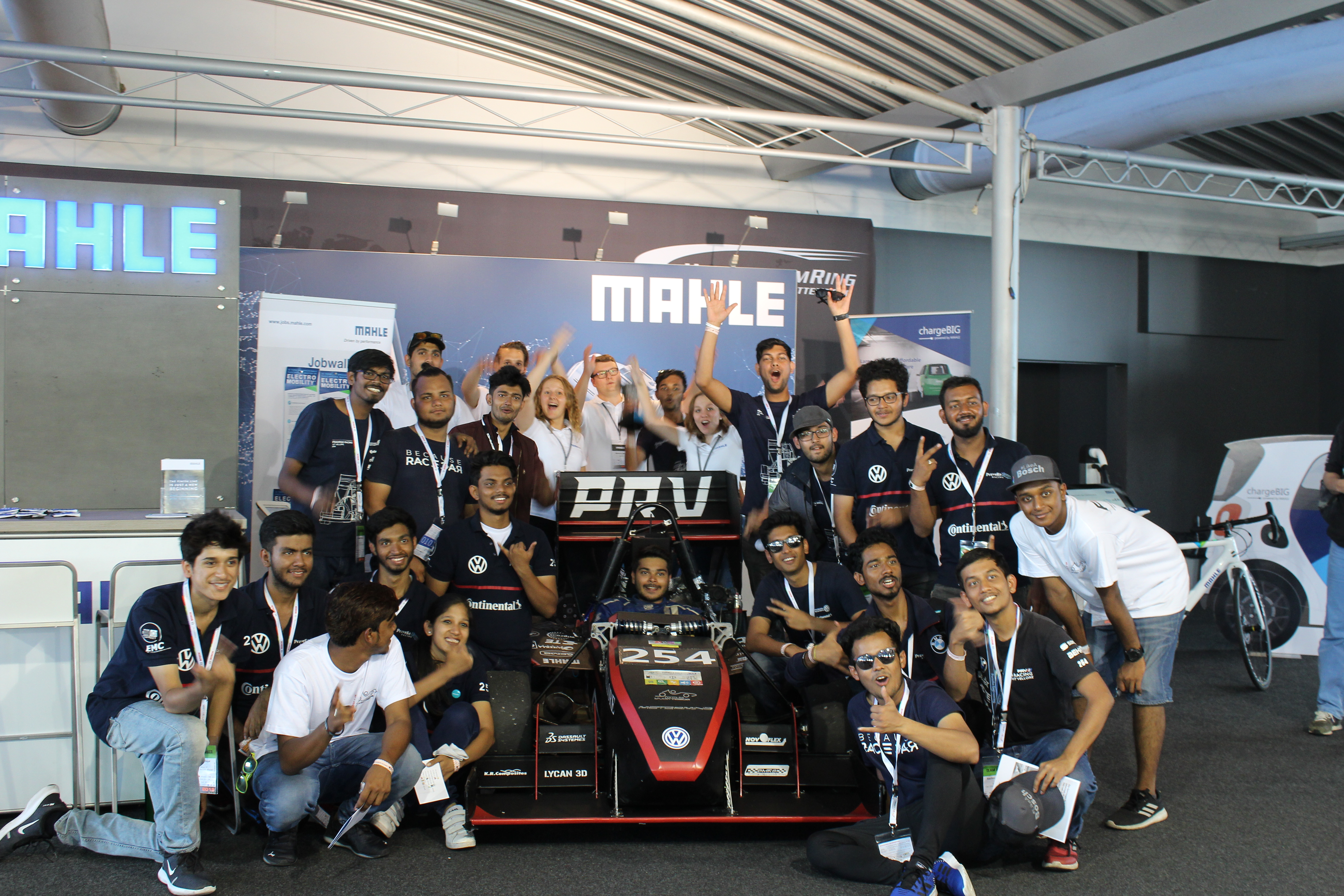
Team Photo with Mahale Sponsor at FSG19

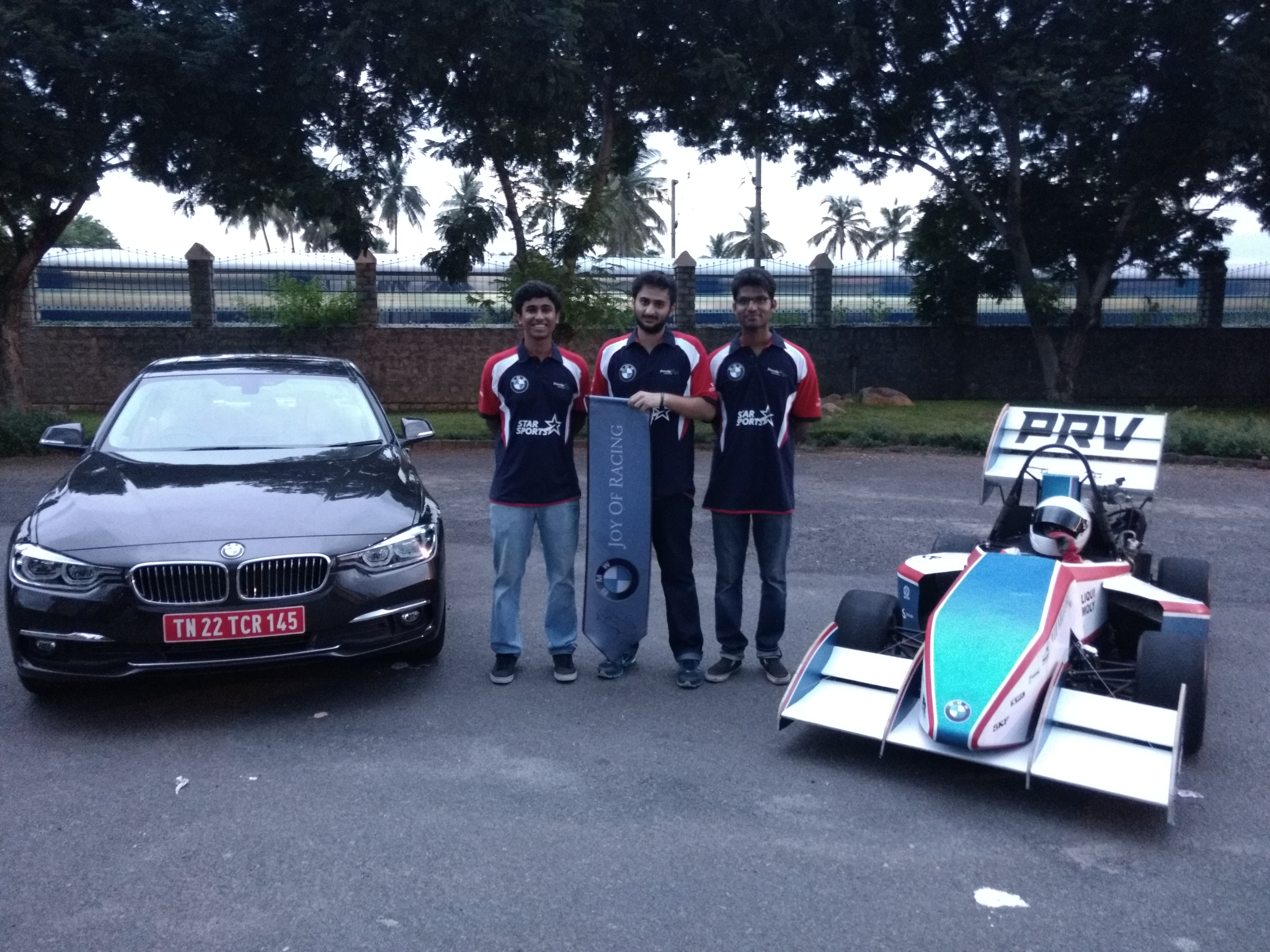
Pravega Racing Marketing Campaign with BMW

The design and manufacturing of a Formula Car is quite expensive. As a student run team, sponsors play an integral role in augmenting to the team's success and hence they make sure to maintain a cordial relation with an effective sponsorship management system. In order to meet finances, the marketing team approaches multinational companies and request for technical and monetary support. Pravega Racing currently holds sponsorship ties with major automotive companies of which Volkswagen, Continental, Autodesk, SKF and Vega who are the title sponsors of the team. Companies such as TE Connectivity, Novoflex, Mahale, Wipro and Mentor Graphics are its Gold Sponsors.

The team conducts several PR Activities for its sponsors as a token of appreciation. These include the Red Bull Calendar Shoot, Engage Deodorant Marketing Campaign, Cornitos Calendar shoot, stunt shows at the Annual College Cultural Fest, Riviera; and special sponsor appreciation during the Official Rollout of the car annually which recently included a drag race between PRV18 and Volkswagen.

The team has also partnered with PR Teams, including Wharf Street Strategies and Autoguru for several brand building campaigns and to provide superior quality media for the team presentations and showcase events. This allows the team to reach a wider audience, enhancing their scope for future sponsorship's too.
