= Vellore Institute of Technology =

University in Tamil Nadu, India

- Seal of Vellore Institute of Technology
- Other name: VIT University
- Former name: Vellore Engineering College
- Motto: "A Place to Learn, A Chance to Grow"
- Type: Private Deemed University
- Established: 1984; 42 years ago
- Founder: Dr. G. Viswanathan
- Affiliations: UGC
- Chancellor: Dr. G. Viswanathan
- Vice-Chancellor: Dr. V. S. Kanchana Bhaaskaran
- Students: 51,720 (Vellore and Chennai Campuses 2022–2023)
- Location: Vellore, Tamil Nadu, India; 12.969193°N 79.155968°E
- Campus: Vellore Campus (Main), 372 acres (151 ha) Chennai Campus, 192 acres (78 ha)
- Colors: Blue and White
- Nickname: VITians
- Website: vit.ac.in

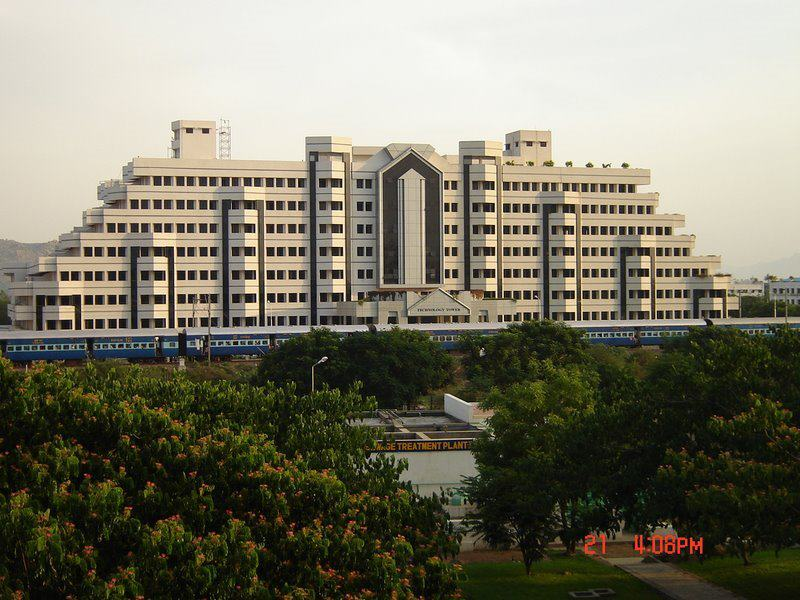
Technology Tower building.

Periyar Central Library.

Vellore Institute of Technology (VIT) is a private deemed university in Vellore, Tamil Nadu, India.

The institution offers undergraduate and postgraduate programmes. It has campuses in Vellore and Chennai and three sister universities as distinct state private universities in Amaravati, Bhopal, and Bengaluru in India, and an international campus in Mauritius.

== History ==
VIT was founded in 1984 by G. Viswanathan as a self-financing institution called Vellore Engineering College. It was later established under Section 3 of the University Grants Commission Act, 1956, and in 2001 it was granted deemed university status. In September 2006, it was renamed VIT University.

== Rankings ==
University and Institute rankings

General – international
- ARWU (2022): 601–700
- Times (World) (2023): 801–1000
- Times (Asia) (2022): 251–300
- Times (Emerging) (2022): 301–350

General – India
- NIRF (Overall) (2024): 19
- NIRF (Research) (2024): 13
- NIRF (Universities) (2024): 10

Engineering – India
- NIRF (2024): 11
- Private colleges
- Outlook India (2022): 1

Internationally, VIT was ranked 691 in the [[QS World University Rankings]] of 2026 and 150 in Asia in 2025. It was ranked 801–1000 in the world by the Times Higher Education World University Rankings of 2023, 251–300 in Asia in 2022 and 301–350 among emerging economies. It was ranked 601–700 in the Academic Ranking of World Universities of 2022.

The [[National Institutional Ranking Framework (NIRF)]] by the MoE ranked VIT 19th overall in India in 2024, 10th among universities and 11th among engineering institutes.

VIT was ranked first among private engineering colleges in India by Outlook India in 2022. India Today ranked it 20th among engineering colleges in 2020.According to the International Institutional Ranking Framework (IIRF) Rankings 2026, VIT was ranked 3rd among private and private deemed university engineering institutions in India.

== Culture ==
Riviera
Riviera is the annual international sports and cultural festival of VIT Vellore campus, held in February. The 2025 edition was reported to feature around 45,000 students from 80 universities and colleges across 26 countries. The festival includes sports tournaments, cultural competitions, pro-shows, and social-awareness events.

Vibrance
Vibrance is the annual cultural and sports festival of VIT Chennai campus, typically held in late February or early March. The four-day festival hosts students from India and abroad, with events spanning music, dance, arts, and sports.

== Controversies ==
In October 2013, two female students were suspended after they helped organize an online opinion survey of female VIT students focused on issues of safety and inequality. Commenting on the issue, VIT vice president Sekar Viswanathan said: "The students started a campaign based on the misplaced notion that the university discriminates against women, which is false. They were taken home by their parents." An American professor working at the institute at the time was reportedly dismissed after supporting the two students through a Change.org petition. According to reports citing students, university rules required male and female students to live in segregated facilities, with additional restrictions placed on female students.

In March 2024, VIT organized an athletic event intended to promote gender equality. The event drew social-media criticism after promotional materials initially indicated that men would run 10 kilometres while women would run 5 kilometres. The event poster was subsequently redesigned.

In October 2024, a 17-year-old trainee of a private technical training institute fell on a portion of the train tracks that were directly in sight of the Men's hostel of VIT Vellore campus. Students noticed the man falling off and promptly contacted concerned university authorities within the university and made calls to emergency service providers. The man lay unconscious on the tracks for 45 minutes after which he was run over by a goods train. According to anonymous student accounts VIT staff took no action on student complaints. The incident garnered much criticism on social media forums but faced less coverage in traditional media.

== Notable alumni ==
- Soumith Chintala, CTO of Thinking Machines Lab
- Papias Malimba Musafiri, Rwandan Minister of Education
- Bindu Madhavi, actress
- Anand Prakash, white hat security researcher
- Dhyan Sreenivasan, actor
- Shubhangi Swaroop, first female pilot in the Indian Navy

== See also ==
- VIT University Formula Student Team – Pravega Racing
- VIT-AP University
- VIT Bhopal University
