= Kharkhoda, Meerut =

Kharkhoda Kharkhauda
- Town
- Location within Uttar Pradesh Location within India
- Coordinates: 28.836°N 77.741°E
- Country: India
- State: Uttar Pradesh
- District: Meerut

Population (2001)
  - Total: 12,435

Languages
  - Official: Hindi
- Time zone: UTC+5:30 (IST)
- PIN: 245206
- Telephone code: 91121
- Vehicle registration: UP15

Kharkhoda is a town and a nagar panchayat in Meerut district in the Indian state of Uttar Pradesh.

== Demographics ==
As of 2001 India census, Kharkhoda had a population of 12,435. Men constituted 53% of the population and women 47%. Kharkhauda had an average literacy rate of 59%, about equal to the national average of 59.5%: male literacy was 66%, and female literacy was 48%. In Kharkhoda, 16% of the population was under 6 years of age.
