= Mohana Singh Jitarwal =

Indian aviator

Squadron Leader Mohana Singh (Jitarwal)
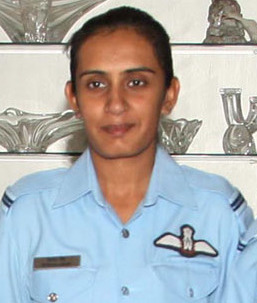
- Born: 22 January 1992 (age 34); Jhunjhunu, Rajasthan, India
- Military career
- Allegiance: India
- Service: Indian Air Force
- Service years: 2016–present
- Rank: Squadron Leader
- Unit: No. 18 Squadron
- Awards: Nari Shakti Puraskar (2020)

Squadron Leader Mohana Singh Jitarwal (born 22 January 1992) is one of the first female fighter pilots of India. She was declared as the first female combat pilot along with two of her cohort, Bhawana Kanth, and Avani Chaturvedi. All three women pilots were inducted into the Indian Air Force fighter squadron in June 2016. They were formally commissioned by Defence Minister Manohar Parrikar. After the government of India decided to open the fighter stream in India Air Force for women on an experimental basis, these three women were the first to be selected for the program.

== Biography ==
Mohana Singh completed her schooling from The Air Force School, New Delhi and BTech in Electronics & Communication from Global Institute of Management and Emerging Technologies, Amritsar, Punjab. Her father Master Warrant Officer Pratap Singh (retd) was a serving Indian Air Force personnel and mother Manju Singh is a teacher. While growing up, Singh was fond of sports like roller skating, badminton and other activities like singing and painting.

== Career ==
In June 2019, she became the first women fighter pilot of Indian Air Force to become a fully operational by day on a Hawk Mk.132 advance jet trainer at Kalaikunda Air Force Station. She had completed more than 380 hours of incident free flying on Hawk Mk.132 with training in both Air-to-Air and Air-to-Ground fighting mode in 2019.

Sing was a part of No. 3 Squadron Cobras flying the MiG-21 at NAL Air Force Station, Bikaner.

Later, she was moved to the No. 18 Squadron IAF (Flying Bullets) at Naliya Air Force Station, making her the first woman fighter pilot to fly HAL Tejas aircraft.

== Awards ==
On 9 March 2020, she was awarded with Nari Shakti Puraskar by President Ram Nath Kovind.

== See also ==
- Gunjan Saxena
- Avani Chaturvedi
- Bhawana Kanth
