= No. 3 Squadron IAF =

No. 3 Squadron Cobras
- Insignia of The No. 3 Squadron IAF "Cobras"
- Active: 1 October 1941 – 31 March 2025
- Country: British India (1941-47); India (since 1947)
- Allegiance: Indian Armed Forces
- Branch: Indian Air Force
- Role: Close Air Support; Interdiction; Reconnaissance
- Part of: Western Air Command
- Base: NAL Air Force Station
- Nickname: Cobras
- Mottos: Lakshya Vedh; Destroy Target with Precision
- Engagements: Hur's Operations NWFP; Burma Campaign; Operation Polo; Western Air War, 1965; Liberation War, 1971

Commanders
- Current commander: Group Captain Chetan Sharma
- Notable commanders: Om Prakash Mehra

Insignia
- Identification symbol: A Winged dagger clenched in a fist and entwined by a cobra

Aircraft flown
- Fighter: Mikoyan-Gurevich MiG-21 Bison

The No. 3 Squadron IAF nicknamed as Cobras was a fighter unit of the Indian Air Force (IAF) which operated as a Close Air Support (CAS) and reconnaissance unit. Previously based at NAL Air Force Station, it came under the Western Air Command, and formed the 46 wing of the IAF. It was decommissioned in 2025 following the retirement of MIG-21 from active duty.

== Crest ==
No. 3 Squadron's emblem is a winged dagger clenched in a fist and entwined by a cobra. Below this crest, the words Lakshya Vedh, literally 'on target,' are written upon a scroll.

The squadron’s famous Cobra crest has an unusual origin — it reportedly began as a light-hearted wager involving whisky and bravado at a mess night in the 1940s. Eventually formalised, the Cobra became a symbol of precision, aggression, and fearlessness, reflecting the unit's ethos during WWII and beyond.

== History ==
No. 3 Squadron (Cobras) was formed on 1 October 1941 at Peshawar equipped with Hawker Audax light bombers transferred from No. 28 Squadron RAF under the command of Sqn Ldr Nan Bray. The initial recruits to the unit were drawn from No. 1 Squadron, Indian Air Force. Tasked with the role of fighter reconnaissance, the third squadron initially operated two flights of eight Audax aircraft. The Third Squadron was first deployed in December 1941 on a mission in the North-West Frontier Province, against the insurgency of the Faqir of Ipi, in an area that is now part of Pakistan. The squadron has since flown with distinction in a number of conflicts, including the Burma Campaign, Indo-Pakistani War of 1965 and the 1971 Liberation War.

== NWFP 1942 ==
The first deployment of No. 3 Sqn was in January 1942, when the A Flight of the unit was deployed at Miranshah against the insurgency led by the Faqir of Ipi. The unit stayed there until February when it was replaced by the B Flight. The A-flight was sent to Kohat, where it remained until September. The Faqir waged a guerilla war that before and even during World War II, was a source of constant disconcert to the Raj. Added to this was the personal charisma of the Faqir. Against this enemy, No. 3, which replaced the No. 2 Sqn, was placed on what has been termed "Watch and Ward" operations and "Air Blockade", ostensibly CAS and tactical bombing. It has been suggested that the targets of these attacks were not just forces of the Faqir, but also the crops and cattle of the local populace. It was during this time in April 1942 that it received its first Indian CO, Sqn Ldr Mehar Singh. Between May and August the Unit was deployed against the Hurs in Sindh. It was also during this operation that the unit suffered its first casualty, when Plt Offr Z.B. Sanjana's Audax went down, alongside his gunner Sgt Arye during a tactical Tactical Recce Mission.

The unit converted to Hurricane IIc after moving to Risalpur in September 1943, and between November 1942 and February 1944, it moved first to Phaphamau, and then to Ranchi for Gunnery training. It was moved back to Kohat in February and briefly was deployed against the resurgent tribal people in the North Western Frontier Province. However, for most of the year of 1944, the unit remained in training at Kohat.

== Burma operations ==
3 Sqn was ordered to move to Burma in January 1945, where it was deployed in support of the second Arakan campaign. Led by Sqn Ldr Shiv Dev Singh, the unit arrived at Bawli North in January and commenced offensive flying in February 1945. In total, 493 offensive sorties were flown by the unit; there were no operational casualties. 3 Sqn flew against Japanese troop positions and communications lines around Taingup and ThinChaung. One of the highlights of the attack was on the jetty at Kwyagn, which was an unqualified success. On 13 March, the Squadron's aircraft wiped out a Japanese train south east of Thinchaung. Several missions against dug in Japanese troops were flown in the Taungap area.

At the beginning of April the Squadron was involved in road blocking sorties and in attacks on targets in the Taungup pass area with delayed action bombs. On 11 April the bridge south-east of Thin Chaung was bombed and destroyed successfully. The Squadron's stint in Burma was short, compared with the other RIAF Squadrons, but its contribution was acknowledged by the award of one DFC to Flt Lt Minoo Merwan Engineer. Also, Fg Offr Randhir Singh received a commendation for his services in combat.

3 Sqn was moved to St Thomas Mount at Madras in April and then to Risalpur in a training role in September. In October 1945, 3 Sqn was earmarked for conversion to Spitfires. Sqn Ldr Shivdev Singh handed over command to Sqn Ldr OP Mehra on 28 December 1945. In the last week of January 1946, 3 Sqn flew its Spitfires to Yelahanka to complete its conversion. Following the conversion, the unit was moved to RAF Kolar. This period was marked by a number of accidents resulting in the loss of two promising officers in Pilot Officers JM Bose and MU Haq.

In April 1946, No. 3 Squadron became the first RIAF Squadron to be equipped with the Hawker Tempest II fighter bomber. This was completed by December 1946 and command of the unit was assigned to Sqn Ldr Mohan Dev Suri in January 1947, which was followed by a move to Pune. There it remained for a considerable part of the year, giving displays over neighbouring towns and cities. Puri's command was unfortunately short-lived, however; his aircraft went down in bad weather over the Western Ghats. In a run of bad fortune, the next commanding officer, Sqn Ldr AR Pandit, also suffered severe injuries when his Tempest crashed whilst taking off on 9 December 1947. Pandit's replacement was Sqn Ldr KS Bhat, an ex Vengeance pilot from No. 7 Squadron. Accidents continued into 1948. Plt Offr Coelho was lost in a crash in July 1948. There were several other 'write-off' cases that were non-fatal. Flt Lt LRD Blunt arrived from Ambala to give dual checks to newly arrived pilots in an effort to decrease accidents.

== Hyderabad operations ==
No. 3's first post-independence commitment came to be in support of the Indian army during the annexation of Hyderabad in September 1948. Following the Transfer of Power on 15 August of that year, the Nizam had, sought to maintain i's independent status and refused to accede and sought arbitrations in the UN and political (and possibly military) help from Pakistan. With military intervention imminent, No. 3 flew from Poona on a number of reconnaissance sorties over the State of Hyderabad. After the launch of Operation Polo, No. 3, along with No. 4 Squadron flying from Gannavaram, became involved in close air support to the advancing Indian troops. The unit also flew strafing missions against the airfield at Hakimpet and later strafed a parade of Razakars at Gulbarga. The operations were however essentially small scale.

The unit continued operating its Tempests from Pune after the annexation of Hyderabad, but following a spate of accidents in the following years, the unit was re-equipped first with Vampire FB 52s in December 1952 and then with Dassault Ouragans in February 1954. The unit regularly played a part in the spectacle of Republic Day parades, and in ceremonial occasions, such as the Passing out Parade of Dehradun. In December 1954, No. 3 escorted the aircraft carrying Marshal Josip Broz Tito of Yugoslavia. The unit had, by this time, moved to Jamnagar for armament training.

In January 1956, Flt Lt Jagat Lowe carried out the first crash-landing of an Ouragan when his nosewheel failed to lock on. In May 1958, the unit replaced its Ouragans with Dassault Mystères soon after its move to Kalaikunda AB. In May, 57 Sqn Ldr Bose had taken over as the CO of the unit. A batch of six pilots were sent to France for training. Conversion training finished by June but not before the squadron got the dubious honour of having the first Mystère ejection in the IAF: Fg Offr Sahni ejected during a training flight. A year later, there was another fatality, as Flt Lt C S Raj died when his Mystère crashed during a low level sortie.

No. 3 did not participate in operations in Goa or during the Sino-Indian War. It was left out on standby at Kalaikunda, but never really got called into action.

== The Indo-Pakistani War of 1965 ==
No. 3 was put on standby when the initial skirmishes broke out in the Rann of Kutch, and remained on alert through August with the pilots flying on regular training and recce sorties. The unit had been assigned a new CO, Wg Cdr Paul Robey, in April. The first offensive sorties were undertaken on the evening of 1 September, when No. 3, along with Squadron No. 31, flew 16 sorties in 45 minutes against Pakistani Armour at Chamb. The first missions were launched immediately following a strike mission by a Vampire flight of the No. 45 Squadron that went disastrously wrong. The PAF, which had provided air cover against the earlier disastrous mission undertaken by the Vampires, chose not to provide opposition and before the end of the day, the Pakistani offensive had been blunted.

No.3 continued to provide ground support in these initial days of the conflict, which was shaping up even before the formal breach of the IB. On 3 September, Cobras flew as part of a larger formation in what came to be the first of the sabre baiting missions. Flying at dawn from Pathankot towards Chhamb, the Mystères lured out a roving CAP of six Sabres and two Starfighters. Attempting to intercept the Mystères, the interceptors themselves flew into the trap set by the Gnats of No. 23 Sqn. The ensuing battle claimed the first of IAF's jet-to-jet kills, when Sqn. Ldr. Trevor Keelor shot down one of the intercepting Sabres with cannon fire. The next day was to see a repeat of the story, when Flt Lt V S Pathania, escorting a four ship mission from No. 3, shot down a Sabre over the town of Akhnur.

Throughout the following two days, No. 3 flew a number of sorties against targets of opportunity. Though on 6 September, No. 3 faced a dusk raid on Pathankot by the PAF, which destroyed four of its Mystères on the ground, along with two Mystères from the No. 31 Squadron, two MiG-21s from No. 28 Squadron, a Gnat and a Fairchild C-119. The strike, led by Sqd Ldr Sajad Haider, was carried out by an eight-ship mission of Sabres of the PAF's No. 19 Sqn flying from Peshawar. The war of the bases had begun.

In the retaliatory air strike that followed the next day, No. 3 was assigned on strikes against the Pakistani airfields of Chander and Rahwali. The first of these strikes, a three ship mission led by Sqn Ldr Jasbir Singh, found the airfields at Chander and Rahwali abandoned. Nonetheless, the mission took out a Pakistani radar installation operating at Rahwali. Tragically, Singh's Mystere crashed into the ground during the return leg, killing the officer.

A change of command occurred midway, as Wg Cdr S Bhattacharya took over from Paul Robey, who had fallen sick.

No. 3 Sqn continued interdiction and CAS missions throughout the remainder of the war. The unit successfully flew in interdiction against Pakistani Armour in the Chawinda area, destroying a sizeable enemy concentration on 19 September.

During the last mission of the war, on 22 December, Fg offr Ramchandani's Mystere was shot down in friendly fire near Lahore. Although ejected safely, he was fired upon while descending by parachute. Ramchandani sustained injuries and died in the hospital on 26 September.

Throughout the war, No. 3 Squadron put in 290 sorties in twenty two days. The unit lost two Mystères and two pilots in operational accidents: Sqd Ldr Jasbir Singh died when he flew into the ground, and Fg Offr Ramchandani was killed by friendly fire. Four Mystères were lost on the ground to the PAF air raid at Pathankot in the opening stages of the war. The unit did not suffer any losses in air-to-air combat.

The No. 3 Sqn's efforts were recognized by the award of Four VrCs, one of which was awarded posthumously to Sqn Ldr Jasbir Singh, for the strike against Rahwali Radar station.

== Bangladesh War, 1971 ==
At the outbreak of the war, No. 3 Sqn was tasked with interdiction, ground support and reconnaissance roles in support of IX Corps in the Fazilka and Suleimanke areas of the Kashmir and Chhamb Sector under the Western Air Command.

The unit had moved to Hindon Airbase in July 1971, and was still operating Mystère IVAs. At the start of the war, the Cobras were moved to Sirsa and subsequently to Hindon/Halwara The first of the missions was undertaken on 5 December, two days after the formal declaration of war. Flying in interdiction against targets in the Christian Mandi area, the Cobras destroyed a fuel train in their first strike. Over the following days, the Cobras hit troop and armour concentrations and ammunition dumps in the Haveli Pattan and Fazilka Suleimanke area. In interdictions against secondary targets, the Cobras also hit and destroyed entire railway yards, tank transport train and rail bridges. The Cobras' role in these missions are judged to be one of the main reasons for the failure of the Pakistani Strike Corps to launch their attack on India.

During these missions, No. 3 Sqn lost two machines, one due to engine failure in the initial stages of the war, the other to ground fire when Sqn Ldr JD Kumar's Mystere was hit by AA during a photorecce sortie over the Fazilka on 13 December. The pilot was killed in an unsuccessful ejection.

The Squadron received two Vir Chakra awards: one went to CO Wg Cdr Dogra; the other went to Sqn Ldr Jasjit Singh. The unit also won one Mention-in-Dispatches and five CAS commendations.

== Present ==
No. 3 Sqn moved back to Hindon Airbase after the war and in January 1972 started converting to the Mig 21FL and completed conversion in April of the year. It moved back from Hindon to Pathankot in 1975, and on 18 March, No. 3 Squadron became only the third Squadron in the IAF's history to receive Squadron Standards.

In July 1980, the MiG-21FLs were exchanged for the MiG-21Bis and conversion was completed October of the year. In 2002, the unit converted to the Mig 21 Bison which are currently in operation. The Cobras celebrated their Diamond Jubilee in October 2002.

In May 2019, it became the first squadron to host a fully commissioned women fighter pilot Bhawana Kanth of the Indian Air Force.

The squadron moved to the NAL Air Force Station in Bikaner at an unspecified date. The squadron will be equipped with newer Tejas Mk1A.

== Aircraft ==
Aircraft	From	To	Air Base
Pre-Independence (1941–47)
Hawker Audax	1 October 1941	October 1943	Peshawar
Hawker Hurricane IIC	December 1943	December 1945	Risalpur
Harvard IIB	October 1945	September 1947	Risalpur
Spitfire VIII	November 1945	January 1947	Risalpur
Post-Independence (1947–Present)
Hawker Tempest II	October 1946	December 1952	AFS Pune
Vampire FB52	January 1953	March 1954	
Dassault Ouragan	May 1954	May 1958	
Dassault Mystère IV	July 1958	August 1963	AFS Kalaikunda
Dassault Mystère IV	September 1963	March 1972	AFS Pathankot
MiG-21 FL	April 1972	July 1980	AFS Pathankot
MiG-21 bis	1 October 1980	July 2002	AFS Pathankot
MiG-21 Bison	August 2002	—N/a	AFS Pathankot
MiG-21 Bison	—N/a	31 March 2025	AFS NAL

== See also ==
- First Kashmir War
- Kargil War
- Operation Safed Sagar
