= Shubhangi Swaroop =

Indian Navy

Lt Cdr. Shubhangi Swaroop
- Born: 17 January 1995 (age 31); Tilhar, Uttar Pradesh
- Military career
- Allegiance: India
- Branch: Indian Navy Executive (Pilot)
- Service years: 2017–present
- Rank: Lieutenant Commander in Indian Navy

Lt Cdr. Shubhangi Swaroop (born 17 January 1995) in Tilhar Uttar Pradesh is the first female pilot of the Indian Navy. She is a pilot of Maritime reconnaissance aircraft in Indian Navy.

== Career ==
Lt. Shubhangi has been part of the first batch of female officers to graduate from the Indian Naval Academy, Ezhimala, Kannur in 2017.

She holds degree in Biotechnology Engineering from Vellore Institute of Technology in Tamil Nadu and took training from Air Force Academy (India) in Hyderabad. She is also a national taekwondo champion. She is one amongst the Indian Navy's first batch of three women pilots for Maritime Reconnaissance (MR) missions on Dornier aircraft.

She hails from Tilhar, Uttar Pradesh, India. Her father Cdr. Gyan Swaroop is a naval officer and her mother Mrs.Kalpana Swaroop is a teacher at Navy Children School, Karwar.
