= Air Force Common Admission Test =

Enlistment test for the Indian Air Force

- Administrator: Indian Air Force
- Year started: 2012 (14 years ago)
- Duration: 2 hours
- Offered: Twice a year
- Restrictions on attempts: Unlimited
- Regions: India
- Languages: English
- Fee: ₹649/-
- Website: afcat.edcil.co.in

The Air Force Common Admission Test is conducted by the Air Force Selection Board for recruitment of ground and flying staff of the Indian Air Force (IAF). The Air Force Selection Board is the recruitment wing of the Indian Air Force.

== Objective ==
Air Force Common Admission Test is conducted by Air Force selection Board for recruitment of ground staff and flying branches of the Indian Air Force (IAF). Qualified applicants in the test are mandated to register for the five day Air Force Selection Board process.

Air Force Common Admission Test (AFCAT) is conducted in two stages. The first stage consists of a written test, and the second stage involves a testing process. After this, qualified candidates will get offer letters, and they should report to any one of the selection boards in Dehradun, Mysuru, Gandhinagar, Varanasi, or Guwahati.

== Eligibility ==
Admission Conditions and Eligibility

1. Candidates must meet all eligibility criteria. Admission is provisional. Ineligibility at any point will result in cancellation by the IAF.
2. Admit Card/Call Up Letter issuance does not guarantee acceptance by the IAF. Required qualifications for Flying and Ground Staff positions are:

Eligibility Conditions

1. Nationality: Indian citizen.
2. Age:
  - Flying Branch: 20–24 years (up to 26 with a valid Commercial Pilot License).
  - Ground Duty: 20–26 years as of 1 July 2023.
3. Marital Status:
  - Below 25 years: Must be single.
  - Marriage after application or during training results in disqualification and refund of training costs.
  - Above 25 years: Married candidates can apply, but won't receive married accommodation or live with family during training.
4. Date of Birth Verification: Must match the Matriculation or equivalent certificate. Other documents will not be accepted.

=== Flying Branch ===
The following outlines the eligibility criteria for applying for the AFCAT to secure a selection into the Flying Branch of the Indian Air Force.

(i) Flying Branch. Candidates should have passed with a minimum of 50% marks each in Maths and Physics at the 10+2 level and

(a) Graduation with a minimum of a three-year degree course in any discipline from a recognized university with a minimum of 60% marks or equivalent. OR

(b) BE/B Tech degree (Four-year course) from a recognized University with a minimum of 60% marks or equivalent. OR

(c) Candidates who have cleared the Section A & B examination of Associate Membership of the Institution of Engineers (India) or Aeronautical Society of India from a recognized University with a minimum of 60% marks or equivalent.

=== Ground Duty (Technical) Branch ===
The following outlines the eligibility criteria for applying for the AFCAT to secure a selection into the Ground Duty (Technical) Branch of the Indian Air Force.

(aa) Aeronautical Engineer (Electronics) {AE (L)}.

Candidates with a minimum of 50% marks each in Physics and Mathematics at the 10+2 level and a minimum of four years' degree graduation/integrated post-graduation qualification in Engineering/ Technology from a recognized University. OR cleared Sections A and B examination of Associate Membership of Institution of Engineers (India), Aeronautical Society of India, or Graduate membership examination of the Institution of Electronics and Telecommunication Engineers by actual studies with a minimum of 60% marks or equivalent in the following disciplines: -

(aaa) Applied Electronics & Instrumentation.

(aab) Communication Engineering.

(aac) Computer Engineering/Technology.

(aad) Computer Engineering & Application.

(aae) Computer Science and Engineering/Technology.

(aaf) Electrical and Computer Engineering.

(aag) Electrical and Electronics Engineering.

(aah) Electrical Engineering.

(aaj) Electronics Engineering/ Technology.

(aak) Electronics Science and Engineering.

(aal) Electronics.

(aam) Electronics and Communication Engineering.

(aan) Electronics and Computer Science.

(aao) Electronics and/or Telecommunication Engineering.

(aap) Electronics and/or Telecommunication Engineering (Microwave).

(aaq) Electronics and Computer Engineering.

(aar) Electronics, Communication, and Instrumentation Engineering.

(aas) Electronics Instrument & Control.

(aat) Electronics Instrument & Control Engineering.

(aau) Instrumentation & Control Engineering.

(aav) Instrument & Control Engineering.

(aaw) Information Technology.

(aax) Spacecraft Technology.

(aay) Engineering Physics.

(aaz) Electric Power and Machinery Engineering.

(aba) Infotech Engineering.'

(abb) Cyber Security.

(ab) Aeronautical Engineer (Mechanical) {AE (M)}. Candidates with a minimum of 50% marks each in Physics and Mathematics at 10+2 level and a minimum of four years' degree graduation/integrated post-graduation qualification in Engineering/Technology from a recognized University

OR cleared Sections A & B examination of Associate Membership of Institution of Engineers (India) or Aeronautical Society of India by actual studies with a minimum of 60% marks or equivalent in the following disciplines:-

(aaa) Aerospace Engineering.

(aab) Aeronautical Engineering.

(aac) Aircraft Maintenance Engineering.

(aad) Mechanical Engineering.

(aae) Mechanical Engineering and Automation.

(aaf) Mechanical Engineering (Production).

(aag) Mechanical Engineering (Repair and Maintenance).

(aah) Mechatronics.

(aaj) Industrial Engineering.

(aak) Manufacturing Engineering.

(aal) Production and Industrial Engineering.

(aam) Materials Science and Engineering.

(aan) Metallurgical and Materials Engineering.

(aao) Aerospace and Applied Mechanics.

(aap) Automotive Engineering.

(aaq) Robotics

(aar) Nanotechnology

(aas) Rubber Technology and Rubber Engineering.

=== Ground Duty (Non-Technical) Branches ===
The following outlines the eligibility criteria for applying for the AFCAT to secure a selection into the Ground Duty (Non-Technical) Branches of the Indian Air Force.

Administration Division

The applicant should have

- Passed 10+2 and
- Graduation course having a minimum three-year degree course from a recognized university in any subject and secured 60% minimum marks or more.

Or cleared department of Associate Membership of The Institution of Engineers (India) in sections A & B, or from a recognized university recognized by the Aeronautical Society of India with 60% minimum marks or above.

Education Division

Applicant should

- Have passed 10+2 and
- 60% marks in Graduation in any discipline.
- Postgraduate degree in any discipline with 50% marks, which may include integrated courses offered in post-graduation (with a single degree with no permission to exit and lateral entry).

Meteorology Division

- Passed 10+2 and
- Has done a Postgraduate Degree with 50% minimum marks in all papers combined in the stream having Agricultural Meteorology/Science/Geo-physics/Oceanography/Statistics/ Mathematics/ Geography/Computer Applications/ Applied Physics/ Meteorology/ Ecology & Environment/ Environmental Biology/Environmental Science (had Math and Physics as subjects at Graduation Level securing 55% minimum marks in each).
- Age Limit- Applicant should be in the age group of 20–26 years on the date of application.

== Selection Process ==
=== Physical fitness for Air Force Selection Board ===
Applicants should have the ability to do ten push-ups, run a distance of 1.6 kilometers in 10 minutes, and perform 3 chin-ups.

The testing process of the Air Force Selection Board consists of two stages:

Step 1 Testing:

(i) Test for Officer Intelligence Rating (OIR)

Non-Verbal and Verbal reasoning of a candidate is done through the test of OIR, which also helps in evaluating the intelligence and competence of the applicant.

– Applicant is required to solve the mock test containing 40-50 questions in 10–20 minutes.

– The question paper will involve embedded figures, questions on completion of series, having odd figures to set, and other topics on reasoning.

– Suggested to attempt maximum questions in the absence of negative marking.

– Suggested to avoid extra time in case of doubtful and confusing questions.

(ii) Picture Perception Discussion Test

The test involves picture viewing for 30 seconds, noting down details in 1 minute, and short paragraph writing on random topics for 4 minutes, and finally, the applicants should attend a group discussion and collate information in narration to make a story.

– Every portion of the picture should be focused on for 30 seconds, as it helps in evaluating the speed and coordination of the applicant.

– Recommended to include all aspects during story writing, avoiding technical and complex language.

– Using short forms like Male(M)/female(F)/person(P) and + for positive,- for Negative 0 for neutral for filling forms.

– Be calm, composed, and confident, and gain attention during a simultaneous group discussion of applicants.

Step 2 Testing:

(i) Psychological ability test

To ascertain the sound mental ability and medical condition of the applicants Air Force Selection Board conducts the test for determining the psychological ability of the applicants on the first day, and later, document verification is done. It is followed by group tests and an interview, which lasts for a period of five days.

(ii) Group Discussion and Interview

– Awareness of the applicant on the reason behind applying for AFCAT, and the reason behind choosing the career in the Indian Air Force.

– Up-to-date information on current affairs and historical facts relating to the Indian Air Force.

– Promptness and honesty in answering the questions during the interview.

– Enhancing interview skills based on previous questions asked.

(iii) Computerized Pilot Selection System (CPSS)

For applicants of the flying branch.

– Requirements of promptness and attention to solve MCQs.

– Practicing with a timer on sample MCQs.

– Suggested for a good sleep before the test.

– Familiarity with using a joystick, well-versed with computer games basics, as maneuvering skills are improved.

The next step is a medical examination of the candidate, completing both stages of the test. All India merit list of the successful applicants will be generated based on the outcome of the tests after the vacancies in all branches are filled. The results of the candidate are displayed in the AFCAT candidate login portal.

== Examination Fee and Procedure ==
An amount of ₹ 550/- as an application fee is charged from the AFCAT applicants and can be paid either through net banking, credit, debit card, or any of the payment gateways. Applicants are suggested to follow the instructions, guidance, or steps in the gateway, and keep the transaction details in either printed or digital form. Examination is conducted in February and August of each year.

== Related Links ==
- Indian Air Force
