= Avani Chaturvedi =

India's first women combat pilot

Squadron Leader Avani Chaturvedi
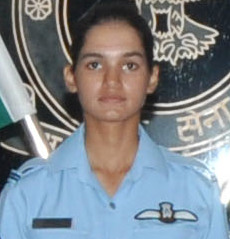
- Born: 27 October 1993 (age 32); Satna, Madhya Pradesh, India
- Spouse: Flt Lt Vineet Chikara
- Military career
- Allegiance: India
- Service: Indian Air Force
- Service years: 2016–present
- Rank: Squadron Leader
- Unit: No. 23 Squadron
- Awards: Nari Shakti Puraskar (2020)

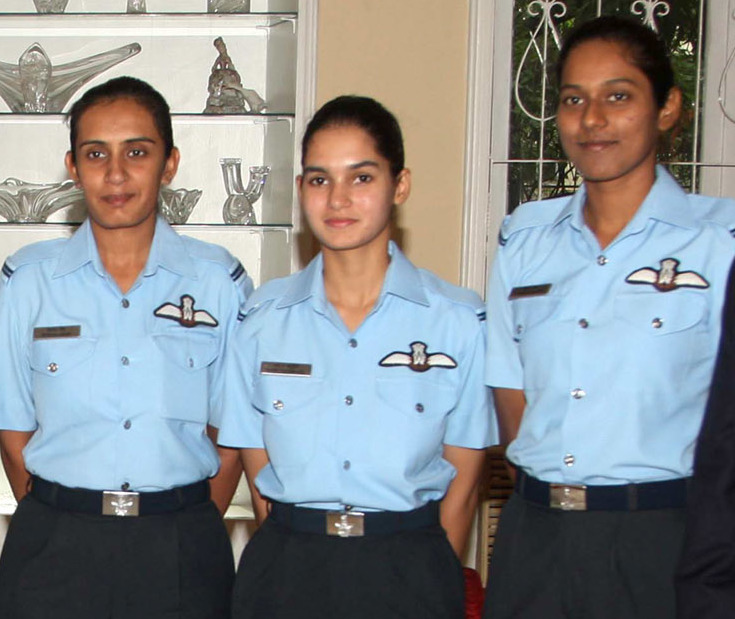
(L-R) Mohana Singh Jitarwal, Avani Chaturvedi and Bhawana Kanth

Squadron Leader Avani Chaturvedi (born 27 October 1993) is an Indian pilot from Rewa district, Madhya Pradesh. She was declared as the first female combat pilot in India along with two of her cohorts, Mohana Singh Jitarwal, and Bhawana Kanth. The trio was inducted into the Indian Air Force fighter squadron in June 2016. They were formally commissioned by then Defence Minister Manohar Parrikar on 18 June 2016, to serve the nation.

The Indian Government had decided to open the fighter stream for women in October 2015.

Chaturvedi’s achievement has put India on the list of the countries, such as Britain, the United States, Israel, where women are allowed to fly fighter jets.

== Early life and education ==
Avani was born on 27 October in 1993. Her father, Dinkar Chaturvedi, is a superintending engineer in Water Resource Department of Madhya Pradesh government and her mother is a home maker. She completed her schooling from Deolond, a small town in Shahdol district of Madhya Pradesh. Completing her Bachelors in Technology from Banasthali University, Rajasthan in 2014 where she joined the college's flying club which fascinated her to fly. She passed the AFCAT (Air Force Common Admission Test) and further was recommended by AFSB.

Chaturvedi likes to play chess, table tennis and to do sketching and painting.

Avani's elder brother, who is an officer in the Indian Army, inspired her to join the Indian Air Force. She also has a few hours of flying experience in the flying club of her college Banasthali University.

== Career ==
She was selected for training at the Air Force Academy and completed the training at the age of 25. After further training, Chaturvedi became a fighter pilot in June 2016. After commissioning, her first posting was at AFS Bidar where she flew the Hawk Advanced Jet Trainer.

In 2018, Chaturvedi became the first Indian woman pilot to take a solo flight in a MiG-21. In 2018 Avani was promoted to the rank of Flight Lieutenant. In 2023, she became the first woman fighter pilot of the Indian Air Force to take part in an aerial wargame abroad, which she did in Japan.

Chaturvedi is posted in Indian Air Force No. 23 Squadron Panthers in Suratgarh, Rajasthan.

== Awards and recognition ==
In 2018, she was honored with the doctorate degree from Banasthali Vidyapeeth.

On 9 March 2020, Chaturvedi was awarded with Nari Shakti Puraskar by President Ram Nath Kovind.

== Personal life ==
Avani Chaturvedi married Flight Lieutenant Vineet Chikara in November 2019.

== See also ==
- Gunjan Saxena
- Mohana Singh Jitarwal
- Bhawana Kanth
