= Bikaner Airport =

Airport of Rajasthan, India

- IATA: BKB; ICAO: VIBK

Summary
- Airport type: Military/Public
- Operator: Indian Air Force
- Serves: Bikaner
- Location: Nal, Bikaner, Rajasthan, India
- Opened: 1964; 62 years ago
- Elevation AMSL: 229 m (751 ft)
- Coordinates: 28°04′14″N 73°12′25″E
- Website: nalairport.com

Map
- Location within Rajasthan Location within India

Runways
Direction	Length		Surface
Direction	m	ft	Surface
05/23	2,731	8,960	Asphalt

Statistics (April 2025 - March 2026)
- Passengers: 46,943 (▲242.3%)
- Aircraft movements: 902 (▲109.8%)
- Cargo tonnage: 0 ( 0%)
- Source: AAI

Nal Air Force Station (IATA: BKB, ICAO: VIBK), also known as Bikaner Air Force Station and Civil Airport Bikaner, is a domestic airport and an Indian Air Force Station, which serves the city of Bikaner in Rajasthan, India. It is located at Nal, 13 km (8 mi) west of the city. The civil enclave within is operated by the Airports Authority of India (AAI) and regular scheduled flight under the UDAN scheme were inaugurated in 2017. The IAF has deployed the first squadron of the indigenous HAL Tejas MK.1A (No.3 IAF) at this base.

== History ==
By 1964, the diversionary Indian Air Force airfield at Nal was built and operationally ready. The civil air terminal as an enclave within the airforce station was inaugurated on 29 June 2014, and on 26 September 2017 regular flight to Delhi was inaugurated by Air India.

The government-owned Vayudoot operated a 20-seater aircraft to this airport in the past but the service was terminated in 1987. The foundation stone of the new terminal was laid in March 2009 by the then Chief Minister Ashok Gehlot. The airport was expected to be completed in March 2012. A dispute between the AAI and the Ministry of Defence (MoD) regarding height of the terminal building led to delay in starting air services. AAI authorities constructed the building up to the height of 6.75 metres, whereas MoD had permitted a maximum height of 5 metres. The civil enclave will include a terminal for 100 passengers and a 60 x 90 m apron capable of holding two ATR 72 aircraft. Bikaner Airport construction was completed in August 2013.

== Airlines and destinations ==
Airlines	Destinations
Alliance Air	Delhi
IndiGo	Delhi

== See also ==
- List of airports in Rajasthan
