= Bhawana Kanth =

Indian aviator

Squadron Leader Bhawana Kanth
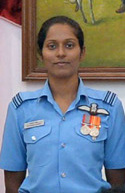
- Born: 1 December 1992 (age 33); Darbhanga,Bihar, India
- Military career
- Allegiance: India
- Service: Indian Air Force
- Service years: 2016–present
- Rank: Squadron Leader
- Unit: No. 3 Squadron IAF
- Awards: Nari Shakti Puraskar (2020)

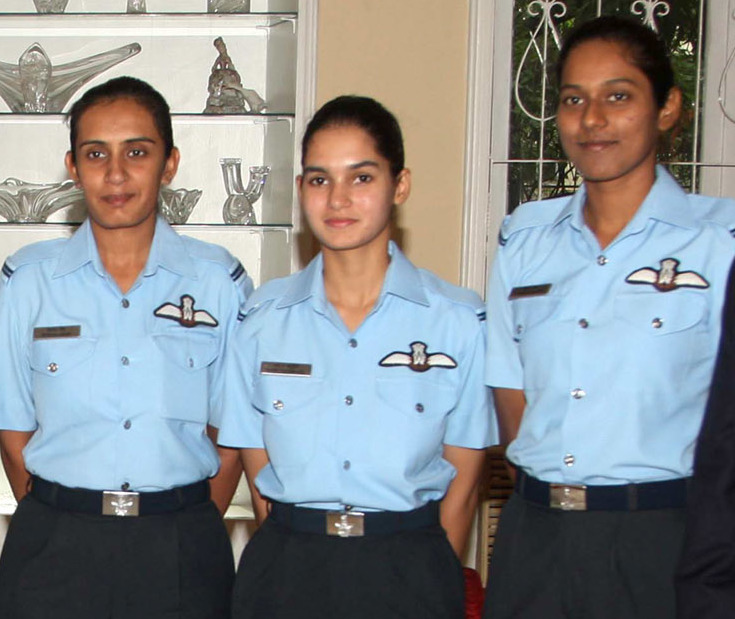
(L-R) Mohana Singh Jitarwal, Avani Chaturvedi and Bhawana Kanth

Bhawana Kanth is the first female fighter pilot of India. She was declared as the first woman to qualify for undertaking missions on a fighter aircraft. She along with two of her cohort, Mohana Singh, and Avani Chaturvedi were inducted into the Indian Air Force fighter squadron in June 2016 and were formally commissioned by Defence Minister Manohar Parrikar. After the government of India decided to open the fighter stream in India Air Force for women on an experimental basis, these three women were the first to be selected for the program.

In May 2019, she became the first female fighter pilot in India to qualify to undertake combat missions.

== Early life ==
Kanth was born on 1 December 1992 in Darbhanga, Bihar. Her father Tej Narayan Kanth is an electrical engineer in Indian Oil Corporation and mother Radha Kanth is a home maker. While growing up, Kanth was fond of sports like Kho Kho, Badminton, swimming and painting.

== Education ==
Kanth completed her schooling from DAV Public School in Barauni refinery. She prepared for engineering entrance examinations in Kota, Rajasthan, and joined Bachelor of Engineering in Medical Electronics from BMS College of Engineering, Bengaluru for further studies. She graduated in 2014 and was recruited for IT giant Tata Consultancy Services.

== Career ==
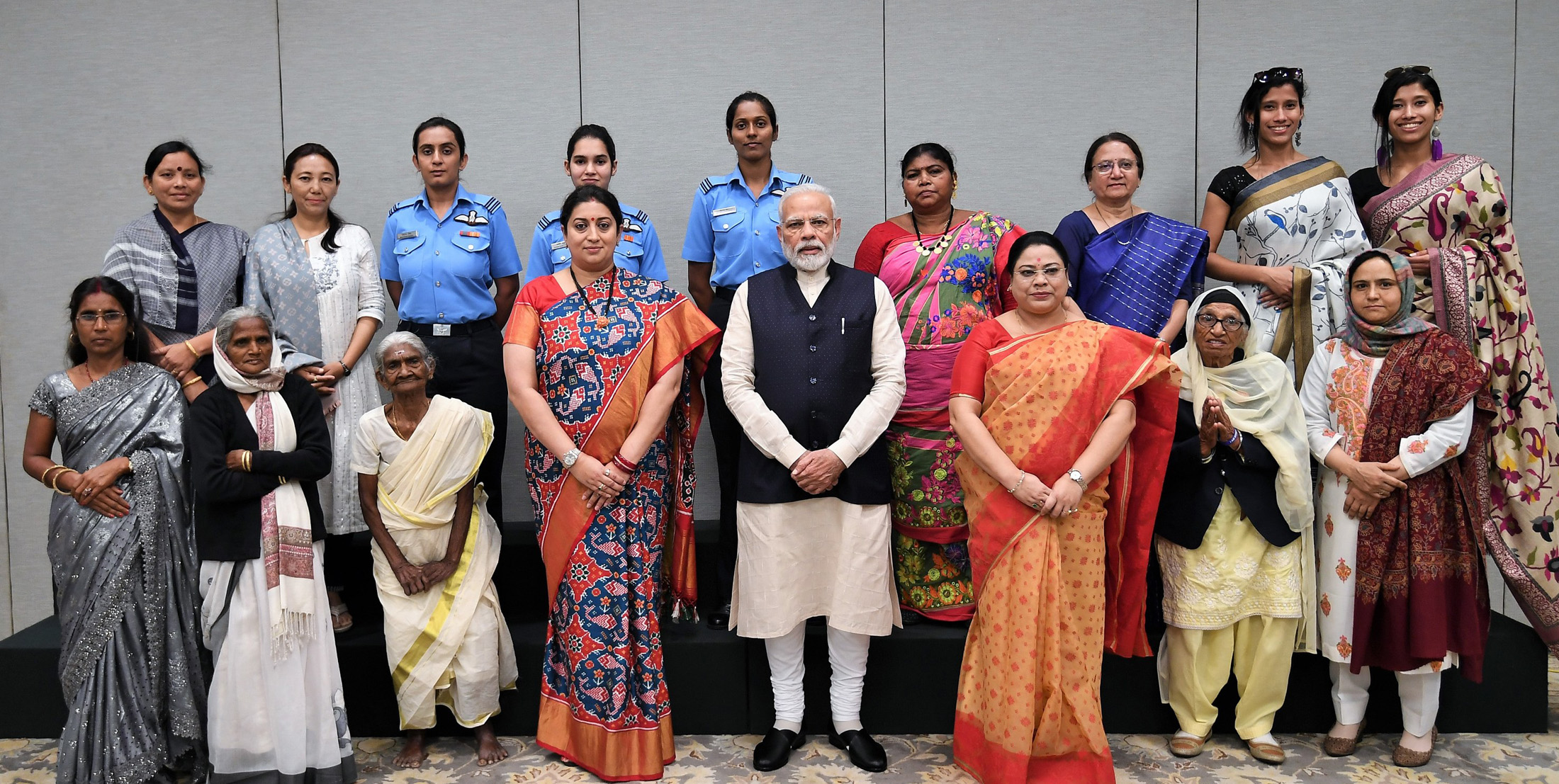
Prime Minister Narendra Modi with the Nari Shakti Awardees on International Women's Day in 2020.

Kanth had always dreamt of flying planes. She took the Air Force Common Admission Test and was selected to be commissioned into the Air Force. As a part of her Stage 1 training, she joined the fighter stream.

In June 2016, Kanth underwent a six month long stage-II training on Kiran Intermediate Jet Trainers at Hakimpet Air Force Station in Hyderabad soon after which she got commissioned as Flying Officer at Combined Graduation Parade Spring Term at the Air Force Academy in Dundigal the same year.

Kanth flew Hawk advanced jet trainers at AFS Bidar and it has been the plan to move her and the other two members of her cohort to MIG 21 Bison squadron. Flying Officer Bhawana Kanth on 16 March 2018 takes the solo flight of Mig-21 ‘Bison’. She made the solo flight of Mig-21 from Ambala Air Force Station at around 1400 hours.

Kanth also tried some modelling assignments and appeared in print advertisements.

On 9 March 2020, she was awarded with Nari Shakti Puraskar by President Ram Nath Kovind

She is posted to the Indian Air Force's No. 3 Squadron Cobras.
