= Kiran Shekhawat =

Indian Navy officer (1988–2015)

- Allegiance: India
- Branch: Indian Navy

Kiran Shekhawat (1 May 1988 – 24 March 2015) was the first Indian Navy woman officer to sacrifice her life in the line of duty. On a flight as an observer with the Indian Navy, the woman Naval officer was martyred in a Dornier crash off the Goa coast on 24 March 2015. Lt. Shekhawat was the wife of another Naval officer, Vivek Chhoker.

== Biography ==
=== Early life ===
She was born on 1 May 1988 in Mumbai into a Rajput family. She was born to Vijendra Singh Shekhawat and Madhu Chauhan, and belonged to Sefarguwar village in Khetri tehsil of Jhunjhunu district in Rajasthan. She completed her schooling from Kendriya Vidyalaya-II in Vishakhapatnam and then graduated with a Bachelor of Science in Physics from Andhra University. She then worked with a private bank before joining the Indian Naval Academy (INA) in Ezhimala, Kerala in 2010. Lt Shekhawat had married a fellow naval officer Lt. Vivek Singh Chhoker from Kurthala village (Nuh)distt near Gurgaon, where her mother-in-law Sunita Chhoker was a sarpanch and the family had some agricultural land.

=== Naval career ===
She was commissioned on 5 July 2010 to join the Indian Naval Air Squadron (INAS) 310 — a premier IW squadron nicknamed Cobras. In her five-year career, she was posted across various Naval stations and was transferred to Goa in 2015. Being an expert on intelligence warfare, she was recording the environment charts and various other parameters required for intelligence analysis during the ill-fated training sortie.

She was born to a Navy officer and joined the Navy herself. A big fan of author Nicholas Sparks, she read all his books or watched the movies based on them. Lt Shekhawat, an Observer, had taken part in the first all-women marching contingent of the Navy during the Republic Day parade of January 2015. Her father was retired from the Navy as Master Chief Petty Officer and had started a charitable organization called, Lt Kiran Shekhawat Foundation in her honour. Her husband, Lt. Cdr. Vivek Singh Chhoker, is also a naval officer presently serving as an instructor in the Naval Academy in Ezhimala in Kerala.

== Death ==
The Indian Navy Dornier that crashed during a night sortie on 24 March 2015 was being flown by a competent and experienced team comprising Lt Kiran Shekhawat, co-pilot Lt Abhinav Nagori and Commander Nikhil Joshi. Lt Kiran was operating in a combat role as an observer in the tactical sorties flown over the ocean for tracking and engaging hostile ships violating the country's maritime boundaries. Her body and that of the co-pilot Lt Abhinav Nagori were recovered two days after the crash, while the pilot Commander Nikhil Joshi was rescued by a fisherman. The wreckage of the Dornier was found about 60 m under the sea at the south-west of Goa coast. The body of Lieutenant Shekhawat was found inside the fuselage of the aircraft.

== Legacy ==
- A Shaheed Park has been developed in the honour of Lt Kiran Shekhawat on a 2 acres land at Kurthala (Nuh) in Haryana.
- A life-size statue of Lt Kiran Shekhawat has been installed in the Shaheed Park at Kurthala.
- A 7.5 Kilometres of road stretch between Chechera and Village Bighwali has been named after Lt Kiran Shekhawat in her honour.
- Lt Kiran Shekhawat's family has established a society in March 2016 named “Lt Kiran Shekhawat Foundation“ to work for weaker sections of society and to organize periodical events with an aim to inspire the young generation

== Events ==
Shekhawat, an observer, had taken part in the first all-women marching contingent of the Navy during the Republic Day parade. The maritime surveillance aircraft had crashed south-west off Goa coast on Tuesday night at 2208 hours was flown by Commander Nikhil Kuldip Joshi, who was flying the aircraft and had 4,000 flying hours to his credit, was rescued about an hour after the crash by a fishing vessel.

== Recovery ==
The INS Makar, a naval hydrographic vessel, had detected a large metallic object using its side-scan sonar at a depth of 50–60 metres. Later it was confirmed to be remains of the ill-fated aircraft.
