= Women in warfare and the military (1945–1999) =

Aspect of women's history

This list is about women in warfare and the military from 1945 to 1999, worldwide.

For the United States specifically, see Timeline of women in warfare in the United States from 1950 to 1999. Also see Women in the Vietnam War.

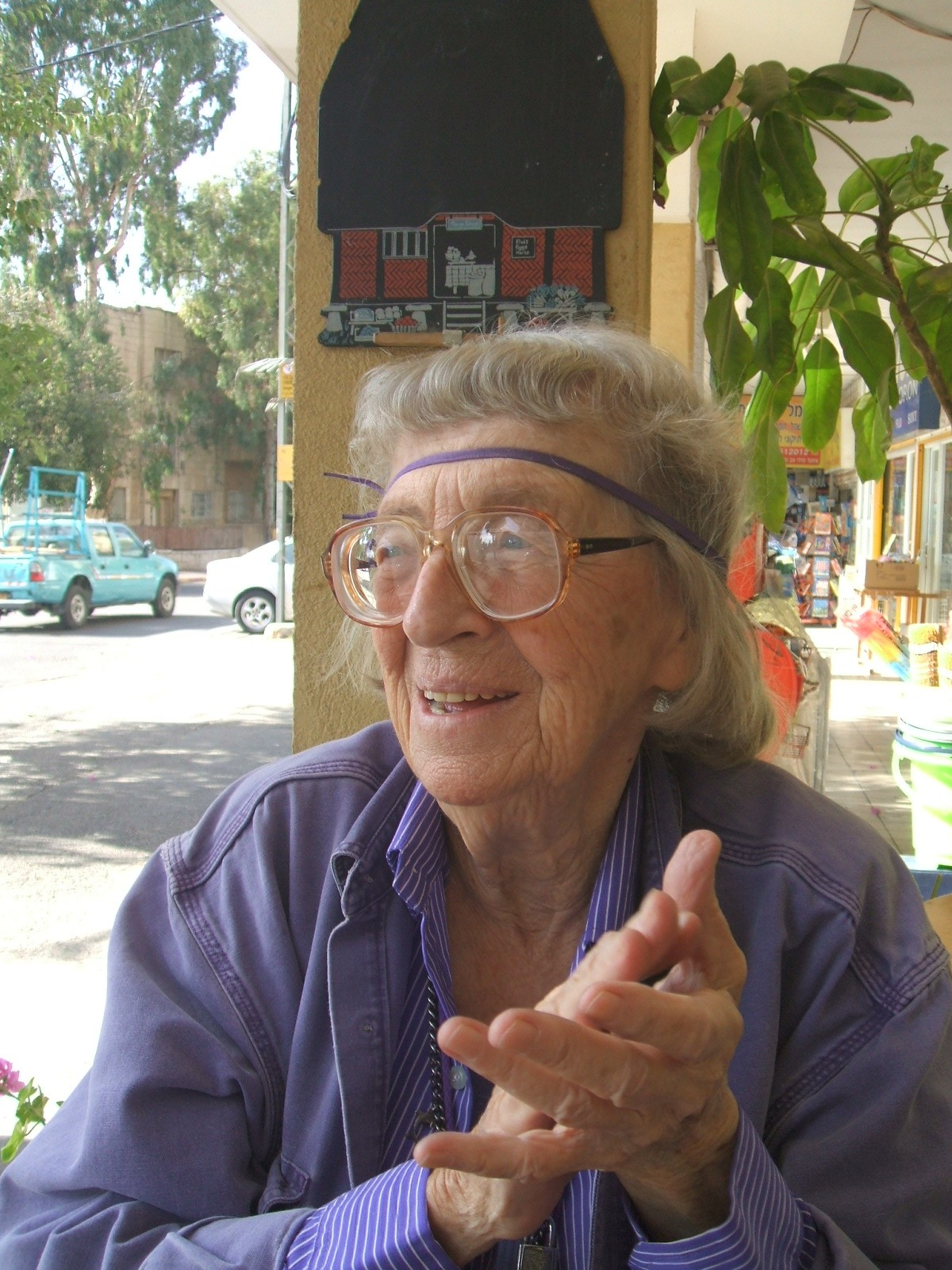
Netiva Ben-Yehuda

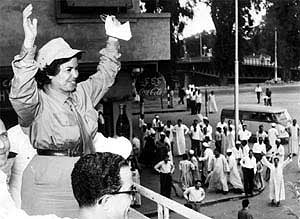
Rawya Ateya

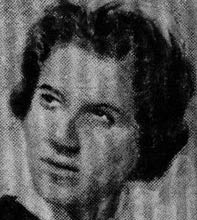
Hassiba Ben Bouali

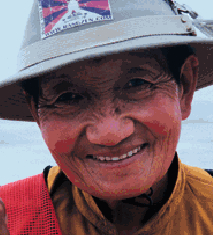
Ani Pachen

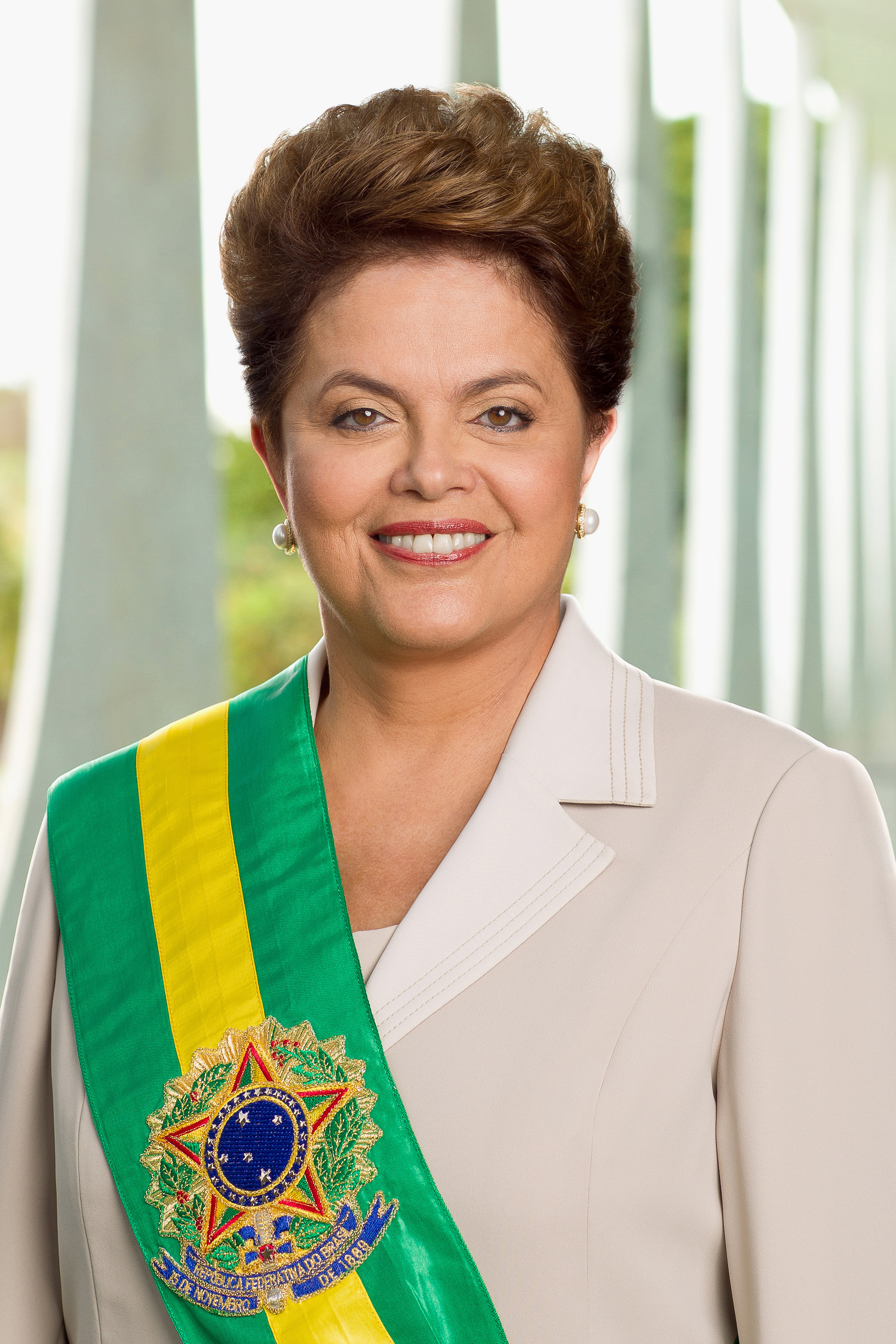
Dilma Rousseff

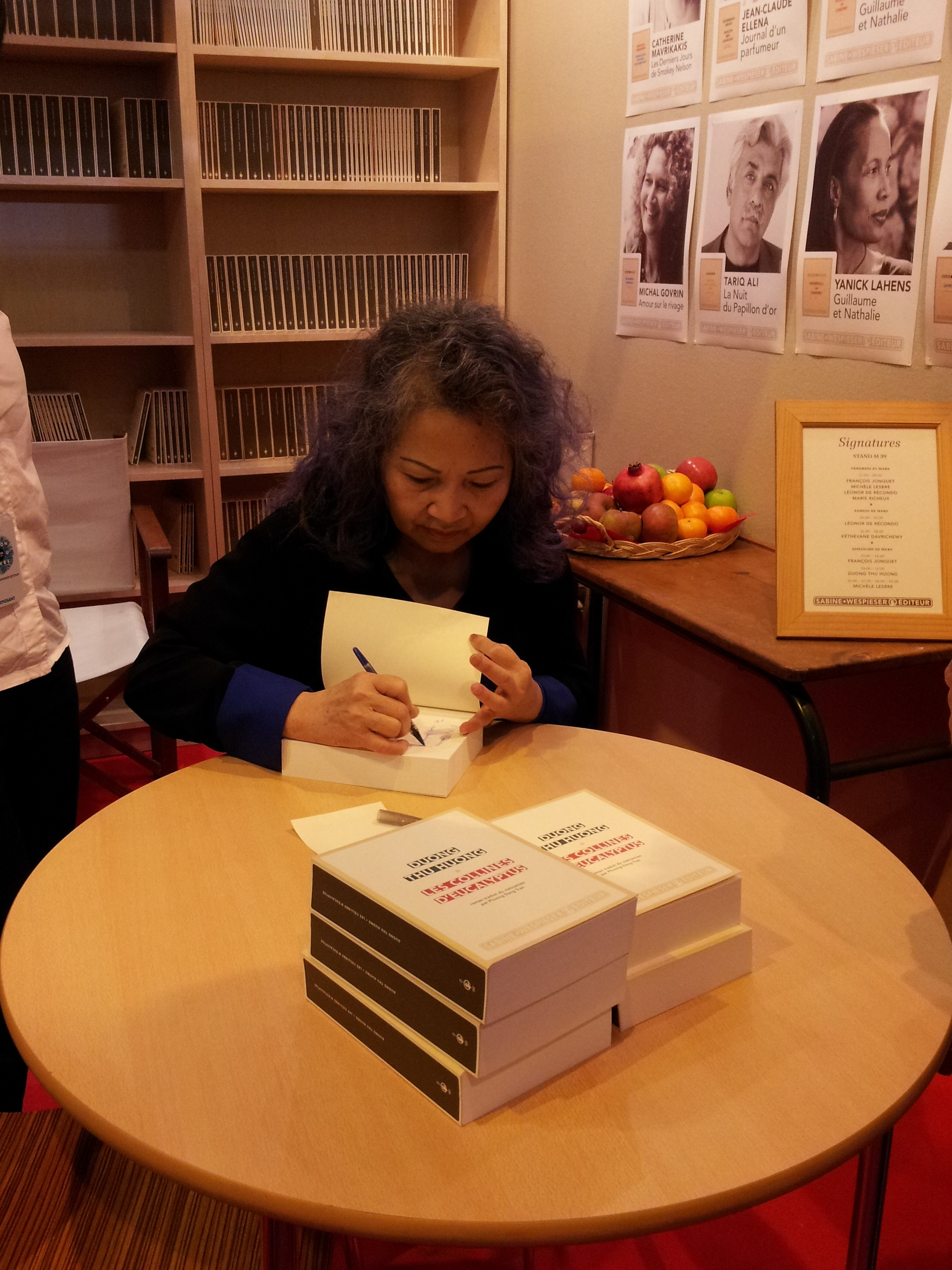
Dương Thu Hương

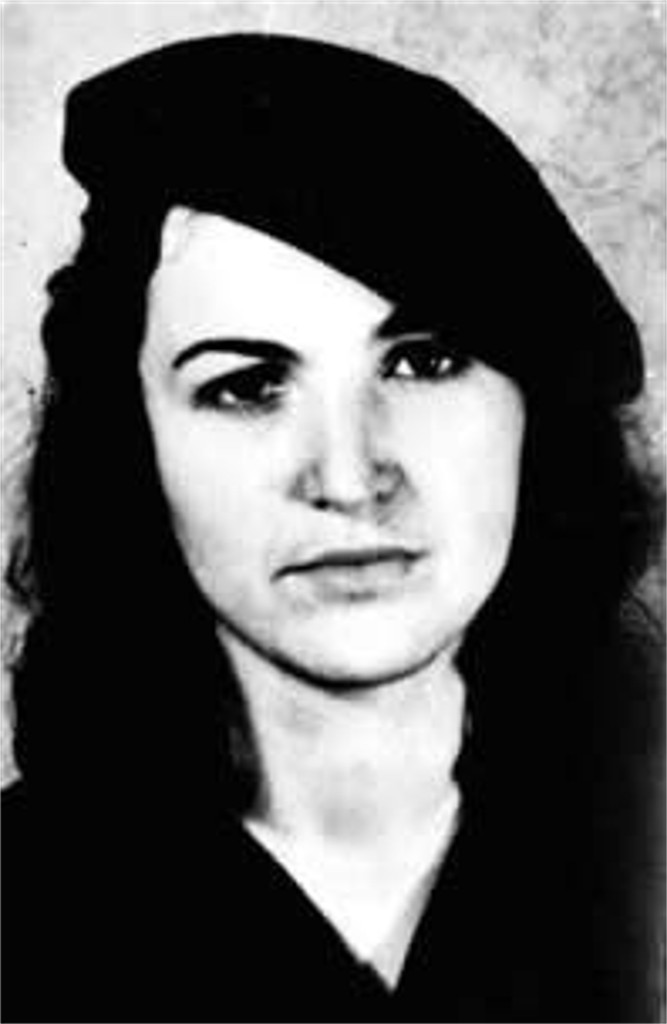
Tamara Bunke

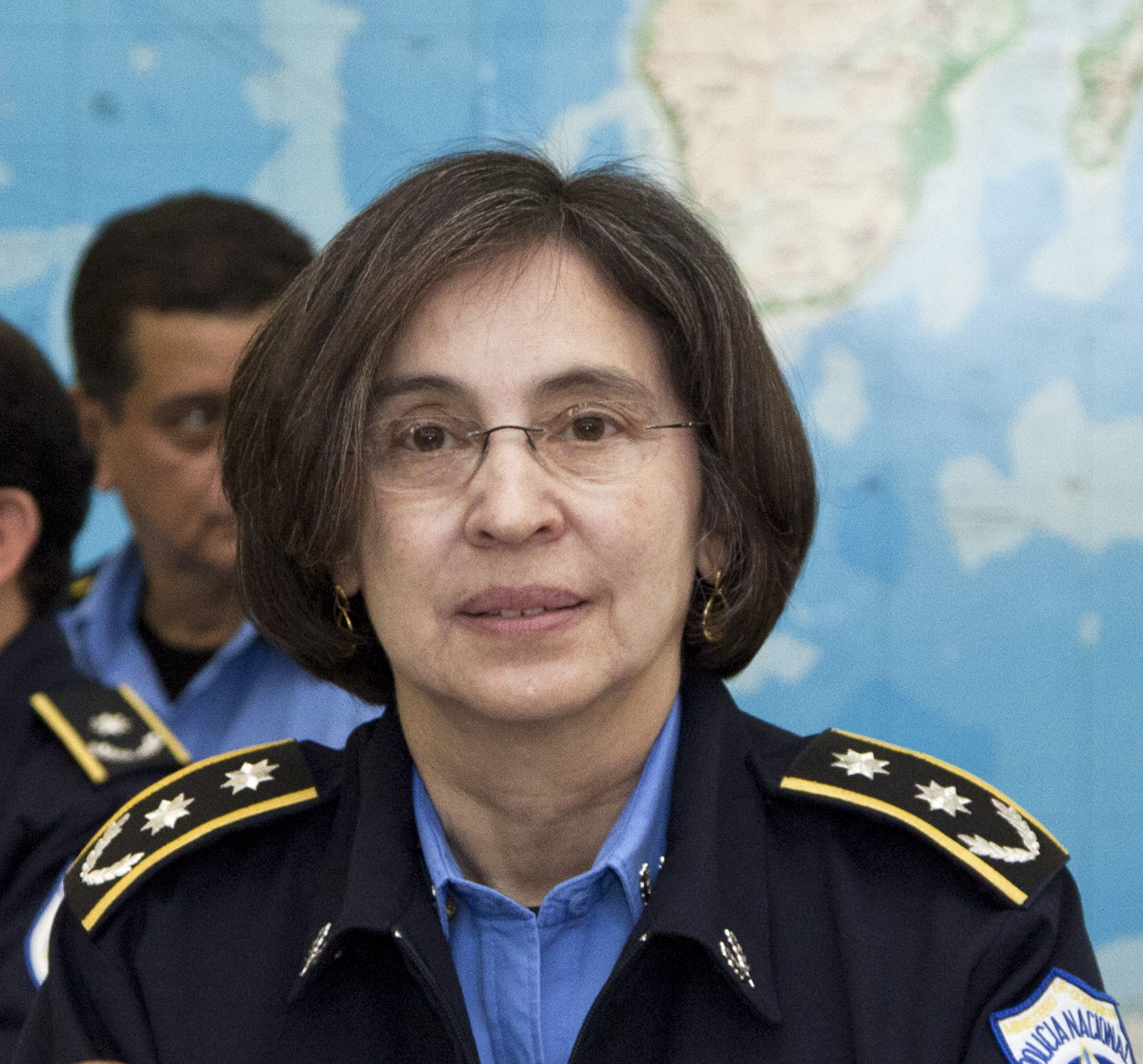
Aminta Granera

Fay Chung

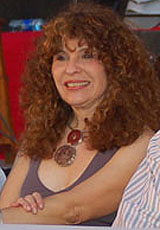
Gioconda Belli

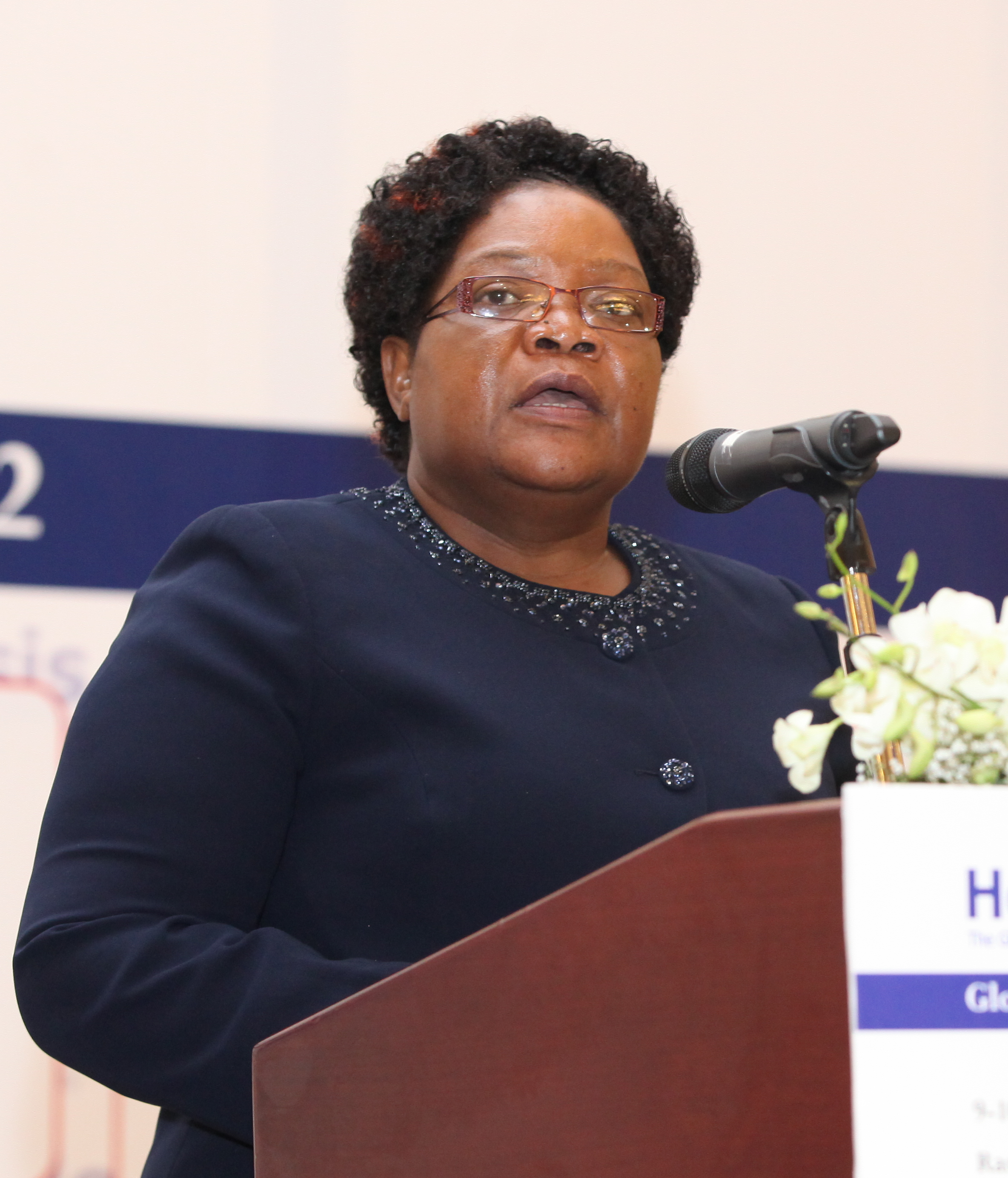
Joyce Mujuru

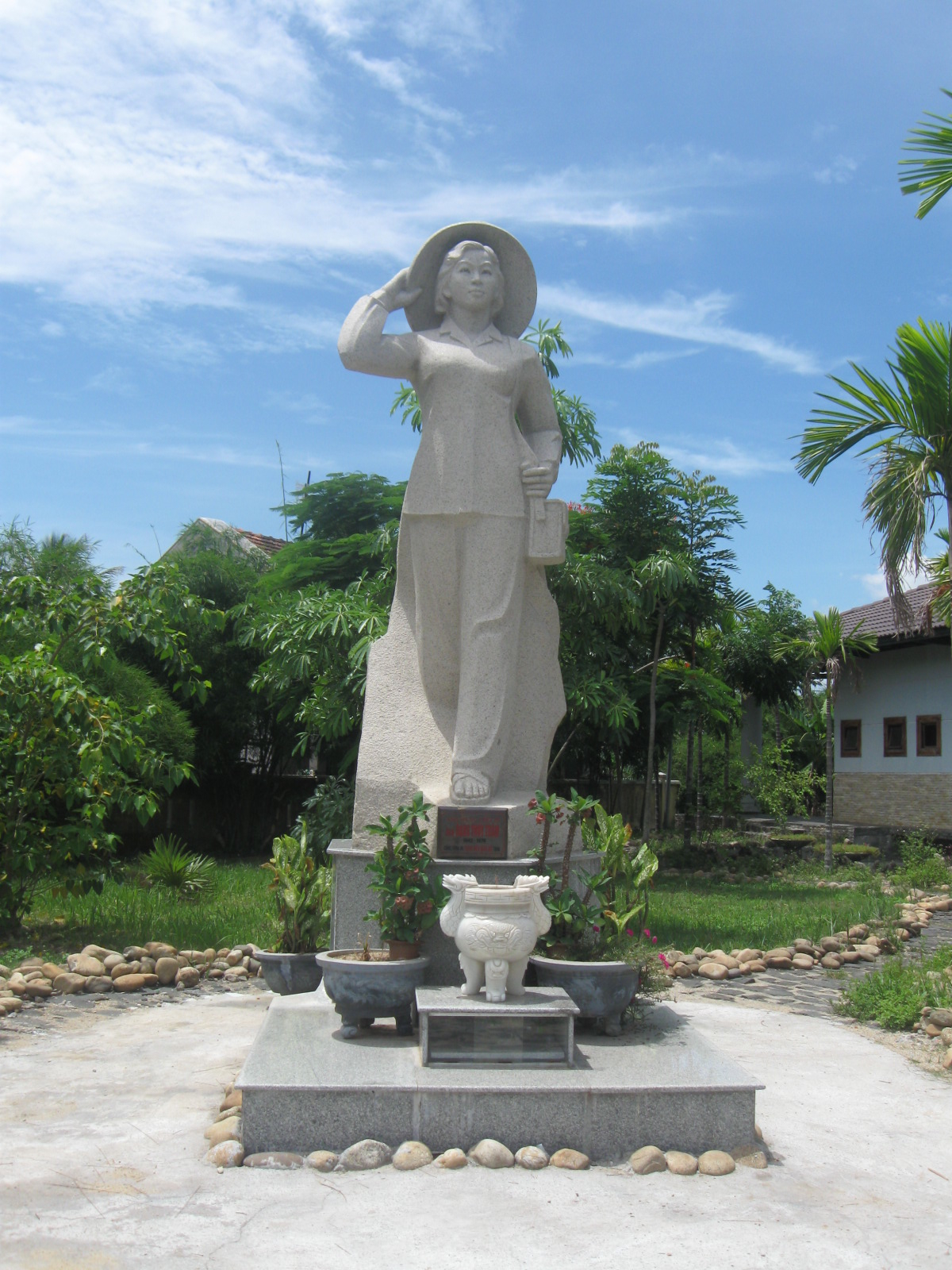
Đặng Thùy Trâm

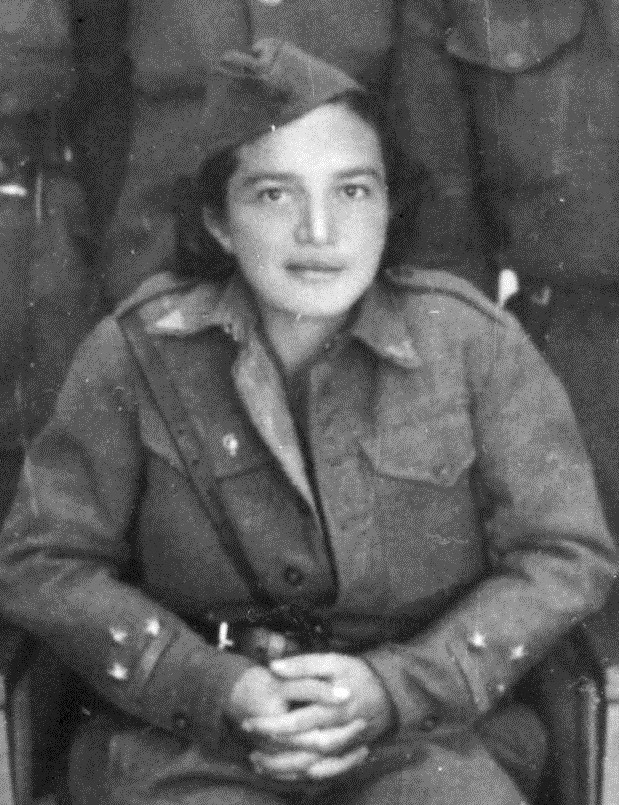
Roza Papo

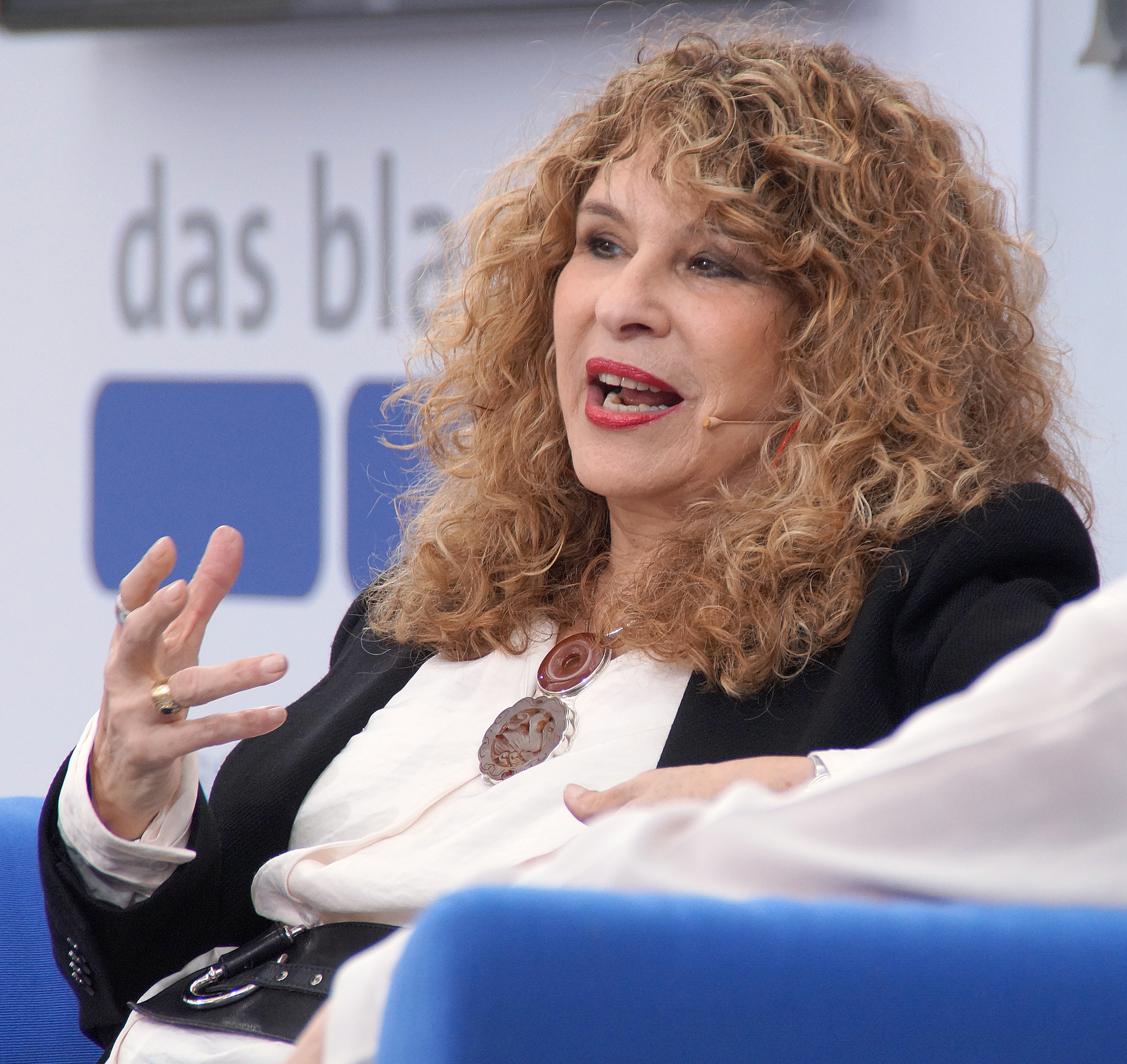
Gioconda Belli

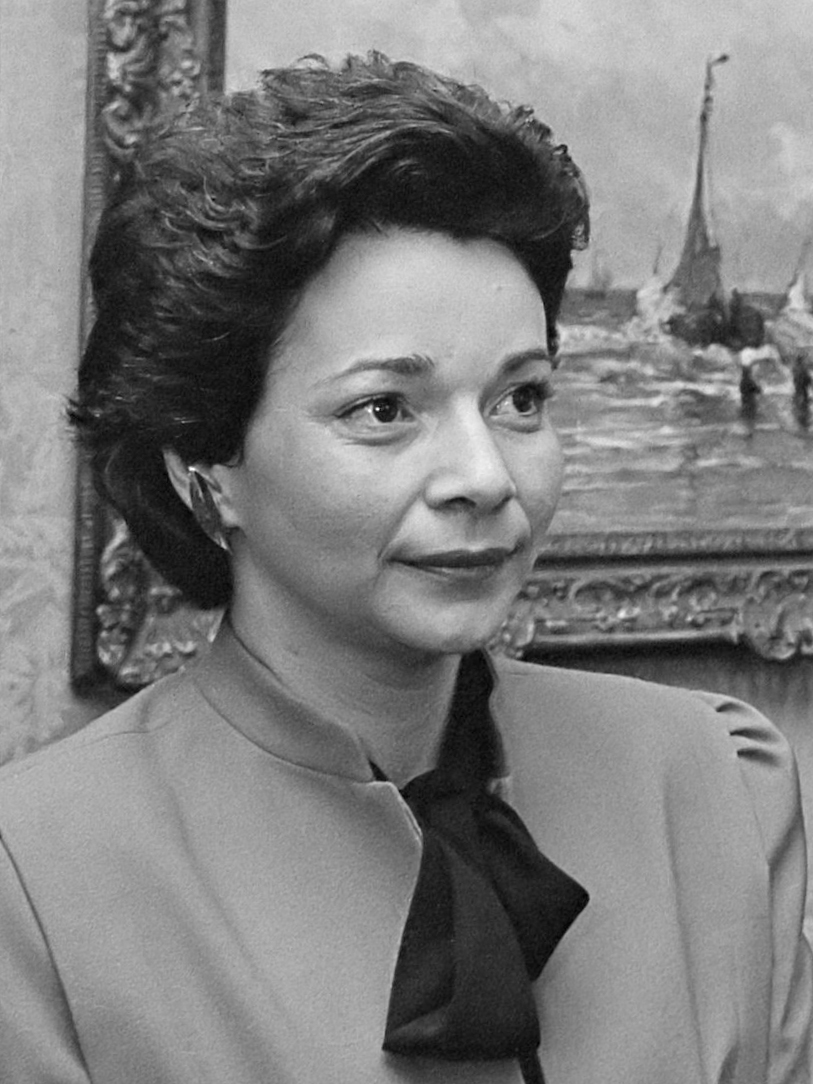
Nora Astorga

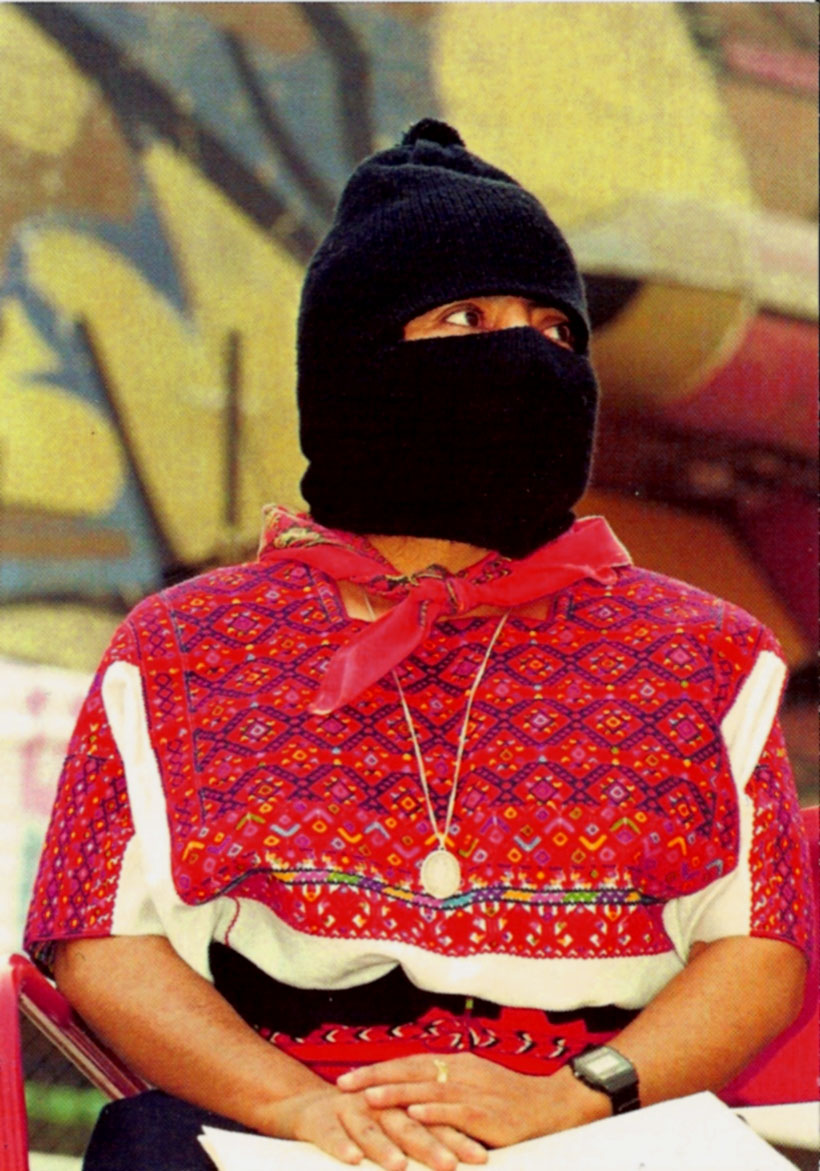
Comandanta Ramona

== 1945–1949 ==
- 1948 Netiva Ben-Yehuda fights in the 1948 Arab–Israeli War.
- 1948 Moheba Khorsheed leads an all-female Palestinian brigade in the 1948 Palestine War

== 1950s ==
- 1950: Hate Woman of the Kainai Nation died. When she married her husband Weasel Tail, she loved him so much that she refused to let him go into battle without her, so that they would never die apart. She went on five raids armed with a six-shooter. On one raid, she stole a saddle, an ammunition bag, and a war club. After another raid, she, her husband and one other man returned with fourteen good horses. Hate Woman was asked to tell her adventures at the Sun Dance celebration, an unusual honor.
- 1950: Blanca Canales leads the Jayuya Uprising in Puerto Rico against the federal government of the United States.
- 1950: Korean War. Women's Army Corps is created in Korea.
- 1950: The Women's Auxiliary Australian Air Force was reestablished and allowed to use a Royal prefix to be called WRAAF.
- 1950: The Women's Royal Australian Army Corps was founded in place of the Australian Women's Army Service.
- 1951: The Women's Royal Australian Naval Service was reestablished.
- 1951: Yael Rom (Hebrew: יעל רום; 1932–2006), born Yael Finkelstein, was one of the first female pilots of the Israeli Air Force and the first trained and certified by the force. Rom received her wings on December 27, 1951, graduating the IAF's 5th flying course.
- 1953: Korean War ends. Women start serving in the South Korean military.
- 1953–1959: Cuban women fight in the Cuban Revolution led by Celia Sánchez Mandulay, among them Haydée Santamaría.
- 1955: Private Esther Arditi becomes the first female soldier to be awarded an IDF decoration, the Medal of Distinguished Service.
- 1955: August 22, 1955: Vijayalakshmi Ramanan became the Indian Air Force's first female officer; she was commissioned in the Army Medical Corps on August 22, 1955, and was seconded to the Air Force with effect from the same day.
- September 27, 1955: Chinese Li Zhen is given the 1st Class Order of Liberation granted the rank of Major General.
- 1956: Rawya Ateya became the first woman to be commissioned as an officer in the Liberation Army. She played an active role in the Suez War, during which Egypt was invaded by the United Kingdom, France and Israel. She helped train 4,000 women in first aid and nursing amid the war. She held the rank of captain in a women's commando unit.
- 1956–1957: Battle of Algiers (1956–1957) takes place. Several women participate, including Hassiba Ben Bouali, and Zohra Drif.
- 1958–1960: Tibetan Buddhist nun Ani Pachen leads her clan in armed rebellion against the Chinese.
- 1958: Dương Thu Hương leads a communist youth brigade for ten years in the Vietnam War. She later became a political dissident and is now living in exile from Vietnam.

== 1960s ==
- 1960: Margaret George Shello is commonly believed to have been the first female Peshmerga; she joined the Peshmerga in 1960.
- 1961: Josephine Okwuekeleke Tolefe was the first female Commissioned Officer in the Nigerian Army; she was granted Short Service Commission on February 7, 1961, in the rank of Second Lieutenant with seniority in the rank with effect from same date.
- 1961–1964: Phung Le Ly fights for the Viet Cong during the Vietnam War, an experience she chronicles in her memoir When Heaven and Earth Changed Places.
- 1963: Josephine Okwuekeleke Tolefe became the first woman to attain the rank of an Army Captain in Nigeria, which she attained on June 1, 1963.
- 1965: The government decided to let women be employed in the Canadian military with a fixed ceiling of 1,500 (which was 1.5% of the military at that time.)
- 1967: Dilma Rousseff fights as a guerrilla in Brazil. She later became Brazil's first female president.
- August 31, 1967: Haydée Tamara Bunke Bider, alias Tania the Guerrilla, communist revolutionary, is killed battling Bolivian soldiers.
- 1969: Annapurna Kunwar became the first female officer in the Nepali Army to para jump.

== 1970s ==
- 1970s: Aminta Granera abandons her training as a nun to join the Sandinistas and fight against Nicaraguan dictator Anastasio Somoza Debayle.
- 1970s: Fay Chung joins ZANU.
- June 22, 1970: Đặng Thùy Trâm, a Vietnamese military doctor, is killed by United States forces while defending a hospital. Her wartime diaries are published in 2005.
- 1971: Taramon Bibi fights Pakistan during the Bangladesh Liberation War.
- 1973: Roza Papo, Yugoslav military physician, becomes the first female general on the Balkan Peninsula.
- 1973: Colonel Joan Fitzgerald became the first Canadian military woman to graduate from the National Defence College.
- February 17, 1974: Zimbabwean politician Joice Mujuru shoots down a helicopter with a machine gun during the Rhodesian Bush War. She eventually takes the nom-du-guerre Teurai Ropa ("Spill Blood"), and then rose to become one of the first women commanders in Mugabe's ZANLA forces.
- 1974: Maj. Wendy Clay, a doctor, qualifies for her pilot's wings in the Canadian military six years before the pilot classification is opened to all women.
- 1975: Nicaraguan Gioconda Belli is forced into exile for her activities as a Sandinista.
- 1976: Gertrude Alice Ram becomes the first Indian woman general officer. Appointed Director of Military Nursing Service. Third army in the world to have women general officers.
- 1977: The navy of Japan accepted its first female recruits.
- 1977: The Women's Royal Australian Air Force was absorbed into the mainstream RAAF.
- 1978: Cpl. Gail Toupin becomes the first female member of the SkyHawks, the Canadian Army's skydiving demonstration team.
- 1979: Nora Astorga acts as a guerrilla fighter in the Nicaraguan Revolution.
- 1979: Canadian military colleges opened to women.
- 1979: 81 of 127 Canadian military trades opened to women.
- 1979: Australian women in the military got equal pay.
- 1979: The Women's Royal Australian Army Corps started being absorbed into the regular army.
- 1979: Agnes Fong Sock Har became the first woman to hold the appointment of a commanding officer in the Singapore Armed Forces (SAF) when she took command of the first Air Supply Base in 1979.

== 1980s ==
- 1981: 2nd Lieut. Inge Plug becomes the first female helicopter pilot in the Canadian military.
- 1981: Lieut. Karen McCrimmon becomes the Canadian Forces' first female air navigator.
- 1985: Women have been allowed into almost all operational functions of Norway's Armed Forces since 1985. The exceptions are the para-rangers and marine commandos, because as of 2011 no woman has met the entry requirements.
- 1985: The Women's Royal Australian Naval Service was completely integrated into the Royal Australian Navy.
- 1986: Rebecca Mpagi joined the National Resistance Army; she was the first Ugandan woman to join the army as a military pilot.
- 1986–1987: Alice Auma leads a rebellion against Ugandan government forces.
- 1987: The first two female Royal Australian Air Force pilots enlisted: Robyn Williams and Deborah Hicks.
- 1988: Col. Sheila A. Hellstrom is the first female graduate of National Defence College in Canada. She becomes the first Canadian Regular Force woman to be promoted to the rank of brigadier-general.
- 1988: First female gunners in the Canadian Regular Force graduate from qualification 3 training.
- January 19, 1989: Canadian Forces soldier Heather Erxleben becomes the first female to graduate from a Regular Force infantry trades training course.
- 1989: Maj. Dee Brasseur became the first Canadian female fighter pilot of a CF-18 Hornet.
- 1989: The Canadian Human Rights Commission ruled that all obstacles to women's access to any military job must be removed, except for service aboard submarines and Catholic chaplains.
- 1989: Lorraine Francis Orthlieb became the first woman in the Canadian military to reach Commodore.
- Late 1980s: Latifa and Lailuma Nabizada become the first female graduates of the Afghan Airforce Academy. Lailuma eventually died in childbirth, making Latifa the first female pilot in Afghan history.

== 1990s ==
- Early 1990s: Jo Salter becomes the Royal Air Force's first female fighter pilot.
- 1991: HMCS Nipigon becomes the first Canadian mixed-gender warship to participate in exercises with NATO's Standing Naval Forces Atlantic.
- 1991: Lieut. Anne Reiffenstein (née Proctor), Lieut. Holly Brown and Capt. Linda Shrum graduate from artillery training as the first female officers in the combat arms in Canada.
- 1992: On July 13, 1992, 22 women began their naval training at INS Mandovi in Goa to become the first commissioned officers in the Indian defence forces. Prior to 1992, the Indian Navy enlisted women only in the role of doctor.
- 1992: Marlene Shillingford became the first woman to join the Snowbirds team in the Canadian military.
- 1992: The Australia government declared women could serve in all Army, Navy and Air Force units, except direct combat units.
- 1993: Lieut. (N) Leanne Crowe is the first woman in Canada to qualify as a clearance diving officer and is subsequently the first woman to become Officer Commanding of the Experimental Diving Unit.
- January 1, 1994: Comandanta Ramona, an officer of Zapatista Army of National Liberation, takes control of San Cristóbal de las Casas, a Mexican city.
- 1994: The Military University of Mongolia begins recruiting female cadets in 1994. Bolor Ganbold is the first female cadet to be recruited.
- 1994: Maj.-Gen. Wendy Clay becomes the first woman in Canada promoted to that rank.
- 1994: Women officers have been allowed to do Short Service Commission in the Indian Air Force since 1994.
- 1995: Chief Warrant Officer Linda Smith is the first woman to be named Wing Chief Warrant Officer in the Canadian Forces, at 17 Wing Winnipeg.
- 1995: Chief Petty Officer, 2nd Class Holly Kisbee becomes the first woman Combat Chief of a major warship in Canada.
- 1995: Maj. Micky Colton becomes the first female pilot in Canada to complete 10,000 flying hours in a Hercules aircraft.
- 1995: A Norwegian woman, Solveig Krey, became the first female commanding officer of a submarine in the world when she took command of the first Kobben-class submarine on September 11, 1995.
- 1995: Lieut. Ruth-Ann Shamuhn of 5 Combat Engineer Regiment becomes the first female combat diver in Canada.
- 1995: The Royal Norwegian Navy became the first navy in the world to appoint a female submarine captain.
- 1996: Law 26628 was adopted in 1996 in Peru. This law opened the Armed Forces’ training schools for officers and noncommissioned officers to women.
- 1996: Wafa Dabbagh became the first Canadian Armed Forces member to wear a hijab.
- 1997: The first woman officers to be posted on board a warship in the Indian navy were Surgeon Commander Vinita Tomar and Sub Lieutenant Rajeshwari Kori, who in 1997 were posted on INS Jyoti, a fleet support vessel.
- 1997: Pyeon Bo-ra, Jang Se-jin, and Park Ji-yeon became the first women to enter South Korea's Air Force Academy, and as such were called the "first female red mufflers".
- 1998: The Australian Navy became the second nation to allow women to serve on combat submarines. Canada and Spain followed in permitting women to serve on military submarines.
- 1998: A woman became the first female commanding officer of a naval shore establishment in the Australian military.
- 1998: Brigadier Patricia Purves becomes the first British one-star general selected in open competition across the British Army. (The Women's Royal Army Corps, disbanded in 1992, had a 'tied' brigadier appointment.)
- 1998: Although women had served as pilots during the 1948 Arab–Israeli War and a few years thereafter, the Israel Defense Forces had until 1995 denied women the opportunity to become pilots. After the prohibition was lifted, the first female graduate was F-16 navigator "Shari" in 1998.
- January 1999: Indonesian woman Cut Syamsurniati successfully leads a group of women to negotiate with the military when her village is attacked.
- 1999: Arlene dela Cruz became the first woman to graduate at the top of her class at the Philippine Military Academy.
- 1999: Australia obtained its first female Navy pilot.

== See also ==
- Women in warfare and the military (1900–1945)
- Women in warfare and the military (2000–present)
