= Women in warfare and the military (1900–1945) =

Aspect of women's history

This timeline of women in warfare and the military (1900–1945) deals with the role of women in the military around the world from 1900 through 1945. The two major events in this time period were World War I and World War II. Please see Women in World War I and Women in World War II for more information.

For articles specifically pertaining to the United States, see: Timeline of women in war in the United States, pre-1945 and Timeline of women in warfare in the United States from 1900 to 1949.

== Timeline of women in warfare from 1900 until 1945 worldwide (except present US) ==
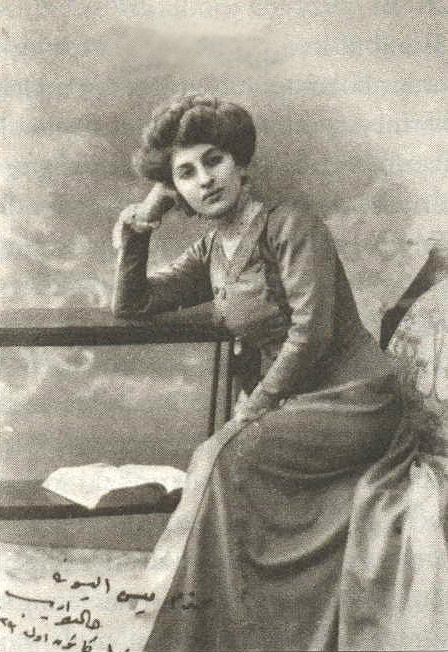
Halide Edib Adıvar

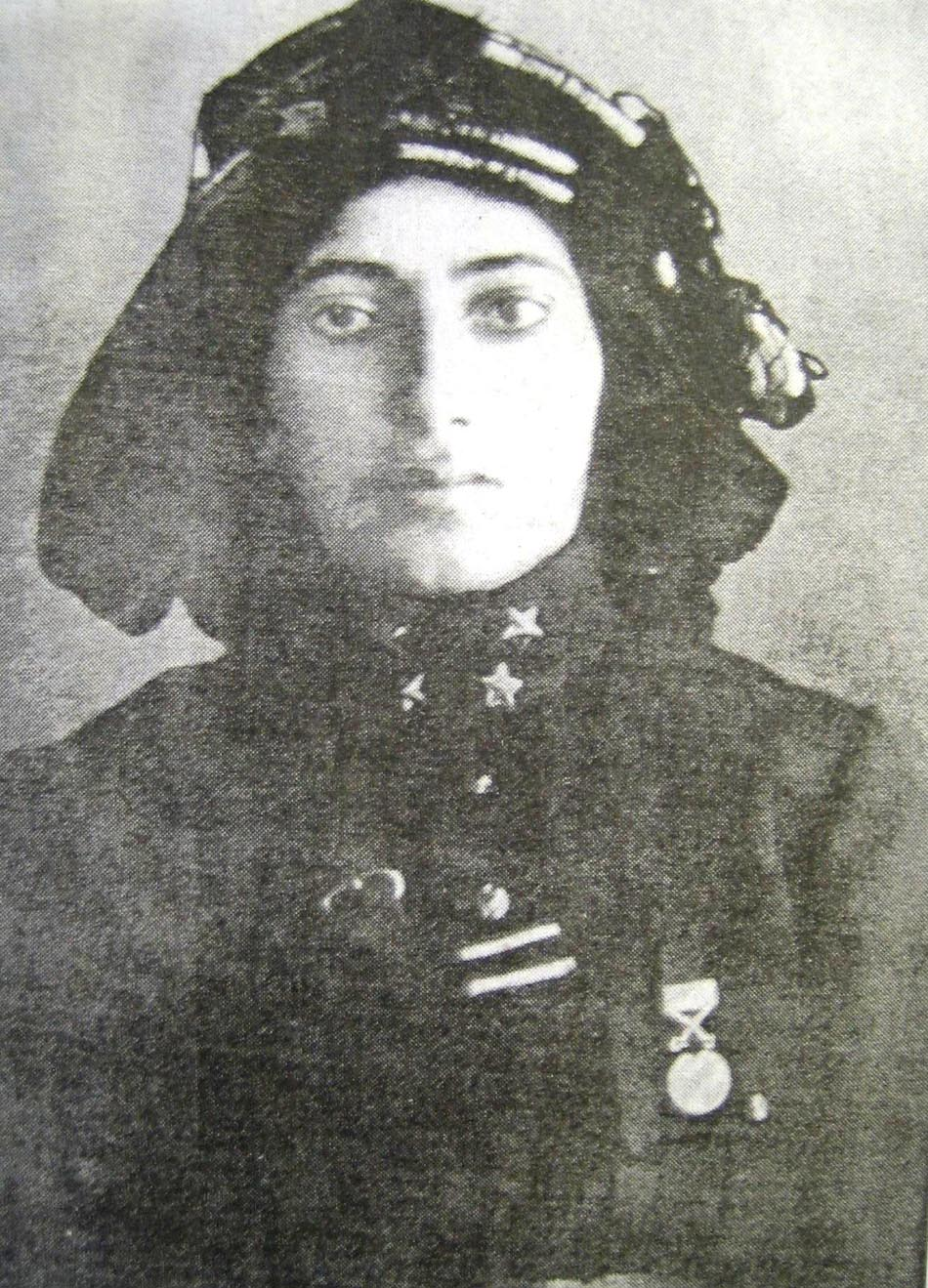
Kara Fatma

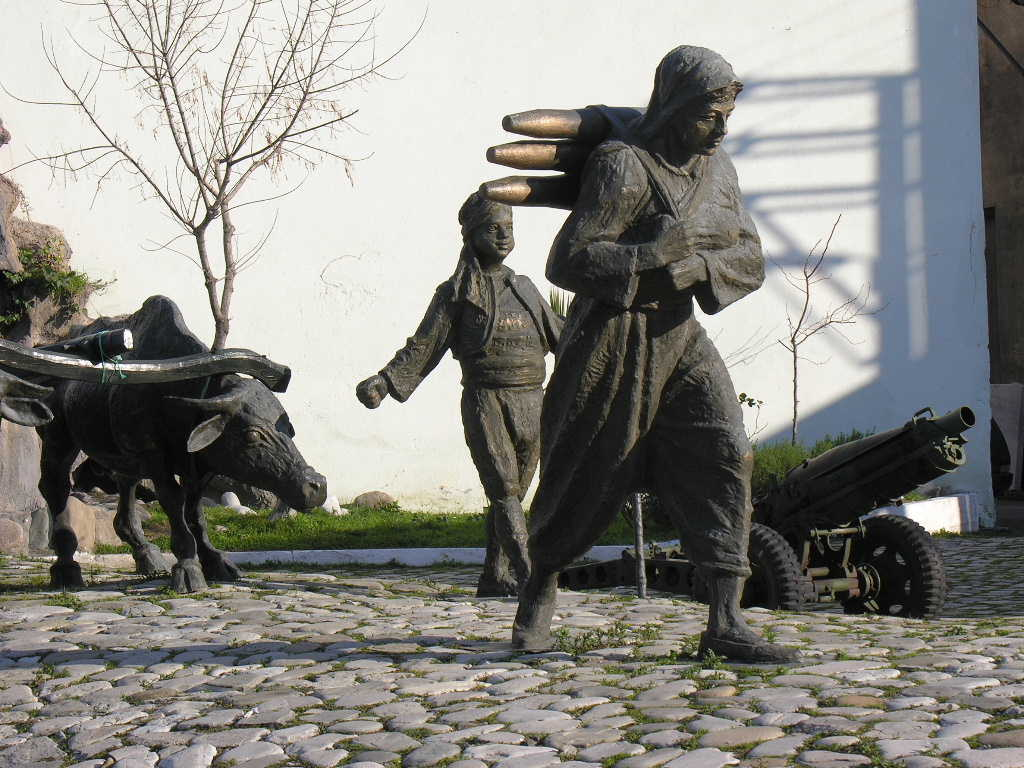
Şerife Bacı

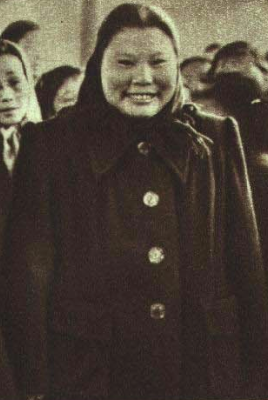
Kang Keqing

=== 1900s ===
- 1899–1900: Lin Hei'er commands the Red Lantern Unit of women rebel soldiers during the Boxer Rebellion.
- 1900: On August 7, Fanny Hines becomes the first Australian woman to die on active service.
- 1900: Yaa Asantewaa, the queen mother of the Ejisu, leads the Ashanti army in the War of the Golden Stool) against the British in the Gold Coast (modern Ghana).
- 1901 The Canadian Army Nursing Service began in 1901.
- 1904–1907: Herero warrior women fight alongside men against the Germans during the Herero and Namaqua Wars in German South-West Africa (modern Namibia).
- 1907: Korean independence fighter and activist Yun Hui-sun organizes a female militia group or "righteous army" of about 30 women, leading them in attacks against the Japanese.
- 1908: Georgina Fane Pope became the first matron-in-chief of the Canadian Army Nursing Corps when the corps began its official existence at this time.

=== 1910s ===
- 1910–1920: Mexican Revolution. Soldaderas (female soldiers) participated heavily.
- 1911: Numerous women's militias are formed by rebels during the Xinhai Revolution: Among these are Wu Shuqing's Women's Revolutionary Army, Yin Weijun and Lin Zongxue's Zhejiang Women's Army, Tang Qunying's Women's Northern Expedition Brigade, and many others. All these units are disbanded by the Provisional Government of the Republic of China on 26 February 1912, mostly for chauvinistic reasons.
- 1912: Rayna Kasabova is the first woman in history to participate in a military flight, flying as an observer on combat missions during the Balkan Wars. She carries out a number of sorties, including dropping propaganda materials and bombs on Ottoman positions during the siege of Adrianople.
- 1918: During the Finnish Civil War the "Reds" formed more than 15 female guards units, with a total of about 2,000 women serving. Several units saw combat, notably in the battles of Tampere, Helsinki, Vyborg, Antrea and Syrjäntaka. Captured women who were considered to be armed fighters would usually be shot and were sometimes raped before their execution.
- 1919–1922: Greco-Turkish War (1919–1922). Halide Edib Adıvar was granted the ranks of first corporal and then sergeant in the nationalist army. She traveled to the fronts, worked in the headquarters of İsmet Pasha, Commander of the Western Front and wrote her impressions of the scorched earth policy of the invading Greek army and the Greek atrocities in Western Anatolia in her book "The Turkish Ordeal".

=== World War I ===
- Austria: Viktoria Savs serves as a soldier in the imperial Austrian army in the guise of a man and is awarded with the Medal for Bravery (Austria-Hungary) for valor in combat for her service in the Dolomitian front.
- Australia: More than 3,000 Australian civilian nurses volunteer for active service.

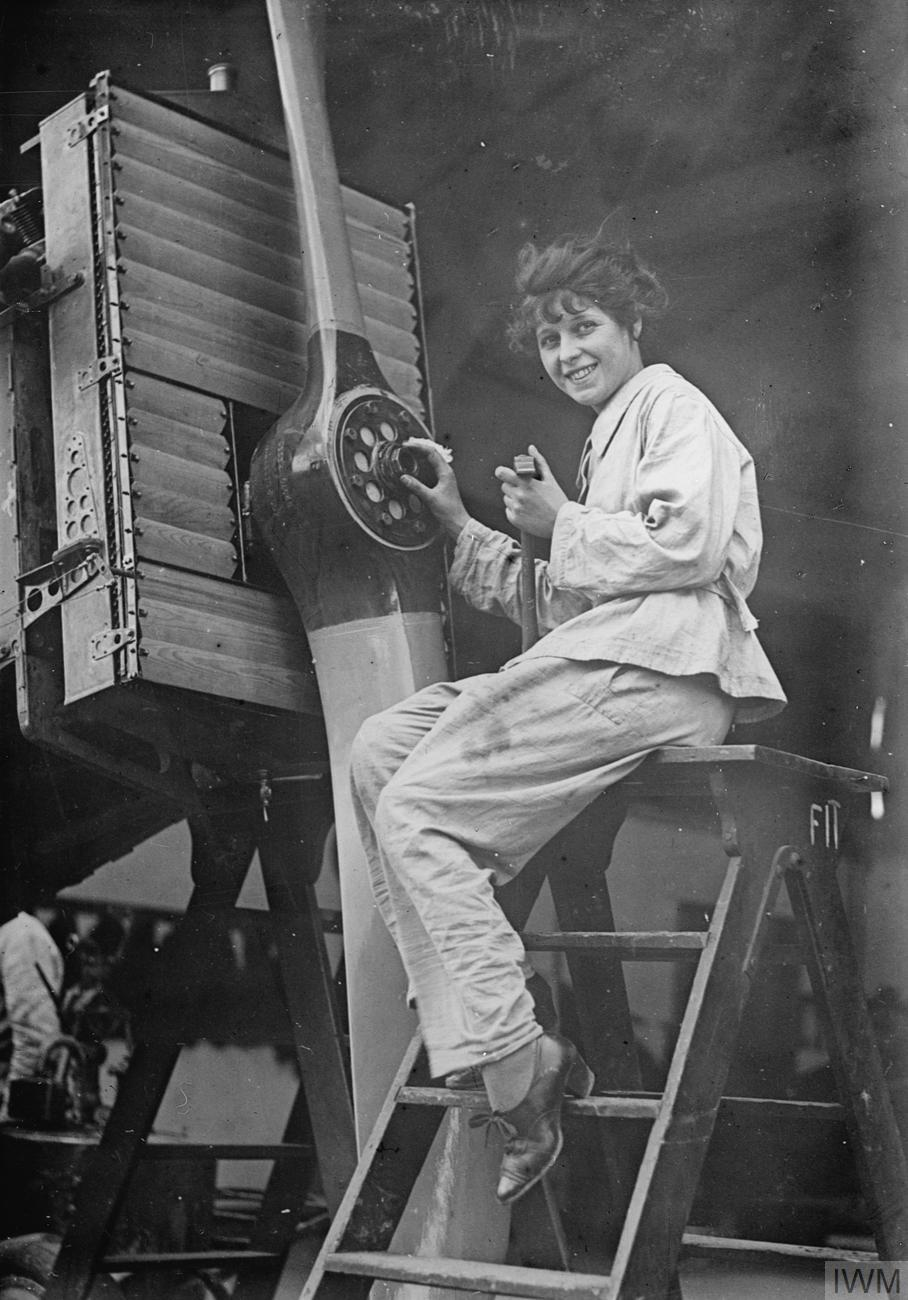
A fitter of the Women's Royal Air Force working on the Liberty engine of a De Havilland Airco DH.9A.

- Britain: The British form the Women's Army Auxiliary Corps in 1917; the Corps is renamed the Queen Mary's Army Auxiliary Corps in 1918. Members of this corps serve as clerical staff, cooks and medical personnel. It is disbanded in September 1921. Also in 1917, the British form the Women's Royal Naval Service as a branch of the Royal Navy. Members of this corps serve as clerks, cooks, electricians and air mechanics. The British disband the unit in 1919.
- Canada: Over 2,800 women serve in the Royal Canadian Army Medical Corps during the war. Women also receive training in small arms, first aid and vehicle maintenance in anticipation of being used as home guards.
- New Zealand: Nurses in the New Zealand Army Nursing Service serve on hospital ships and in hospitals at the front in France.
- Romania: During the 1916 battle in the Jiu Valley, Ecaterina Teodoroiu transfers from the Romanian Army's all-female nurse corps to the Reconnaissance Corps. She is taken prisoner while serving as a scout, but escapes after killing several German soldiers. In November she is wounded and hospitalized, but returns to the front; she is decorated, promoted to Sublocotenent (second lieutenant) and given the command of a 25-man platoon. For her valor she is awarded the Military Virtue Medal, First Class. On 3 September 1917 (22 August Old Style) she is killed in the Battle of Mărăşeşti (in Vrancea County) after being hit in the chest by German machine-gun fire. According to some accounts, her last words before dying were "Forward, men, I'm still with you!"
- Russia: Russia fields 15 formations of female battalions for several months in 1917; two (the 1st Russian Women's Battalion of Death and the Perm Battalion) are deployed to the front. By the end of the year, all battalions are dissolved.
- United States: The United States Navy formally accepts women nurses into the Nurse Corps. The first twenty women are known collectively as the Sacred Twenty.

=== 1920s ===
- 1920: During the Turkish War of Independence, Kara Fatma and her group conducted operations against occupying Allied troops. According to the columnist Yılmaz Özdil, her unit was one of the first to enter İzmir during the Liberation of İzmir from the Greeks on 9 September 1922 Şerife Bacı participated in transport of ammunition needed in the Greco-Turkish War.
- 1924: The Swedish Women's Voluntary Defence Organization is founded.
- 1928: Kang Keqing joins the Red Army, and later becomes a leading figure in it. Men said of her ″'Her thoughts are as clear and direct as bullets fired from a machine-gun.'″

=== 1930s ===
- 1936: During the Spanish Civil War, women militia members known as milicianas fight on the front lines with men (primarily on the Republican side).
- 1937: During the Dersim uprising, Sabiha Gökçen (the first female aviator in Turkey) carries out sorties in operations against the guerrillas.
- 1939: The Women's Royal Naval Service (WRNS) of Britain, disbanded after World War One, is re-founded.

=== 1940s ===
- 1941–1945 – Captain Mary Parker Converse, the first woman to be commissioned by the United States Merchant Marine (USMM), taught navigation to officers in the U.S. Navy Reserve during World War II.
- 1942 – Susan Ahn Cuddy became the first Asian-American woman to join the U.S. Navy.
- 1942–1945 – the Indian National Army allies with the Japanese during the Second World War. The all-female Rani of Jhansi Regiment was formed within the Indian National Army. Notable members of it included Janaky Athi Nahappan, and Rasammah Bhupalan.
- 1944 – Harriet Pickens and Frances Wills became the first African-American women commissioned by the United States Navy.
- Eta Wrobel leads a Jewish partisan unit in Poland during WW2

== See also ==
- Women in warfare and the military (1945–1999)
- Women in warfare and the military (2000–present)
- Women in warfare and the military in the 19th century
- Women in World War I
- Women in World War II
