= Miras (Metin Yurdanur) =

Sculpture in Ankara

- The Heritage (English)
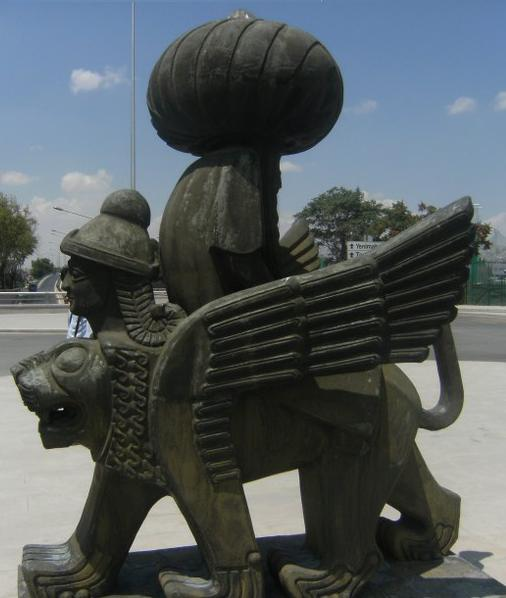
- Artist: Metin Yurdanur
- Year: 1979
- Medium: Bronze sculpture
- Subject: Nasreddin Hodja
- Location: Altındağ, Ankara, Turkey
- 39°56′10″N 32°50′39″E
- Owner: Ankara Metropolitan Municipality
- Followed by: Eller

Miras, is a sculpture by Turkish sculptor Metin Yurdanur. It is famous for being the first civilian sculpture in Ankara. The work describes Nasreddin Hodja on a Hittite Chimera.

== History ==
In 1979, the Ankara Metropolitan Municipality had initiated "the project of equipping the city with plastic elements" and ordered a series of sculptures to decorate different parts of Ankara. Created by several sculptors, including Yurdanur, these works were delivered to the municipality in the same year. Within the scope of this project, the artist's "Heritage" was placed in the garden of Ankara Train Station, "Eller" was placed in Abdi İpekçi Park and "Solidarity" was placed in a square in Batıkent.

== Details ==
With this sculpture, two important cultural figures belonging to Anatolia were engraved and it was pointed out that the Anatolian civilisations, that lived on the same land at different times, were the successors and inheritors of each other. In the work, the folk hero Nasreddin Hodja, who is famous for riding his donkey upside down, is depicted riding a winged and double-headed Hittite lion.

When glance at the general characteristics of the work, it can be seen that an abstract expression technique is used and the gist wanted to be given is reinforced with references to different elements. The materiality of the sculpture is strengthened with the geometric and sharp details used. The depiction of Nasreddin Hodja on a lion instead of a donkey, on the one hand, builds a bridge between different ages, on the other hand transforms Hodja into a figure of a "voyager travelling in time".
