= Metin Yurdanur =

Turkish sculptor (born 1951)

- Born: 1951 (age 74–75); Sivrihisar, Eskişehir Province, Turkey
- Known for: Sculpture
- Awards: State Artist of Turkey
- Website: www.metinyurdanur.com.tr/en/index.html

Metin Yurdanur (born 1951) is a sculptor based in Turkey, who was awarded the title State Artist of Turkey.

== Early years ==
Yurdanur was born in 1951 in Sivrihisar town of Eskişehir Province in Turkey. He spent his childhood until high school in his hometown. He was impressed by antique works of art, especially by the three-millennium old Phrygian reliefs, that inspired him for plastic arts.

After finishing the high school, he enrolled as a boarding student in the Department of Arts at Gazi Institute for Education in Ankara, what is today the Faculty of Vocational Education at Gazi University. He was educated in arts and graduated in 1972 as a high school teacher for arts.

He was appointed in Isparta, where in 1973 he made a monument of Mustafa Kemal Atatürk in commemoration of the 50th anniversary of the foundation of the Republic. He then served as drawing teacher at a high school in Mihalıççık town in Eskişehir Province. In 1978, he was appointed as the sculpting teacher at his alma mater.

In 1979 the city administration requested he create mockups, which later were realized sculptures like "Eller" (The Hands) in Abdi İpekçi Park,"Nasreddin Hoca Riding the Hittite Lion Backwards" at Railroad Station Square, "Dayanışma" (Solidarity) in Batıkent and "Balerinler" (The Ballet Dancers) in Kavaklıdere.

== Sculptor career ==
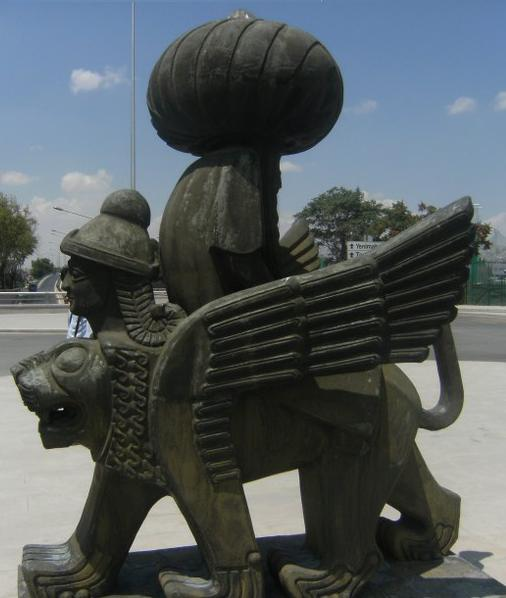
Statue of Nasreddin Hoca Riding Hittite Lion Backwards by Metin Yurdanur in Ankara.

In 1981, he left his teaching position and opened his own workshop. His first work was the sculpture of "Nasreddin Hoca shows the Center of the World" in his hometown.

Metin Yurdanur became proficient in casting statues using conventional techniques. Many monuments, statues and reliefs of Yurdanur are found throughout Turkey, mostly in Ankara. He also has works in several countries around the world.

In 2005, he opened his first individual open-air monument and statue exhibition in Ankara called I am Anatolia, I am the Republic, I am the People. At the exhibition, the polyester mock-ups of his larger-than-life statues and busts were shown, of people from Turkey's history such as Atatürk, İsmet İnönü, Abidin Dino, Karacaoğlan, Yaşar Kemal, Şerife Bacı, Muzaffer Sarısözen and others.

In 2016, Yurdanur opened the first sculpture museum of Turkey in Sivrihisar.

Metin Yurdakul was awarded the title State Artist of Turkey in 1998.

== Works ==
in Turkey

- Miras (The Heritage), Ankara (1979)
- Eller (The Hands), Abdi İpekçi Park, Ankara (1979)
- Dayanışma (Solidarity), Ankara (1980)
- Nasreddin Hoca, Sivrihisar (1985)
- Çay ve Horon (Tea and Horon), Rize (1987)
- Kaynak (The Water Spring), Ankara (1989)
- Çocukların Kardeşliği (Fraternity of Children), Ankara (1990)
- İnsan Hakları (Human Rights), Ankara (1990)
- Aşık Paşa, Kırşehir (1990)
- Madenci (The Miner), Olgunlar Street, Ankara (1991)
- Dans (Dance), Ankara (1991)
- Balerinler (The Ballet Dancers), Kavaklıdere, Ankara (1992)
- Monument of Çanakkale, Çanakkale (1992)
- At (Equine), Antalya (1992)
- Karacaoğlan, Mersin (1992)
- Aşık Veysel, Şarkışla (1993)
- Muzaffer Sarısözen Monument, Ankara (1993)
- Monument of July 2nd, Saraçlar Village, Sivas (1993)
- Monument of Finance Ministry, Ankara (1994)
- Abidin Dino, Istanbul (1994)
- Monument of Osmangazi Konuralp, Akçakoca (1993)
- Yaşar Kemal, Istanbul (1994)
- Üzüm Çiğneyen Kız (The Grape Crushing Girl), Kahta (1994)
- Seyit Hüseyin, Tunceli (1994)
- Melih Cevdet Anday, İstanbul (1994)
- Alaeddin Keykubad, Alanya (1995)
- Monument of Constitutional Court, Ankara (1995)
- İsmet and Mevhibe İnönü, Garden of Pembe Köşk, Ankara (1995)
- İnsan Hakları /Human Rights), Tunceli (1996)
- Kurtuluşa Doğru (Towards Independence), İnebolu (1997)
- Monument of GATA, Ankara (1997)
- Nene Hatun, Erzurum (1998)
- Monument of 75th Anniversary of the Republic, Rize (1998)
- Cybele series (1998)
- Monument of December 27th, Ankara (2000)
- Relief of Anatolia, the Cradle of Civilizations and Law, Ankara Supreme Court of Appeals of Turkey, Ankara (2000)
- Monument of Duatepe, Polatlı, Ankara province (2000)
- Monument of TESK, Confederation of Turkish Tradesmen and Craftsmen), Ankara (2001)
- Dadaloğlu, Kırşehir (2002)
- Monument of Youth, Trabzon (2003)
- Monument of Black Sea Technical University, Trabzon (2004)
- José Martí, Ankara (2006)
- Miners series, (2008)
- Relief of Capital Ankara and Our Turkey, Ministry of Culture, Ankara (2009)
- Monument of Republic, Gençlik Parkı, Ankara (2009)

Abroad

- Al Gardabia, Sirte, Libya (1989)
- Sun's Course, Bonn, Germany (1989)
- Suleiman the Magnificent (1994) and Nikola Šubić Zrinski (1997), Hungarian-Turkish Friendship Park, Szigetvár, Hungary
- Gül Baba, Budapest, Hungary (1996)
- Equestrian Atatürk, Kashiwazaki, Niigata, Japan (1996) - moved in 2010 to Kushimoto, Wakayama
- Atatürk, Havana, Cuba (2008)
