= Eller (sculpture) =

Outdoor sculpture in Ankara by Metin Yurdanur

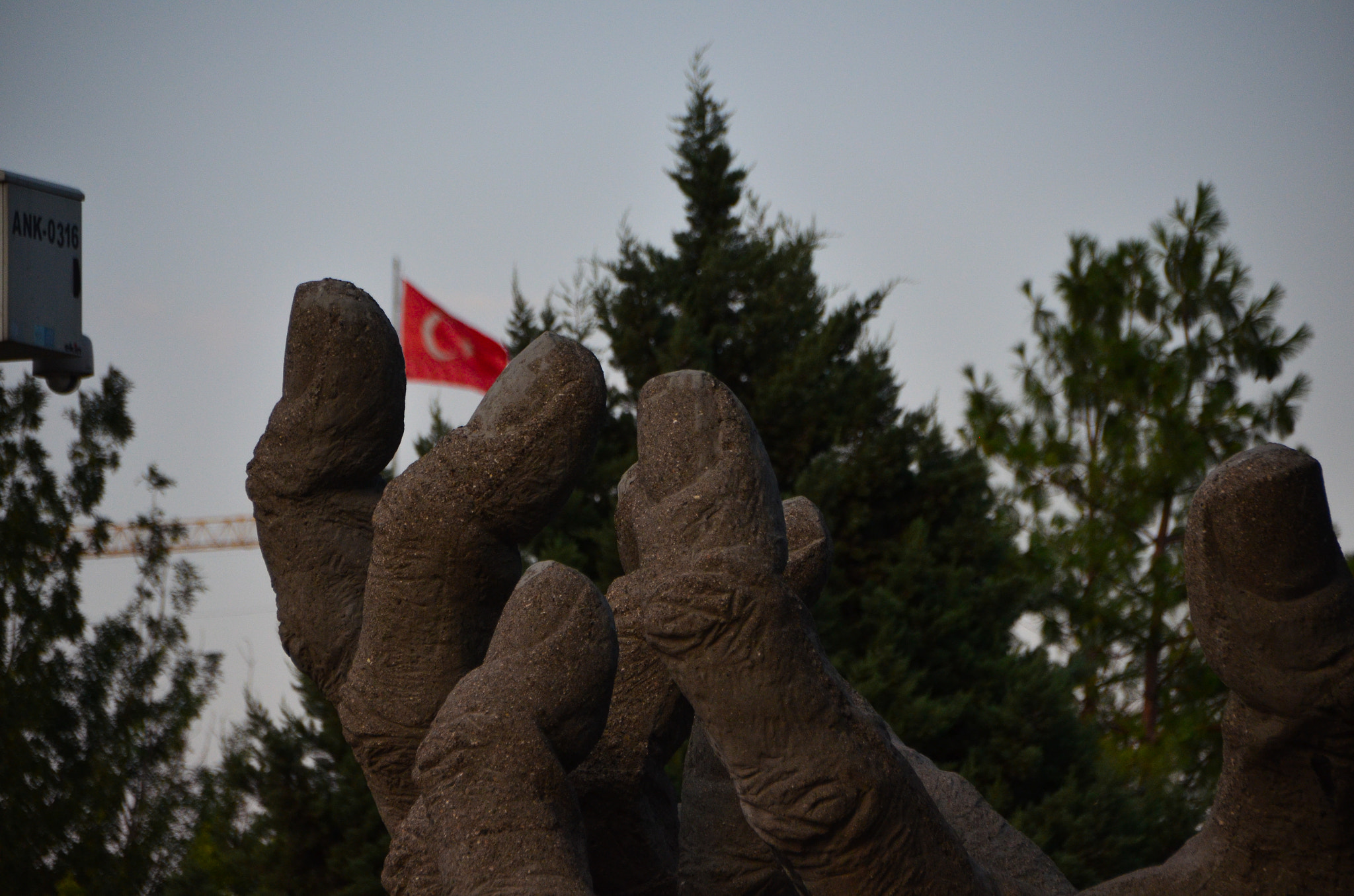
- Eller in the Abdi İpekçi Park, Ankara
- Interactive map of Eller
- Location: Abdi İpekçi Park, Ankara
- Coordinates: 39.927717°N 32.856264°E
- Designer: Metin Yurdanur
- Material: Poured concrete on metal frame
- Completion date: 1979

Eller is a 1979 sculpture by Metin Yurdanur located in the Abdi İpekçi Park in Ankara.

The sculpture was made by Metin Yurdanur in 1979 for the Abdi İpekçi Park. About the sculpture, Yurdanur stated "i see the hands as part of the brain and the eyes." The sculpture is made from poured concrete over a metal construction.

It was initiated as part of an initiative towards the end of the 70's by the Mayor of the Ankara Municipality, Ali Dinçer. The initiative aimed to put sculptures free in topic around the public spaces of the city.

The last pouring of the concrete for the sculpture was done before the 12 September coup. Yurdanur was worried, particularly due to the warm temperature at the time, that he would not be able to water the concrete due to the ban on going outside during the coup. As soon as the ban was lifted he went to water the concrete.

The sculpture was renovated/refreshed by Yurdanur himself, 43 years after its initial opening. Yurdanur stated that "It is important for living artists to overhaul their own works years later."
