= Hungarian-Turkish Friendship Park =

Park in Hungary

Hungarian-Turkish Friendship Park Magyar-Török Barátság Park
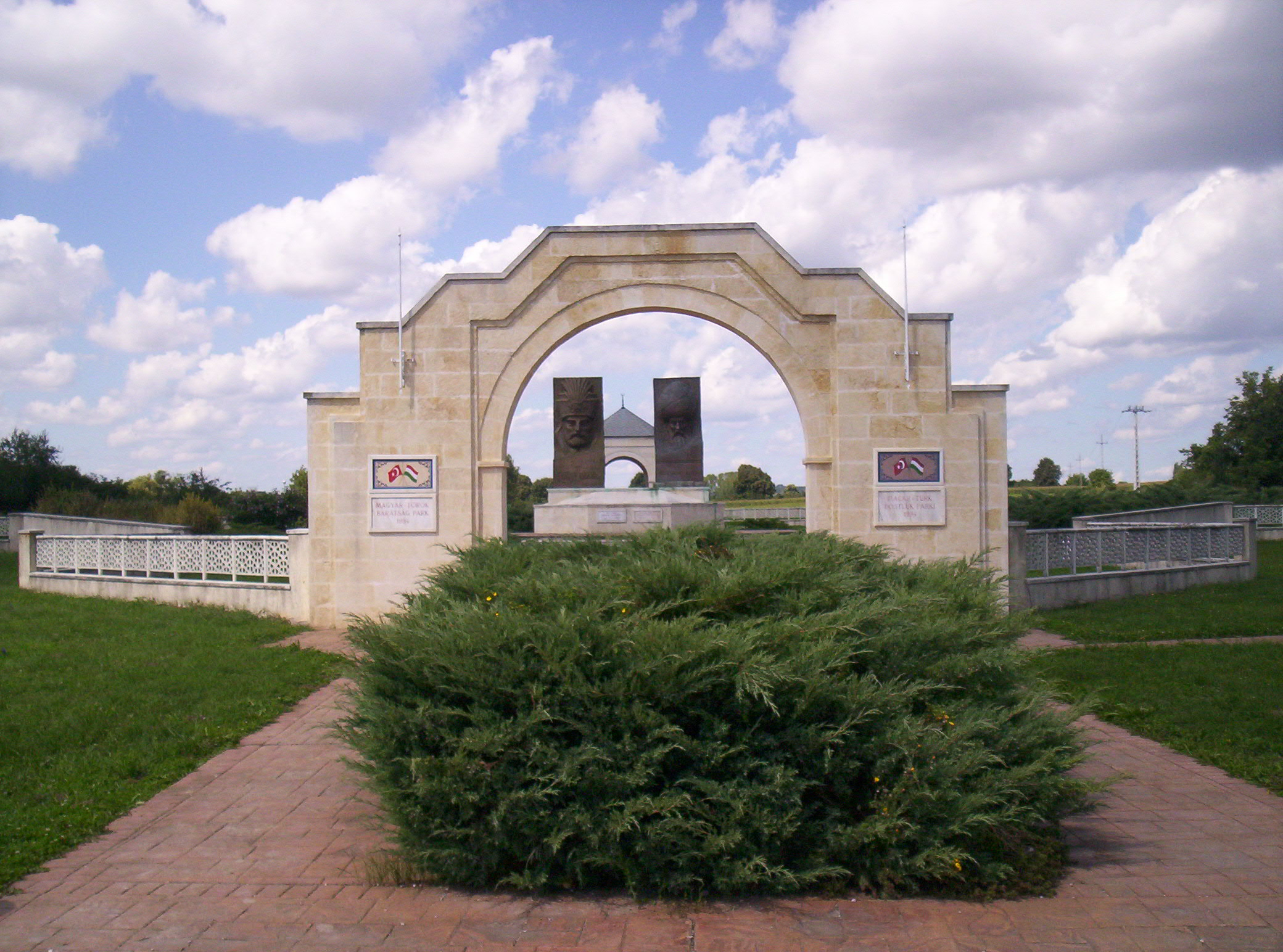
- Gate of the Hungarian Turkish Friendship Park in Csertő

- Location within Hungary
- Location: Hungary
- Nearest city: Szigetvár
- Coordinates: 46°04′26″N 17°48′50″E
- Area: 1 acre (4,000 m^{2})
- Created: 1994; 32 years ago
- Open: All-year long

The Hungarian-Turkish Friendship Park (Hungarian: Magyar-Török Barátság Park, Turkish: Macar-Türk Dostluk Parkı) is a public park in Csertő, southwestern Hungary, dedicated in memorial to the Battle of Szigetvár fought in 1566 between the Ottoman Empire and the Hungarian and Croatian defenders of the Szigetvár Castle. The park was established in 1994 and opened jointly by Hungarian and Turkish officials.

== Background ==
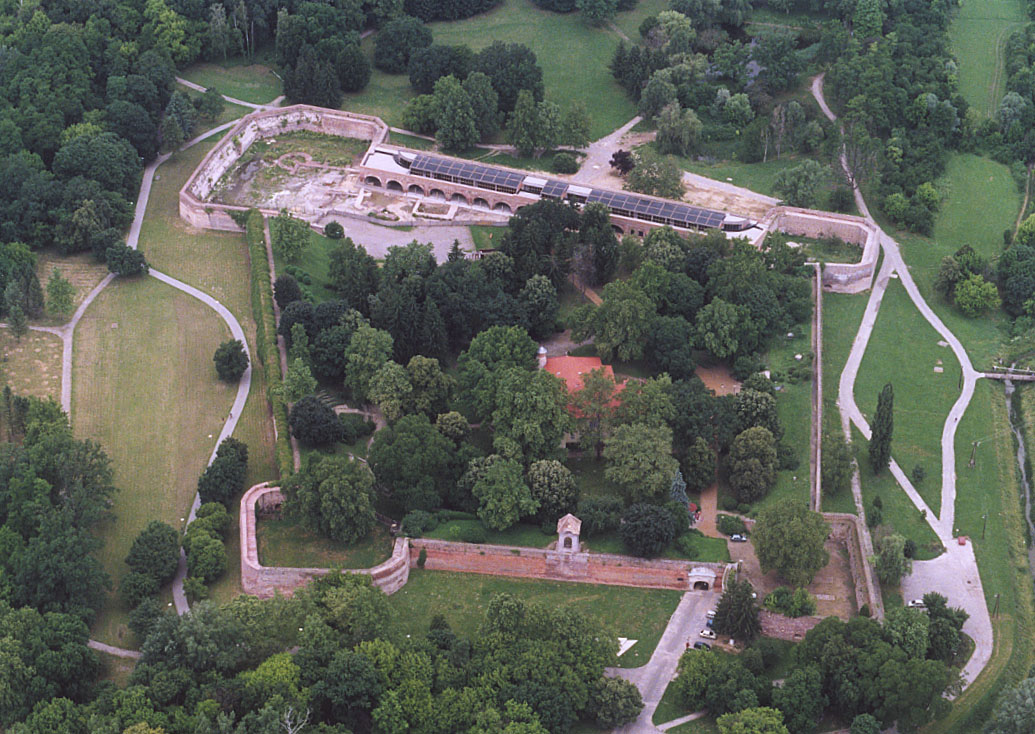
Castle of Szigetvár

Leading his army in person, Ottoman Sultan Suleiman the Magnificent besieged Szigetvár Castle in Baranya (near the present day Hungarian and Croatian border) with his military force of more than 80,000 soldiers in the summer of 1566. The fortification blocked his way westwards towards Vienna on his second attempt to capture the capital of Habsburg Austria. The battle lasted from August 6 till September 8, while the castle was defended by greatly outnumbered, some 2,500 Croatian and Hungarian soldiers of the Croatian nobleman Nikola IV Zrinski.

On September 6, Sultan Suleiman unexpectedly died of natural causes at the age of 72 in his big imperial tent beside the battlefield. While his death was kept secret at great effort, Ottoman Grand Vizier Sokollu Mehmed Pasha, the acting operational commander, continued to lead the battle. Shortly after Suleiman's death, Zrinski was killed in action during the final battle, and the castle fell into the hands of the Ottomans. The Ottomans cancelled the Vienna campaign and the troops returned home without knowing about the death of their ruler.

Szigetvár remained under Ottoman control for 122 years. Between 1596 and 1600, the town was capital of the Ottoman Empire's Sigetvar Eyalet and then became part of the Kanije Eyalet.

During this period, the Ottomans built mosques, hammams and schools. There still exist some buildings in the town dating back to Ottoman time whereas some of the monuments were demolished after recapture by the Habsburg Hungary.

== Friendship park ==
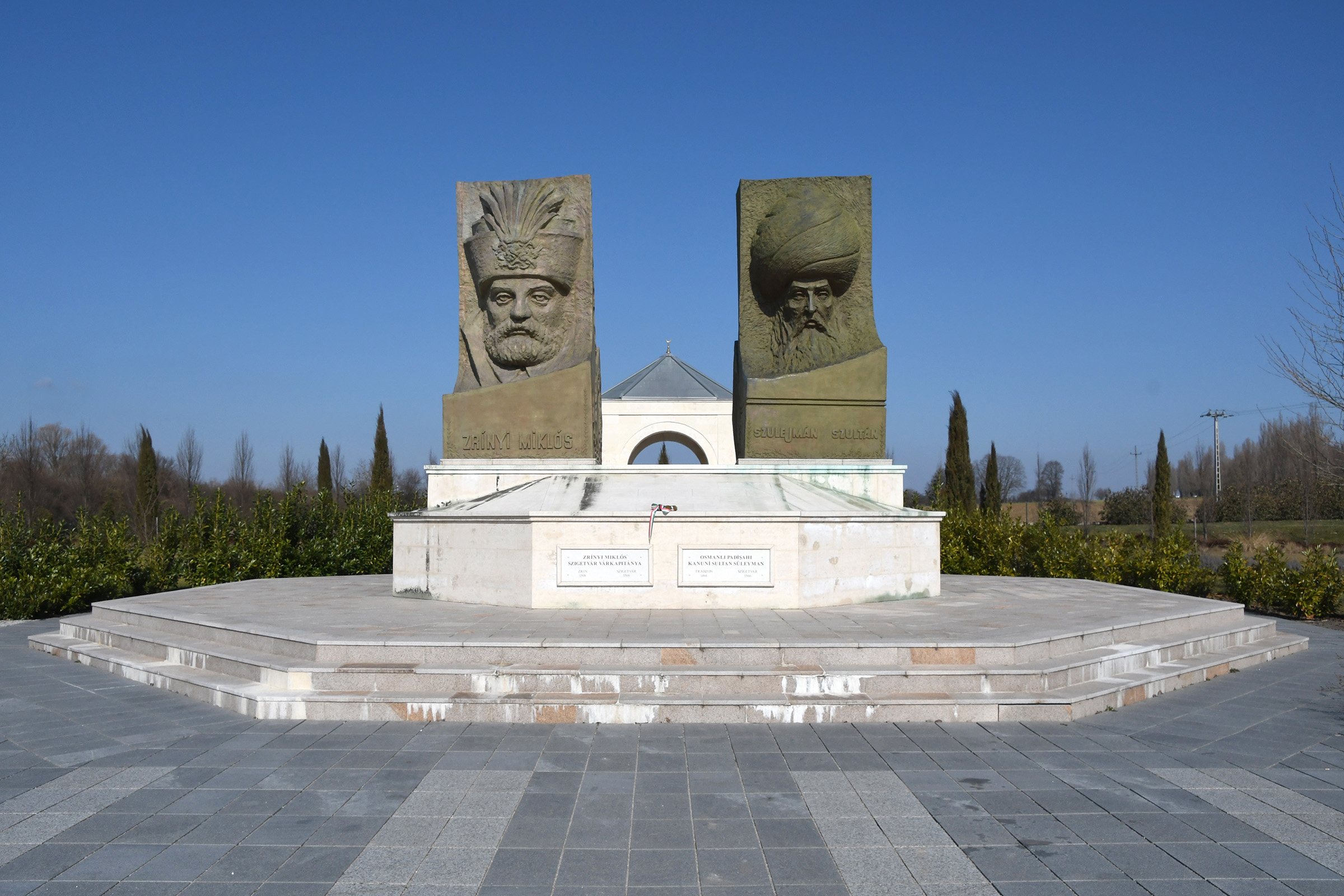
Head sculptures of Nikola IV Zrinski (left) and Sultan Suleiman (right) with the symbolic tomb seen in the background at the Hungarian Turkish Friendship Park, Csertő

It is assumed that the heart and the intestines of Sultan Suleiman were removed following his death and buried somewhere in Szigetvár before his embalmed corpse was taken back to the Empire's capital on a more-than-two-month-long trek.

Close to the spot where the heart of Sultan Suleiman is thought to be buried, a friendship park was established on the 500th anniversary of Sultan Suleiman's birth upon the initiative and with the subsidy of the Republic of Turkey. The park was jointly inaugurated by Hungarian Minister of Education Gábor Fodor and Turkish President Süleyman Demirel in September 1994.

The friendship park is situated about 2–3 km (1.2–1.9 mi) northeast of the town on the left-hand side of the road to Kaposvár and is accessible by bus. The park measures about 60 m × 60 m (200 ft × 200 ft) in dimensions making an area of around 1 acre (4,000 m^{2}). Open to visitors all year long, the park has a triumphal arch-like gate and is walled by a waist-high oriental ornamented fence. 6.50 m (21.3 ft) high monumental head statues of the military rivals Nikola IV Zrinski and Sultan Suleiman, who died at the site, are erected side by side on shared plinth in the centre of the park. The sculptures in bronze, created by Turkish sculptor Metin Yurdanur, and the marbles were given by the Turkish Ministry of Culture and Tourism. The construction cost about HUF 60 million (approx. US$269,000). The park area itself is leased to the Turkish government for a symbolic annual rental price of HUF 1 for a time span of 99 years, beginning 1994.

In 1996, a drinking fountain in Ottoman architectural style was built in the park with its tiles and marbles sent from Turkey. The park includes also a symbolic grave for Sultan Suleiman's intestines, a symbolic marble türbe, big sculptures of Szigetvár's coat of arms and the tughra of Sultan Suleiman.

== Search for burial place of Suleiman's heart ==
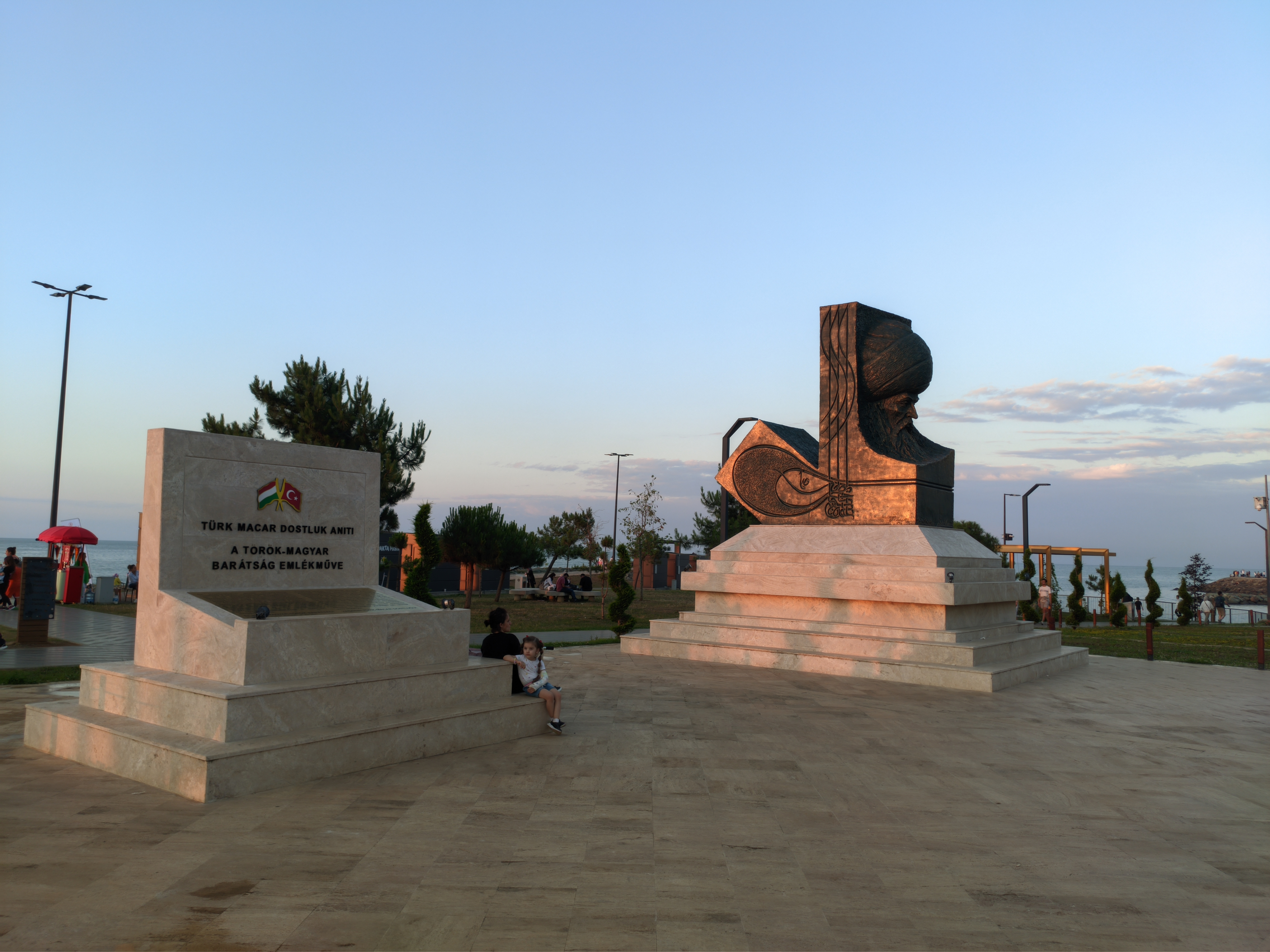
Monuments in the Turkish-Hungarian Friendship Park, which was opened as a sister park in Trabzon, the birthplace of Suleiman.

Even though there is no historical evidence to indicate the burial of Sultan Suleiman's heart in Szigetvár, Norbert Pap, a Hungarian historical geography scientist at the University of Pécs, began carrying out excavation at an undisclosed location in the area. The project is financed by the Turkish state.

== Criticism ==
When it was opened, the establishment of the park caused objection across Hungary, because it included only the larger-than-life head sculpture of Sultan Suleiman. In 1997, the bust of Nikola IV Zrinski was commissioned to the same sculptor. Its placement of side-by-side, rather than confronting one another, helped to calm down the protesters.
