= Şerife Bacı =

Turkish folk heroine

Şerife Ana
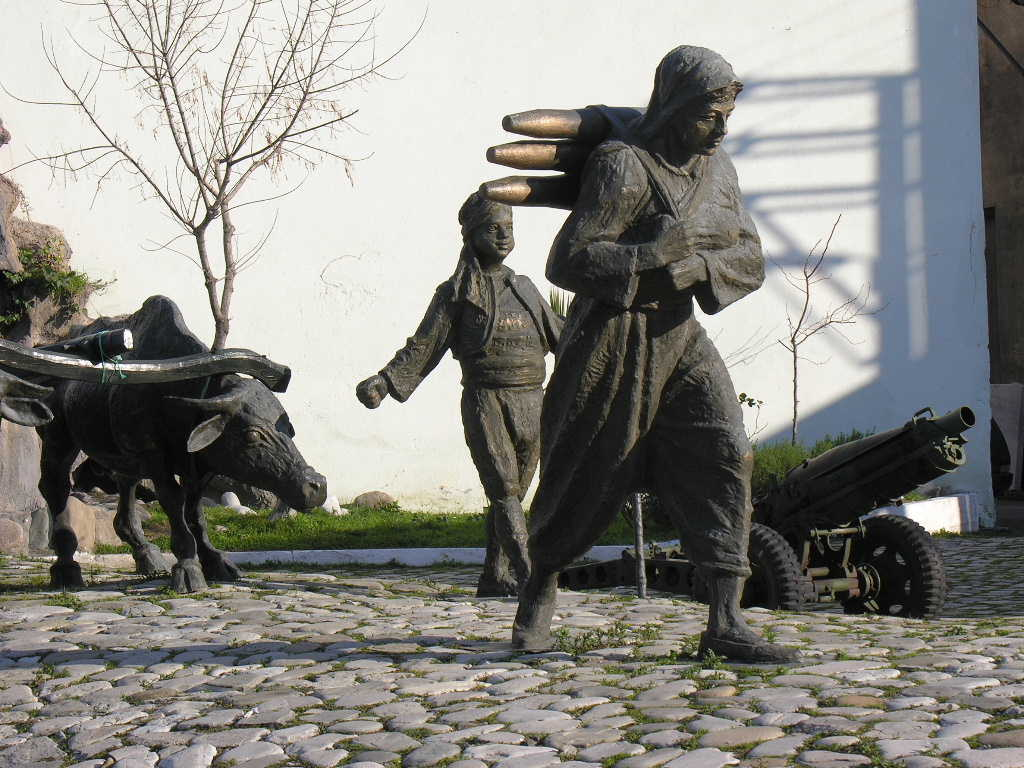
- Statue of Şerife Bacı by Metin Yurdanur in the coastal park of İnebolu.
- Born: c. 1900
- Died: December 1921; Kastamonu
- Military career
- Allegiance: Ottoman Empire; Turkey

Şerife Bacı (literally: Sister Şerife), aka Şerife Kadın for "Mrs. Şerife", (born c. 1900 – died December 1921) was a Turkish folk heroine, who took part in the Turkish War of Independence, and was declared a martyr due to her death during the war.

== Early life ==
She was born in a village in the Seydiler district of Kastamonu Vilayet. Her birth date is not known for certain. However, she was sixteen years old when she got married. Two months after her wedding, World War I broke out, and her husband was recruited. Six months later, she learnt of the death of her husband in the Gallipoli Campaign (1915–16). The villagers arranged her re-marriage to a wounded war veteran named Topal Yusuf (literally: Yusuf the Lame), who had lost his left leg and an eye in a bomb explosion at the front. In the third year of her re-marriage, Şerife Gelin (literally: Bride Şerife) as she was called, gave birth to a daughter named Elif. Şerife was a helpful person for almost everyone and every work in the village.

== Death ==
In the winter of 1921, the villagers were called to help transport ammunition needed in the Greco-Turkish War. She was on a trek together with her child and some other women carrying cannonballs on her oxen-driven tumbrel from İnebolu to Ankara. She was found dead shortly before the Kastamonu Barracks, perished from cold due to severe winter conditions in December 1921.

== Recognition ==
In memorial of the 50th anniversary of the foundation of the Republic, the district mayor of Seydiler built 1973 a relief in her honor. In 1990, a monument by Tankut Öktem depicting Atatürk, Şerife Bacı and the women of Kastamonu in the War of Independence was placed in the Republic Square of the city. A monument in honor of "Martyr Şerife Bacı" was erected in the public park on the coast of İnebolu, commissioned by the General Commander of the Gendarmerie Aytaç Yalman and created by sculptor Metin Yurdanur. Its inauguration took place on December 4, 2001.

Martyr Şerife Bacı is a symbol of the heroic Turkish women in the War of Independence.

Many institutions such as schools and hospitals are named after her in Kastamonu and other cities in Turkey.

In February 2012, twelve of the initially planned forty women from Kastamonu hiked the distance of 105 km (65 mi) from İnebolu to Kastamonu in three days under winter conditions to commemorate Şerife Bacı's deadly trek 91 years ago.
