= Josephine Okwuekeleke Tolefe =

Nigerian first female commissioned officer

Captain Josephine Okwuekeleke Tolefe
- Born: December 15, 1931
- Died: 2014 (Aged 83)
- Education: Midwives Training College, High Coombe Surrey, United Kingdom
- Occupation: Former Nigerian Military Officer
- Years active: 1961–1967

Captain Josephine Okwuekeleke Tolefe (born December 15, 1931, in Aniocha, Delta State, Nigeria) was the first female commissioned officer in the Nigerian Army. She was the first female military officer and the first female to attain the rank of an Army Captain in Nigeria.

== Personal life and educational background ==
Tolefe was born on 15 December 1931 in Ogwashi-Ukwu, the southern part of Aniocha in Delta State, Nigeria. She attended Midwives Training College, High Coombe Surrey, United Kingdom to study Nursing and graduated as a registered nurse under the General Nursing Council for England and Wales in August, 1956.

== Career ==
Tolefe was a professional nurse but she decided to join the Nigerian Army because she was impressed by the look of the women in the British Army and the way they defended their country. After joining the Army, she was appointed as Second Lieutenant in 1961. Two years after, she was appointed Army Captain.

Although Tolefe was celebrated, she and her female colleagues faced many gender-related challenges. She retired voluntarily from service on 5 February 1967 and died in 2014.
