= Roza Papo =

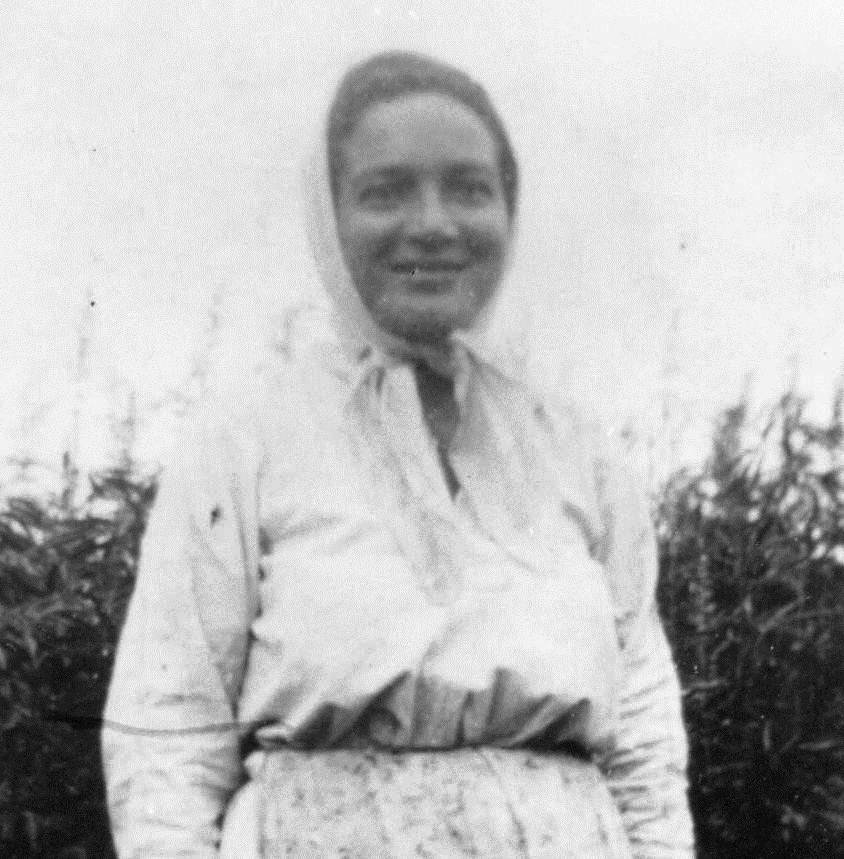
- Roza Papo in 1943
- Born: 6 February 1914; Sarajevo, Austria-Hungary
- Died: 25 February 1984 (aged 70); Belgrade, Yugoslavia
- Education: University of Zagreb; Medical School
- Children: 2
- Military career
- Allegiance: Yugoslav Partisans; Yugoslav People's Army
- Branch: Yugoslav People's Army
- Service years: 1941–1970s
- Rank: Major general
- Unit: Medical Service
- Known for: First woman to attain the rank of general in the Balkans
- Conflicts: World War II
- Awards: Commemorative Medal of the Partisans of 1941; Order of Bravery; Order of Merits for the People; Order of the Yugoslav Army; Order of Brotherhood and Unity; Order of Military Merit with a Big Star

Roza Papo (1914–1984) was a Bosnian physician and general of the Yugoslav People's Army. She was the first woman to rise to the rank of general on the Balkan Peninsula.

== Early life ==
Roza Papo was born on 6 February 1914 into a Sephardi Jewish family in Sarajevo. Her mother, Mirjama Papo (born Abinun), was the daughter of a rabbi from Gračanica.

Roza Papo studied at the Faculty of Medicine, University of Zagreb in Croatia and worked as physician in Sarajevo, Begov Han and Olovo before the outbreak of the Second World War.

== War service ==
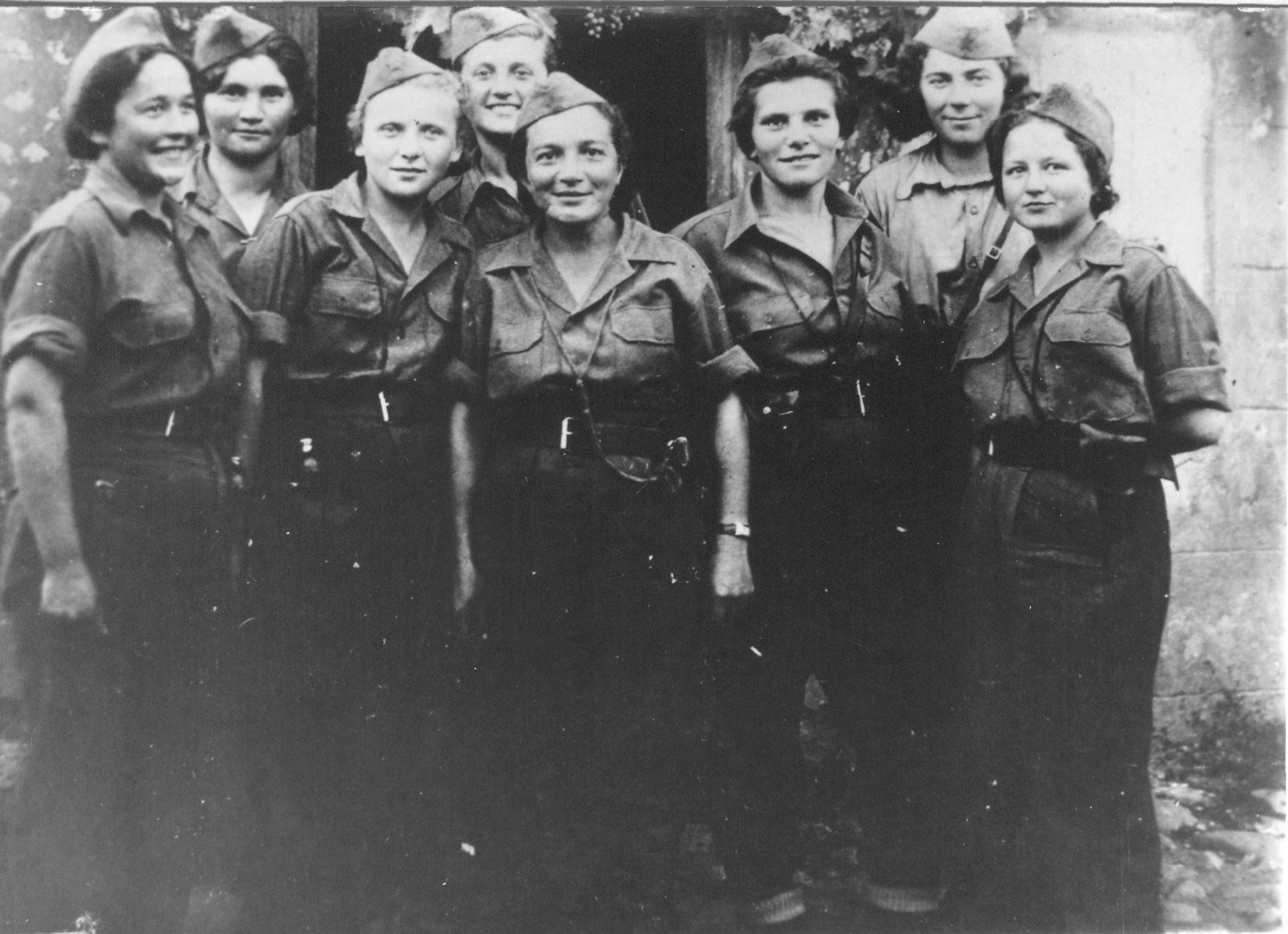
Papo with comrades in Guča, 1944

Following the invasion of Yugoslavia by Nazi Germany in 1941, Papo made contact with the Yugoslav Partisans in Ozren and started aiding them. Jews throughout Europe joined resistance movements in an attempt to survive, but Papo's decision was also motivated by patriotism. Papo officially joined the Partisans in December 1941. The following year, she also became a member of the Communist Party of Yugoslavia. During the war, she contracted typhus, and during a battle in Ozren in 1942, she was slightly wounded in the face by an airplane bomb.

As an officer, Papo served directly under Josip Broz Tito, the leader of the Yugoslav resistance. She led the recruitment system and commanded the network of the different Partisan field hospitals. Not wishing to be seen as a coward, she refused to take shelter during an air raid in 1942 and nearly lost an eye. She reached the rank of captain in 1943 and was a major by 1945.

== Post-war career ==
The Partisans emerged victorious from the Second World War in 1945, but Papo's parents and both siblings had been killed. Her mother and all four aunts were killed in concentration camps. Upon returning to Sarajevo, Papo lived in a hotel, but soon moved to Belgrade to specialize in infectology. Papo continued her career as physician in the army, and became the first head of the Military Medical Academy. She formulated the first criteria for the selection of military physicians. Having published over 50 papers, she became a professor at the academy in 1965. Rosa Papo was one of the first infectologists in Yugoslavia. She is credited with introducing new diagnostic methods, primarily liver biopsies, as well as the introduction of precise diagnosis of viral hepatitis and hyperbilirubinemia, as well as tuberculosis and purulent meningitis.

Papo received six medals for her contributions, including the Commemorative Medal of the Partisans of 1941, the Order of Merits for the People, and the Order of Brotherhood and Unity. In 1973, she was promoted to the rank of major general. Yugoslavia at the time had more Jewish generals than Israel, and Papo was the first woman general in all the Balkans. As such, she was affectionately known as "the general with braids".

Papo had a son, who died in 1969, and a daughter. She died on 25 February 1984 in Belgrade.

== Decorations ==
- Commemorative Medal of the Partisans of 1941
- Order of Bravery (October 1944)
- Order of Merits for the People (1952)
- Order of the Yugoslav Army - II degree (1956)
- Order of Brotherhood and Unity - II degree (1960)
- Order of Military Merit with a Big Star (I degree) (1971)
