= Nora Astorga =

Nicaraguan guerrilla, politician, judge, and diplomat

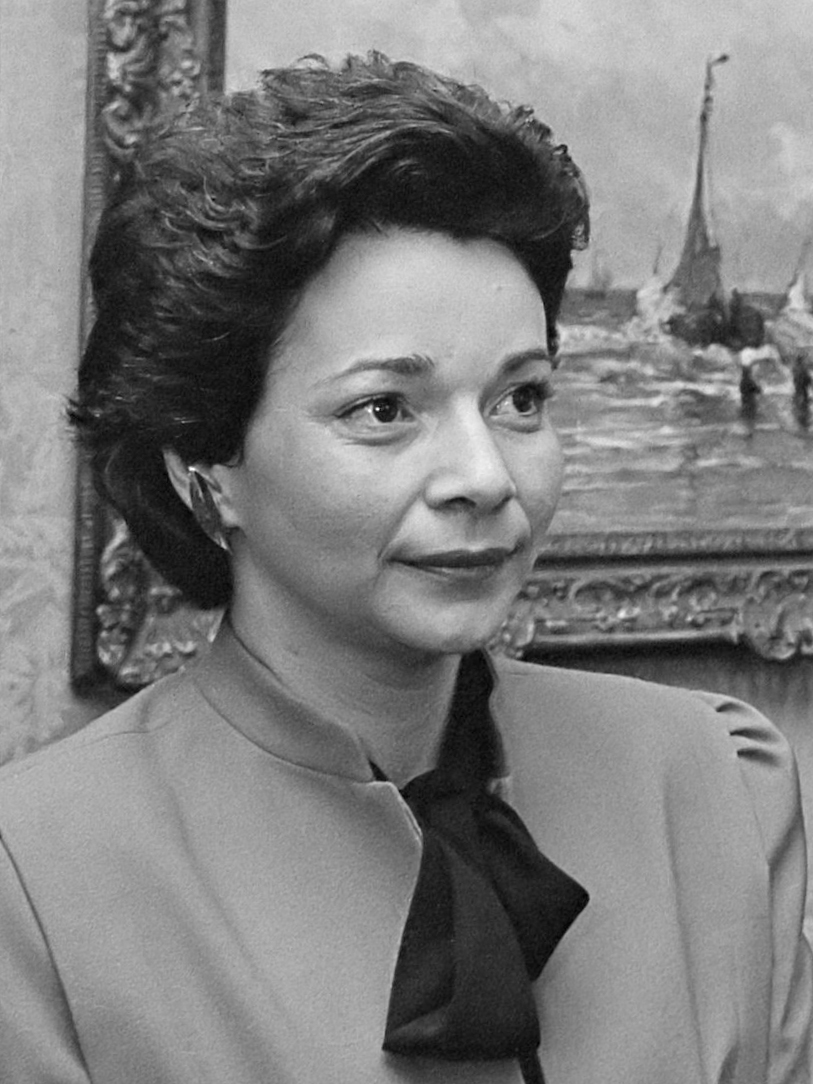

Nicaraguan Ambassador to United Nations
- In office 1986–1988
- President: Daniel Ortega

Personal details
- Born: Nora Josefina Astorga Gadea; 10 December 1948 Managua, Nicaragua
- Died: 14 February 1988 (aged 39) Managua, Nicaragua
- Party: FSLN
- Spouse: Jorge Jenkins
- Children: 4
- Profession: Politician, lawyer, judge

Nora Josefina Astorga Gadea de Jenkins (10 December 1948 – 14 February 1988) was a Nicaraguan guerrilla fighter in the Nicaraguan Revolution, a lawyer, politician, judge, Vice Minister of Justice, and ambassador to the United Nations from 1986 to 1988.

== Early life and education ==
Astorga was born to a religious, upper-middle-class family in Managua. She was the first child of Segundo Astorga, a lumber exporter and rancher with connections to the powerful ruling Somoza family, and his wife, Mierrel Gadea.

In her youth she was a devout Roman Catholic, often doing charitable work in the poor neighborhoods of Managua. In 1967, Astorga announced to her family's dismay that she supported Fernando Agüero, not his opponent Anastasio Somoza Debayle, in the presidential election. For her personal safety and to "straighten her out," her family sent her to study medicine in the United States, where she remained from 1967 to 1969. However, the animal dissections disturbed her and she had to abandon her studies. She said of the years she spent in Washington, D.C., "What impressed me most about the United States were the social contrasts and above all the racism. I had never seen racism like that in Nicaragua ... [m]y political consciousness was born then."

Astorga married Jorge Jenkins when she was 22. Astorga had four children, two with her husband and two with Jose María Alvarado, a member of the Sandinistas.

== A revolutionary ==
"...Revolutions are not exportable like Coca-Cola or paperbacks or something like that... You don't produce it internally and send it away. Revolutions are made in a country when the conditions in that particular country are for a process of change."

— Nora Astorga

Astorga later returned to Nicaragua and studied law at the Universidad Centroamericana in Managua. Her association with Nicaragua's Sandinista revolutionaries began during her years as a university student. From 1969 to 1973, she was responsible for finding safe houses and transportation for the revolutionary leader Oscar Turcios.

At age 22, she married Jorge Jenkins, a student activist. The couple spent the following year in Italy, where he studied anthropology, and she studied banking law and computer programming. They had two children and separated after five years of marriage. During this time, Astorga led a double life as a mother of two and a corporate lawyer for one of Nicaragua's largest construction companies, while clandestinely aiding the Sandinistas. After the assassination of newspaper editor Pedro Chamorro in 1978, Astorga decided to take up arms against the Somoza regime. "I finally understood that armed struggle was the only solution, that a rifle cannot be met with a flower, that we were in the streets, but if that force didn't get organized we wouldn't achieve much", she said. "For me, it was the moment of conviction: either I took up arms and made a total commitment or I wasn't going to change anything."

She gained national attention for her participation in the botched kidnapping and murder of General Reynaldo Pérez Vega (nicknamed "El Perro," or "the dog"). Pérez Vega was deputy commander of Anastasio Somoza's National Guard. On March 8, 1978, Astorga invited the general to her apartment in Managua, hinting to him that the sexual favors he had long sought would be granted. When he arrived, however, three members of the Sandinista National Liberation Front (FSLN) — Hilario Sánchez (1953-1983), Raúl "El Zorro" Venerio Granera (1945-2019) and Walter Ferreti (1956-1988) — burst out of her bedroom closet and seized the general. The plan was to ransom him for jailed Sandinista revolutionaries, but Pérez Vega put up a struggle and was murdered. Later, with his throat slit, he was found wrapped in a Sandinista flag. Astorga said of his murder, "It was not murder. He was too much of a monster."

In an interview shortly before her death, she described her feelings about her role in the Pérez Vega murder this way:

...Sometimes people ask me why I don't have any guilty feelings in regard to "the dog." They want to know how I could do something so fierce without feeling guilty. I believe I don't feel guilty for three reasons. First, we were supposed to kidnap him, not kill him. Second, I wasn't there at the moment of his death. And third, he represented repression. He was practically Somoza's second in command, the one who conducted all those murderous operations in the north, the one who massacred so many in Masaya. He really was a monster. I understood his death as part of the liberation struggle...

— Nora Astorga

She became the subject of a national manhunt and next appeared to the Nicaraguan public on the pages of La Prensa, the nation's opposition newspaper. She was wearing jungle fatigues and carrying an AK-47 assault rifle. Astorga had escaped to the jungle and joined the Sandinista revolutionaries. There, she became pregnant with her third child by José María Alvarado, a leading Sandinista.

== Justice Minister and UN Representative ==
After the Sandinistas took power in July 1979, Astorga was appointed Vice Minister of Justice. In that position she oversaw the trials of some 7,500 members of Somoza's National Guard.

In 1984, her appointment as ambassador to the United States was refused by the Reagan administration because of her involvement in the killing of General Reynaldo Pérez Vega. Vega had been a CIA operative.

Astorga became a deputy representative to the United Nations in 1984, and, in March 1986, became the Nicaraguan ambassador to that body, a position she held until her death in 1988. She was instrumental in getting the United Nations to recognize a ruling by the International Court of Justice, Nicaragua v. United States, that declared the United States' support for the Contras illegal. However, the United States refused to participate in the proceedings, arguing that the ICJ lacked jurisdiction to hear the case and blocked enforcement of the judgment by the United Nations Security Council thus preventing Nicaragua from receiving compensation. Nicaragua, under the later, post-FSLN government of Violeta Chamorro, withdrew the complaint from the court in September 1992 following a repeal of the law which had required the country to seek compensation.

== Death ==
On 14 February 1988, Astorga died of cervical cancer in Managua, aged 39. She was awarded the title "Hero of the Fatherland and Revolution" and the Order of Carlos Fonseca in July 1987, which was the highest order of Nicaragua at the time.

=== Legacy ===
She appears as one of the twelve apostles in the mural of the Visitación at Casa Ave Maria in Managua. A barrio, or neighborhood, in Managua was named for her.

The 1986 song "Mariel" by the KBC Band was inspired by Nora Astorga.
