= Eta Wrobel =

Jewish partisan

- Nickname: The Peddler from Warsaw
- Born: Eta Chajit; December 28, 1916; Łuków, Poland
- Died: May 26, 2008 (aged 91) New York, U.S.
- Conflicts: World War 2; Polish resistance movement in World War II
- Spouse: Henry Wrobel
- Children: Anna Wrobel

Eta Wrobel (December 28, 1916 – May 26, 2008) was a Polish-born American memoirist, Yiddish language activist, and a commander of a Jewish partisan unit in Poland during World War II.

== Early life ==
Eta was born on December 28, 1916, in Łuków, Poland, to a middle-class family of ten children. She was a valedictorian of her high school and her father, Pinchas Ben Chaim Chajit, was a businessman.

== World War II ==
After Poland was taken over by the Nazis, Eta started working as a clerk at a employment agency, where she forged false papers for Jews. One day her pregnant older sister, Mara, was shot dead by Gestapo agents. She also worked as a cleaner, passing on overheard information to resistance members, and at a restaurant in Łódź, where she stole weapons from Nazi patrons when they hung up their coats. The stolen guns were then smuggled back to partisans in Łuków. Due to her work, she was arrested by the Gestapo and imprisoned in Lublin for ten months, where she was beaten and tortured. Wrobel was eventually transferred to work on Majdanek concentration camp. While being transported there, Wrobel escaped into the woods. There, she reunited with her father Pinchas Ben Chaim Chajit, who had escaped from the Łuków ghetto when it was liquidated in October 1942. Her other family members had been sent to the Treblinka extermination camp.

In the local woods, she helped help organize an all Jewish partisan unit numbering 80 fighters, of whom seven were woman. She was later made commander of the unit. Under her command, the unit planted landmines and ambushed Nazis soldiers. In her book My Life, My Way, Wrobel narrated finding a Jewish mother and two children in a shallow grave, who were killed by the Polish Home Army. In retaliation she evacuated and burnt a village controlled by the Polish Home Army. Wrobel also recalled being shot in the leg during a mission; after several months of continued pain from the bullet, she removed it herself using a knife. Following this, she also became a sort of surgeon for the unit.

== Later and personal life ==
Wrobel was the only member of her family to survive the war. After the Germans left Łuków in 1944, Wrobel came out of hiding and was asked to become the town's mayor. She married her husband, Harry Wrobel, in December 1944. The couple left Poland in 1947, immigrating to the United States and settling in Brooklyn, New York, where Wrobel worked as a grocer. Her family later moved to The Bronx and to Kew Gardens, Queens. She lived in Fort Lee, New Jersey, United States, for the final years of her life. In the last year of her life she was awarded by YIVO and the National Yiddish Theatre/Folksbiene for her efforts to keep the Yiddish language alive.

Wrobel had four children and nine grandchildren. She died in 2008 in Highlands, New York, United States.

== Books ==
- My Life My Way: The Extraordinary Memoir of a Jewish Partisan in WWII Poland (2006); co-written with Jeanette Friedman
