= Moheba Khorsheed =

Palestinian fighter and activist

- مهيبة خورشيد

Personal details
- Born: 1925 Jaffa, British Mandatory Palestine
- Died: 2000 (aged 74–75) Jordan
- Other political affiliations: Arab Women's Association of Palestine

Military service
- Commands: The Chrysanthemum Flower
- Battles/wars: 1948 Palestine war

Moheba Khorsheed was a Palestinian activist and leader of the Zahrat al-Uqhawan (The Chrysanthemum Flower in English), an all-female armed group to fight against Zionist paramilitaries in the 1948 Palestine war.

== Early life ==
Khorsheed was born in the Palestinian city of Yaffa in 1925. She studied at the Higher Teachers' Institute in Jerusalem, where she earned a diploma in education. She returned to her hometown of Yaffa, where she taught math at an all-girl secondary school. She later joined the Arab Women's Association of Palestine.

== Founding of The Chrysanthemum Flower and the 1948 Palestine war ==
On February 27, 1947, Khorsheed and her sister Nariman Nihad Khorsheed founded the Chrysanthemum Flower as an all-female political group. Before the war the Chrysanthemum Flower, was actively engaged in providing medical treatment and establishing a welfare network to help students and poor people and promoting interfaith rapprochement. after the outbreak of the 1948 war, the group's role was to raise funds to buy weapons and to provide aid to displaced Palestinian families, but After Khorsheed witnessed a Palestinian boy being killed by a Zionist paramilitary sniper, the group turned into an all-female armed resistance network. Their main activities were ambushing Zionist militants. In one Al-Jazeera interview Khorsheed told a story about how she raided a Zionist paramilitary camp in the middle of the night and killed their leader and captured the others.

== After the war ==
After the fall of Yaffa to Zionist paramilitaries, she was displaced by boat to Egypt. Then, she moved to Lebanon and later to Jordan, where she became a teacher again and got married. She died in 2000 in Jordan.
