= Ani Pachen =

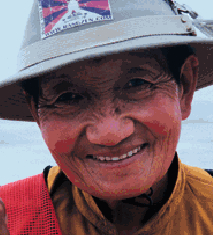
- Ani Pachen
- Born: 1933; Gonjo
- Died: February 2, 2002 (aged 68–69)
- Occupations: Tibetan freedom fighter, activist and nun

Ani Pachen (1933 – February 2, 2002) was a Tibetan freedom fighter and activist.

== Early life ==
Pachen Dolma was born around 1933 in Gonjo, Kham, eastern Tibet. She was the only child of Chieftain elder son Pomda Gonor of the Lemdha clan, of the Phomda Tsang line.

Pachen took refuge in the Dharma when she was 8 years old and was subsequently initiated into the deity practice of Dorje Phurba, a Nyingma tradition.

Pomda Yonten, the younger brother of her father, was survived by an only daughter, Tashi Chodon. Following her departure from Tibet to India, Tashi Chodon married a trader from Gonjo. She subsequently settled in Kalimpong, West Bengal, where she resided until her death in the late 1980s. She is survived by her daughter, who remains the sole surviving direct descendant of this line of the Pondatsang family.

When she was 17, she discovered her father's plans to marry her off and attempted to run away to Gyalsay Rinpoche's monastery at Tromkhog. However, she returned after a few days of traveling with her father's promise to annul the engagement.

The 14th Dalai Lama and the PRC officially signed the Seventeen Point Agreement in 1951. Increasing tensions led her father to train her in the use of firearms and begin organizing militant resistance.

For the next few years, Pachen sat in on her father's administrative meetings with local chieftains. In 1954, Pachen and her mother spent 6 months in Gyalsay Rinpoche's monastery, during which she completed Ngondro, or preliminary religious training. She returned at the request of her father, who wanted to officially teach her the duties involved with being the heir to a chieftain.

== Rebellion ==
By the end of 1956, tens of thousands of armed Khampas had taken to the surrounding hills in armed resistance. When her father died in 1958, she assumed her role as chieftainess of the Lemdha clan. In 1959, she rode at the head of their 600 resistance fighters into the nearby hills. Her clan joined with others from Derge and Lingkha Shipa.

After news of eminent Chinese attack, Pachen returned to Lemdha to warn her family and gather their valuables. Their group grew to thousands as families from the towns of Derge, Lingkha Shipa and Markham fled with the ultimate plan of joining Chushi Gangdruk, the principal resistance group centered in Lhasa at the time. After rejoining the earlier Lemdha resistance fighters, Pachen aided in dividing the refugees into smaller, less visible groups, organized and dispatched defensive patrols, and actively engaged in armed warfare. During this migration, her group was aided by CIA paramilitary support.

Their camp was attacked by overwhelming Chinese forces in the area around the Pelbar village in Tingri County in late 1959, shortly after they heard of Chushi Gangdruk's defeat. Pachen, her mother, aunt, and grandmother took refuge in a nearby forest. They successfully traveled towards India for the next 25 days, until they were captured by Chinese forces along with around 300 other refugees.

== Imprisonment ==
Immediately after being captured, Pachen and her family were held in nearby abandoned houses that served as temporary prisons. Over the course of a week, Pachen was interrogated and beaten. Soon after, many of the women, children and elderly people were released (including her mother, aunt, and grandmother), and Pachen was transferred to a 'collection center' in Lhodzong, where she was held for a month. She reported being the only woman held there.

After that, Pachen was transferred to a monastery in Chamdo that was being used as a Chinese prison. For the next 10 months, she was regularly questioned, until she was transferred to another part of the monastery known as Deyong Nang, where she was further questioned and was forced to wear leg irons for over a year. She was held there from 1961 to 1963.

In 1963, she was moved to Silthog Thang, a prison 'where those...considered guilty of the most serious crimes were sent,' located between the Mekong (known as the Zachu river in Tibet) and Ngomchu river (a tributary of the Mekong). At Silthog Thang, she was sectioned according to gender and level of devotion. She was also held in isolation for 9 months after refusing to denounce her religion and rebuking an officer.

After hearing that her mother was living and working in Kongpo and that a number of prisoners were being sent there, Pachen convinced the prison officers to transfer her as well. She spent a year there and was transferred to Drapchi prison, one of the most notorious Chinese prisons, in 1965. She was held there for 11 years. At Drapchi, she reported that prisoners were forced to wear a Chinese uniform and were forbidden to speak Tibetan, pray, or practice Tibetan customs.

After Mao Zedong's death, Pachen was transferred to the 5th division of Tramo Dzong in Kongpo Nyingtri. She was released in 1981, after being imprisoned for 21 years. She was 48 years old.

== Release ==
After her release from prison in January 1981, Pachen went on a pilgrimage. She visited the monasteries of Sera, Drepung, and Ganden, which had all been destroyed in the Cultural Revolution, during her imprisonment. Over the course of the next year, she visited monasteries in Lhokha, Shedra, Drolma Lhakhang, Dhalakhampo, and stayed for eight months in the Samye monastery. There, she learned the Buddhist practice Chud len, or Essence Extraction, and the Chöd practice, before deciding to return to Lhasa to continue support for the cause of Tibetan independence.

She advertised and participated in three notable demonstrations before fleeing to India; the September 27 and October 1 demonstrations of 1987 and the March 5 demonstration of 1988. In 1989, she discovered that she was to be arrested again and made plans to escape to Nepal over Mount Kailash. After 25 days, she was airlifted to Dharamshala. Her dream to meet the Dalai Lama came true when she was granted a personal audience soon after her arrival. She settled in the Gaden Choeling Nunnery in Dharamsala, India.

== Autobiography ==
Ani Pachen's autobiography, Sorrow Mountain: the Journey of a Tibetan Warrior Nun, was published in 2000, and she toured the United States and Europe. In 2001, she visited the United Kingdom at the invitation of the Tibet Society, and led the annual march through central London to commemorate the Lhasa Uprising.

== Death ==
Ani Pachen died in Dharamsala on February 2, 2002, of heart failure. She died peacefully at the age of 69.

== See also ==
- Political prisoners
