= JS Yamagiri =

Asagiri-class destroyer

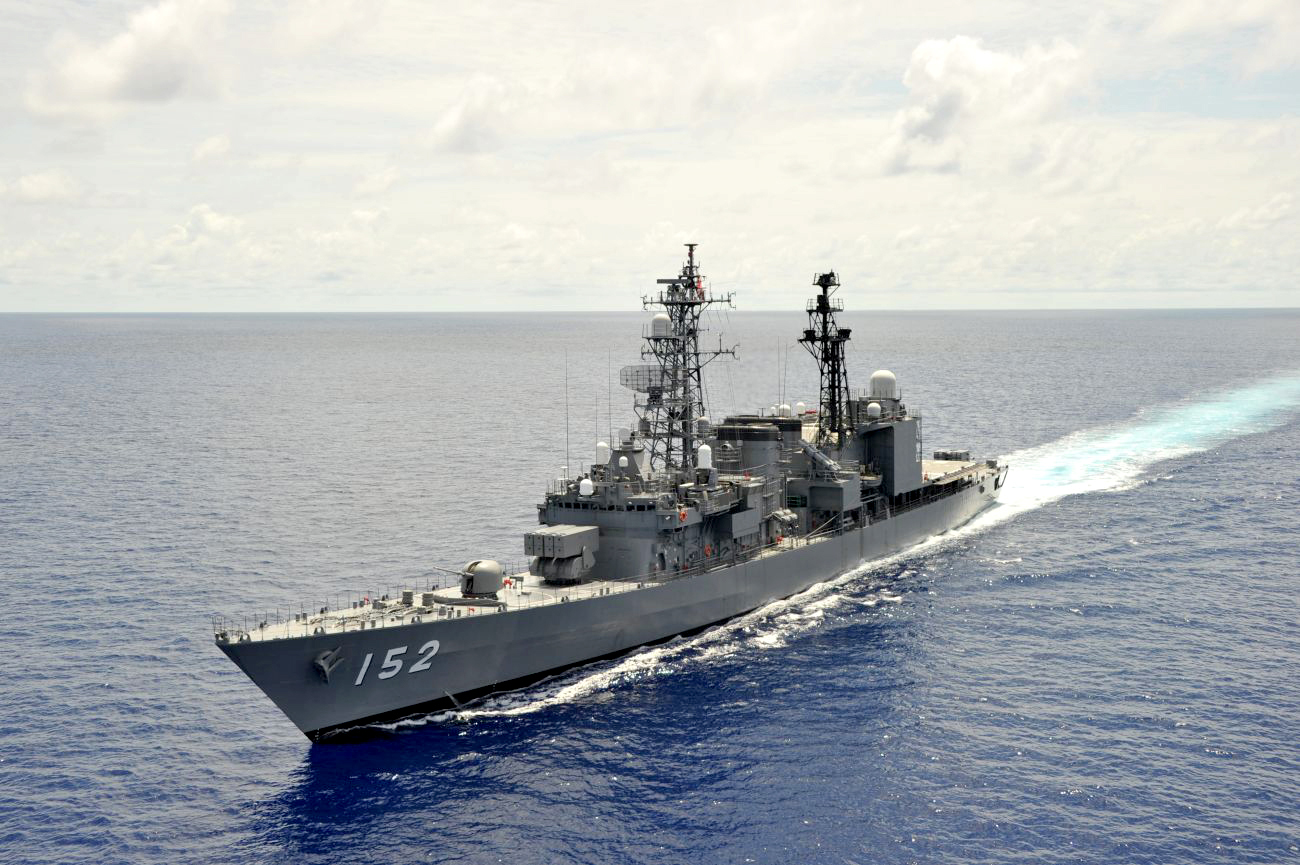
- JS Yamagiri

History

Japan
- Name: Yamagiri; (やまぎり)
- Builder: Mitsui Shipbuilding, Tamano
- Laid down: March 3, 1986
- Launched: October 10, 1987
- Commissioned: January 25, 1989
- Identification: MMSI number: 431999542
- Status: in active service

General characteristics
- Class & type: Asagiri-class destroyer
- Length: 137 m (449 ft 6 in)
- Beam: 14.6 m (47 ft 11 in)
- Draft: 4.5 m (14 ft 9 in)
- Propulsion: 4 gas turbines 54,000 shp (40,000 kW)
- Speed: 30 knots (56 km/h; 35 mph)
- Range: 8,030 nmi (14,870 km; 9,240 mi) at 14 knots (26 km/h; 16 mph)
- Complement: 220
- Sensors & processing systems: OYQ-6/7 CDS (w/ Link-11); OPS-14/24 air search radar; OPS-28 surface search radar; OQS-4A hull sonar; OQR-1 TACTASS
- Electronic warfare & decoys: NOLR-8 intercept; OLT-3 jammer; Mark 36 SRBOC
- Armament: 1 × OTO Melara 76 mm gun; 2 × missile canister up to 8 Harpoon SSM; 2 × 20 mm Phalanx CIWS; 1 × Mk.29 Sea Sparrow SAM octuple launcher; 1 × Mk.16 ASROC anti-submarine rocket octuple launcher; 2 × HOS-302A triple 324 mm (12.8 in) torpedo tubes
- Aircraft carried: 1 SH-60J(K) anti-submarine helicopter

JS Yamagiri (DD-152) is an Asagiri-class destroyer in the Japan Maritime Self-Defense Force (JMSDF).

== History ==
It is the first major combat vessel in the JMSDF to have a female captain. On February 29, 2016 Miho Otani became the first woman to command a destroyer in active duty. She had previously commanded a training destroyer. As of 2016, the vessel had around ten female crew members with designated accommodation and toilets for them. Otani was captain from February 2016 to February 2017.
