= Ryoko Azuma =

Japanese chief

Rear Admiral Ryoko Azuma
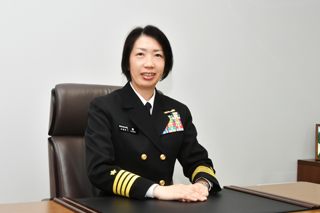
- Ryoko Azuma
- Native name: 東良子
- Born: December 10, 1973
- Allegiance: Japan
- Branch: Japan Maritime Self-Defense Force
- Rank: Rear Admiral
- Commands: 1st Escort Division

Rear Admiral Ryoko Azuma (東 良子 Azuma Ryōko) (born December 10, 1973) is the first woman to become the chief of a warship unit in the Japan Maritime Self-Defense Force. She was also a member of the first female class at the National Defense Academy of Japan.

== Career ==
After graduating from high school, Azuma entered the National Defense Academy of Japan in 1992, where she was one of the first women to enter the academy. In March 1996, she entered the Japan Maritime Self-Defense Force. She became the vice-captain of JDS Kashima, and in March 2013 she became the captain of JS Setoyuki. Alongside Miho Otani, she was the first woman to become the captain of a training ship. In 2014 Azuma became the first female captain to conduct a deep sea navigation training. On January 1, 2015, she was official promoted to the rank of rear admiral. On March 23, 2016, she transferred to the Maritime Staff Office.

On March 6, 2018, she became the commander of Escort Flotilla 1, and was the first woman to command a warship squadron for the Japanese Maritime Self-Defense Force. The squadron is made up of four warships and the helicopter carrier JS Izumo. On August 5, 2018, she took command of a mission to deal with the pirates in the Gulf of Aden in Somalia.

== See also ==
- Misa Matsushima – First woman in the Japanese Self-Defense Force to become a fighter pilot
