= Miho Otani =

Japanese Maritime Self-Defense Force officer

Captain Miho Otani
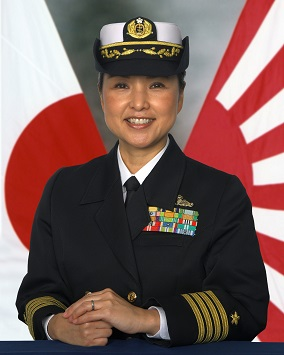
- Native name: 大谷 三穂
- Born: May 28, 1971 (age 55)
- Allegiance: Japan
- Branch: Japan Maritime Self-Defense Force
- Rank: Captain
- Commands: JS Yamagiri, JS Myōkō

Captain Miho Otani (大谷 三穂) (born May 28, 1971) is an officer in the Japanese Maritime Self-Defense Force. She was the first woman to become the captain of a naval training vessel and a destroyer. Otani was also a member of the first female class to enter the National Defense Academy of Japan.

== Career ==
Otani initially planned to study at Ryukoku University. When she was in her second year of high school she saw news about the Gulf War and decided to apply to the National Defense Academy of Japan instead. Though her family did not approve, she entered the Academy in April 1992 as a member of the first female class. At first she wanted to be a pilot, but she ended up being assigned to the Maritime Self-Defense Force, where she worked on the training ship JDS Natsugumo.

The ban on women serving in destroyers had been lifted in 2008, and so in 2011 she became the vice captain of JS Asagiri. In March 2013, Otani became the captain of the training ship Shimayuki. Alongside Ryoko Azuma, she was the first woman to become the captain of a training ship. In February 2016, Otani took command of JS Yamagiri, making her the first woman in the Japanese Maritime Self-Defense Force to command a destroyer. On July 1, 2017, she was promoted to captain. On December 2, 2019, She took command of JS Myōkō making her the first woman to command a JMSDF Aegis destroyer.

== See also ==
- Misa Matsushima – First woman in the Japanese Self-Defense Force to become a fighter pilot
