= Shaliza Dhami =

Indian air force officer

Group Captain Shaliza Dhami
- Born: c. 1982; Ludhiana, Punjab, India
- Spouse: Vineet Joshi
- Military career
- Allegiance: India
- Branch: Indian Air Force
- Service years: 2003–present
- Rank: Group Captain
- Service number: 27773

Group Captain Shaliza Dhami (born c. 1982) is a senior officer in the Indian Air Force (IAF). She is the first woman officer in the IAF to become a Flight Commander and the first to command a front-line combat unit in the IAF.

== Career ==
Born in Ludhiana, Punjab. Dhami holds a Bachelor of Technology degree in Electronics and Communication. Her first solo flight was in 2003 in a HAL HPT-32 Deepak. She was commissioned as a flying officer in the Air Force on 20 December 2003 on a short-service commission, and was promoted to flight lieutenant on 20 December 2005 and to squadron leader on 20 December 2009.

Promoted to wing commander on 20 December 2016, Dhami became a Flight Commander in August 2019, the first woman officer in India to do so. She is a flight commander of a Chetak helicopter unit at Hindan Air Force Station. She also became the first woman flying instructor of the IAF for Chetak and Cheetah helicopters; this made her the first woman flying instructor in the IAF.

On 18 December 2018, Dhami became the first woman officer in the Indian Air Force to be granted a permanent commission. She was selected for promotion to group captain, effective from 28 December 2021 (seniority from 28 September 2021), thus becoming the first female officer in the Indian Armed Forces to attain a selection-grade rank in a combat arm. In March 2023, she became the first woman selected to command a front-line IAF combat unit.

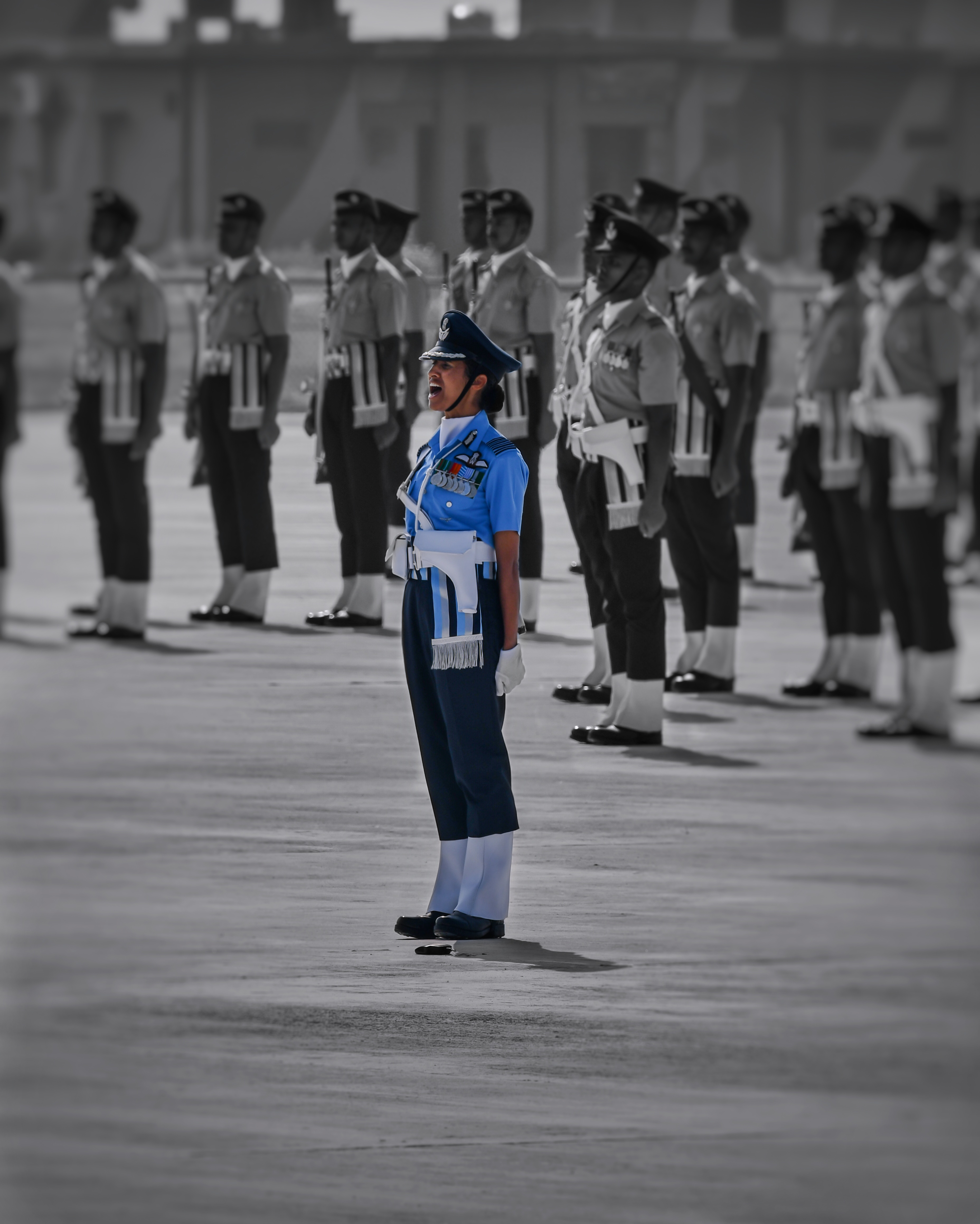
Gp Capt Shailza Dhami, commanding the 91st IAF Day parade

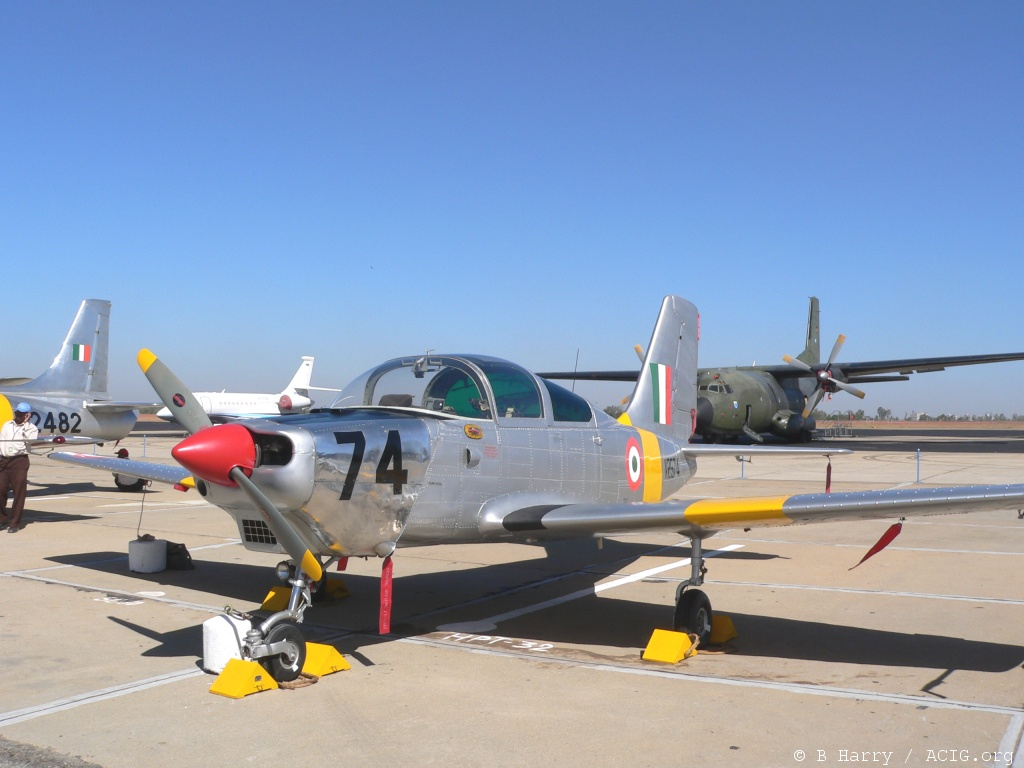
Dhami's first solo flight was in a HAL Deepak

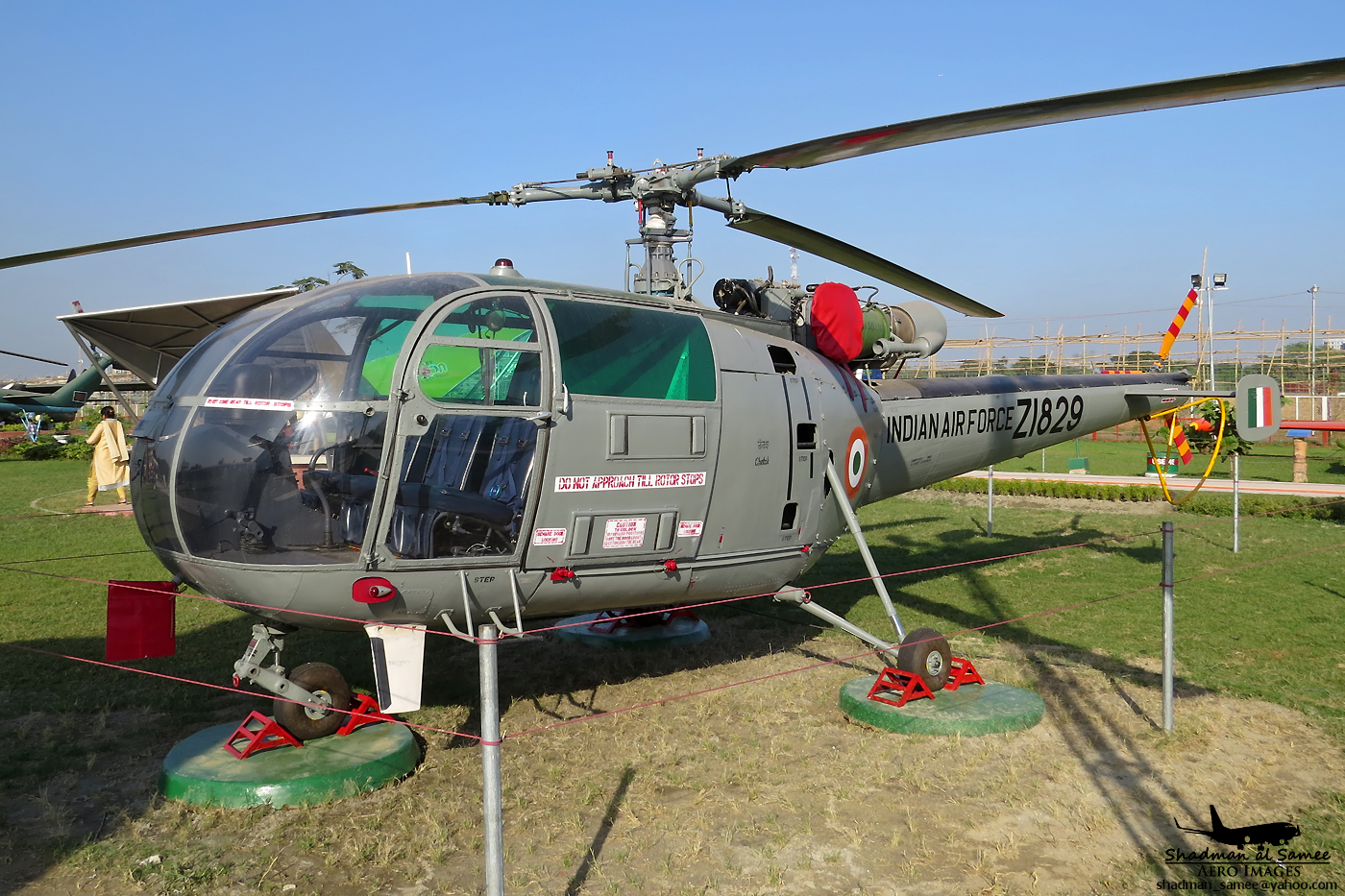
She is the first woman flying instructor for HAL Chetak

== See also ==
- Squadron Leader Minty Agarwal
