= Minty Agarwal =

Indian air force officer

Squadron Leader Minty Aggarwal YSM
- Military career
- Allegiance: India
- Branch: Indian Air Force
- Service years: 2011–present
- Rank: Squadron Leader
- Service number: 31874
- Conflicts: 2019 India–Pakistan border skirmishes
- Awards: YSM

Squadron Leader Minty Aggarwal YSM is an IAF fighter controller.

== Career ==
Aggarwal was commissioned in the logistics branch of the IAF as a flying officer on 18 June 2011, holding a short-service commission. She was promoted to flight lieutenant on 18 June 2013 and to squadron leader on 18 June 2017.

She served as the fighter controller for the MiG-21 that was shot down during the 2019 India–Pakistan border skirmishes. In August 2019, she was awarded the Yudh Seva Medal (YSM) by President Ram Nath Kovind, becoming the first woman to receive it.

== See also ==
- Wing Commander Shaliza Dhami
- 2019 Balakot airstrike
