= Fatumah Ahmed =

Commander of Kenyan Air Force

Fatuma Gaiti Ahmed
- Military career
- Allegiance: Kenya
- Branch: Kenya Air Force
- Service years: 1985—present
- Rank: Major general

Fatuma Gaiti Ahmed is a major general and commander of the Kenya Air Force. She was originally a member of the women-only Kenyan Women Service Corps, transferring to the air force when the unit was absorbed into the three armed services in 1999. Ahmed has a degree from the Institute of Diplomacy and International Studies and has served mainly in human resources roles. She was Kenya's first female brigadier.

== Career ==
Fatuma Gaiti Ahmed born in 1965 joined the Kenyan Army "by accident". Upon completing secondary school in 1983 she had to return to her home town in order to claim an identification card. The military happened to be carrying out a recruitment campaign at a stadium near to the offices of the ID services and she made enquiries about joining. She entered the Kenya Military Academy as an officer cadet in 1984 and upon graduating was commissioned a second lieutenant in the Kenyan Women Service Corps. From 1985 she served alongside the Kenyan Air Force, mainly in human resources.

Ahmed has a degree from the National Defence College and the Institute of Diplomacy and International Studies and a diploma in management from Strathmore University. She transferred to the Kenyan Air Force when the Women Service Corps was dissolved in 1999 and its personnel integrated into the remaining Kenyan armed forces. This also removed the limitation for members of the Women Service Corps on not marrying or getting pregnant; Ahmed went on to have three children. She served as deputy commander of a battalion and later as head of personnel at the Kenyan Air Force headquarters. Ahmed was promoted to the rank of brigadier on 10 August 2015 and was also appointed managing director of the Defense Forces Medical Insurance Scheme. She was the first female brigadier in Kenya.

Ahmed was promoted to major general in 2018, making her Kenya's first female major general. Later, in 2024, she became the first female commander of Kenya's air force, which also made her the first woman to lead one of Kenya's military services.
