= Misa Matsushima =

Japanese fighter pilot

- 松島美紗
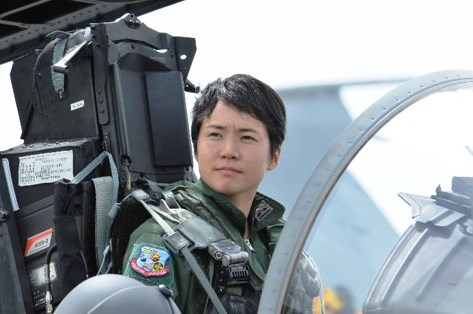
- Matsushima seated in the cockpit of an F-15 in August 2018
- Born: 1991 or 1992 (age 34–35)
- Military career
- Branch: Japan Air Self-Defense Force
- Rank: Major
- Unit: 5th Air Wing

First Lieutenant Misa Matsushima (松島美紗, Matsushima Misa) (born 1991 or 1992) is a Japanese fighter pilot who became the first female fighter pilot in Japanese history.

Matsushima graduated from the Japan National Defense Academy in March 2014 and obtained her pilot's license in October 2016. She initially trained to be a transport and rescue pilot, but started training to be a fighter pilot after the Ministry of Defense opened the fighter pilot specialization to female candidates in 2015. Matsushima received her fighter certification on August 23, 2018, and was assigned to 305th Tactical Fighter Squadron of the Japan Air Self-Defense Force's 5th Air Wing, headquartered at Nyutabaru Air Base, where she flies the Mitsubishi F-15J.

In October 2023, she and her husband, First Lieutenant Yoko Ito, passed the Command and Staff Office (CS) Course exam, and it was decided that the couple would both enter the Air Self-Defense Force Officer College in April 2024.

Although Japan has had female military aviators since Kazue Kashiji in 1997, Matsushima is the first to pilot a fighter type aircraft. She was inspired to become a fighter pilot after watching the 1986 film Top Gun as a child.
